= Song of the Blind Arab =

Song
- Released: 1950s
- Length: 4:17
- Songwriter: Huseyn Javid
- Composer: Fikret Amirov

"Song of the Blind Arab" (Azerbaijani: Kor ərəbin mahnısı) is a song written by the Azerbaijani composer Fikret Amirov for the staging of the "Sheikh Sanan" play by Huseyn Javid. It is noted that the song is a typical example of a ballad song.

== History of the song ==
The play Sheikh-Sanan by H. Javid is based on the well-known in Azerbaijan Arab legend. Fikret Amirov began writing the music for a dramatic performance in the 50s. This was Amirovs first appeal to the Arab theme. Almost all the music for the play Amirov created on the basis of Azerbaijani material and only in two or three cases he drew it on authentic Arabic melodies, reworking them enough. This is how the “Song of the Blind Arab”, popular outside the play, appeared.

In 1961, on the Azerbaijan Televisions studio, there was shot a video clip for the "Song of the Blind" by the stage-director Rauf Kazimovsky. The song in the video was performed by Mamedali Aliyev. The clip itself was filmed in Icheri Sheher. The song was also performed by the Peoples Artist of the USSR Rashid Behbudov. The Peoples Artist of Azerbaijan Malekkhanym Eyyubova shot a video clip for the song.

In 2007, the rapper Nado and Javid Huseyn combined Amirovs music with rap and presented this song in this genre. The song was arranged by Azad Veliyev.

In 2012, at a solemn event dedicated to the 130th anniversary of Huseyn Javid, the song was performed by the Peoples Artist of Azerbaijan Alim Gasimov.

== Text ==
Azerbaijani	English translation
Nə eşq olaydı, nə aşiq, Nə nazlı afət olaydı, Nə xəlq olaydı, nə xaliq, Nə əşki-həsrət olaydı. Nə dərd olaydı, nə dərman, Nə sur olaydı, nə matəm, Nə aşiyaneyi-vüslət, Nə bari-firqət olaydı. Könüldə nuri-məhəbbət, Gözümdə pərdeyi-zülmət… Nə nur olaydı, nə zülmət, Nə böylə xilqət olaydı. Nədir bu xilqəti-bimərhəmət, bu pərdəli hikmət? Bu zülmə qarşı nolur bir də bir ədalət olaydı. Tükəndi taqətü-səbrim, ədalət! Ah, ədalət! Nə öncə öylə səadət, Nə böylə zillət olaydı.	There would be no love, there would be no lovers There would be no capricious beloved There would be no created, there would be no creator, There would be no sorrowful tears. There would be no ailment, there would be no medicine, There would be no wedding, There would be no mourning. There would be no nests of lovers There would be no fruit of separation. The ray of love is in my soul The curtain of darkness is in my eyes. There would be no light and darkness There would be no such creations. What are these cruel creations, philosophies are unclear, There would also be justice against this suffering. There is no more patience, justice though, justice! There would be no that old happiness Not this present oppression.

== See also ==
- Ayrılıq
- No moles left in Irevan
- Şuşanın dağları başı dumanlı
