= Riad Mammadov =

Russian pianist

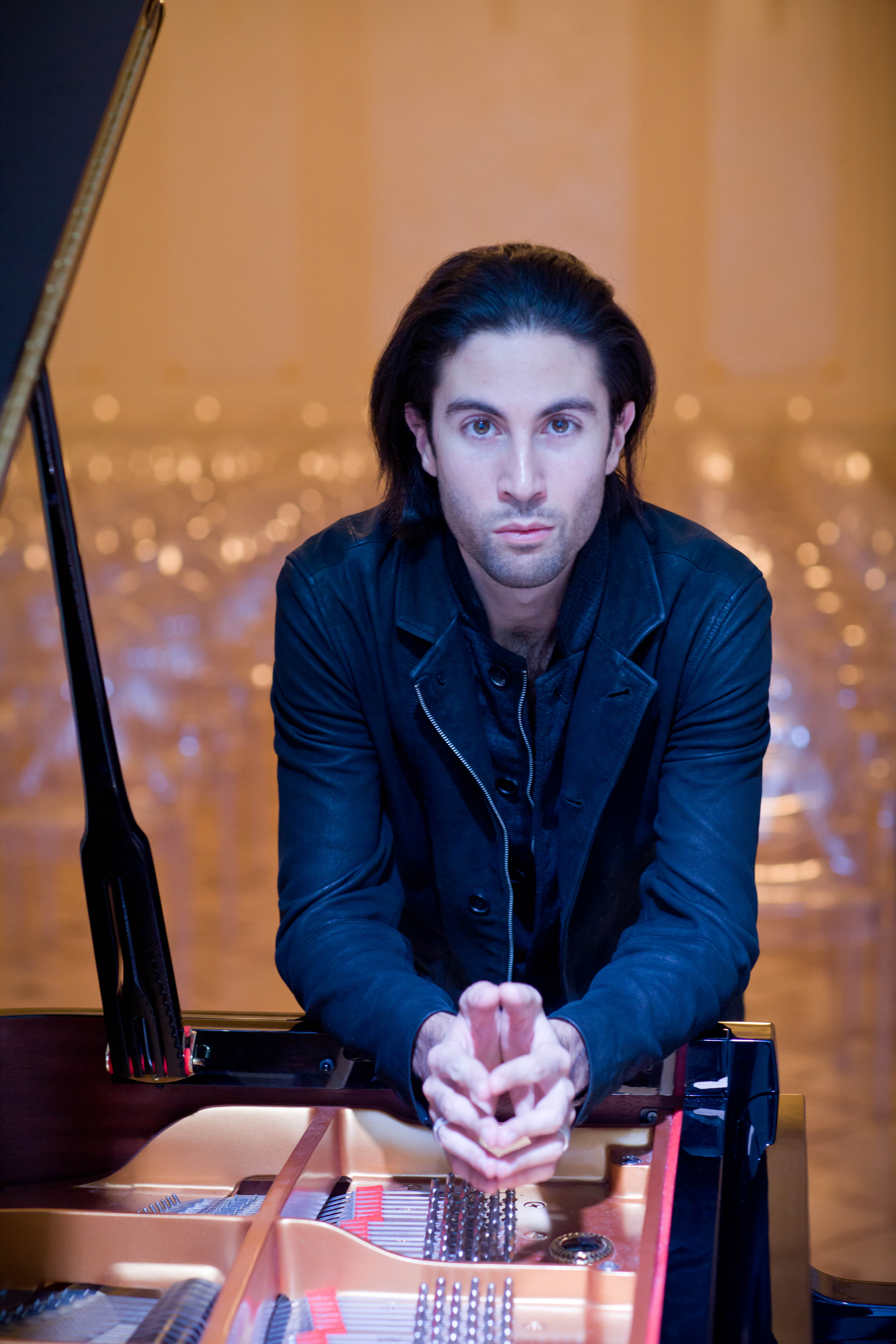

Background information
- Born: 11 January 1989 (age 36)
- Origin: Baku, Soviet Union
- Genres: Classical music, jazz, mugam
- Instrument: Piano
- Years active: since 1996
- Website: http://riadmammadov.com

Riad Mammadov (real name Riad Mamedov, Russian: Риад Тахир оглы Мамедов, Azerbaijani: Riad Tahir oğlu Məmmədov; born 11 January 1989 in Baku) - pianist, musicologist, performer of jazz and classical music. At the invitation of Theodor Currentzis, he was appointed special musical adviser to the opening ceremony of the First European Games of 2015 in Baku. He is a member of music festivals in Russia, Azerbaijan, Canada. Riad Mammadov is one of several professional musicians in the world who work in the jazz-mugam genre.

== Biography ==
Riad Mammadov was born in the family of artists. He graduated from the Moscow Conservatory and postgraduate programme with the degree in “piano” under supervision of Professor K. Knorre, an Honoured Artist of Russia. He also graduated from academic postgraduate programme as a music expert directed by Professor V. Kholopova. He was a student of such prominent music teachers as V. Merjanov, O. Bonduryanskiy, M. Lidskiy, E. Nazirova, S. Beybutova and others. While studying Riad Mammadov became a scholarship holder of Azerbaijan Prezindetial Fund named after H. Aliyev. Upon graduating he was invited as guest artist to the Tchaikovski Opera and Ballet Theatre. Artistic director T. Currentzis.

Riad Mammadov performed with Azerbaijan State Symphony Orchestra, State Chamber Orchestra named after G. Garayev, and also with MusicAeterna orchestra, Veritas, Moscow Youth chamber orchestra, Niagara Silkway, Canadian chamber orchestra, New Munich orchestra, State Academic Chamber orchestra of Novosibirsk Philharmonia headed by the famous conductors, such as T. Currentzis, F. Chizhevsky, M. Emelyanychev, F. Ibrahimov, A. Skoryer, T. Geokchayev, E. Quliyev and others. He also played with Belgian, US and Hungarian jazz “Big Bands”.

One can name more than 15 countries where Riad Mammadov has already performed, among which one can mention the Grand Hall of the Moscow State Conservatory, the Alexandrinsky Theatre, the Azerbaijan State Philharmonia named after M.Magomayev, Grand stage of the Theatre of Opera and Ballet named after P.I.Tchaikovsky, Sante-Chantier Castle, the Concert Hall of Pushkin State Museum of Fine Arts, Théâtre de l'Athénée etc. The pianist was also a participant of such music festivals as Niagara Music (Canada), Diaghilev festival (Russia), Primavera Classica (Russia), Music ark project by Vladimir Martynov (Russia), Summer jazz festival in the Grand Hall of the Moscow Conservatory, Uzeyir Hajibeyov International Music Festival (Azerbaijan), Caspian Jazz and Blues Festival, International Baku Jazz Festival (Azerbaijan), International music festival in Gabala (Azerbaijan), Electro Jazz Festival in Electrotheatre Stanislavsky and others. His performances were broadcast on TV and radio in Russia, Azerbaijan, Canada, Belgium and the USA.

Riad Mammadov is an author of a number of scientific articles on classification of genres in Azerbaijan modern music. In addition Riad Mammadov has teaching experience.

In April 2020, two music releases by Riad Mammadov appeared at once. The debut single in the genre of jazz-mugham with the composition "Waiting for Aziza" and the debut mini-album of classical music Surrogate Dreams II, which features pianos by Chopin, Tchaikovsky and Debussy.

During self-isolation in the spring-summer of 2020, he wrote and recorded a vinyl record You are an Island with two piano pieces on one side and one ambient composition on the other.

== Discography ==
- 2020 — Surrogate Dreams II
- 2020 — Waiting for Aziza
