= Fidan Haciyeva =

Azerbaijani opera singer (born 1976)

Fidan Hajiyeva
- Birth name: Fidan Haji Agha qizi Hajiyeva
- Born: September 7, 1976 (age 48); Baku, Azerbaijan SSR, Soviet Union
- Genres: Opera, classical music
- Occupation(s): Singer, actress
- Years active: 1995–present
- Website: fidanhaciyeva.com

Fidan Hajiaga qizi Hajiyeva-Naylor (born September 7, 1976) is an Azerbaijani opera singer – mezzo-soprano. She was awarded People's Artist of the Republic of Azerbaijan. She is soloist of the Azerbaijan State Academic Opera and Ballet Theater.

== Life ==
Fidan Haji Agha qizi Hajiyeva was born in Baku, Baku, Azerbaijan SSR, Soviet Union on September 7, 1976. In 1984 she entered the fortepiano class of the Bulbul Secondary Music School. She was a student of Professor Huseyn Aliyev. Since 1996, she has been a soloist in the Azerbaijan State Academic Opera and Ballet Theater. In 2000, she performed in front of thousands of spectators on the stage of "Aspendos", an ancient theater in Turkey. In 2002, she won an international competition held at the Kidjiano Academy in Italy. In 2006, she was awarded the title of "Honored Artist of the Republic of Azerbaijan" and in 2006, 2007, and 2008 she was awarded the Honorary Award of the President of the Republic of Azerbaijan. In 2010, she won the "Competition of Professional Vocalists" of the Rome Academy of Music in Italy. In 2012, at the "Gran Gala" concert organized at the Donisetti Theater in Bergamo, Italy, she was awarded the Ambassador of Peace diploma for her service in the promotion of classical Italian music. In 2015, she was awarded the title of "People's Artist" on the occasion of March 8 International Women's Day for her effective activities in the field of culture in the Republic of Azerbaijan. In 2016, she founded a Music Center bearing her name. After Fatma Mukhtarova, the first "Carmen" performer who sang classical world operas on our national stage, Hajiyeva became known as the second Carmen of the Azerbaijani opera scene.

Fidan Hajiyeva married Philip Naylor from England in 2003; they have one daughter and two sons.

== Career ==
In 1984, Fidan Hajiyeva was admitted to the fortepiano class of secondary music school named after Bulbul. After graduating in 1994, she entered the vocal faculty of the Baku Music Academy named after Uzeyir Hajibeyli. She received professional training from Professor Hüseyin Aliyev, and in 1998, took master classes in vocal art from the world-famous People's Artist of the Russian Federation, Irina Arkhipova.

Her first appearance on the professional opera stage was in 1996, at the age of 19, with the role of "Singer Girl" in Koroglu. Since then, she has been a leading vocalist at the Azerbaijan State Opera and Ballet Theatre. Opera singer performs national and classic leading opera performance parts.

In 2000, she participated in the opera days organized by "TURKSOY" in Turkey and represented the Republic of Azerbaijan. In the same year, the opera singer signed a contract with Mersin State Opera and Ballet Theater of the Republic of Turkey. She performed "Carmen" many times on the stages of Mersin, Istanbul, İzmir, and Ankara theaters. The most memorable performance took place on the stage of the ancient theater "Aspendos" in Turkey in front of 12,000 spectators.

Captivated by Fidan Hajiyeva's voice, she was invited by the Kidjiano Academy in Italy to participate in an international competition in 2002, where she secured first place. During her time in Italy, the birthplace of opera, she took part in master classes hosted by mezzo-soprano Bernadetta Manca di Nissa. Later, Fidan Hajiyeva returned to her homeland and obtained a postgraduate degree in the class of Professor Huseyn Aliyev.

The first album of the artist called "Jealousy and love" was released in 2003.

In 2004, she became the main soloist of the Song and Dance Ensemble named after Hazi Aslanov of the Ministry of Defense of the Republic of Azerbaijan.

In 2005, she participated in the EXPO-2005 international exhibition held in Nagoya, Japan as a member of the Azerbaijani delegation, presented Azerbaijani music and performed songs in Japanese, which captivated her Japanese audience.

In 2006, the opera singer was awarded the title of "Honored Artist of the Republic of Azerbaijan" and was awarded the Honorary Award of the President of the Republic of Azerbaijan.

October 2006, she gave a series of concerts at the Berlin Philharmonic, Stuttgart, and Mainz theaters. She was accompanied by the Azerbaijan State Chamber Orchestra conducted by Teymur Goychayev in the art days of Azerbaijan in Germany.

May 11, 2007, she was bestowed with the award of the President of the Republic of Azerbaijan.

May 7, 2008, she received her second award of the President of the Republic of Azerbaijan for her performance.

October, 2008, a joint concert was held in Kyiv with the People's Artist of Ukraine, Alexander Buretz. This event was collaboratively organized by the Ministries of Culture of Azerbaijan and Ukraine.

December 25, 2008, at a concert dedicated to the Day of Solidarity of World Azerbaijanis, organized by the Embassy of Azerbaijan in Ukraine, Kyiv City State Administration, Kyiv City Organization of the Congress of Ukrainian Azerbaijanis and "Ukraine-Azerbaijan" International Charity Fund, in the hall of the P.I. Tchaikovsky Opera Studio of the National Music Academy of Ukraine, Fidan Haciyeva performed.

In 2009, she represented Azerbaijan at the opening of the 12th TURKSOY Opera Days in Turkey's Mersin Opera and Ballet Theater, where 18 opera singers from Turkic-speaking countries participated.

In 2010, she took first place in the competition of professional vocal performers organized by the Rome Academy of Music in Italy. Later, she continued her vocal studies with the world-famous mezzo-soprano Bruna Buglioni.

In 2011, she played the role of "Carmen" in the Samsun State Opera Theater of Turkey.

May 9, 2011, she performed a solo in the "Auditorium Parco della Musica" complex of the Santa Cecilia National Academy of Music, the largest concert hall in Rome, Italy. She performed samples of Azerbaijani and Italian opera.

May 25, 2011, Giuseppe Verdi's opera "Aida" was performed at the Academic Opera and Ballet Theater. Famous Italian conductor Gianluca Marciano conducted this performance. The "Amneris" part was performed by Fidan Hajiyeva.

June, 2011, Fidan Hajiyeva organized a joint concert program with French tenor Jean-Francis Monvoisin in Baku.

June 25, 2011, Giacomo Puccini's opera "Suor Angelica" with Fidan Hajiyeva's participation was staged within the summer festival held in the Montefiore Conca city of Italy.

September 18, 2011, she performed in Frascati, Italy. Fidan Hajiyeva also performed a duet from the second act of the opera "Aida" together with Italian singer Anna Consolara at the concert. The star of the Azerbaijani opera scene also presented Leonora's aria from Gaetano Donizetti's opera "Favoritka" to the audience. In the end, connoisseurs of classical opera appreciated Fidan Hajiyeva's art as "Strong and beautiful voice".???

In 2012, she acted in Italy: Turin, Milan, Venice in Giuseppe Verdi's Conservatory for the first time within days of the Azerbaijani culture.

In 2012, the famous Italian conductor and pianist Stefano Miceli specially our compatriot to the "Gran Gala" concert organized at the Donisetti Theater in Bergamo, Italy. The organizers of the festival awarded Fidan Hajiyeva with the Peacemaking Ambassador diploma for her service. With this, the artist signed her greatest success, which brought honor to Azerbaijan.

September 18, 2013, on the opening ceremony of the 5th Uzeyir Hajibeyli International Music Festival organized by the Heydar Aliyev Foundation and the Ministry of Culture and Tourism, she appeared in the opera Arshin Mal Alan at the Azerbaijan State Academic Opera and Ballet Theater.

January 30, 2014, Fidan Hajiyeva performed as a soloist at the concert of the State Piano Trio at the Chamber and Organ Music Hall of the Azerbaijan State Philharmonic.

March 3, 2014, Fidan Hajiyeva's solo concert was held at King's Place art and culinary center in London

April 19, 2014, a solo concert program was organized, during which she performed "Sevgili Janan" for the first time at the Heydar Aliyev Palace.

In 2015, according to the order of the president Ilham Aliyev, for productive activity in the field of culture of the Republic of Azerbaijan, on the occasion of the International Women's Day - on March 8 was awarded the title of "People's Artist".

April 19, 2015, she performed her second solo concert called "One spring evening" in the Heydar Aliyev Palace.

In 2015 Fidan Hajiyeva was given the rank of the lieutenant of Head Department of Internal Troops of the Ministry of Internal Affairs of the Republic of Azerbaijan.

November 28, 2015, the operetta "Arshin Mal Alan" was staged at the State Academic Opera and Ballet Theater, with Fidan Hajiyeva portraying the role of Gulchohra for the first time.

February 14, 2016, Fidan Hajiyeva held her solo concert "Two Lives, One Heart" at the Azerbaijan State Academic Opera and Ballet Theater.

May 11-15, 2016, in honor of the 90th anniversary of the British Queen Elizabeth II, the Azerbaijani delegation participated in the events organized in London under the joint organization of the Ministry of Culture and Tourism, the European Azerbaijan Society (TEAS) and the Equestrian Federation of the Republic of Azerbaijan (ARAF). The presentation of Azerbaijani culture was accompanied by the performance of Tar performer Rafig Rustamov and People's Artist Fidan Hajiyeva.

December 20, 2016, she participated in the 7th international world forum in Minsk at the invitation of the National Academic Grand Opera and Ballet Theater of Belarus. At the gala concert organized within the framework of the forum, famous vocalists from several countries were invited. Azerbaijan was represented by Fidan Hajiyeva.

April 20, 2017, within the concluded agreement on cultural cooperation with the National Academic Bolshoi Theatre of the Opera and the Ballet of Belarus, Fidan Hajiyeva played the main part - a role of Carmen in a performance of the opera "Carmen" by Georges Bizet in Minsk.

July 14, 2017, on the occasion of the National Day of the French Republic, the Association of Friends of Azerbaijan (ADA) in Paris organized a classical music night at the Azerbaijan Culture Center in Paris for Fidan Hajiyeva, Azerbaijanis living in Paris and the people of France, which included selected examples of classical music by famous Azerbaijani and European composers.

May 6, 2018, People's Artist Fidan Hajiyeva performed at the Azerbaijan State Academic Philharmonic named after Muslim Magomayev. She presented a concert program titled "Feelings" featuring romances composed by Honored Art Worker Adila Huseynzade. During the concert, Fidan Hajiyeva sang various romances composed by Adila Huseynzade over the years. This concert marked her first performance under the title "Azerbaijan People's Republic-100."

May 11, 2018, Fidan Hajiyeva performed a concert program dedicated to the 95th anniversary of the birth of Heydar Aliyev at the Shota Rustaveli State Drama Theater in Tbilisi. In this concert, the People's Artist performed the works of our outstanding composers - Uzeyir Hajibeyli, Adila Huseynzada, Muslim Magomayev, Gara Garayev, Tofig Guliyev and world composers.

May 16, 2018, Fidan Hajiyeva performed a concert program in London on the occasion of the 100th anniversary of the Azerbaijan People's Republic. At the concert, she sang the romances of Adila Huseynzada.

May 23, 2018, Fidan Hajiyeva performed another concert program on the occasion of the 100th anniversary of the Azerbaijan Democratic Republic at the Bellevue Palace in Bern, Switzerland.

She was awarded the Presidential Award on May 9, 2018, May 10, 2019, May 7, 2020 and May 7, 2021.

On October 26, 2018, People's Artist Fidan Hajiyeva participated in a grand event organized in Istanbul to commemorate the 95th anniversary of the Republic of Turkey and the 100th anniversary of the Azerbaijan Democratic Republic. Sharing her thoughts about the event, People's Artist Fidan Hajiyeva expressed her happiness in being part of a night dedicated to the brotherhood of Azerbaijan and Turkey. Fidan Hajiyeva was honored with a diploma at this event and expressed her gratitude to the organizers.

June 4, 2019, People's Artist Fidan Hajiyeva became the first Azerbaijani woman to graduate in composition from the Conservatory, with the support of the Association of Friends of Azerbaijan, the Embassy of Azerbaijan in France, and Paris' "House of Azerbaijan". She presented a grand concert program featuring works by Khadimi Adila Huseynzada in Paris, marking the centenary of granting voting rights to women in Azerbaijan.

November 4, 2019, an event and concert program took place in Bern, Switzerland, to celebrate the 100th anniversary of Azerbaijan's diplomatic service. People's Artist Fidan presented a solo concert featuring timeless works by foreign and Azerbaijani composers, including a segment from Uzeyir Hajibeyli's operetta "Arshin Mal Alan," the novel "Sevgili Janan," compositions by Gara Garayev, and Muslim Magomayev's song "Azerbaijan," among others.

November 23-25, 2019, the "XIV Delphi Games" brought together youth from CIS member states in the Moscow region of the Russian Federation. People's Artist Fidan Hajiyeva, representing the Republic of Azerbaijan, served as a member of the international jury in the "academic vocal" category.

May 21, 2020, Fidan Hajiyeva was appointed as the deputy head of the Exemplary Military Band of the Internal Troops and as the head of the song ensemble.

November 5, 2021, she performed at the "Voices of Peace" gala concert held in London to mark the first anniversary of the Victory in the Patriotic War.

November 21, 2021, she established a unique Chamber Orchestra composed entirely of women for the first time in Azerbaijan. Fidan Hajiyeva participated in a concert program on May 24, 2022, in Paris, France, marking the 104th anniversary of the establishment of the Azerbaijan Democratic Republic (ADR). The program included "My Shusha," composed by Konul Huseynova with lyrics by Vahid Aziz, Uzeyir Hajibayli's "Arshin Mal Alan," "Sevgili Janan," and "Azerbaijan" by Muslim Magomayev, among other songs.

Since 2022, she has been working as a "vocal teacher" at the Azerbaijan National Conservatory. October 24, 2023, she took the role of "Countess" in the opera "Queen of Spades" by Pyotr I. Tchaikovsky. November 8, 2023, she had a solo concert in Barcelona, Spain. On April 27-May 3, 2024, the International Opera Festival was held in Azerbaijan for the first time with the support of the Vocal Music School of People's Artist Fidan Hajiyeva. Thanks to the hard work of People's Artist Fidan Hajiyeva, the festival lasted 7 days. During the festival days, various concerts were organized in the famous concert halls of our country. The festival has become a music holiday in our country. Young vocalists of our stage were given a place at these concerts, opera stars of our country performed. Also, opera singers from Turkey, Italy, Georgia, Germany and Russia gave the audience a special musical evening. The famous opera "Carmen" was presented in a new style within the framework of the festival. This was met with special applause by the audience. https://www.azernews.az/culture/225604.html

May 9, 2025, People's Artist Fidan Hajiyeva was awarded the 1st degree medal "For Impeccable Service" on the occasion of the 20th anniversary of her service in the Internal Troops. Since May 21, 2020, Fidan Hajiyeva has been the deputy chief of the Exemplary Demonstration Military Orchestra of the Internal Troops - the head of the song ensemble.

April 23-29, 2025, the II International Opera Festival of Fidan Hajiyeva was held in Baku. The seven-day festival organized concerts in various venues of the city with the participation of both well-known performers and young opera singers, as well as young talents aged 6-16. At the opening of the festival, the legendary operetta "Arshin mal alan" by the genius Uzeyir Hajibeyli was presented to the audience. The famous German conductor Boian Wiedenoff also participated in the closing concert of my festival. At that concert, the performance of the symphony orchestra of the Opera and Ballet Theater and famous soloists added a special color to the closing concert

=== Carmen ===
Fidan Hajiyeva's association with the 4-act tragedy opera "Carmen," composed by the renowned French composer Georges Bizet with a libretto by Ludovik Halevi and Henri Meliak, holds a special place in her career. Her journey with "Carmen" began with her rendition of the aria of "Carmen's" friend "Mercedes" at the age of 19. Two years later, she undertook the challenging role of "Carmen."

According to Fidan, performing in "Carmen" required extensive effort, including learning flamenco dance and continuous practice. She even travelled to Andalusia, the birthplace of "Carmen," saying that "the main thing is to completely adapt to the character of one's hero".

Fidan attributes much of her success to her performances in "Carmen." She mentioned that the aria "Habanera" from "Carmen" is always close to her heart and that this opera is a family tradition. Even in her introduction to her husband, "Carmen" played a significant role. Renowned "Carmen" performer Tamara Sinyavskaya wished Fidan Hajiyeva success in her portrayal of "Carmen."

== Performed operas ==
- Singer girl, Koroghlu (Uzeyir Hajibeyov)
- Smile, Sevil (Fikrat Amirov)
- Asya, Arshin Mal Alan (Uzeyir Hajibeyov)
- Gulchohra, Arshin Mal Alan (Uzeyir Hajibeyov)
- Karmen, Carmen (Georges Bizet)
- Rozina, The Barber of Seville (Gioachino Rossini)
- Amneris, Aida (Giuseppe Verdi)
- Azuchena, Il trovatore (Giuseppe Verdi)
- Maddalena, Rigoletto (Giuseppe Verdi)
- La Princhipessa, Suor Angelica (Giacomo Puccini)
- Santuzza, Cavalleria rusticana (Pietro Mascagni)
- The Old Countess, The Queen of Spades (Pyotr Ilyich Tchaikovsky)

== Albums ==
- “Jealousy and Love” (2003)
- “Beloved” (2014)

== Concerts and Solo concerts ==
Date	Country, City	Venue	Concert name	Conducting	Accompaniment
2008.10.--	Ukraine, Kyiv	-	With "Aleksandr Burets"	-	-
2011.05.09	Italy, Rome	Auditorium Parco della Musica	"Heydər Əliyev`s 88th"	-	Zulfiya Sadigova və Paolo Sarachino
2011.06.--	Azerbaijan, Baku	Azerbaijan National Academic Opera and Ballet Theatre	With "Jean-Francis Monvoisin"	Javanshir Jafarov	Azerbaijan National Academic Opera and Ballet Theatre`s symphonic orchestra
2014.03.07	United Kingdom, London	London Kings Place	"Sound of Spring"	Sadigova Zulfiyya	
2014.04.19	Azerbaijan, Baku	Heydar Aliyev Palace	"Sevgili Janan"	Javanshir Jafarov	Azerbaijan National Academic Opera and Ballet Theatre`s symphonic orchestra
2015.04.19	Azerbaijan, Baku	Heydar Aliyev Palace	" One Summer Evening "		
2017.07.14	France, Paris	Azerbaijan Art Center	"France National Day"	-	Zulfiyya Sadigova
2018.05.06	Azerbaijan, Baku	Azerbaijan State Academic Philharmonic named after Muslim Magomayev	"Feelings"	-	Saida Taghizada
2018.05.11	Georgia, Tbilisi	State Drama Theater named after Shota Rustaveli	"Concert program dedicated to the 95th anniversary of Heydar Aliyev"	-	Saida Taghizada
2018.05.16	United Kingdom, London	“London Kings Palace”	Concert program consisting of romances of Honored Artist, Composer Adila Huseynzada	-	Saida Taghizada
2018.05.23	Switzerland, Bern	Bellevue Palace	The next concert program on the occasion of the 100th anniversary of the Azerbaijan People's Republic	-	Saida Taghizada
2019.06.04	France, Paris	Center of Culture of Azerbaijan	Concert program of the romances of Adila Huseynzade, Honored Worker of Arts, composer, on the 100th anniversary of women's right to vote in Azerbaijan	-	Saida Taghizada

== Performed concerts and events ==
Date	Country, City	Venue	Concert name	Conducting	Accompaniment
2000.-.-	Turkey,	"TURKSOY" opera days	-		
2005.-.-	Japan, Nagoya	"EXPO 2005" International exhibition	-		
2016.10.-	Germany, Berlin	Berlin Philharmonic	"Azerbaijan Culture Days"	Teymur Goychayev	Azerbaijan State Chamber Orchestra
2016.10.-	Germany, Stuttgart		"Azerbaijan Culture Days"	Teymur Goychayev	Azerbaijan State Chamber Orchestra
2016.10.-	Germany, Mainz		"Azerbaijan Culture Days"	Teymur Goychayev	Azerbaijan State Chamber Orchestra
2016.10.-	Germany, Mainz	Opera Studio of the National Academy of Music of Ukraine	On the occasion of "World Azerbaijani Solidarity Day"		Javan Zeynalli
2009.-.-	Turkey, Mersin	State Museum of Musical Culture of Azerbaijan	The event "dedicated to the 99th anniversary of Niyazi's birth"		
2011.09.18	Italy, Sassari		"Concert of Opera Singers"		
2012.04.16	Italy, Turin		"Azerbaijan Culture Days"		
2012.04.-	Italy, Venice				
2012.04.-	Italy, Milan	Milan Conservatory named after Giuseppe Verdi			
2012.-.-	Italy, Bergamo	Donizetti theater	“Gran Gala” concert	Stefano Miceli	
2012.-.-	Azerbaijan, Baku	Chamber and Organ Music Hall of Azerbaijan State Philharmonic	"Concert of the State Piano Trio"		
2012.-.-	Azerbaijan, Baku	Chamber and Organ Music Hall of Azerbaijan State Philharmonic	"Concert of the State Piano Trio"		
2014.-.-	Azerbaijan, Baku	Chamber and Organ Music Hall of Azerbaijan State Philharmonic	"Concert of the State Piano Trio"		
2015.11.23	Azerbaijan, Baku	"Kapellhaus" organ music hall of the German-Azerbaijani Cultural Union	“Event dedicated to the 75th anniversary of Ruhangiz Gasimova"		
2016.02.14	Azerbaijan, Baku	Azerbaijan State Academic Opera and Ballet Theater	Jahangir Gurbanov's solo concert "Two bodies and one heart"		Symphony Orchestra of Azerbaijan State Academic Opera and Ballet Theater
2016.05.11	United Kingdom, London		Event "in honor of the 90th anniversary of the British Queen Elizabeth II"		
2016.12.20	Belarus, Minsk	Belarusian National Academic Grand Theater of Opera and Ballet	"7th International World Forum"		Symphony Orchestra of Azerbaijan State Academic Opera and Ballet Theater
2017.05.28	Azerbaijan, Baku	Zira Culture Center	"On the occasion of May 28 Republic Day" (with students)		Shahin Yahyazada
2017.06.11	Azerbaijan, Baku	State Music Theater named after Rashid Behbudov	“New voices” (with students)		Shahin Yahyazada and Zulfiyya Sadigova
2017.11.06	Azerbaijan, Baku	State Music Theater named after Rashid Behbudov	"Young Stars" (with students)		Shahin Yahyazada and Zulfiyya Sadigova
2018.03.18	Azerbaijan, Baku	State Music Theater named after Rashid Behbudov	"The sound of spring" (with students)		Shahin Yahyazada
2018.12.15	Azerbaijan, Baku	Azerbaijan State Academic Philharmonic named after Muslim Magomayev	"Duet" (with students)		Shahin Yahyazada
2019.11.04	Switzerland, Bern	Bern Conservatory	Concert on the occasion of the 100th anniversary		Zulfiyya Sadigova

== Vocal Music School named after Fidan Hajiyeva ==
In 2016, Fidan Hajiyeva established a Music Center that proudly bears her name, a dream she had cherished for years. The primary objective of this venture was to create a place for teaching her students, but it quickly garnered substantial interest from aspiring musicians. Fidan Hajiyeva's center primarily focuses on imparting the art of vocal performance and classical music. Moreover, it offers instruction in jazz, classical pop, piano, saxophone, violin, and guitar. The center was initially known as "Fidan Hajiyeva's Music Center" since August 9, 2017.

February 25, 2017, the students of Fidan Hajiyeva held their inaugural concert in the Music Center's study hall, dedicated to the Khojaly genocide. Despite the limited audience, Carol Mary Crofts, the Ambassador of the United Kingdom of Great Britain and Northern Ireland to Azerbaijan, graced the occasion with her presence.

May 28, 2017, Fidan Hajiyeva's students presented their first concert in front of a larger audience at the Zira Culture Center, commemorating the 99th anniversary of the establishment of the Azerbaijan Democratic Republic. An engaging aspect of these concerts is Fidan Hajiyeva performing alongside her students, singing duets and songs in various languages. Her involvement in their early careers provides invaluable support.

To showcase her students' operatic abilities, Fidan Hajiyeva, along with one of her students, delivered an exceptional performance of the "Askar and Gulchohra's aria" from Uzeyir Hajibayov's opera "Arshin Mal Alan,". June 11, 2017, marking the Music Center's one-year anniversary, a concert program titled "New Voices" was presented at the Azerbaijan State Song Theater, named after Rashid Behbudov. This program was distinct in terms of the audience size, performances, and genres. Notable performances included Elchin Aliyev's rendition of "Nessun Dorma" from Giacomo Puccini's opera "Turandot" and Nazrin Hasanzada's performance of the aria "Habanera" from George Bizet's "Carmen."

Fidan Hajiyeva's student Elchin Aliyev, who became the director of the center on August 9, 2017, officially renamed the center to "Vocal Music Center named after Fidan Hajiyeva." On October 3, 2017, Elchin Aliyev played a pivotal role in elevating the center's status to a "school" and was appointed as the school's first director.

October 20, 2018, at the Azerbaijan State Academic Philharmonic named after Muslim Magomayev, People's Artist Fidan Hajiyeva, alongside students of the Vocal Music School, presented a concert program titled "Duet." This event was a testament to the hard work and preparation that the students had undertaken during the summer. The concert featured works by Azerbaijani and world composers and included participants spanning from 5 years old to various age groups, even one student at 67. It was a significant occasion for Fidan Hajiyeva, who sought to support her students in their early artistic journeys.

November 7, 2022, a concert celebrating the 5th anniversary of Fidan Hajiyeva Vocal Music School and the first anniversary of the "Mezzo" women's orchestra took place at the International Mugham Center (IMC). Fidan Hajiyeva, a soloist of the Azerbaijan State Academic Opera and Ballet Theater, commenced the concert with a rendition of the romance "Sevgili Janan" by the legendary Uzeyir Hajibeyli. The event served as an opportunity to acknowledge November 8 - Victory Day, a significant milestone in Azerbaijani history, celebrated in honor of the historic Victory achieved by the brave Army under the leadership of Commander-in-Chief Ilham Aliyev. The evening featured outstanding performances by students from Fidan Hajiyeva's Vocal Music School and the debut of the "Mezzo" women's orchestra. Inspired by Fidan Hajiyeva's opening words, the students displayed their exceptional talents one after the other, ensuring the audience left with a true sense of Victory.
