= Galanin dibinda =

"Qalanın dibində"

Song
- Composer: Said Rustamov

"Galanin dibinda" (Azerbaijani: Qalanın dibində, English: At the foot of the fortress) is an Azerbaijani folk lyric song. It belongs to the round dance genre named "yalli".

The form of the song "Galanin dibinda" is the most popular in the folklore structure (in particular in Azerbaijani) consisting of a pair of periodicities (ААBB). Corresponding to the double holding of a pair of periodicities of each phase, it has as its prototype the principle of the bayt. The basis of its composition is the quarto-quinto-tertz system.

On the foundation of this song, the Russian composer Mikhail Glinka created the Choir for his opera "Ruslan and Lyudmila". So, in 1823 Glinka made a trip to the Caucasus. Getting acquainted with the music of the Caucasus nations left a significant mark on the composer's creative consciousness that was reflected in his later works on oriental themes. Using the song "Galanin dibinda" in his opera is an example of such a reflection.

The songs intonations are heard in the operetta of the Azerbaijani composer Uzeyir Hajibeyov "Arshin Mal Alan", in the chorus of girls from the second act.

The song was recorded on the notes written by the Azerbaijani composer Said Rustamov.

There is an Azerbaijani dance with the same name performed on the music of the song.

== Text ==
Azerbaijani	English translation
Qalanın dibində yıxıldım, yatdım, Yuxuda yarıma hey, baxdım, baxdım, Qalada başqadır sevginin dadı, Sevənin açılar qolu-qanadı. Anama deyin ki, atımı satsın, Nişanlım göyçәkdir qoy evdә qalsın. Qalanın dibindә bir quş olaydım, Gedәnə-gәlənә yoldaş olaydım.	Somehow, under the fortress, I suddenly dozed off In dreams, you cant see enough of your beloved. On the fortress tower everything is different, Its here to take wings for everyone in love. Tell my mother to sell my horse, Tell my mother to sell my horse, Id just become a bird under the fortress, And with every passer-by Id become friends.

== See also ==
- Ayrılıq
- No moles left in Irevan
- Şuşanın dağları başı dumanlı

== Literature ==
- İsazada, Ahmad (1987). Aleksandr Xodzkonun "Koroğlu" eposu haqqında" kitabında Azərbaycan xalq musiqisi nümunələri / Samples of Azerbaijani folk music in Khodzko's book about the epos "Koroghlu". Baku: Известия Академии наук Азербайджанской ССР. Серия литературы, языка и искусства.
- Karagicheva-Bretanitskaya, Lyudmila (1997). "Бродячий напев или устойчивый мелодический тип?". Music Academy . 1.
