= Nazim Rzayev =

Azerbaijani conductor (1925–2006)

- Born: February 19, 1925; Baku, Baku uyezd, Azerbaijan SSR, TSFSR, USSR
- Died: May 2, 2006 (aged 81) Eskişehir, Turkey
- Genres: classical music
- Occupations: conductor, concertmaster, pedagogue
- Instrument: violin
- Education: Moscow State Tchaikovsky Conservatory
- Awards: People's Artist of the Azerbaijan SSR Honored Artist of the Azerbaijan SSR Azerbaijan SSR State Prize Order of the Badge of Honour

Nazim Asadulla oghlu Rzayev (Azerbaijani: Nazim Əsədulla oğlu Rzayev, February 14, 1925 – May 2, 2006) was an Azerbaijani conductor, head of the chamber orchestra of the Azerbaijani television and radio, People's Artist of the Azerbaijan SSR, laureate of the USSR and Azerbaijan State Prizes, professor.

== Biography ==
Nazim Rzayev was born on February 14, 1925, in Baku. In 1951, he graduated from the Moscow State Tchaikovsky Conservatory on violin. After returning to Baku, he worked as an orchestra concertmaster at the Azerbaijan State Academic Opera and Ballet Theater and as a chamber class teacher at the Azerbaijan State Conservatory. In 1958 he switched from performing to conducting. A year later, he took an active part in the preparation of the Decade of Azerbaijani Literature and Art in Moscow.

Rzayev was an intern at the Bolshoi Theatre in Moscow in 1961–1963 under the direction of People's Artist of the USSR Aleksandr Melik-Pashayev. After returning to Baku, he headed the opera studio of the Azerbaijan State Conservatory. Under his leadership, Domenico Cimarosa's Il matrimonio segreto, Uzeyir Hajibeyov's Koroghlu and Fikret Amirov's Sevil operas were performed in the studio. Rzayev also took part in the activities of the Hajibeyov Azerbaijan State Symphony Orchestra. He conducted works by Beethoven, Tchaikovsky, Brahms, Strauss, Gara Garayev, Fikret Amirov and other composers.

Rzayev began to work as the artistic director and chief conductor of the chamber orchestra of the Azerbaijan Television and Radio in 1964. The orchestra led by him performed Uzeyir Hajibeyov's novel Without You, Aisha's dance in Gara Garayev's ballet Seven Beauties and girls' dance from the ballet The Path of Thunder. Later, Gara Garayev's Third Symphony and Classical Suite, Fikret Amirov's Nizami Symphony, Gulustan-Bayati-Shiraz mugham and Arabian Nights ballet took an important place in the conductor's repertoire.

Rzayev toured with a chamber orchestra in a number of cities of the USSR and abroad. During the 1984–1985 theater season, he was the founding conductor of Uzeyir Hajibeyov's musical comedy Arshin Mal Alan at the Ankara State Opera and Ballet Theater. In the following years he worked in Turkey.

He was also engaged in pedagogical activities, and since 1952 had taught at the Azerbaijan State Conservatory. He became an associate professor in 1968 and a professor in 1985.

Rzayev died on May 2, 2006, in Eskişehir.

== Awards ==
- People's Artist of the Azerbaijan SSR – June 29, 1977
- Honored Artist of the Azerbaijan SSR – April 29, 1958
- USSR State Prize – November 6, 1980
- Azerbaijan SSR State Prize – April 26, 1974
- Order of the Badge of Honour – June 9, 1959
- Honorary Decree of the Presidium of the Supreme Soviet of the Azerbaijan SSR – December 9, 1966; July 7, 1967; February 24, 1979; June 14, 1985
