= Aida Huseynova =

Azerbaijani musicologist (1964–2022)

Aida Huseynova (1964 or 1965 – 20 June 2022) was a musicologist, pianist, and ethnomusicologist from Azerbaijan.

She spent the last decade and a half of her career teaching in the Music in General Studies program at Indiana University Bloomington and serving as an arts consultant for Yo-Yo Ma's Silk Road Ensemble, the Mike Morris Dance group, and other ensembles and initiatives.

Huseynova died in Istanbul on 20 June 2022 aged 57.

== Early life and education ==
Huseynova was raised in Baku, where she attended the Baku State Conservatory (now the Hajibeyov Baku Academy of Music) and received her bachelor's degree in 1987. One of her professors was the composer and pianist Elmira Nazirova. Huseynova identified Nazirova as an inspiration for Dmitri Shostakovich's Tenth Symphony.

Huseynova earned her PhD from the St. Petersburg Conservatory in 1992, finishing her doctoral studies during the collapse of the Soviet Union. Her doctoral dissertation examined the Azerbaijani composer Muslim Magomayev.

== Career ==
During the 1990s, Huseynova taught at the Baku State Conservatory. In the 2000s, she held positions at the Jacobs School of Music, Indiana University—Bloomington, including as a Fulbright Scholar, and eventually joined the faculty of the Music in General Studies program. Among the courses she taught were Music of the Silk Road, Music of Russia, and East-West Encounters in Music, and Popular Music of Europe and Asia.

The fusion of Azerbaijani musical traditions, particularly mugham, with Western classical music, jazz, and popular music was of abiding interest to Huseynova. Her scholarship drew upon the critical paradigms of the Azerbaijani music educator and founder of the Baku State Conservatory Uzeyir Hajibeyli, whose opera Leyli and Majnun was a focal point of her scholarship and creative work.

She published scholarship in Russian, Azerbaijani, and English. Her major English-language monograph was Music of Azerbaijan: From Mugham to Opera (Bloomington: Indiana University Press, 2016).

A public scholar, Huseynova was a speaker at concerts and other events that engaged audiences beyond the academic realm. She appeared at the International Festival and Symposium of Contemporary Music's “Icebreaker III: The Caucasus” and served on the advisors’ committee of the Sixth Annual San Francisco World Music Festival. In 2018, Huseynova was part of the MusicUnitesUS residency of Fargana Qasimova at Brandeis University.
