= Tamilla Shiraliyeva =

Azerbaijani actress and ballet master (1946–2025)

- Tamilla Xudadat qızı Şirəliyeva
- Born: 8 December 1946; Baku, Azerbaijan SSR, USSR
- Died: 12 March 2025 (aged 78); Baku, Azerbaijan
- Burial place: Yasamal cemetery
- Occupation(s): Ballet dancer, ballet master, pedagogue
- Awards: People's Artiste of the Azerbaijan SSR • USSR State Prize • Shohrat Order

Tamilla Shiraliyeva (Azerbaijani: Tamilla Xudadat qızı Şirəliyeva; 8 December 1946 – 12 March 2025) was an Azerbaijani ballet dancer, ballet master and pedagogue who was named the People's Artiste of the Azerbaijan SSR in 1978. Shiraliyeva was also a recipient of the USSR State Prize in 1980 and a Shohrat Order in 2006.

== Background ==
Shiraliyeva was born on 8 December 1946 in Baku, Azerbaijan SSR, Soviet Union (now Azerbaijan). She graduated from the Baku Choreographic College in 1964. She later attended the Moscow State Academy of Choreography in 1968.

Tamilla Shiraliyeva had been suffering from diabetes for a long time and had undergone surgery because of kidney problems. She died from a brain hemorrhage in Baku, on 12 March 2025, at the age of 78, and was buried in the Yasamal cemetery.

== Career ==
Shiralieyeva began her career as a soloist in 1964 for the ballet troupe of the Azerbaijan State Academic Opera and Ballet Theater, performing in several pieces including Ashraf Abbasov's Chernushka and Fikret Amirov's One Thousand and One Nights. She retired from ballet dancing in 1989; she became a teacher and choreographer the following year.

In 2001, Shiralieyeva was the producer-choreographer in the revival of Tofig Bakikhanov's Caspian Ballad at the Azerbaijan State Academic Opera and Ballet Theater, which premiered on 4 November 2001.

She directed, choreographed, or managed several pieces including Tofig Bakikhanov's Good and Evil, and Joseph Mazilier's Paquita. On 13 July 2007, Shiralieyeva directed in a special showing of Agshin Alizadeh's Tour of the Caucuses to celebrate his 70th birthday. She also choreographed a ballet based upon Niyazi's Rast for the Silk Road Music Festival in July 2014.

== Awards ==
Shiraliyeva was named an Honored Artist of the Azerbaijan SSR in 1970. In 1978, she was titled the People's Artiste of the Azerbaijan SSR. Shiraliyeva also received the USSR State Prize in 1980 for her role as Scheherazade in One Thousand and One Nights.

In 2006, Azerbaijani president Ilham Aliyev thanked Shiraliyeva for her contributions to ballet and awarded her a Shohrat Order. She also received an honorary diploma from the Baku Choreographic Academy for her work at the academy.
