= Sevil (opera) =

Opera by Fikrat Amirov

- Opera by Fikret Amirov
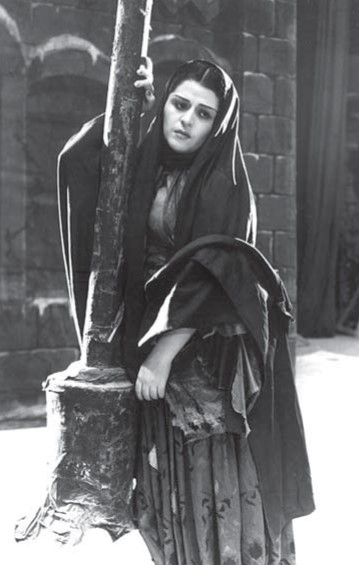
- 1959 poster
- Librettist: Talat Eyyubov
- Language: Azerbaijani
- Based on: Sevil by Jafar Jabbarly
- Premiere: 25 December 1953; Baku

Sevil is a lyrical psychological drama opera written in 1949–1952 with music by Fikret Amirov to a libretto by Talat Eyyubov based on Jafar Jabbarly's play Sevil. The premiere of the opera was held on December 25, 1953, at the Azerbaijan State Opera and Ballet Theater.

Sevil is the first Azerbaijani opera written in a modern lyrical and psychological genre. The melody, which is the main expression of Fikrat Amirov's work, plays an emotional beginning in the music of the opera. The composer used a variety of musical forms in the opera – aria, arioso, ensembles and choral episodes.

== History ==
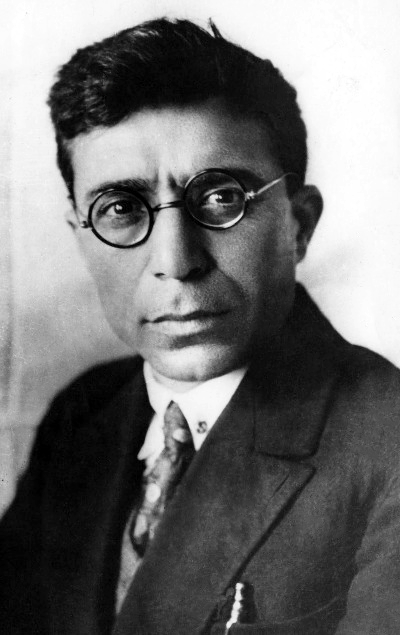
Jafar Jabbarly

Fikrat Amirov started the opera in 1949. Writing the opera's libretto, the poet Talat Eyyubov tried to keep the play's main essence. Some scenes of the play have been combined with the requirements of the opera genre, and the work has been compact.

Fikret Amirov, who mainly kept the idea and plot of Jafar Jabbarly's play, made some changes to deepen the social features. The second scene incorporates non-revolutionary demonstration scenes, a prologue at the beginning of the opera, and scenes from the third scene. The work also features other opera genres (especially the historical genre).

Taking into consideration the development, composition, dramatic structure of events in the opera, etc., it seems the composer has benefited from classics, in particular the traditions of Pyotr Ilyich Tchaikovsky's dramatics. However, the compositional methods of classical operas are synthesized in the opera Sevil with the national folklore of the musical language and with all modern intonation vocabulary.

== Music ==
The opera combines two opposing social forces, represented by the progressive group of characters (Sevil and her friends) and the “dying world” (Balash and his environment). The contradictions of the social and psychological merits of the participants create a contradiction between the image-thematic and the compositional structure in the opera.

The work originally consisted of 4 scenes. But later it was edited by the author to adapt to the 3- and 2-page versions.

The work consists of an introduction, three acts, and two drawings. The first act features Sevil's sad arias and song. Arias is written in the spirit of folk songs.

The second act consists of three parts. The third part is march music, which consists of separate replicas of Sevil in the background of “Warszawianka”.

The orchestra entry to Aria is based on the personal tragedy of Sevil and Balash (main characters). The theme of the first part is bayat-shiraz.

The final duo of Sevil and Balash is still on their personal tragedy leitmotif. In the final edit, the scene ends with this duet.

The dramatic conflict in the opera is based on the discovery of two conflicting character groups. The first group is represented by the people, and the second group is the vulgar environment. Representatives of the vulgar environment are opened in a comic-satirical manner by Abdulbay and Mammadali bay. At the opening of the pair, grotesque cartoons sometimes appear. In the duo of Abdulbay and Mammadali bay, the dining genre features. The waltz, one of the brightest instrumental numbers in the opera, has an important role.

== Scene design and choreography ==
The chief artist of the theater, Eyyub Fataliyev designed the play according to the idea and content. Honored Art Worker Badura created costume designs for Afghan opera.

Nijat Malikov and Razia Yusifova, the choreographers of the theater, worked on the chorus with enthusiasm and managed to make it sound good. The chorus in the second act, the final chorus, the prologue, and the epilogue, were particularly influential. Conductor assistant – Honored Artist, orchestra concertmaster Nazim Rzayev has performed various works on string instruments.

The People's Artist, Stalin Prize Laureate, artistic director, Niyazi masterfully opened the composer's compositions, created harmony between the orchestra and individual soloists, choral and dance, and promoted orchestrated professionalism.

== Characters ==
- Sevil – the protagonist, soprano
- Balash – Sevil's husband, tenor
- Gulush – Balash's sister, mezzo-soprano
- Atakishi – Balashin's father, baritone
- Grandfather – Sevil's father, tenor
- Dilbar – Balashin's colleague, coloratura soprano
- Abdullu bay – a waster man, bass-baritone
- Mammadali bay – a waster man, tenor
- Gunduz – Son of Balas and Sevil

== Premiere ==
The first premiere of the opera Sevil took place on December 25, 1953. Before the first performance, two public reviews were held. On December 21 of the same year, the second public performance of the opera was held. The composition of the performance was given by the People's Artist of the USSR Mehdi Mammadov. The conductor was Afrasiyab Badalbeyli, an Honored Art Worker. The artistic composition of the performance was performed by Honored Art figures Anvar Almaszade and Izzet Seyidova. The performers were Vera Abisheva (Sevil), Rashid Behbudov (Balash).

== See also ==
- Opera in Azerbaijan
- List of Azerbaijani opera singers
