= Farhad Ebrahimi =

Iranian poet and songwriter (1935–2019)

Farhad Ebrahimi رجب ابراهیمی کورعباسلو
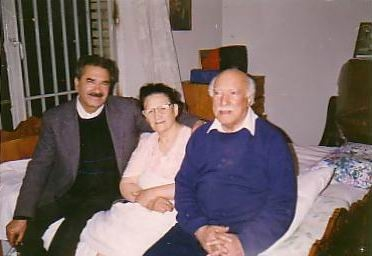
- Ali Salimi (Right) – Farhad Ebrahimi (Left)

Background information
- Also known as: Rajab Ebrahimi Korabbaslu (Kurabazli)
- Born: 1935; Ardabil, Imperial State of Iran
- Origin: Iranian
- Died: 9 February 2019 (aged 83–84)
- Genre: Iranian Azari
- Occupations: Poet, writer, songwriter

Farhad Ebrahimi (Persian: فرهاد ابراهیمی کورعباسلو, born Rajab Ebrahimi Persian: رجب ابراهیمی کورعباسلو; 1935 – 9 February 2019) was an Iranian poet, writer, and songwriter of the Iranian azari style music. His most important work is the lyrics to Ayrılıq ("Separation") a song that has been performed by many singers, such as Ali Salimi (who wrote the music), and Googoosh.
