= Kurd Ovshari =

Kurd Ovshari (Azerbaijani: Kürd ovşarı) is a symphonic mugham composed in 1948, by Azerbaijani composer Fikret Amirov. In 1949, Fikrat Amirov was conferred the USSR State Prize for composing “Kurd ovshari” and “Shur” mughams.

In 1960, the London Symphony Orchestra and the Philadelphia Orchestra conducted by Leopold Stokowski, performed “Kurd ovshari” symphonic mugham. Recording discs with this mugham performed by the Boston Symphony Orchestra and Leipzig Gewandhaus Orchestra were released.
