= Arabian Nights (ballet) =

1979 ballet

- Choreographer: Naila Nazirova
- Music: Fikret Amirov
- Libretto: Magsud Ibrahimbeyov; Rustam Ibragimbekov
- Based on: The tales of One Thousand and One Nights
- Premiere: 1979; Azerbaijan State Academic Opera and Ballet Theater
- Design: Togrul Narimanbeyov
- Genre: Tale
- Type: classic

One Thousand and One Nights (sometimes referred to as Arabian Nights) Arabian Nights is a two-part ballet written in 1979. The music of the ballet was written by Fikret Amirov, and the libretto was written by Magsud and Rustam Ibrahimbeyov based on the fairy tale " Arabian Nights”. The premiere of the ballet took place in 1979 at the Azerbaijan State Academic Opera and Ballet Theater.

Music, choreography, libretto and artistic design are in organic unity in the ballet written on the basis of Arabic tales. Captivating melodies, colorful harmonic language and orchestration, the alternation of sincere lyrical scenes with folk scenes and household scenes are the main features of the Arabian Nights ballet. One of the main highlights of the ballet is the use of the female voice in the timbre dramaturgy. At the beginning of the ballet, the women's chorus, which sounds against the background of the orchestra's gentle, charming flowing intonations, is sad, but reflects the belief in bright dreams and devotion.

"Arabian Nights" is a deep philosophical play. It is a hymn to woman, her love and wisdom. Expressing very complex and deep ideas through dance is the greatest achievement of the composer in this genre.

== History ==
=== Source and topics ===
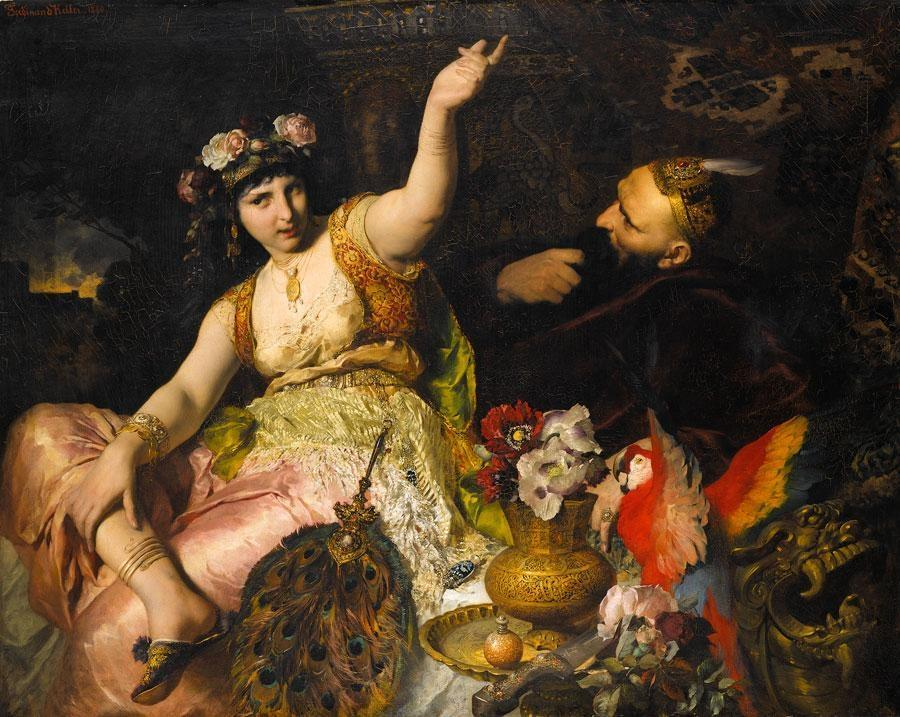
Shahrizade telling tales to Shahriyar. Artist: Ferdinand Keller. 1880

The main rock of F. Amirov's ballet is the "Arabian Nights" tales with an ancient history, the cruel Shahriyar and the wise Shahrizade, the intelligence, bravery and kindness of the Eastern woman, and her victory with the strength of all these aspects. In ballet, there are many conflicts and moments of contrast. The emotional palette of the play is very rich: brutality and tenderness, hatred and love, death and joy meet here.

Authors of the libretto, Maqsud and Rustam Ibrahimbeyov, took the main point of the tale and managed to reveal its philosophical essence. Therefore, the red line here is the struggle between good and evil and the celebration of mercy. Compared to the original collection of fairy tales, the number of tales and characters in the ballet has been reduced. Mainly, three tales were used, which have an initial exposition, a conclusion, a finale, and also an independent theme. The fairy tales used are "Sindibad and the Magical Emerald Bird", "Aladdin and the Beautiful Here", "Alibaba and the Forty Thieves".

Fikret Amirov's work "A Thousand Nights" opened a new stage in the history of Azerbaijani ballet. Thus, in this work, the traditions of multi-act play and small-form ballets are combined. The composer was already an accomplished symphonist when he wrote in the ballet genre. In his work, in general, the symphonic way of thinking was formed by benefiting from the traditions of eastern culture. Deep philosophical concept, accuracy and logic of the author's thinking are the most remarkable points in the ballet "Arabian Nights", which is a very colorful and bright work. The dramaturgy of the ballet is born from the concept of this work, which is based on a rare monument of the peoples of the East. In other words, there are two worlds here: real and fairy-tale world. F. Amirov uses classical forms in this ballet and connects them in complete melodic and rhythm-intonation complexes.

Fikret Amirov, the author of ballet music, says in an interview that

The philosophical wisdom, humanistic ideas, and humanity of this outstanding monument of this medieval Arabic literature inspired me to create a ballet. The play was conceived as a eulogy to a woman, her wisdom, and spiritual beauty. The authors of the libretto, brothers Maqsud and Rustam Ibrahimbeyov, have made a great contribution to the solution. They offered very interesting dramaturgical material. In the performance, the most precious pearls of the treasury of fairy tales, the pearls reflecting women's intelligence, benevolence, and loyalty in love, have been gilded with the language of music and plastic.

=== Writing ===
Arabian Nights ballet is a special stage in Fikret Amirov's creativity. Fikret Amirov, who usually takes the artistic content of his works from subjects close to the people, while writing the Thousand and One Nights ballet, remained faithful to the tradition and turned to the folk tales. S. Tahmiragizi notes that "the composer glorifies his thoughts, ideas of love and loyalty with the language of this epic genre." F. Amirov made the following statement in one of his interviews about the reasons for turning to the plot of "Arabian Nights" Arabic fairy tales:

The theme of Arabian Nights has not left me alone for many years. This immortal monument of art, rich in wise ideas, kneaded with the great love of life and high feelings of the East, has inspired many artists and will undoubtedly continue to inspire.

One of the most valuable pearls of world folklore, the choreographic embodiment of the Arabian fairy tale "Arabian Nights" required F. Amirov's high mastery and creative courage as a composer. Because, before Amirov, the famous Russian composer N. A. Rimsky-Korsakov, who has a special place in the history of world music, and the French composer M. Ravel also created famous works addressing the themes of "Arabian Nights".

In general, the subject of the East has always interested F. Amirov. Music for the drama "Sheikh Sanan" by H. Javid, "Concert on Arabic Themes for Piano and Orchestra" written jointly with Elmira Nazirova, "A Thousand Nights" after the symphonic mugham "Gulustan-Bayati-Shiraz" inspired by the works of the great poets of the Middle East, Sadi and Hafiz. The ballet was another embodiment of the composer's attitude to the Arab world and Arab culture.

Before starting work on the ballet, the composer traveled to Iran, Iraq, Turkey, Egypt, Syria, Morocco and India, and was in close contact with the Middle Eastern culture. During his visits to these countries, Amirov noticed a number of commonalities in professional music with an oral tradition. Amirov's constant contact with Arabic music, in particular, encouraged him to understand the similarities between Azerbaijani folk music and the music of eastern peoples.

The choice of F. Amirov's "Arabian Nights" fairy tales is determined by a number of factors, among which the composer's love for oriental fairy tales and the materials collected from the music of Arab countries are among the main conditions. The composer explains the reason for addressing this topic as follows:

I had other creative issues in front of me. I was writing "Oriental-Arabic" music based on an Azerbaijani composer who was in close contact with the culture of many eastern peoples. Therefore, it makes no sense to look for these or other specific Arab melodies as a primary source in the ballet.

F. Amirov, who loves intense contrasts, expressive and emotional comparisons in his work, uses those qualities in "A Thousand Nights". According to R. Zohrabov, "In the music of the ballet, three natural qualities attract more attention: figurative plasticity, bright melodic language; rhythmicity arising from the nature of character and movements, elements of folk dance music; the color that characterizes the colors and shades of his music. All this, the composer moves away from the "numbered" system and manifests the symphonic development in large, detailed scenes."

== Music ==
The ballet Arabian Nights consists of an introduction and two acts. These two veils are in sharp contrast by their nature. Already the first bars of the orchestra seem to take the listener to the world of magical fairy tales. The combination of harp and piano with percussion in the high register creates a beautiful harmony.

Against this background, one of the leading themes of the ballet - the theme of love - emerges. This topic has a great emotional meaning in the work as a hymn to the ethical beginning. The theme of love covers the whole composition. Its creation is based on the register variation of a single intonation that passes through different stages of the image, appearing each time at the highest level of emotional tension. The beginning is derived from the staged mugham dramaturgy in the intonation development of musical thought. In the intro, this theme is painted with lyrical tones, and when a female chorus joins it backstage, it takes on an exciting mood. At the end of the first act, when Shahrizad meets Shahriyar, this theme sounds very broad. Throughout the ballet, the theme of love overcomes all the obstacles that stand in its way. In the finale, this theme completely dominates the orchestra, is renewed in tone, emotional aspect and is sounded in a competent, solemn C major. Musicologist V. Sharifova-Alikhanova characterizes the theme of love as follows: "This theme is also the epigraph of the ballet, as if it is an emotional camera that determines the content of the image."

One of the highlights of the intro is the addition of vocals performed by a female choir. On the one hand, this voice is the sound of a wonderful fairy tale world, and on the other hand, it is an echo of the distant past. The addition of sound to ballet in particular depends on several factors. On the one hand, this method is typical for the composer. Thus, F. Amirov used the human voice in the symphonic mugam "Gulustan-Bayati-Shiraz" and in the ballet "Nasimi dastani". In "Epic of Nasimi", it is the voice of the reciter, the female chorus, and the lyrical-dramatic tenor. In this work, the composer uses the voice in the most important moments from a dramaturgical point of view.

During dramatic climaxes and tense scenes, the composer's addition of the soprano and the chorus to the ballet makes certain situations and circumstances seem believable and natural. Each time its sound instills a tense emotional state into the development of the choreography.

The use of a woman's voice in the "Arabian Nights" ballet has a certain meaning. A woman is a symbol of high beauty and sublimity in Eastern poetry. Here, Shahrizad is embodied in such a sense. The theme of the vocal is heard twice more throughout the ballet. For the first time, the chorus expresses the "angry and sadness of women condemned to death". Then, a solo female voice is heard in the "Duet of Shahriyar and Shahrizad" scene.

The first act is mainly based on contrasts. At the beginning of the arrival of Shahriyar and Nurida on the stage, the timbre of the drums sounds. This lyrical scene is built on a cantilena melody. The next scene, "Orgy", is a tableau with great symphonic development. Here, themes are built from short motifs and sharp syncopated rhythms. The themes are superimposed, the ostinato turns into a rhythmic formula, quick passages. Suddenly, Shahriyar appears, his monologue reveals the sufferings of a deluded man. The mental state of the hero is expressed by the intonations of the jahargah lad. After the "Dance of the Executioners", a symbol of Shahriyar's cruel decision, a sad unison chorus of women sounds. Their singing is based on "Lamentation".

Shahrizad's sudden arrival takes place against the background of the theme of love. The sharp dissonant chord of the horns sounds like Shahrizad's stubborn voice. The first act is completed with this scene.

The first act moves appropriately from traditional ballet forms towards the finale, closing with musical and plot developments. The second act of the ballet is structured as a suite from three tales of Shahrizad. Although it is set in the form of a suite, symphonic is the main thing here. The three tales are perceived as "a ballet within a ballet".

Shahriyar, Shahrizadeh, the characters of the first act, executioners, women in bright blue clothes symbolizing the night also participate in the second act. These characters create wholeness and completeness in the ballet, removing the feature of diversion.

The introduction to all three tales in the second act is a description of a southern night. The ending of each tale is completed by the rhythm of the executioners and the anger of Shahriyar, who is about to kill Shahrizad. The music of the tales is very figurative and programmatic. It features nature scenes, fantastical creatures, a seashore, a pirate dance, love scenes, and more. The music of the tales is descriptive in nature, where an improvisational style of expression rather than a traditional structure is the key. In general, in the second act, various variations of short motifs are applied. The composer creates many variants from a rhythm-intonation seed.

The three tales in the second act of the ballet carry a great burden of meaning. The tales here directly prepare the evolution of Shahriyar's spiritual changes. It is the idea of good triumphing over evil in these tales that improves Shahriyar internally, and a sense of love and justice is established in the heart of the cruel ruler. Therefore, the lyrical duet between Shahriyar and Shahrizad at the end of the ballet sounds very emotional. Shahrizad wins Shahriyar with her wisdom, intelligence and strength of will. Artistic content finds its full expression in musical language.

=== Instrumentation ===
In connection with the plot of the ballet, the composer skillfully creates the color of the music of the Middle East region in the ballet. Here the percussion group is given ample space. Thus, in addition to traditional percussion instruments, specific and rare instruments are also used in ballet. There are even scenes where the composer uses only percussion instruments.

The non-traditional 8/8, 10/8, 12/8 metric systems found in the score are characteristic of the musical thinking of the Middle Eastern peoples and give a special variety to the orchestral palette. The composer, in addition to being addicted to the beauty of the musical folklore of the Eastern peoples, searched for extremely rich rhythms and revived them in music. F. Amirov used these rhythms both in the orchestra and on separate percussion instruments - drums, vibraphones, timpani, and solos.

== Stage design and choreography ==
"Arabian Nights" ballet is a fairy-tale-romantic ballet. The artist of the play, Togrul Narimanbeyov, gave the ballet a beautiful arrangement, used bright color effects, rich colors. The use of restrained and at the same time dull colors, the clothes of the condemned women, and even Shahriyar's clothes are given a dark color at the beginning of the play, and a light color towards the end, has a certain symbolic meaning.

Tahmiragizi notes that "the very unusual arrangement of the play can be called a symphony of colors." The unique shades used by the artist take the viewer to the world of magic and fairy tales. The artist's palette is not satisfied with the effects of dazzling brightness and soft elegance. Following the plot, he creates a gamut of colors. The arrangement's palette, given in bright, major tones, is in harmony with the spirit of the tale.

In addition to classical, national and mass dances, game episodes and acrobatic elements are also given in the choreography of the performance. In ballet, there are two points that stand out from the point of view of the musical language: first, the rhythm dominates throughout the piece. The rhythm almost rests on the surface of the play's music. The rhythmic formula appears for the first time in the dance of the Archers, then it is heard in the dance of the Executioners, Shahriyar's monologue and mass dances. This rhythm is constantly maintained in all musical pieces, which are traditional for the palace environment.

Shahriyar's monologue is dominated by "stretched" second intonations. These intonations are already felt in the introduction to Shahrizad's theme, are mentioned in Shahriyar's monologue and always accompany the image. In the course of events, the intonations of the second penetrate even the party of Nurida, Shahriyar's wife.

F. Amirov was able to find the "music of rhythm" or "rhythmic melody" in the rhythmic face - gestures, facial expressions, gait, plasticity of hands during conversation and other situations of fairy tale characters. All these are considered the main factor of the musical-choreographic performance. "translated" his tales into a kind of music and dance language.

== Roles ==
- Shahrizada
- Shahriyar
- Nurida, Shahriyar's wife
- Girl
- Spirit bird
- Sinbad the Sailor
- Aladdin
- This is beautiful
- A cruel witch
- demon
- Ram chief of the Forty Bandits
- Alibaba
- Marjana
- Executioners, archers, people, bandits

=== Shahrizada ===
Combining intelligence and wisdom, Shahrizade is also loyal and beautiful. Despite this, he faces a ruthless king who has been betrayed and whose heart is filled with anger. After learning that the shah before her had caused the death of thousands of innocent young girls, Shahrizade decided to put an end to this unjust massacre by risking her life.

Agreeing with the Shah, Shahrizade agrees to face her betrayal only after the end of the story she is going to tell. In this way, Shahrizade, who takes the king to the world of fairy tales that lasts for 1001 nights, succeeds in arousing trust and love in the king's cruel heart with the help of fairy-tale heroes. Thus, he saves both himself and all women.

=== Shahriyar ===
The young and majestic Shah Shahriyar bids farewell to his beloved wife and goes hunting. Unexpectedly returning to the palace, the king sees his wife in the hands of a slave. The deceived husband, the humiliated ruler, in front of the eyes of the witnesses, frozen by this disgrace, takes the couch to his wife and gives a terrible decree to execute all the young women.

The pleas of the women who were unjustly condemned to death did not quench the anger of the angry king. After some time, Shahrizade, who combines beauty and wisdom, enters the world of the king's anger. At this time, it seems like a miracle happens. Feelings of love begin to awaken in Shahriyar's cruel heart. However, even if she loves, she does not change her decision - death awaits Shahrizad. The fight between reason and anger and love and hate begins. Shahriyar does not want to give up suddenly. In order to regain faith in his former love and kindness, he enters Shahrizad's mysterious fairy-tale world and spends a thousand and one nights.

=== The libretto ===
This story took place very anciently, during the reign of royalty, in an environment where unfaithfulness to love was punishable by death, and the customs and traditions of the past people were completely different from the present.

=== The first act ===
According to an ancient legend, one day the mighty Shah Shahriyar said goodbye to his wife and went hunting. Unexpectedly returning to the palace, the king finds his wife in the arms of one of his servants. Having sentenced his wife to death, the king made a terrible decision and ordered the execution of one of the young ladies in the palace every day.

During that period, Shahrizade, who combines beauty and wisdom, enters the king's world of cruelty and anger. Love rises in Shahriyar's cruel heart. But even this tender feeling does not soften the king's cruel heart, and he says that Shahrizade should be executed, like thousands of women who have been punished. Shahrizade decides to tell tales to the Shah for a thousand and one nights.

=== The second act ===
==== Sinbad the Sailor and the Ruhh Bird ====
A strong storm casts the famous sailor Sindbad on a deserted island. Coming to his senses, Sinbad meets the Bird of Joy, which brightens the lives of everyone it meets. However, the Bird of Joy is sad because it is pursued by its cruel enemy, the Bird of Ruhh. However, Sinbad heroically fights the bird of Spirit and wins and frees the bird of Joy from its captivity. After that, the bright light of the Bird of Joy begins to illuminate the hearts of Sinbad and all pure-hearted people.

==== Beautiful Budur and Aladdin ====
Eastern market. Suddenly a strong sound of zuhrs is heard. Under the protection of the guards, the daughter of the local ruler, sitting under the Canopy, passes. Representatives of the people are forbidden to look at it, and those who violate the ban are punished by death. Unable to control himself, Aladdin breaks the ban and falls in love with Prince Budur at first sight. Young Budur also likes Aladdin. Suddenly, a scheming Moor appears, wishing to seize Aladdin's magic lamp. The Moor separates the lovers. However, in the confrontation with Maghribli, Aladdin gains the upper hand, and the loyal genie from the lamp helps to bring back the beautiful Budur.

==== Alibaba and 40 slaves ====
Alibaba accidentally learns a secret about a magical cave. Entering the cave, Alibaba steals a bag of gold looted by bandits. Knowing this, the robbers start chasing him to take revenge. Alibaba is hiding in his house. The faithful Marjana, who loves her husband, tries to help him. The ram leader of the robbers comes to Alibaba's house in the name of an honored guest to kill him. Marjana, who made a cunning plan, welcomes the guest with a smile and kindness. Marjana dances in front of the guest and charms him with her beauty. As soon as possible, he kills with a dagger. Next time, good will win over evil and reason will win over ignorance.

==== Epilogue ====
Even after listening to Shahrizade's beautiful stories about love and loyalty, Shahriyar's angry heart does not find peace. Love and jealousy are fighting in his heart. Shah decides to go hunting again. The Shah is interested in Shahrizade's ability to show loyalty, he wants to believe that good does not triumph over evil only in beautiful fairy tales. Returning from the hunt, Shahriyar sees Shahrizade surrounded by his beautiful fairy-tale heroes. Since that day, love, trust and kindness dominate Shahriyar's heart.

== Structure ==
The structure presented below is the original structure of Amirov's ballet. The titles for each number are taken from the original publication of the structure of the ballet. Some of the numbers are titled with simple musical cues and the original French titles have not been translated.

=== Introduction ===
Lento – Amore

=== The first act ===
1. Duet of Shahriyar and Nurida: Andante
2. Dance of the Archers: Sveltezza
3. Variation of Shahriyar: Esaltato
4. Nurida's monologue: Moderato ancioso
5. Orgy: Presto – vivace
6. Death of Shahriyar and Nurida: Andante moderato
7. Shahriyar's monologue: Andante tragico
8. Dance of the executioners: Andante duramente
9. Shahriyar's Wrath: Allegro irato
10. Executioners chasing women: Inferhale – Lamento
11. Women's prayer and supplication: Adagio – pianto suplicare
12. Shahriyar's fury: Allegro feroce
13. Shahrizade: Allegretto grazioso
14. Shahriyar and Shahrizade's duet: Lento – Amore

=== The second act ===
15. Night: Lento – Goncitato
16. First Tale: The Maiden, Sinbad the Sailor, and the Spirit Bird: Adagio limpido
17. Dance of the executioners: Andante duramente
18. Night: Lento-Concitato
19. The second tale: Aladdin and the magic lamp: Allegretto brillante
  1. The market of Baghdad
20. Dance of the executioners: Andante duramente
21. Night: Lento-Concitato
23. Third Tale: Alibaba and the Forty Thieves: Allegro vivace
  1. Persecution
  2. Dance of the Coral: Andante splendidezza
24. Shahriyar and executioners: Allegro elevato
  1. Shahriyar in the world of fairy tales
25. Duet of Shahriyar and Shahrizadeh: Adagio amoroso
26. Archers: Sveltezza
27. Shahrizade's monologue: Moderato con anima
28. Shahrizade's feast: Allegretto festante
29. Finale: Allegretto elevato

== Staging ==
=== Premiere ===
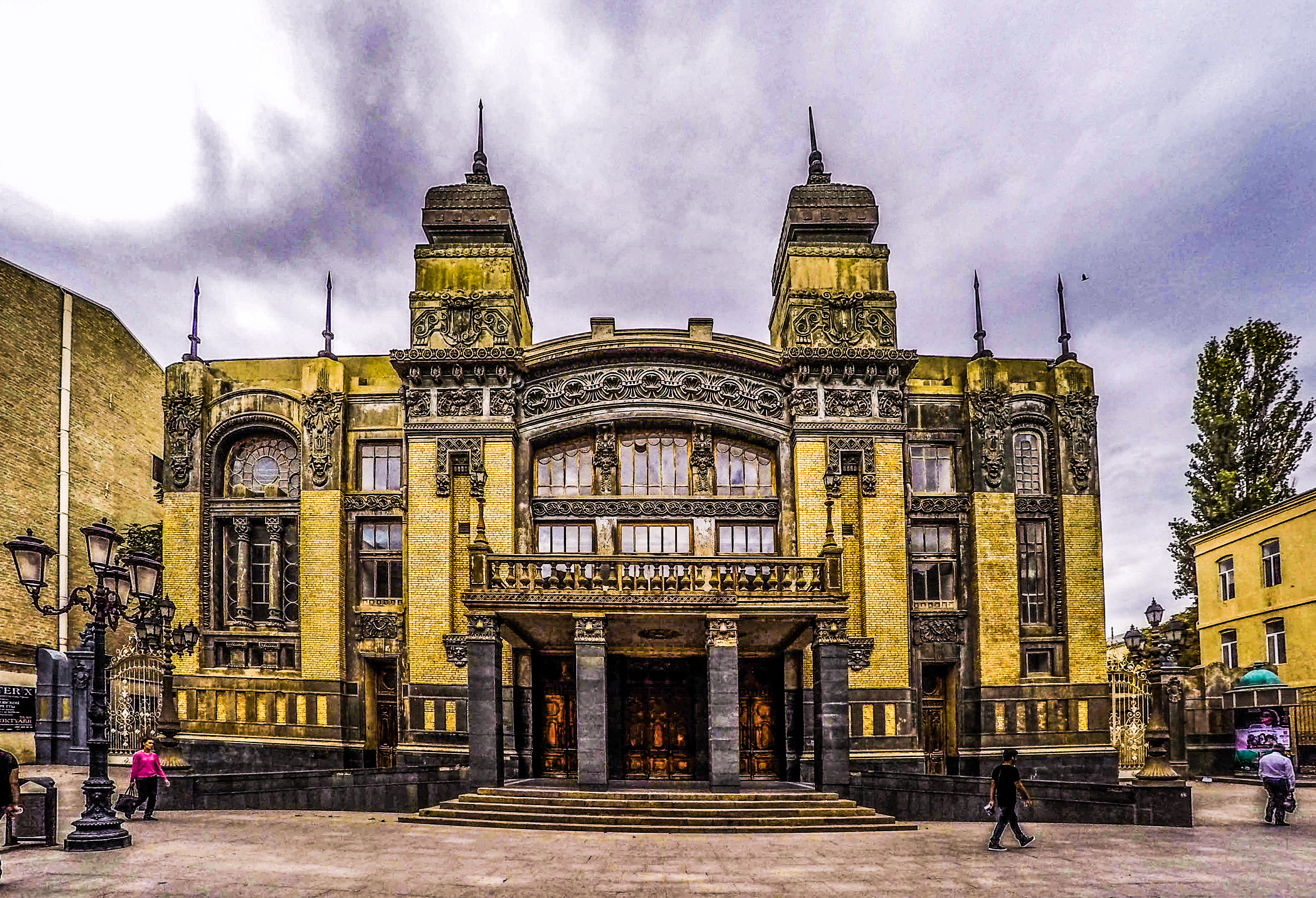
The premiere of the ballet was held at the Azerbaijan State Academic Opera and Ballet Theater.

In the first performance, the artists of Azerbaijan State Academic Opera and Ballet Theater Tamilla Shiraliyeva - Shahrizad, Rafael Grigoryan - Shahriyar, I. Nizamaddinova - Nurida, R. Arifulim and R. Zeynalov - Nurida's favorite slave, S. Bordanov - Spirit bird, A. Kurkov - Aladdin, F. Yusifova - Budur, S. Rahmatulin - the leader of 40 robbers, V. Andreyev - Alibaba, L. Povliy - Marjana, O. Vorgonov - performed as a witch. Gamar Almaszade says that "Each first performance, as well as the performance of a new original work, is an outstanding event not only for the authors and the theater, but also for the audience... Along with the achievements of all the participants of the performance, I want to note the high artistry of ballet master Naila Nazirova. From the point of view of professionalism, this ballet master matures from performance to performance and pleases us with his new successes. The ballet "Arabian Nights" is his creative victory. Ballet is a new high level in the development of Azerbaijani choreographic art. Organically connecting classical choreography with elements of folk dances, including Arab folk dances, N. Nazirova created a memorable and beautiful performance." Elbey Rzaguliyev, speaking about the artistic design of the stage during the first staging, says: "Every play prepared with the participation of Togrul Narimanbeyov is eagerly awaited, you believe that communication with a high art example will definitely bring you joy. The decorations prepared by the famous artist for the play "Arabian Nights" turned out much better than I expected. These decorations are a novelty in Soviet scenography, the next success of Azerbaijani theater-decoration art. As always, Narimanbeyov has created a beautiful, handsome color with great influence. His decorations fascinate people with the richness of their colors and interesting creative style. Based on the sketches of the young artist Tahir Tahirov, the costumes for the play were also made with great taste and skill."

R. Zohrabov notes that "...the ballet troupe of the Azerbaijan State Academic Opera and Ballet Theater showed its best qualities in this performance. In the choreography of the ballet, Shahriyar's courageous and temperamental character, Shahrizad and Shahriyar's love duet, Baghdad bazaar, Alibaba and forty robbers are noteworthy. The choreographic solution of the play's storyline is a great invention of the ballet master...N. One of Nazirova's wonderful findings is that she was able to organically combine classical ballet movements and national dance terms."

=== Other stagings ===
The ballet "Arabian Nights" was staged not only in Azerbaijan, but also in various countries, and was always well received. Thus, in 1981, the work was presented to the Moscow audience for three consecutive days. The success of the work was widely covered in the Moscow press.

In 1981, the Georgian premiere of the ballet took place at the Tbilisi Academic Opera and Ballet Theater. Z. Anjaparidze notes that "Z. The performance on the stage of Tbilisi Academic Opera and Ballet Theater named after Paliashvili was a remarkable event at the celebrations dedicated to the 60th anniversary of the founding of the Communist Party of the Republic... I don't remember another performance that excited our collective so much. All the days that the production team from Azerbaijan worked in the theater were quite intense. The collective of our theater worked very responsibly on the ballet. Light came day and night from the workshops, where costumes were made, decorations and clothing were made. The rich choreographic dance language of the ballet fascinated the Georgian audience. Classical heritage and national folklore are boldly synthesized in music, artistic design, and choreography. The Georgian artists who played the main roles were able to convey the intention of the play's authors through dance."

Composer F. Amirov, commenting on the performance of the ballet in Georgia, says, "I am happy that the ballet was a great success among the discerning Tbilisi audience. I would like to specially mention such a point that our Georgian colleagues...they solved the most serious problems encountered in the course of the work with their feet."

In 1982, the ballet was performed on the stage of the Novosibirsk Opera and Ballet Theater. The ballet was created jointly by art masters of the Russian Federation and Azerbaijan. Choreographer Naila Nazirova, artist Togrul Narimanbeyov and conductor Boris Gruzin, Honored Artist of Ukraine, have created a performance with philosophical depth and humanism. The costumes were made based on the sketches of the artist Tahir Tahirov. Conductor Boris Gruzin says that "the success of the ballet is connected with the beautiful music of Fikret Amirov", and ballerina Lyubov Kershinova, People's Artist of Russia, says that "I was lucky enough to be the first performer of the role of Shahrizad in the Novosibirsk theater. It is a very emotional image, although it is technically difficult. It was not easy to combine the specifics of classical ballet with elements of oriental dance folklore. However, working with the talented ballet master N. Nazirova, who has a high professional training, I deeply penetrated the image of my hero, mastered the dance technique", and Honored Artist of the RSFSR Anatoly Berdyshev says that "Everything in the Arabian Nights ballet: music too, decorations, costumes, of course, choreography is also beautiful. I play the central role of Shahriyar in the play. This image is very complex, unusual."

In 1982, the ballet "A Thousand and One Nights" was staged in Morocco and Bulgaria. In 1983, the ballet was staged at the Donetsk Opera and Ballet Theater in Ukraine. L. Minkin writes that "the ballet master succeeded in the appropriate choreographic interpretation of the music of V. Shumeik, Honored Artist of Tatarstan. In the work, the organic unity of three aspects - the plasticity of Eastern dances, classical elements and modern dance lexicon - made the ballet interesting in terms of choreography. This is clearly expressed, for example, in the sharp dances of the executioners, in the sword-like cut of crossed hands. Shahrizadeh's final part attracts attention with the successful fusion of the classical duet with a short steady, typical oriental pose. The image of Shahrizade, created by E. Rykova, wins the sympathy of the audience with its youthful charm and feminine beauty. This is the undoubted success of the young ballerina. Honored Artist of Ukraine A. Boyntsov warmly and convincingly portrayed Shahriyar's complex psychological image. This party requires the embodiment of various emotional and psychological states. Transition from a calm, happy state (lyrical duet with Nurida - soloist Y. Ogurtsova) to a shocking, hopeless, angry, merciless state, then the first daring attempts to test Shahrizad, and finally, adoration before her - all this was masterfully given psychologically by the artist. "

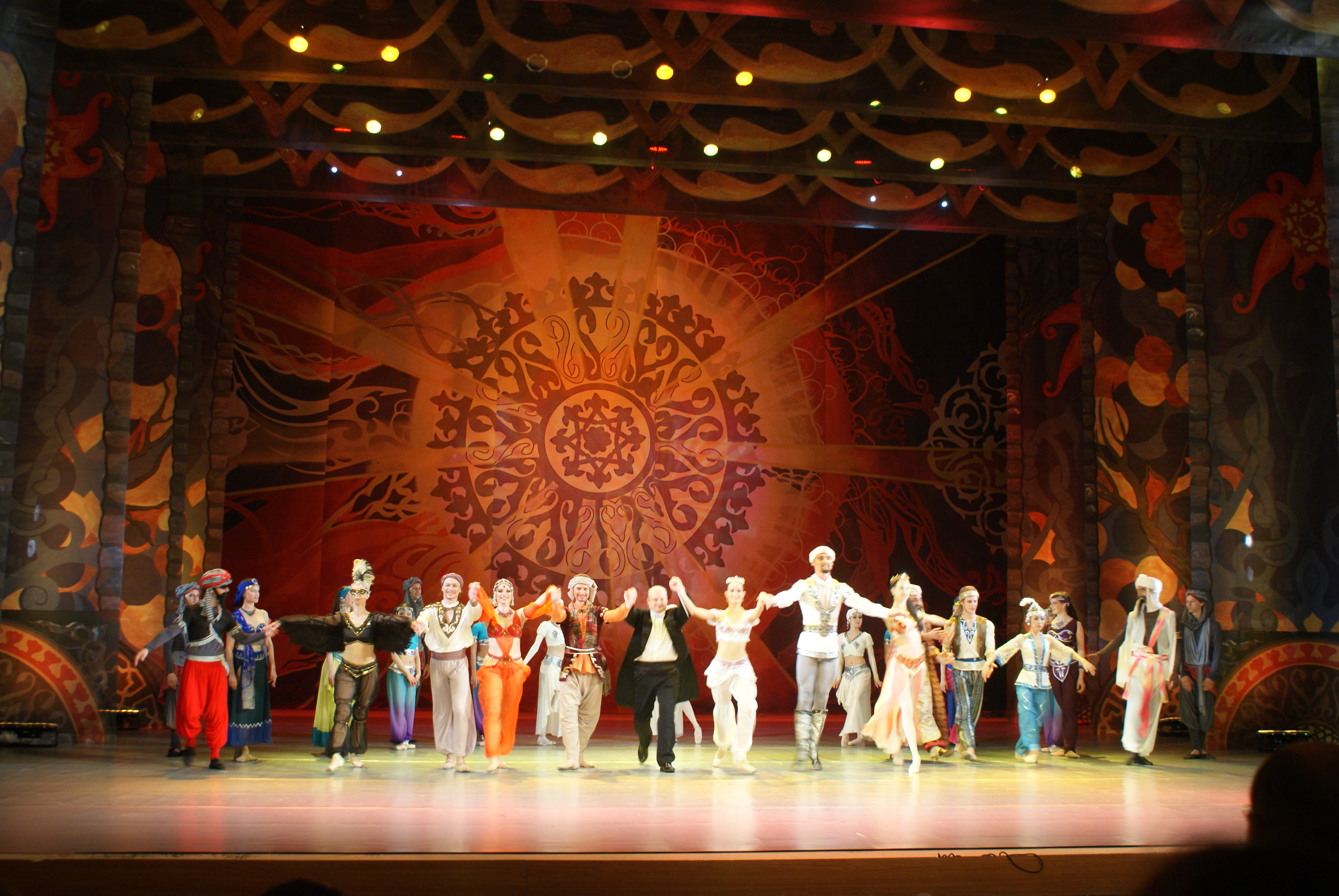
A performance at the Belarusian State Musical Theater on February 4, 2014

On October 15, 1983, the ballet "Arabian Nights" was performed by the Azerbaijan Academic Opera and Ballet Theater on the stage of the Moscow Kremlin.

In 1985, the ballet was staged for the first time in Turkey. Ballet master Naila Nazirova, artist Togrul Narimanbeyov, conductor Nazim Rzayev, and costume designer Tahir Tahirov were included in the creative team that prepared the ballet for performance in Turkey for three months by order of Istanbul State Opera and Ballet Theater. The main roles were played by Oskan Arslan (Shahriyar) and Deniz Olgay (Shahrizadeh).

On October 25, 2010, the ballet performed by the Kremlin Ballet Theater was presented to the audience on the stage of the Kremlin Palace. Tahir Salahov was the production designer of the work, and Olga Polyanskaya was the costume designer. The ballet performance was accompanied by the Sergei Rachmaninov Symphony Orchestra. The main roles of the play were played by Alexandra Timofeyeva in the character of Shahrizad, Mikhail Yevgenov in the character of Shahriyar, Aliya Khasenova in the character of Nurida and others.

On February 14, 2014, the Belarusian premiere of the ballet took place at the Belarusian State Musical Theater. The new mysterious choreography of the founding ballet master, People's Artist of Azerbaijan Madina Aliyeva, the brilliant performance of the symphonic orchestra led by Eyyub Guliyev, the laureate of international competitions, the conductor of the Azerbaijan State Academic Opera and Ballet Theater, the colorful scenery and costumes created by the designer-artist Inara Aslanova, embodying the spirit of the Eastern world, Belarus was received with great admiration by the audience. The chief ballet master of the theater, People's Artist of the Republic of Belarus Vladimir Ivanov, as well as assistants of the choreographer-ballet master, Honored Artists of Belarus Zhanna Lebedeva and Olga Serko, artist Lyubov Sidelnikova, music editor, Honored Artist of Azerbaijan Samir Samadov took part in the production of the performance. Soloists of the Belarusian State Musical Theater, Sergey Glukh (Shahriyar), Irina Voytekunas (Shahrizad), Polina Garunovich (Zibeida), Igor Goncharik (Sinbad the Sailor), Dmitry Lazovik (Aladdin), Mika Suzuki (Prince Budur), Vitaly Borovnev ( Jin), Mike Partush (Chief of Bandits), Aleksandra Krasnoglazova (Marjana) and Nikolai Umerenkov (Alibaba) performed.

== Acceptance ==
In 1980, composer F. Amirov, ballet master N. Nazirova, artist T. Narimanbeyov, conductor Nazim Rzayev and the performers of the main roles were awarded the USSR State Prize for the success of the "Arabian Nights" ballet in 1980.

The fate of the ballet "Arabian Nights" was very successful. Along with the composer, ballet master Naila Nazirova and artist Togrul Narimanbeyov also played a role in this success. After the performance of the ballet in the Kremlin Palace in Moscow, the People's Artist of the USSR R. Strushkova noted in an interview: "The choreography of the ballet carries a new idea and creates interesting opportunities in the field of both composition and unique plasticity."

S. Tahmiragizi says, "In this work, music, choreography, artistic arrangement and costume sketches complement each other. In short, the ballet "Arabian Nights", which consists of two acts and an introduction, expresses the struggle of good and evil and the victory of good with the close unity of art forms.

Musicologist Konstantin Sakva says, "I consider the music of the Thousand and One Nights ballet to be F. Amirov's great success. The composer avoids modern methods and demonstrates the beauty and emotional sincerity of the national melody. The impressive expression of the music is in harmony with the color of the tales.

Composer Rauf Hajiyev (the secretary of the Azerbaijan Composers' Union at that time) notes that, "Due to its artistic value, this work is a performance that goes beyond the national framework and is close and understandable to all peoples. This is primarily the service of Fikret Amirov, the author of the music. With this work, he introduced himself to the audience as a composer who sensitively feels the characteristics of the ballet genre. Continuing the traditions of M. Ravel, N. Rimsky-Korsakov, and A. Onneger, F. Amirov created such a beautiful work that helps us to travel again to the world of poetic fairy tales of the East and to understand that they have a deep human meaning. F. Amirov's music fascinates people with its major colors and skillful adaptation to instruments. Enriched with bright rhythms and melodies of Arabic music, there are many interesting finds in this music. Ballet marks the beginning of a new stage in the artist's creativity."

R. Zohrabov notes that "the authors of the libretto understood the genre well and managed to create an interesting, ideologically exhausted work. If the first part of the ballet is dedicated to different moods, the world of emotions, the second part embodies fairy tale scenes. In this event, before our eyes, fairy tale episodes with different plots alternate dynamically in colorful scenes. People's artist of the USSR, composer Fikret Amirov and ballet master Naila Nazirova managed to create a gallery of images and interesting scenes based on concise and expressive musical numbers."

== Videos ==
- Ballet Arabian Nights (One Thousand and One Nights) - the first part site YouTube
- Ballet Arabian Nights (One Thousand and One Nights) - the second part site YouTube
- Ballet Arabian Nights (One Thousand and One Nights) - the third part site YouTube

== Sources ==
- Nasirova, K. (2005), Балет "Тысяча и одна ночь" [Ballet "Thousand and One Nights"] (in Russian), Baku: Ф. Амирова
- Qasımova, Solmaz; Abdullayeva, Zemfira (2004), Fikrət Əmirov, Baku: Nağıl evi
- Vinogradov, V. (1983), Мир музыки Фикрета [Fikret's world of music] (in Russian), Baku: Язычы
