= Azerbaijan State Chamber Orchestra =

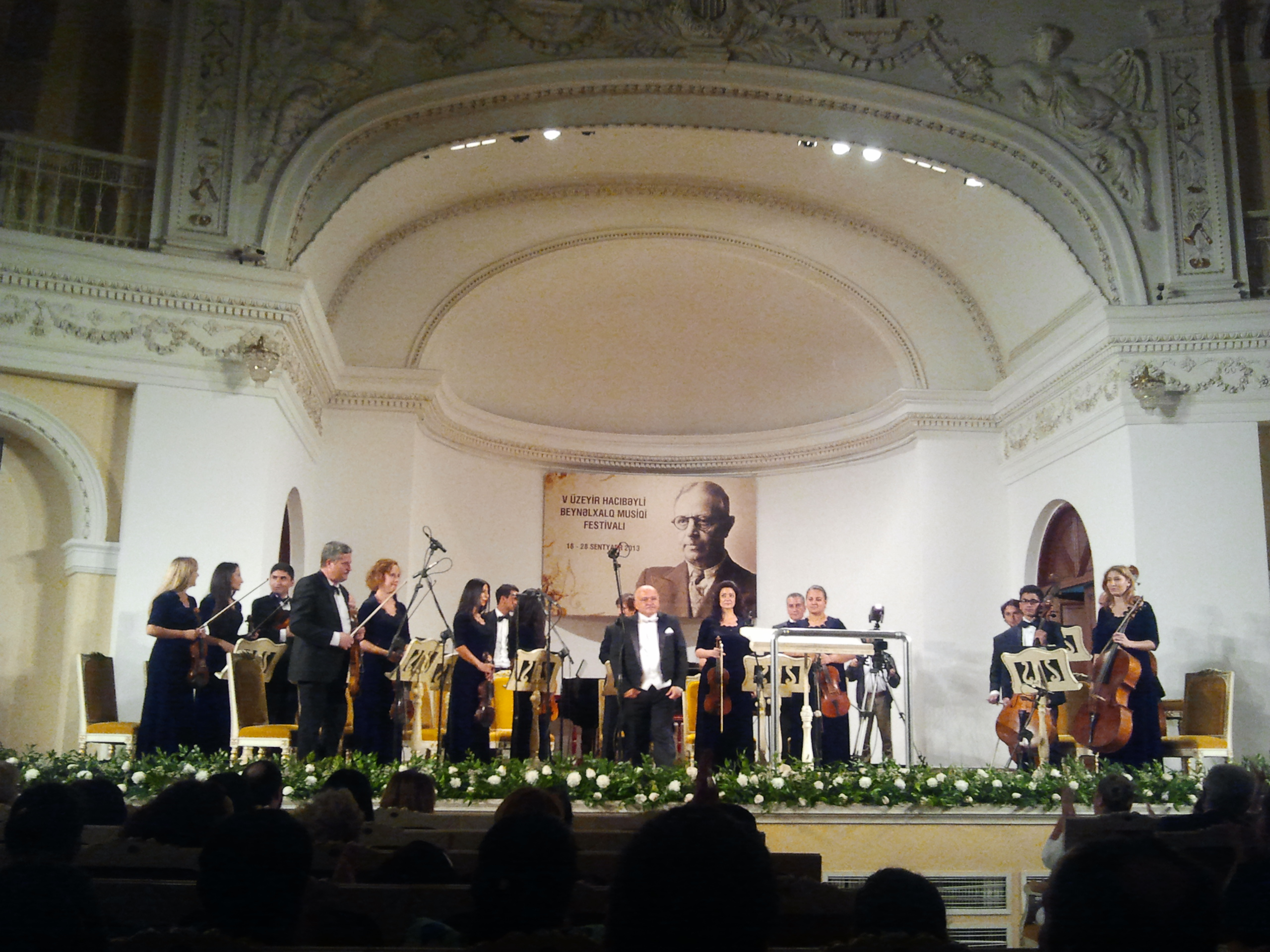
Azerbaijan State Chamber Orchestra performing at Uzeyir Hajibeyov International Music Festival (2013)

Azerbaijan State Chamber Orchestra named after Gara Garayev (Azerbaijani: Qara Qarayev adına Azərbaycan Dövlət Kamera Orkestri) is a chamber orchestra based in Baku, Azerbaijan. It was founded by Fikrat Amirov and Gara Garayev in 1964. The orchestra generally performs works of Azerbaijani composers and premiered works by Western European and Russian composers.

== History ==
The Azerbaijan State Chamber Orchestra (ASCO) was established on the initiative of Azerbaijani composers Fikrat Amirov and Gara Garayev in 1964. Nazim Rzayev directed the Orchestra until 1992 since its foundation. The orchestra toured different cities of Russia, as well as former Czechoslovakia, Poland, Tunis, Bosnia and Herzegovina, and Turkey during this period.

The Orchestra was headed by Ramiz Malikaslanov between 1992 and 1995. The Orchestra performed in Germany under his leadership. Ramiz Malikaslanov was succeeded by Yashar Imanov until 1997. The incumbent artistic director of the Azerbaijan State Chamber Orchestra is the People's Artist of the Republic of Azerbaijan Teymur Goychayev who was appointed to this post in 1998.

The ASCO was awarded with Humay National Award for promoting classical music in Azerbaijan in 2007.

== Concerts ==
The Orchestra performed at concerts during the Azerbaijani Culture Days conducted in Turkey (Ankara, İzmir), France (Strasbourg, Cannes, Paris), Germany (Munich, Dresden), Greece (Athens), Italy (Milan), Austria, Georgia, Japan, Egypt, South Korea and Switzerland.

The Orchestra performed in London in July and presented a jubilee concert dedicated to the 80th anniversary of the birth of Gara Garayev in September 1998 in Paris. The ASCO performed at the concerts dedicated to the 20th anniversary of the Independence of Azerbaijan organized in Berlin, Paris and Rome in 2011. The ASCO participated at the Azerbaijani Culture Days conducted in Beijing in May 2011, as well as at the 2nd Ramatuelle International Classical Music Festival organized in France in July 2011.

== List of Artistic Directors ==
Name	Period
Nazim Rzayev	1964–1992
Ramiz Malikaslanov	1992–1995
Yashar Imanov	1995–1997
Teymur Goychayev	1998–present

== See also ==
- Azerbaijan State Philharmonic Hall
- Azerbaijan State Orchestra of Folk Instruments
