= Ali Salimi =

Iranian Azerbaijani musician (1922–1997)

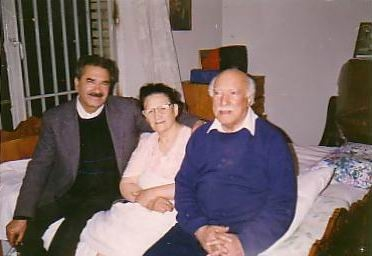
- From right to left: Ali Salimi and his wife Vartanush and Farhad Ebrahimi
- Born: 1922; Baku, Soviet Union
- Died: 22 April 1997; Tabriz, Iran

Ali Salimi (Persian: علی سليمی, Azerbaijani: Əli Səlimi; 1922 in Baku – 22 April 1997 in Tabriz) was an Iranian Azerbaijani musician, composer, and tar player. He had been based in Tehran for the last few decades of his life, where he made a significant contribution to the promotion and development of Azerbaijani music.

Many years before his birth, his father had migrated from the Mehmandost village of Ardabil city to Baku to earn a livelihood. Ali Salimi attended the classes of the Azerbaijani musician, Ahmad Bakikhanov and after a short while he showed such an aptitude for music that Ahmad Bakikhanov introduced him to the National Orchestra of Azerbaijan. In Stalin's time, because Ali Salimi's father did not want to change his nationality, he returned to Iran along with his family in 1938 (1317 Hijri), resided in his hometown, Ardabil, and obtained a birth certificate in his city.

In 1965 (1344 Hijri), when the singer of Baku Rashid Behbudov had come to Iran to have concerts, he was very impressed when he listened to the composition Ayriliq, and asked Ali Salimi for permission to play that composition in Baku.

Ali Salimi was invited to Tabriz in 1981 as the director of the East Azarbaijan Province TV Orchestra. He conducted the orchestra till his death in 1997, and in the meantime established a private music school in Iran for Azerbaijani music in 1984.

His statue is at the site of the cultural organisation UNESCO. Ali Salimi obtained degree 5 (the highest degree in the art of music) in composition from the Azerbaijan Republic, and he was the official member of the prominent composers of Baku.

He died at the age of 74 on 22 April 1997 from cerebral apoplexy.

== Compositions ==
- Gül Ardabil
- Ayriliq
- Size Salam Getirmishem
- Savalan
- Heidar Baba
- Ilgar
- Bahar galdi
- Aglama
- Gözüm ana
- Gül achdi
- Laleh
- Yasha mahabbat
- Ana laylasi
- Hagh yolu
- Gözal giz
- Sanin sözün
- Yalan donya
- Ay dolandi
- Party
- Domandi
- Ana vatan
- Bivafalar
- Könül
- Namaz
- Gülshan
- Aziz Iran
- Yagishlar
- Fuzuli üchün
- Azadligh ghoshalari
- Telli giz
- Birlik
- 'Babam üchün
- 'Azerbaijan (1)
- 'Azerbaijan (2)
- Vatanim
- Koroglu
- Ölkamiz
- Sözlar
- Sani isteyiram

== See also ==
- Music of Azerbaijan
