= Symphony No. 10 (Shostakovich) =

1953 symphony by Dmitri Shostakovich

- by Dmitri Shostakovich
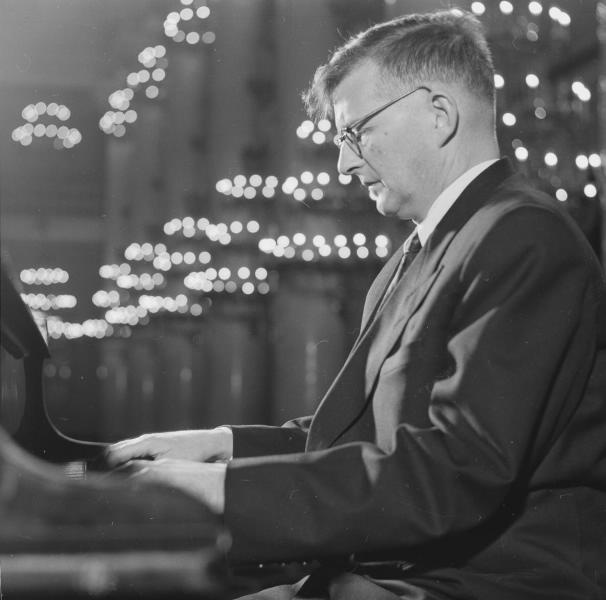
- Shostakovich performing on the piano in the 1950s
- Key: E minor
- Opus: 93
- Composed: 1946–1951/53
- Duration: 1 hour
- Movements: 4
- Scoring: Orchestra

Premiere
- Date: 17 December 1953
- Location: Leningrad
- Conductor: Yevgeny Mravinsky
- Performers: Leningrad Philharmonic Orchestra

The Symphony No. 10 in E minor, Op. 93, by Dmitri Shostakovich was premiered by the Leningrad Philharmonic Orchestra under Yevgeny Mravinsky on 17 December 1953. It is not clear when it was written. According to the composer, the symphony was composed between July and October 1953, but Tatiana Nikolayeva stated that it was completed in 1951. Sketches for some of the material date from 1946.

== Instrumentation ==
The symphony is scored for piccolo, two flutes (first flute with B foot extension, second flute doubling piccolo), three oboes (third doubling cor anglais), three clarinets (third doubling E♭ clarinet), three bassoons (third doubling contrabassoon), four horns, three trumpets, three trombones, tuba, timpani, bass drum, snare drum, triangle, cymbals, tambourine, tam-tam, xylophone, and strings.

== Composition ==
The symphony has four movements and a duration of approximately 50-60 minutes:

1. Moderato
2. Allegro
3. Allegretto – Largo –Più mosso
4. Andante – Allegro – L'istesso tempo

=== I. Moderato ===
The first and longest movement is a slow movement in rough sonata form. As in his Fifth Symphony, Shostakovich alludes to one of his settings of Pushkin: in the first movement, from the second of his Four Monologues on Verses by Pushkin, entitled "What Does My Name Mean to You?".

=== II. Allegro ===
The second movement is a short and loud scherzo with syncopated rhythms and semiquaver (sixteenth note) passages. The book Testimony said:

I did depict Stalin in my next symphony, the Tenth. I wrote it right after Stalin's death and no one has yet guessed what the symphony is about. It's about Stalin and the Stalin years. The second part, the scherzo, is a musical portrait of Stalin, roughly speaking. Of course, there are many other things in it, but that's the basis.

Shostakovich biographer Laurel Fay wrote, "I have found no corroboration that such a specific program was either intended or perceived at the time of composition and first performance." Musicologist Richard Taruskin called the proposition a "dubious revelation, which no one had previously suspected either in Russia or in the West". Elizabeth Wilson adds: "The Tenth Symphony is often read as the composer’s commentary on the recent Stalinist era. But as so often in Shostakovich’s art, the exposition of external events is counter-opposed to the private world of his innermost feelings."

=== III. Allegretto ===
The third movement is built around two musical codes: the DSCH theme representing Shostakovich, and the Elmira theme:

The notes spell out "E La Mi Re A" in a combination of French and German notation. This motif, called out twelve times on the horn, represents Elmira Nazirova, a composer with whom he had a life-long friendship. The motif is of ambiguous tonality, giving it an air of uncertainty or hollowness.

In a letter to Nazirova, Shostakovich himself noted the similarity of the motif to the ape call in the first movement of Mahler's Das Lied von der Erde, a work which he had been listening to around that time:

The same notes are used in both motifs, and both are repeatedly played by the horn. In the Chinese poem set by Mahler, the ape is a representation of death, while the Elmira motif itself occurs together with the "funeral knell" of a tam tam. Over the course of the movement, the DSCH and Elmira themes alternate and gradually draw closer.

=== IV. Andante, Allegro ===
In the fourth and final movement, a slow "Andante" introduction segues abruptly into an "Allegro" wherein the DSCH theme is employed again. The coda effects a transition to E Major and, at in the final measures, several instruments glissando from an E to the next E.

The DSCH-motif is anticipated throughout the first movement of the 10th Symphony: In the 7th bar of the start of the symphony the violins doubled by the violas play a D for 5 bars which is then directly followed by an E♭; 9 bars before rehearsal mark 29 the violins play the motif in an inverted order D-C-H-S (or D-C-B-E♭).
