= Uzeyir Hajibeyov International Music Festival =

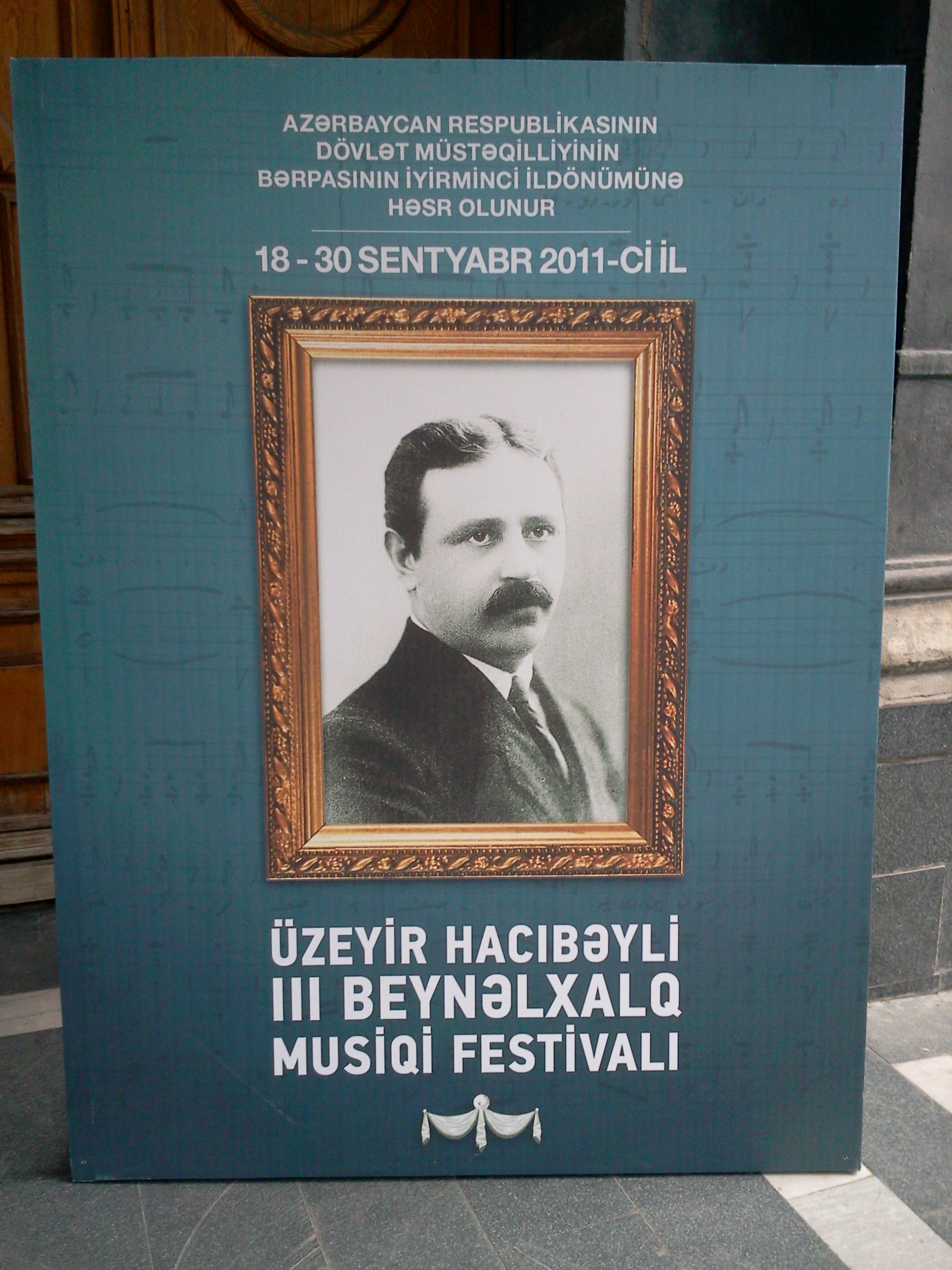
- Country: Azerbaijan
- Established: 2009

The Uzeyir Hajibeyov International Music Festival is held in September, since 2009, in Azerbaijan. Musical events are held in several cities of Azerbaijan, and the main ceremonies take place in Baku.

== History ==
Since 1995, September 18 (Uzeyir Hajibeyov's birthday) was celebrated as National Music Day in Azerbaijan. Beginning in 2009, it was decided to hold the International Music Festival devoted to well-known Azerbaijani composer Uzeyir Hajibeyov's creativity.

== Overview ==
The festival usually lasts 10 days. Events are conducted in different venues including National Art Museum of Azerbaijan, Azerbaijan State Philharmonic Hall, Azerbaijan Opera and Ballet Theatre, International Mugham Center, Azerbaijan State Academic Music Theatre, Baku Music Academy, Heydar Aliyev Palace in Baku, as well as in different regions of Azerbaijan.

Musicians from other countries participate at the festival side-by-side with Azerbaijani musicians. Performances made on the basis of Uzeyir Hajibeyov's compositions and scientific conferences called upon to learn Hajibeyov's creative heritage are organized besides concerts. The organizers of the festival are the Ministry of Culture and Tourism and the Heydar Aliyev Foundation.

== Timeline ==
Festival	Date	Year	Note
Uzeyir Hajibeyov 1st International Music Festival	September	2009	
Uzeyir Hajibeyov-125 International Music Festival	September 18-28	2010	
Uzeyir Hajibeyov 3rd International Music Festival	September 20-30	2011	
Uzeyir Hajibeyov 4th International Music Festival	September 19-29	2012	
Uzeyir Hajibeyov 5th International Music Festival	September 18-28	2013	
Uzeyir Hajibeyov 6th International Music Festival	September 18-28	2014	
Uzeyir Hajibeyov 7th International Music Festival	September 18-28	2015	
Uzeyir Hajibeyov 8th International Music Festival	September 18-27	2016	
Uzeyir Hajibeyov 9th International Music Festival	September 18-26	2017	
Uzeyir Hajibeyov 10th International Music Festival	September 18-26	2018	
Uzeyir Hajibeyov 11th International Music Festival	September 18-30	2019	
