= Şuşanın dağları başı dumanlı =

Azerbaijani folk song

Performing by Khan Shushinski

Şuşanın dağları başı dumanlı — Azerbaijani folk song about Shusha, where the town is compared to a beautiful girl. This song was written by famous Azerbaijani khanende (mugham-singer) Khan Shushinski, and after his death was folklorized. The song is performed with accompaniment of the Tar, Kamancha and Qaval.

Text in Azerbaijani

Şuşanın dağları başı dumanlı,
Qırmızı koftalı yaşıl tumanlı,
Dərdindən ölməyə çoxdu gümanım.

Ay qız, bu nə qaş göz, bu nə tel,
Ölərəm dərdindən, onu bil,
Danışmasan da balam, barı gül.

Şuşada axşamlar yanar ulduzlar,
Onlardan gözəldi gəlinlər, qızlar,
Oturub yol üstə yarını gözlər.

Ay qız, bu nə qaş göz, bu nə tel,
Ölərəm dərdindən, onu bil,
Danışmasan da balam, barı gül.

Şuşanın hər yandan gəlir sorağı,
Tərifə layiqdir İsa bulağı,
Dağları, bağları, qızlar oylağı.

Ay qız, bu nə qaş göz, bu nə tel,
Ölərəm dərdindən, onu bil,
Danışmasan da balam, barı gül.

== Sources ==
- Музыкалная академия, выпуск 1. "Композитор". 2002
- V. Muxtaroğlu. Xan Zirvəsi.
