= Ayrılıq =

Azerbaijani folk song

Ayrılıq (Azerbaijani: ayrılıq; South Azerbaijani: آیریلیق; lit. 'Separation') is an Azerbaijani folk song with lyrics by Farhad Ebrahimi and music composed by Ali Salimi in 1957. The song is about separation and love and is one of "the most familiar to Azerbaijanis throughout the world".

== Context ==
Composer and tar player Ali Salimi's family suffered the harsh policies of Soviet dictator Joseph Stalin and fled Soviet Azerbaijan for Ardabil in Iranian Azerbaijan to the south. He had been searching for lyrics on which to base a composition to express the motif of "separation", i.e. the "separation from family members, relatives and loved ones-separation from home town and home villages over on the other side of the Araz River". For Salimi, this was "a painful part of the lives of so many Azerbaijanis" because "neither, the Soviet regime nor Shah's regime allowed us to visit the other side. Going back was only a dream or, at best, a one-way ticket." He was given a poem by Farhad Ibrahimi and wrote a melody to accompany it.

== Versions ==
Ayrılıq was first recorded by Ali Salimi's wife Fatma Qennadi (under her artist name Vartush) for Radio Tehran, where they used to work. Later the famous Azerbaijani singer of Soviet Union, Rashid Behbudov, visited Tehran in 1963, where he learned about the song. R.Behbudov began performing the song himself in the Soviet Azerbaijan which made the song popular there. In later years, the song was repeatedly performed by other singers including famous Azerbaijani singers Lütfiyar İmanov, Flora Karimova, Iranian singers Googoosh, Yaqub Zurufçu, Dariush Eqbali, British musician and singer Sami Yusuf, Turkish singers Barış Manço, Zeki Müren, Emel Sayın, Mahsun Kırmızıgül, Fatih Kısaparmak and Selda Bagcan, Uzbek singer Nasiba Abdullaeva and many others. More recently, Iranian-American singer Mansour released a contemporary-styled version of the song mixed with "Küçələrə Su Səpmişəm", another Rashid Behbudov favourite

== Lyrics ==
Azerbaijani	English translation	South Azerbaijani
Fikrindən gecələr yata bilmirəm Bu fikri başımdan ata bilmirəm Neyləyim ki, sənə çata bilmirəm Ayrılıq, ayrılıq, aman ayrılıq Hər bir dərddən olar yaman ayrılıq Uzundur hicrindən, qara gecələr Bilmirəm, mən gedim, hara gecələr Vurubdur qəlbimə yara gecələr Ayrılıq, ayrılıq, aman ayrılıq Hər bir dərddən olar yaman ayrılıq. Yadıma düşəndə ala gözlərin Göydə ulduzlardan, allam xəbərin Neyləyim kəsibdir məndən nəzərin Ayrılıq, ayrılıq, aman ayrılıq Hər bir dərddən olar yaman ayrılıq Ayrılıq dərdini çəkməyən bilməz Yardan ayrı düşən göz yaşın silməz Deyərlər: İntizar xəstəsi ölməz Ayrılıq, ayrılıq, aman ayrılıq Hər bir dərddən olar yaman ayrılıq Necə ki, əlimdən, ayrı düşəndən Sorar bir-birini, görüb biləndən Həsrətlə sızlayar daim bu qəmdən Ayrılıq, ayrılıq, aman ayrılıq Hər bir dərddən olar yaman ayrılıq İllərdir uzağam, arxam elimdən Bülbüləm, düşmüşəm, ayrı gülümdən Zor ilə ayırıb şirin dilimdən Ayrılıq, ayrılıq, aman ayrılıq Hər bir dərddən olar yaman ayrılıq Olubdur biganə, yarım-yoldaşım Qəribə sayılır sevgim, sırdaşım Bu cavan çağımda ağardıb başım Ayrılıq, ayrılıq, aman ayrılıq Hər bir dərddən olar yaman ayrılıq Məni ağladandan gülüş istərəm Uzaq düşənimlə görüş istərəm Hasarı yıxmağa yürüş istərəm Ayrılıq, ayrılıq, aman ayrılıq Hər bir dərddən olar yaman ayrılıq Sevgilik olubdur şəni Fərhadın; Sevgisi hardadır, hanı Fərhadın; Deyərək, çıxacaq canı Fərhadın; Ayrılıq, ayrılıq, aman ayrılıq Hər bir dərddən olar yaman ayrılıq	Your memory keeps me up in sleepless nights. I can't release this thought from my head, For whatever I do, I cannot reach you. Separation, separation, oh separation! Most painful injury of all, bitter separation. In your absence, these dark nights stretch to eternity, I don't know where I'd go in these nights. Nights which struck wounds into my heart! Separation, separation, oh separation! Most painful injury of all, bitter separation. When I remember your colourful eyes From the stars in the skies I ask about them What should I do now that she has turned her gaze away from me Separation, separation, oh separation! Most painful injury of all, bitter separation. He who does not suffer the pain of separation cannot understand Tears of the eye separated from his beloved cannot be wiped away They say that the patient of waiting does not die Separation, separation, oh separation! Most painful injury of all, bitter separation. How when I am far from my family and people I ask about each and every single one of them My beloved constantly weeps from the longing of this sorrow Separation, separation, oh separation! Most painful injury of all, bitter separation. For years I have been far from my family and people I am the nightingale far from my flower With anguish I have been separated from my sweet tongue Separation, separation, oh separation! Most painful injury of all, bitter separation. My love and friend has turned foreign My love and confidant has turned to strange ways Since youth my hair has turned white Separation, separation, oh separation! Most painful injury of all, bitter separation. I want laughter from the one who makes me cry I want a meeting with the one I was separated from I want a march to tear down the fence Separation, separation, oh separation! Most painful injury of all, bitter separation. He has fallen in a love comparable to that of Farhad's; Where is Farhad's beloved In saying it, Farhad is pained Separation, separation, oh separation! Most painful injury of all, bitter separation.	فیکریندن گئجه‌لر یاتا بیلمیرم بو فیکری باشیمدان آتا بیلمیرم نئینییم کی سنه چاتا بیلمیرم آیریلیق، آیریلیق، آمان آیریلیق هر بیر درددن اولار یامان آیریلیق اوزوندور هیجرین‌دن قارا گئجه‌لر بیلمیرم من گئدیم هارا گئجه‌لر ووروبدور قلبیمه یارا گئجه‌لر آیریلیق، آیریلیق، آمان آیریلیق هر بیر درددن اولار یامان آیریلیق یادیما دوشنده آلا گوزلرین گویده اولدوزلاردان آلام خبرین نئیله‌ییم کسیبدیر مندن نظرین آیریلیق، آیریلیق، آمان آیریلیق هر بیر درددن اولار یامان آیریلیق آیریلیق دردینی چکمه‌ین بیلمز یاردان آیری دوشن گوز یاشین سیلمز دئییرلر اینتظار خسته‌سی اؤلمز آیریلیق، آیریلیق، آمان آیریلیق هر بیر درددن اولار یامان آیریلیق نئجه کی ائلیمدن آیری دوشندن سورار بیربیرینی گوروب بیلندن حسرتله سیزلار یار داییم بو غمدن آیریلیق، آیریلیق، آمان آیریلیق هر بیر درددن اولار یامان آیریلیق ایللردی اوزاغام آرخام ائلیم‌دن بلبلم دوشموشم آیری گولوم‌دن جورایله آییریب شیرین دیلیم‌دن آیریلیق، آیریلیق، آمان آیریلیق هر بیر درددن اولار یامان آیریلیق اولوبدور بیگانه یاریم_ یولداشیم غریبه ساییلیر سئوگیم – سیرداشیم بو جاوان چاغیمدا آغاردیب باشیم آیریلیق، آیریلیق، آمان آیریلیق هر بیر درددن اولار یامان آیریلیق منی آغلاداندان گولوش ایسته‌رم آیری دوشنیمله گوروش ایسته‌رم حصاری ییخماغا یوروش ایسته‌رم آیریلیق، آیریلیق، آمان آیریلیق هر بیر درددن اولار یامان آیریلیق سئوگیلیک اولوبدور شانی فرهادین سئوگی‌سی هاردادیر، هانی فرهادین دییه‌ره‌ک چیخاجاق جانی فرهادین آیریلیق، آیریلیق، آمان آیریلیق هر بیر درد دن اولار یامان آیریلیق
