= Teymur Goychayev =

Azerbaijani conductor and composer

Teymur Goychayev Teymur Göyçayev
- Born: August 11, 1958 (age 67)
- Occupations: conductor, composer
- Awards

Teymur Anvar oghlu Goychayev (Azerbaijani: Teymur Ənvər oğlu Göyçayev, born August 11, 1958) is an Azerbaijani conductor and composer, People's Artiste of Azerbaijan (2005), Director of the Bulbul Secondary Specialized Music School.

== Biography ==
Teymur Goychayev completed his education at the Baku Music Academy, graduating from the distinguished instrument faculty with a specialization in the violin with honors in 1981. In 1985, he participated in a music competition for musicians in the Transcaucasus and won a special award.

He began teaching at the Bulbul Secondary Specialized Music School in 1986 and later at the Baku Music Academy, where he still teaches today. He also contributed to the Uzeyir Hajibeyli Azerbaijan State Symphony Orchestra. Since 1998, Teymur Göyçayev has been the artistic director of the State Chamber Orchestra named after Gara Garayev.

== Awards ==
- People's Artiste of Azerbaijan — September 16, 2005
- Honored Art Worker of Azerbaijan — October 28, 2000
- Shohrat Order — August 10, 2018
- Gizil Chinar — May 10, 2014
