= Elmira Nazirova =

Azerbaijani composer (1928–2014)

- Elmira Mirzərza qızı Nəzirova
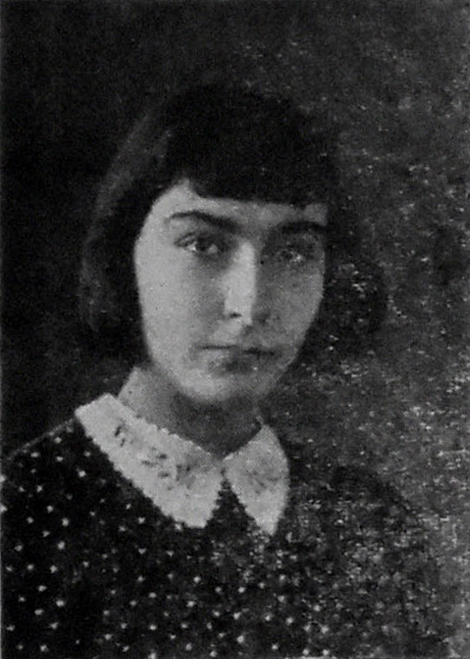
- Nazirova in 1945
- Born: 30 November 1928; Baku, Azerbaijan
- Died: 23 January 2014 (aged 85); Israel
- Education: Azerbaijan State Conservatory; Moscow Conservatory
- Occupation: Composer
- Employer: Azerbaijan State Conservatory
- Organizations: Composers Union of Azerbaijan; Union of Russian Composers
- Notable work: Tenth Symphony; Piano Concerto on an Arabic Theme
- Spouse: Miron Fel (m. 1948)
- Children: 2
- Awards: Sharaf Order

Elmira Mirza Rza-kyzy Nazirova (Azerbaijani: Elmira Mirzərza qızı Nəzirova; 30 November 1928 – 23 January 2014) was an Azerbaijani composer. Born to a Georgian Jewish family, she was a child prodigy who excelled at music and trained at the Azerbaijan State Conservatory for several years. At 14, she became one of the youngest members of the Composers Union of Azerbaijan. Nazirova performed abroad, where her talent was recognised by prominent musicians, and she pursued an education at the Moscow Conservatory. Through her education there, she met and became lifelong friends with Soviet composer Dmitri Shostakovich, having significant impact on his work, particularly his Tenth Symphony.

Nazirova is regarded as one of the best Azerbaijani and one of the first female composers in Azerbaijan. She taught at the Azerbaijan State Conservatory for decades, with pupils including Aida Huseynova. In 1990, she moved to Israel, where she died in 2014.

== Biography ==
Born in Baku, Azerbaijan, on 30 November 1928, to a Georgian Jewish family, Nazirova joined the Baku Academy of Music, where she was identified as a child prodigy and placed in a special program for gifted students alongside Chingiz Sadykhov and Bella Davidovich. At age 14, she became one of the youngest members of the Composers Union of Azerbaijan. Two years later, her Piano Preludes were performed at the "Decade of Music of the Transcaucasian Republics" in Tbilisi, Georgia, where her talent was noted by prominent musicians such as Reinhold Gliere. With the encouragement of Uzeyir Hajibeyov, she continued her education at the Moscow Conservatory, studying piano with Yakov Zak and composition with Dmitri Shostakovich. Nazirova developed a close, lifelong friendship with Shostakovich, and a series of letters from Shostakovich to Nazirova, published after she emigrated to Israel, have been studied as evidence of her impact on his work, including the Tenth Symphony. There were rumours that they were romantically involved, but Nazirova denied it.

In 1948, Nazirova married Miron Fel, a student at Azerbaijan Medical University. She then returned to Baku, where she resumed her studies at the Azerbaijan State Conservatory under Georgi Şaroyev, graduating in 1950. In 1954 she graduated from the composition program led by Boris Zeydman. She joined the conservatory faculty as a piano instructor in 1951, and by 1953 she had been accepted into the Union of Russian Composers. For her contributions to Azerbaijani music, she was awarded the Sharaf Order. By the 1950s, she toured widely, performing in Russia, Georgia, Poland, Czechoslovakia, Egypt, and Iraq. In 1971, she became a professor at the conservatory.

Her legacy includes an overture for symphony orchestra, three piano concertos, and adaptations of Azerbaijani folk melodies and romances. A highlight of her career is the Piano Concerto on an Arabic Theme, co-composed with Fikret Amirov. Nazirova taught at the conservatory for decades and continued to teach after emigrating to Israel with her husband and two children in 1990. In 2004, her 75th birthday was honoured with a commemorative event at the Azerbaijan State Academic Philharmonic Hall. She was a highly respected pianist and composer in Azerbaijan, and one of the first women to pursue the profession and achieve success. She influenced several Azerbaijani musicians, including Aida Huseynova. She died on 23 January 2014 in Israel.
