= No Moles Left in Irevan =

"İrəvanda xal qalmadı"

Song
- Language: Azerbaijani
- English title: No moles left in Irevan
- Written: Jabbar Garyaghdioglu
- Published: 1939
- Songwriter: See text

"No moles left in Irevan" (Azerbaijani: İrəvanda xal qalmadı) is an Azerbaijani folk song. The words and the music of this song were written by Azerbaijani mugham singer Jabbar Garyaghdioglu spontaneously in one of the weddings of Erivan. After Garyaghdioglu, whose recordings no longer exist, the song was sung by Khan Shushinski.

The first duet who performed this song were Baba Mahmudoglu and Elmira Mammadova.

== History of the song ==
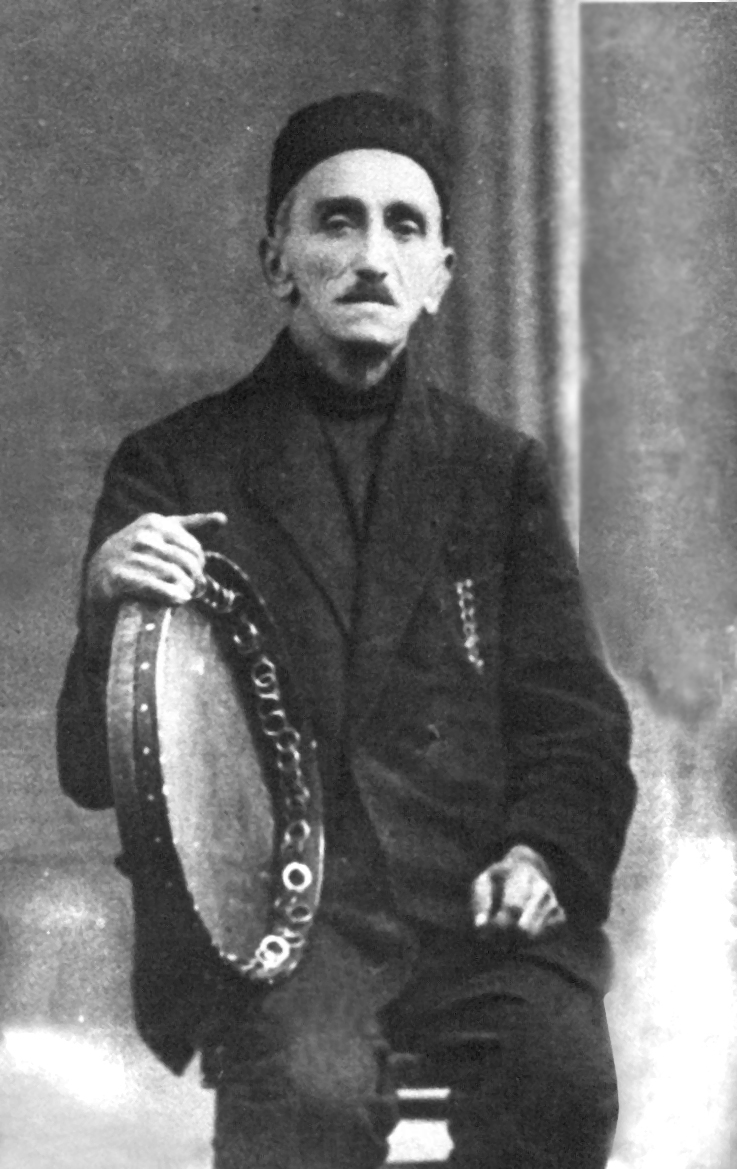
Jabbar Garyaghdioglu, author of both the words and the music of the song

The author of both the words and the music of the song is the well-known performer of mugham khanende Jabbar Karyagdyoglu. The history of the creation of the song is as follows: Jabbar Garyaghdioglu led the wedding of a rich man in Erivan. During the praises to the groom, the father of the bride half-jokingly asked why the bride was not praised either. In order not to offend the father of the bride, Garyaghdioglu asked him to tell him some information about the bride (at that time, the bride was not shown to the guests). He was told that the bride had a couple of moles on her face. Then Jabbar Garyaghdioglu immediately composing the words of the song, connected them with music by singing it. Thus, this song was randomly created.

After Jabbar Garyaghdioglu the other mugham masters sang this song with pleasure. Over time, the song became known not by the name of its author, but as a folk song. For many years, the song was presented to the public as a folk song. Soon, however, the song began to be performed on radio and television with the mention of the true author.

== Translations and editions ==
In 1939, the song was published in Turkish in Istanbul in the collection "Azerbaijani Folk Songs and Mani" (Turkish: Azerbaijan halk şarkı ve manileri) (Tecelli Basımevi publishing house). The compiler of the collection was an employee of the 3rd Ganja Infantry Regiment of the National Army of Azerbaijan Ali Volkan.

In 1956, the text of the song, along with notes and the translation of Joseph Oratovsky into Russian, was published in Baku in the collection "Azerbaijani Folk Songs". The recording of the notes was made by Said Rustamov from the tunes of Jabbar Garyaghdioglu and the amateur singer and collector of folk songs Agalar Aliverdybekov (in 1981 the collection was reissued).

In 1960 the song was translated to Russian by Konstantin Simonov and published in an anthology of Azerbaijani poetry in Moscow. This translation was published in Leningrad in 1978. Simonov translated only five stanzas, while several more stanzas of this song are known in the Azerbaijani version.

== Structure of the song ==
Joyful feelings prevail in this song. The lyrical hero of the song admires the beauty of his beloved. He has a cheerful mood. He rejoices in life and greets the morning dawn with a song. The main character can talk about sadness and separation, but in general he is carefree, even playful and believes in good luck and joy.

In the original, each stanza consists of seven poetic lines. The first three are eight syllables. These lines, in which the hero, as it were, gives out “information” - describes the heroine, rhyme with each other. The fourth and fifth lines are an appeal to the heroine with a question. The sixth and seventh lines are a variant of the question-appeal. In the Russian translation, Simonov omitted two lines repeating the question.

== Lyrics ==
Azerbaijani	Russian translation (by Joseph Oratovsky)	Russian translation (by Konstantin Simonov)
İrəvanda xal qalmadı, O xal nə xaldır, üzə düzdürmüsən? De görüm nə xaldır qoşa düzdürmüsən? Daha məndə can qalmadı. O xal nə xaldır, üzə düzdürmüsən? De görüm nə xaldır qoşa düzdürmüsən? Xal mənim, Yar mənim. İxtiyar mənim. Xalqa nə borcdur üzə düzdürmüşəm?! Yarım deyibdir qoşa düzdürmüşəm.	— Ереван из-за тебя с ума сошёл, Что за родинки на щеках навела? Всё сердце мужчин в Шеки сгорят дотла, — Что за родинки в щеках навела? Ты скажи, как навести ты их смогла? — Эти родинки мои — мои дела, Что за дела вам, что я их навела? Милый скажет — наведу их без числа…	В Ереване нету ханов, В Шеки больше нет султанов, Больше я теперь не стану. Что за родинки, девица, На лице твоём сидят?

== In culture ==
In 1984, the Azerbaijani writer Hidayat Orujov wrote the play of the same name "İrəvanda xal qalmadı". It was published in the collection "Erivan Song" (Yerevan, 1984). In 2007, the play was staged on the stage of the Azerbaijan State Academic National Drama Theatre by the People's Artist of Azerbaijan Agakishi Kazimov.
