= Fikret Amirov =

Azerbaijani composer (1922–1984)

- Fikrət Əmirov
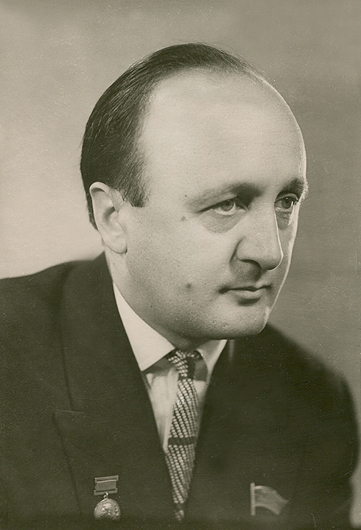
- Amirov in 1961
- Born: November 22, 1922; Ganja, Azerbaijani SSR, Soviet Union
- Died: February 20, 1984 (aged 61); Baku, Azerbaijani SSR, Soviet Union
- Occupation: Composer
- Awards: Stalin Prize (1949), People's Artiste of the Azerbaijan SSR (1958), USSR State Prize (1980), People's Artist of the USSR (1965), State Prize of Azerbaijan SSR (1974)

Fikret Mashadi Jamil oghlu Amirov (Note: Azerbaijani: Fikrət Məşədi Cəmil oğlu Əmirov; Russian: Фикрет Мешади Джамиль оглы Амиров, romanized: Fikret Meshadi Dzhamil ogly Amirov) (November 22, 1922 – February 20, 1984) was a prominent Soviet and Azerbaijani composer.

== Biography ==
=== Early life and education ===
Originally from Shusha, Fikret Amirov was born on November 22, 1922, in the family of Mashadi Jamil Amirov and Mrs. Durdane, in the city of Ganja. Fikrat was the second child of the family. Since childhood, Fikret listened to his singer and tarzən father's works, especially his music. His formation as a composer was influenced by the artists that live at that time. Fikret Amirov notes in his memoirs that "Azerbaijani tar made me a composer." He adds "The eye of the Azerbaijani musical instruments is tar. Tar is not only an instrument for its harmony, timbre, diapason, strength, as though it replaces the orchestra".

After his father died in 1928, 6 year old Fikrat had to take responsibility for the household. Despite the difficulties, he tried to continue his father's musical path. He was training with his elder sister Yaxshi. The songs performed by his sister were accompanied by Fikret on tar. Thus, they became successful in their school.

During his childhood and early adolescence, Fikret began composing pieces for the piano. Upon his graduation from the Ganja Music College, Amirov entered the Azerbaijan State Conservatoire, now known as the Baku Music Academy, where he was a student of Boris Zeidman and Uzeyir Hajibeyov.

In 1941, when Nazi Germany attacked the USSR, Amirov, 19 at the time, was drafted into the Soviet army. He was wounded near Voronezh, hospitalized and demobilized from the military service, returning to Baku to continue his studies at the Azerbaijan State Conservatoire.

Amirov's music was strongly influenced by Azeri folk melodies. He created a new genre called symphonic mugam. Amirov's symphonic mugams were based on classical folk pieces and were performed by many renowned symphony orchestras throughout the world, such as the Houston Symphony Orchestra conducted by Leopold Stokowski.

Amirov was a prolific composer. His most famous pieces include symphonic works such as "Shur" (1946), Kurd Ovshari (1949), "Azerbaijan Capriccio" (1961), "Gulustan Bayati-Shiraz" (1968), "The Legend of Nasimi" (1977), "To the Memory of the Heroes of the Great National War" (1944), "Double Concerto for Violin, Piano and Orchestra" (1948) etc.

His ballets include "Nizami" (1947) and Arabian Nights, which premiered in 1979. Amirov wrote the opera "Sevil" in 1953.

He also wrote a number of pieces for the piano including "Ballad," "Ashug's Song," "Nocturne," "Humoreska," "Lyrical Dance," "Waltz," "Lullaby" and "Toccata." He also wrote numerous film scores.

Michelle Kwan, World Champion Ice Skater from the U. S. used Fikret Amirov's symphonic piece "Gulustan Bayati-Shiraz" in her skating program "Taj Mahal" in 1996.

== Life and career ==
Fikret Amirov was born on November 22, 1922, in the family of Mashadi Jamil Amirov and Dyurdana khanim, Ganja city. He was the second child of the family. Fikret Amirov first started to play tar and accompany his sister, Yakhshi Khanim. Soon, with their performances, Fikret and his sister became successful in their school and attended the “Children's Creative Olympics” took place in Ganja. During the event, he played tar to accompany his sister.

Uzeyir Hajibeyov, who came to Ganja to choose talented performers gets acquainted with the talent. Fikret and his sister held the first place in the contest that took place in Ganja, and then in Baku. Shortly after, they move to Baku and Fikret entered Azerbaijan State Conservatoire (currently, Baku Music Academy). During their college years, they also performed at concerts with performances. Due to his success and talent, Fikret was taken to Baku after graduating from secondary school in 1939, Ganja. Here, he went to the conservatory with the advice of Dyrdana khanum (his mother). Young Fikret came to Baku to meet Bulbul and Bulbul introduced him to Uzeyir Hajibeyli here. Uzeyir discovered his talent and advised him to study in the conservatory.

Fikret Amirov resided at his relatives' home for the first time he visited Baku. Then with his violinist friend, they moved to a house in Dmitrov Street. After military service, he studied the subject "Basics of Azerbaijani Folk Music" in Uzeyir Hajibeyli's class and started to compose his first works in this style.

Since 1930, the Folk Music Cabinet was organized in the conservatory in order to collect the folk songs and dances under the guidance of Uzeyir Hajibeyli and Bulbul. Bulbul, who led the cabinet, recruited young composers and musicians. They went on expeditions to various parts of the country, collected folklore samples and provided folk songs and dance music with musical notes including Jabbar Qaryagdioglu, Seyid Shushinski, Khan Shushinski, and others’ works. Fikret Amirov was also attended in this project along with Asaf Zeynally, Zakir Bagirov, Gara Garayev, Suleyman Alasgarov, Said Rustamov, Ashraf Abbasov, Midhat Ahmadov, Mammadsaleh Ismayilov.

In 1940, frequent musical nights and concerts were held in the Azerbaijan State Philharmonic Hall. Fikret Amirov took part in these concerts and became more familiar with the works of Western and Russian composers, and used their musical language. He also attended in the symphonic orchestra exercises. During those years, Uzeyir Hajibeyov was the main person who encouraged Fikret Amirov as a composer. Boris Zeidman also played a key role in the composer's career.

I.G. Plyam who Fikrat's piano teacher wrote: I could hear how hard he worked every day. For hours and hours, he would go over each nuance elaborating each phrase. Students try to imitate others until they define their own way. Maybe that's only natural. But right from the start, Fikrat's work was original."

Amirov was involved with numerous responsibilities related to music. He directed the Azerbaijan Opera and Ballet Theater (1956-59), presided over the Azerbaijan Composers' Union in the 1960s and headed the Soviet Composers' Union during the 1970s. The wide artistic interest of Amirov included operas, ballets, symphonies, symphonic poems, symphonic mugham, suites, capriccio, piano concertos, sonatas, musical comedies, songs, love songs, piano pieces, music for dramatic productions, and movies. Amirov created the first Azerbaijani lyrical-psychological opera on a contemporary theme. Moreover, he is the author of the first instrumental concert and a fairytale ballet in Azerbaijan. The most outstanding works that made the musician well-known around the world are opera ‘Sevil’ as well as ballet ‘One Thousand and One Night’ created on the basis of oriental tales.

== Participation in war ==
November 27, 1941, 19-year-old Fikrat Amirov was called up for conscription into Soviet army. He was enrolled in Tbilisi for 3 months to study at the communications courses. After finishing the course, he was sent to the Voronezh front on June 3, 1942. During those years, he also led an ensemble, and also learned to play in the mandolin, which is a Russian instrument. Fikrat Amirov got an early discharge from the military November 1942 due to the illness. He first came to Ganja and stayed here for about a year and continued his works. He worked in Ganja State Philharmonic and led the music school and together with Mehdi Mammadov, the main director at the Drama Theater. The composer's symphonic poem "The Memory of Heroes of the Great Patriotic War", written in 1943, also reflects his frontier impressions.

== Style ==
His pieces was built on folk traditions of Azerbaijan and Middle East. However, the folkloric elements can be identified in them whether they are Azerbaijani or Arabic, as in the case of his ballet “Arabian Nights,” his “Concerto on an Arabian Theme for the Piano and Orchestra” (together with Elmira Nazirova) and “The Song of the Blind Arab”. As the composer used to do a lot of research before starting his pieces, strong folkloric elements can be observed in his compositions. For example, prior to composing his ballet "Arabian Nights," he visited several Arabic countries-Iraq, Yemen and Egypt-and brought back tapes and records. His orchestral suites, based on the style of Azerbaijan Mugams often contain melodies that are reminiscent of Rimsky-Korsakov, Khachaturian and Turkish music. One of his early success outside the USSR was Kurd Ovshari suite conducted by Leopold Stokowski.

== Compositions ==
Fikret Amirov composed the number of works including:

- Arabian Nights
- Ashug's Song, for piano
- Azerbaijan Capriccio
- Azerbaijan Mugam for orchestra
- Azerbaijan Mugam for orchestra No. 1, "Shur"
- Azerbaijan Mugam for orchestra No. 2, "Kürd Ovshari"
- Azerbaijan-Symphonic Suite, for orchestra
- Ballad for piano
- Berceuse
- Gülistan Bayaty Shiraz, symphonic mugam
- Gyulistan Bayati Shiraz, for orchestra
- Humoreska, for piano
- Kor Arab
- Kürd Ovshari, symphonic mugam Kurd Ovshari-Azerbaijan Mugam No. 2
- Lullaby, for piano
- Lyrical Dance, for piano
- Miniatures (12), for piano
- Nizami, for chamber orchestra
- Nocturne for flute & piano
- Nocturne for piano
- Piano Concerto after Arabian Themes
- Pieces (6) for flute & piano
- Seni Araram, for piano
- Sevil, opera
- Shur-Azerbaijan Mugam No. 1
- Song of the Ashug
- Symphonic Dances, for orchestra
- Symphony for string orchestra
- Tale of Nasimi
- Toccata for piano
- Waltz for piano

== Commemoration ==
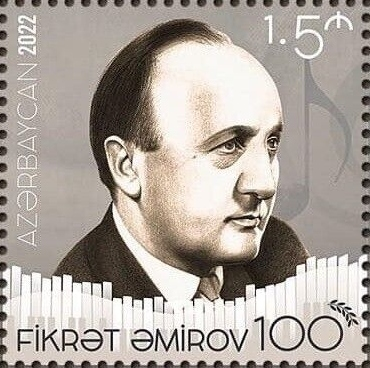
Amirov on a 2022 stamp of Azerbaijan

On January 13, 2017 Azerbaijan's Consulate General in Los Angeles hosted an event dedicated to famous Azerbaijani composer Fikret Amirov (1922–84). Members of the “Save a Heart” Foundation of the world-renowned Cedars-Sinai Medical Center of Los Angeles attended in the event. The composer's work “1001 Nights” ballet was screened during the event.

On November 25, 2014 another event took place at Baku Heydar Aliyev Center in Baku to mark Fikret Amirov's memory. During the event the book named ‘Fikret Amirov’ was introduced which was written based on the private archive of the composer. The program of event was consisted of works of Fikret Amirov performed by the Azerbaijan State Chamber Orchestra named after Gara Garayev. The orchestra will be conducted by the artistic director, chief conductor, People's Artiste of Azerbaijan, Teymur Goychayev.

In Baku at the Alley of Honor an event took place on November 22, 2014. The event was dedicated to the 93rd anniversary of the birth of the outstanding Azerbaijani composer, founder of the genre of symphonic mugham in world music Fikret Amirov.

== Honours and awards ==
- Stalin Prize (1949)
- USSR State Prize (1980)
- People's Artiste of the Azerbaijan SSR (1958)
- People's Artist of the USSR (1965)
- Hero of Socialist Labour (1982)
- Two Orders of Lenin (1959, 1982)
- Order of the Red Banner of Labour, twice (1967, 1971)
- State Prize of Azerbaijan SSR (1974)
- Lenin Komsomol Prize of Azerbaijan SSR (1967)

== See also ==
- List of People's Artists of the Azerbaijan SSR

== Sources ==
- Təhmirazqızı, Səadət (2012). Fikrət Əmirov. Baku: Aspoliqraf.
- Azərbaycan Milli Kitabxanası (2012). Azərbaycanın görkəmli şəxsiyyətləri. Fikrət Əmirov-90. Bakı: Elm.
