= Azerbaijani ballet =

Azerbaijani ballet (Azerbaijani: Azərbaycan baleti) is the training methods and aesthetic qualities seen in classical ballet in Azerbaijan.

== History ==
The Azerbaijani ballet originated in 1940, with the creation of the Maiden Tower ballet by Afrasiyab Badalbeyli. During that period, ballet was a relatively new genre for Azerbaijani spectators, but Maiden Tower managed to attract a large audience. It notably featured the first Azerbaijani ballerina, Gamar Almaszadeh, Badalbeyli's wife at the time.

The ballet Gulshan written by Soltan Hajibeyov was the second ballet staged successfully at the Azerbaijan State Academic Opera and Ballet Theater in 1950.

Azerbaijani ballet became known outside of Azerbaijan thanks to two ballets by Gara Garayev: Seven Beauties and The Path of Thunder.

Dancers such as Gamar Almaszadeh, Leyla Vakilova, Konstantin Batashov, Rafiga Akhundova, Vladimir Pletnyov and Chimnaz Babayeva made great contributions to the Azerbaijani ballet. In addition, directors such as Ismayil Hidayetzade, Mehdi Mammadov, Adil Isgandarov, Sultan Dadashov and Firudin Safarov and conductors such as Niyazi, Ashraf Hasanov, Ahad Israfilzade, Rauf Abdullayev and Kamal Abdullayev also contributed to the development of Azerbaijani ballet.

In 1969, dancers of the Azerbaijan State Academic Opera and Ballet Theater were awarded a diploma by the Paris Dance Academy at the International Dance Festival held at Champs-Élysées theater in Paris.

In 2010, the Azerbaijan State Academic Opera and Ballet Theater celebrated its 100th anniversary.

On 13 October 2014, Garayev's ballet Seven Beauties premiered in United States at the San Diego Civic Theatre in San Diego, California.

In February 2021, Seven Beauties premiered in Moscow Provincial Theater.

== Notable ballets ==
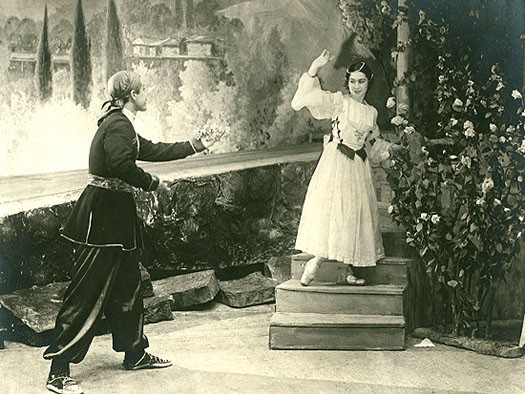
Scene from the ballet The Maiden Tower by Afrasiyab Badalbeyli

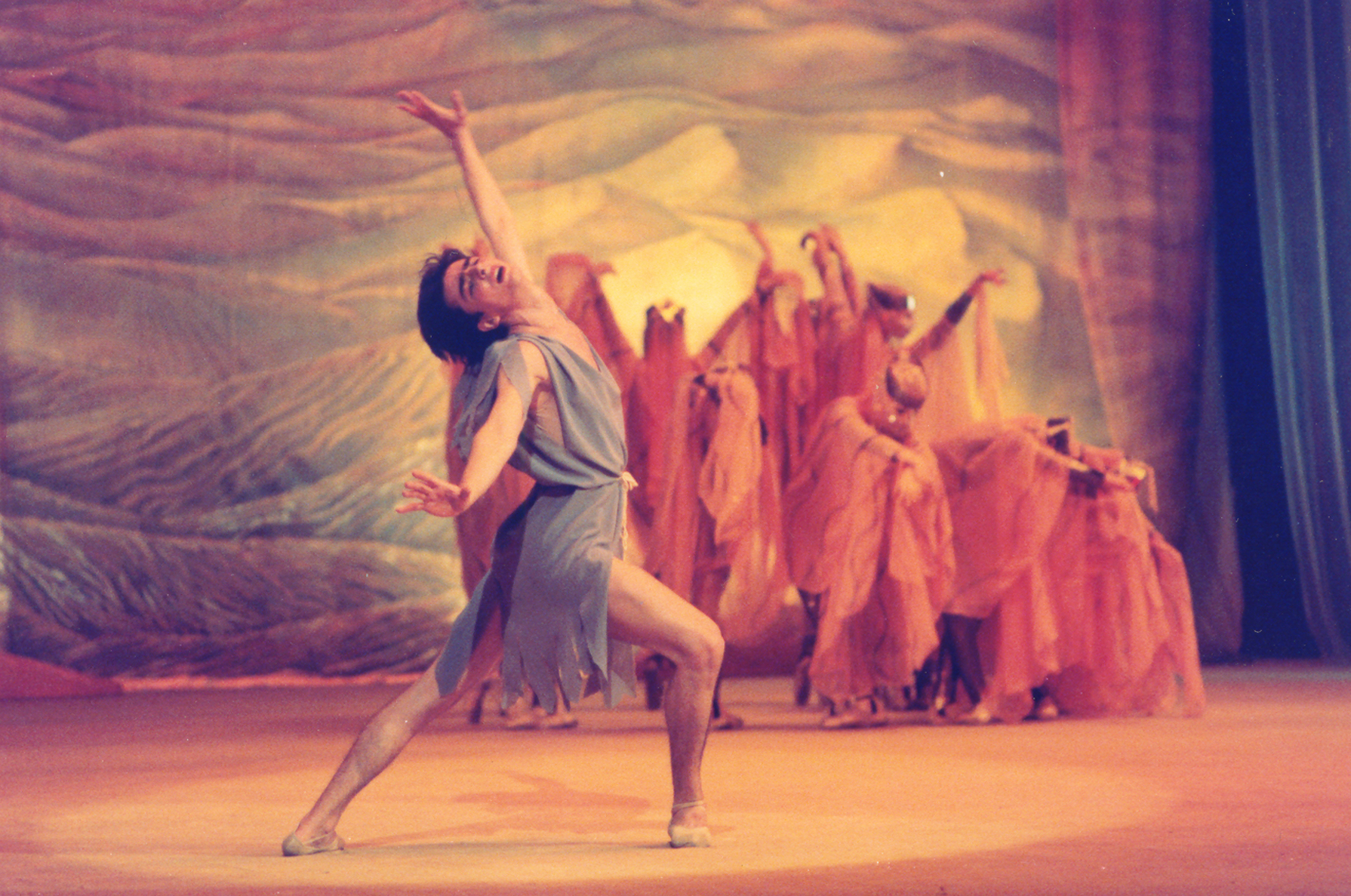
Scene from the ballet Leyli and Majnun by Gara Garayev

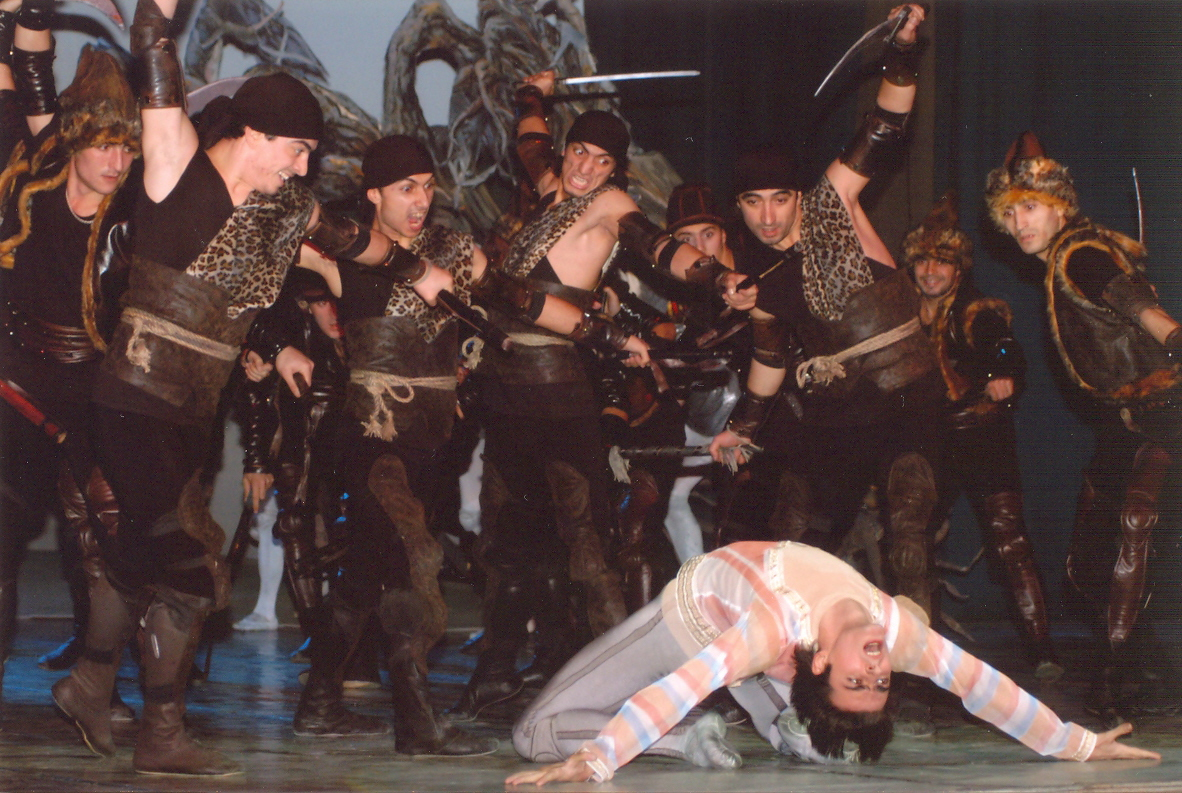
Scene from the ballet Love and Death by Polad Bülbüloğlu

The most important ballets in the Azerbaijani repertoire include:

- Maiden Tower by Afrasiyab Badalbeyli
- Smiling Man by Afrasiyab Badalbeyli
- Garaja by Afrasiyab Badalbeyli
- Tarlan by Afrasiyab Badalbeyli (children ballet)
- Seven Beauties by Gara Garayev
- The Path of Thunder by Gara Garayev
- Leyli and Majnun by Gara Garayev
- Arabian Nights by Fikret Amirov
- Nizami by Fikret Amirov
- The Legend of Nasimi by Fikret Amirov
- Caspian Conquerors by Fikret Amirov
- The Legend of Love by Arif Malikov
- Stronger than Death by Arif Malikov
- Twain by Arif Malikov
- Poem of Two Hearts by Arif Malikov
- Babek by Agshin Alizadeh
- Journey to the Caucasus by Agshin Alizadeh
- Whites and Blacks by Khayyam Mirzezadeh
- Love and Death by Polad Bülbüloğlu

== Notable dancers ==
- Rafiga Akhundova
- Madina Aliyeva
- Gamar Almaszadeh
- Chimnaz Babayeva
- Gulaghasy Mirzayev
- Tamilla Shiraliyeva
- Leyla Vakilova
- Khumar Zulfugarova
