= Chimnaz Babayeva =

Azerbaijani ballerina (1946–2019)

- Born: December 23, 1946; Baku, Azerbaijan SSR, USSR
- Died: December 23, 2019 (aged 73); Baku, Azerbaijan
- Citizenship: Soviet Union; Azerbaijan
- Education: Baku Choreography Academy
- Spouse: Vladimir Pletnyov
- Occupation(s): Ballet dancer, pedagogue
- Awards: People's Artist of the Azerbaijan SSR Honored Artist of the Azerbaijan SSR State Prize of the Azerbaijan SSR

Chimnaz Mammad gizi Babayeva (Azerbaijani: Çimnaz Məmməd qızı Babayeva, 23 December 1946 – 23 December 2019) was an Azerbaijani ballerina. She was awarded the title People's Artist of the Azerbaijan SSR, and Laureate of the State Prize of the Azerbaijan SSR.

== Biography ==
Chimnaz Babayeva was born on December 23, 1946, in Baku. From 1954 to 1964 she studied at Baku Choreography School, after graduating from high school, she had been a soloist at Azerbaijan State Opera and Ballet Theater. Later, she worked as a coach-pedagogue in the theater, and in recent years she moved away from the stage due to her illness.

Chimnaz Babayeva died on December 23, 2019, her 73rd birthday.

== Career ==
At the age of 9, she appeared on the big stage for the first time as Buratino in the ballet of Boris Zeidman "The Golden Key". Together with his wife Vladimir Pletnyov she had set up dance for the opera "The Fate of the Singer" (Jahangir Jahangirov). She had performed with the troupe of Azerbaijan State Academic Opera and Ballet Theater in many countries (France, Italy, Norway, Sweden, Burma, India, Turkey, etc.).

The main parts performed by Chimnaz Babayeva:

Part	Ballet	Author
Shirin	Legend of Love	Arif Malikov
Aisha	Seven Beauties	Gara Garayev
Sari	The Path of Thunder	Gara Garayev
Girl	Shur	Fikret Amirov
Lover of Nasimi	Epic of Nasimi	Fikret Amirov
Gulyanag	Maiden Tower	Afrasiyab Badalbeyli
Giselle	Giselle	Adolphe Adam
The lady	The Lady and the Hooligan	Dmitri Shostakovich
Kitri	Don Quixote	Ludwig Minkus

== Awards ==
- Honored Artist of the Azerbaijan SSR — 21 May 1970
- People's Artist of the Azerbaijan — 10 January 1978
- State Prize of the Azerbaijan SSR — 1974
- Personal pension of the President of the Republic of Azerbaijan — 11 June 2002
