= Azerbaijani classical music =

Azerbaijani classical music (Azerbaijani: Azərbaycan klassik musiqisi) includes a range of musical styles rooted in the traditions of Western or European classical music that European settlers brought to the country from the 20th century and onwards.

== History ==
=== Azerbaijan Democratic Republic era ===
The professional classical music in Azerbaijan is associated with name of composer Uzeyir Hajibeyov.

=== Soviet era ===
In 1920, Azerbaijani classical music had undergone a renaissance and Baku Academy of Music was founded to give classical musicians the same support as folk musicians. After World War II, Fikret Amirov introduced a new genre called symphonic mugam. Amirov's symphonic mugams were based on classical folk pieces and were performed by many renowned symphony orchestras throughout the world, such as the Houston Symphony Orchestra conducted by Leopold Stokowski.

=== Post-Soviet era ===
In the present era, classical music in Azerbaijan must contend and co-exist with a dominant culture of popular music. Specialist music education at establishments such as the Asaf Zeynally Music School in Baku and Baku Academy of Music provide music teaching to classical musicians.

Modern day advocates of Western classical music in Azerbaijani include Farhad Badalbeyli, Fidan Gasimova and Franghiz Alizadeh.

== Festivals and venues ==
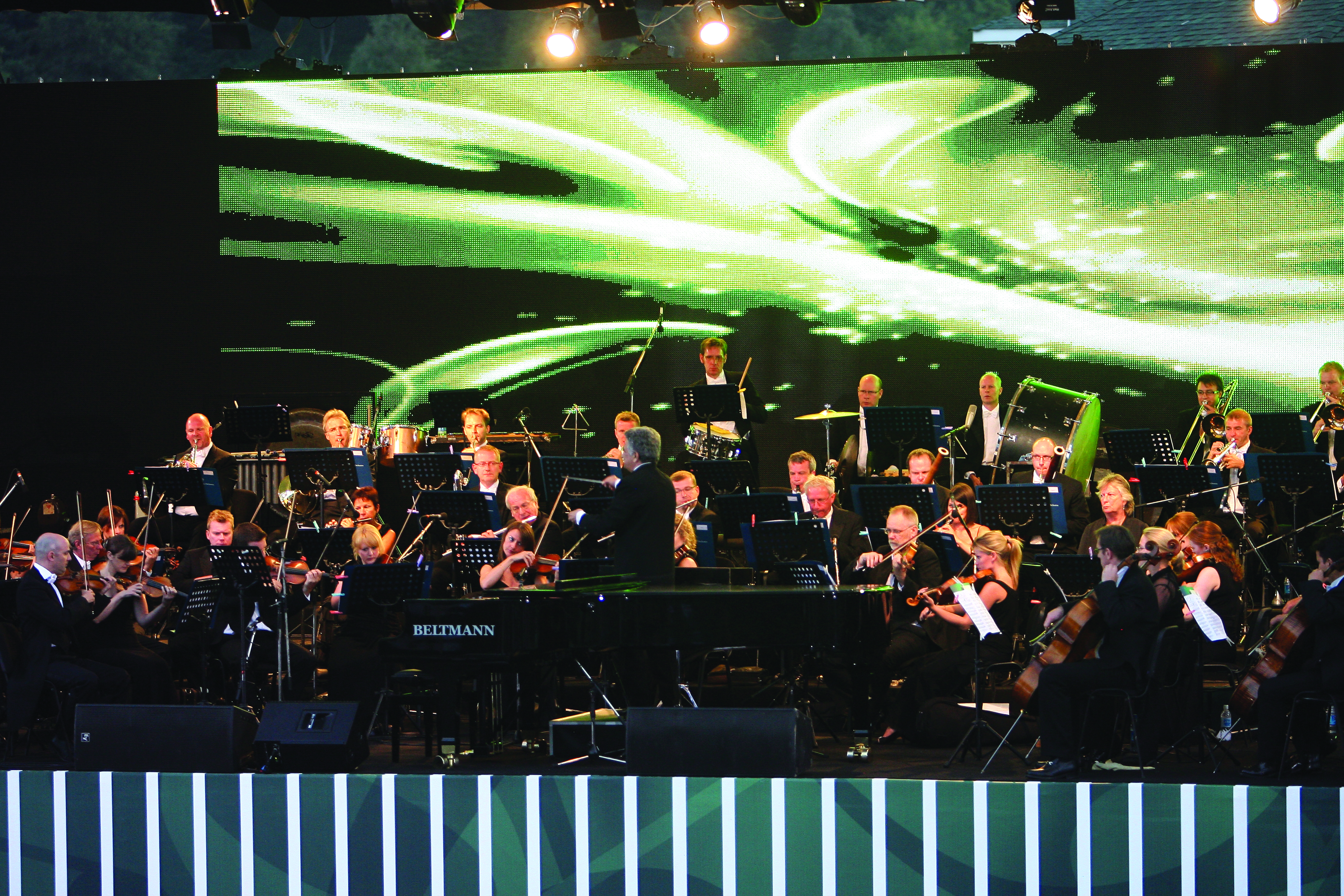
Gabala International Music Festival is one of the most popular music festivals in Azerbaijan.

Azerbaijan is host to many major orchestras, festivals and venues. The Gabala International Music Festival and Uzeyir Hajibeyov International Music Festival have presented annual music programmes of international status since the early 21st century.

== Notable Performers ==
=== Composers ===
Fikrat Amirov · Tofig Bakikhanov · Afrasiyab Badalbeyli
Uzeyir Hajibeyov · Gara Garayev · Muslim Magomayev

- Vasif Adigozalov
- Shafiga Akhundova
- Agshin Alizadeh
- Franghiz Alizadeh
- Fikrat Amirov
- Afrasiyab Badalbeyli
- Farhad Badalbeyli
- Tofig Bakikhanov
- Faraj Garayev
- Gara Garayev
- Tofig Guliyev
- Soltan Hajibeyov
- Uzeyir Hajibeyov
- Zulfugar Hajibeyov
- Jovdat Hajiyev
- Rauf Hajiyev
- Jahangir Jahangirov
- Haji Khanmammadov
- Muslim Magomayev
- Arif Malikov
- Eldar Mansurov
- Arif Mirzayev
- Khayyam Mirzazade
- Niyazi
- Said Rustamov
- Emin Sabitoglu
- Ali Salimi
- Huseyngulu Sarabski
- Asya Sultanova
- Alakbar Taghiyev
- Asaf Zeynalli

=== Conductors ===
- Elnara Kerimova

=== Orchestras ===
- Azerbaijan State Orchestra of Folk Instruments
- Azerbaijan State Symphony Orchestra
