= Maiden Tower (Baku) =

12th-century monument in Azerbaijan

- Qız Qalası برج دختر
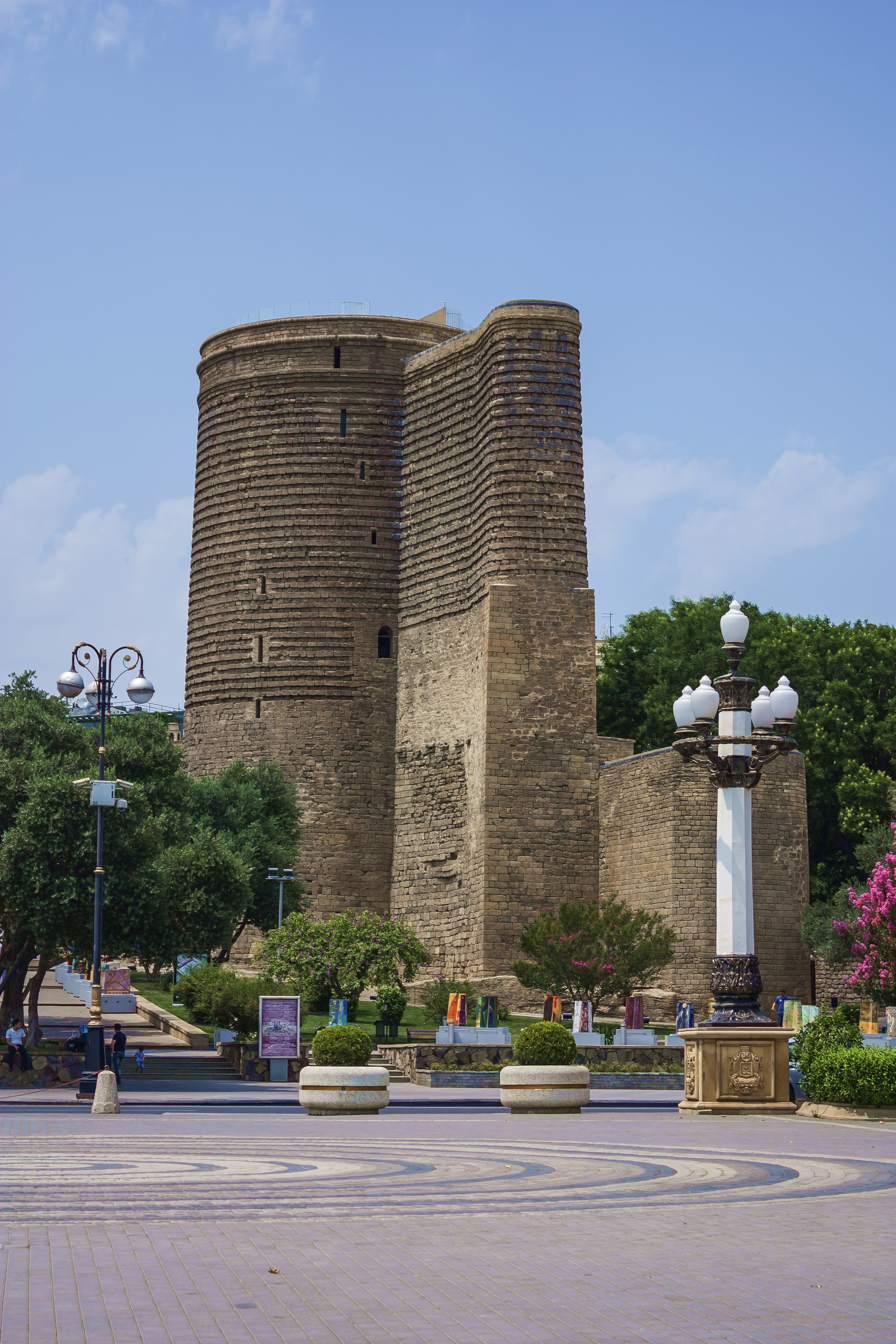
- The Maiden Tower
- Interactive map of Maiden Tower
- Location: Old City, Baku, Azerbaijan
- Coordinates: 40.3661°N 49.8372°E
- Type: Tower
- Height: 29.5 m (97 ft)
- Completion date: 12th century

UNESCO World Heritage Site
- Official name: Walled City of Baku with the Shirvanshahs' Palace and Maiden Tower
- Type: Cultural
- Criteria: iv
- Designated: 2000 (24th session)
- Reference no.: 958
- Region: Europe/Asia
- Endangered: 2003–2009

The Maiden Tower (Azerbaijani: Qız qalası, Persian: برج دختر) is a 12th-century monument in the Old City, Baku, Azerbaijan. Along with the Shirvanshahs' Palace, dated to the 15th century, it forms a group of historic monuments listed in 2001 under the UNESCO World Heritage List of Historical Monuments as cultural property, Category III. It was built, like most buildings in the Old City, by the Shirvanshahs, and is one of Azerbaijan's most distinctive national emblems, and is thus featured on Azerbaijani currency notes and official letterheads.

The Maiden Tower houses a museum, which presents the story of the historic evolution of Baku city. It also has a gift shop. The view from the roof takes in the alleys and minarets of the Old City, the Baku Boulevard, the Isa bek Hajinski House and a wide vista of the Baku Bay.

The tower is often subject to speculations about its origin. Some epics on the topic were used for the librettos for ballets and theatre's plays. The ballet Maiden Tower is a piece of the Azerbaijani ballet created by composer Afrasiyab Badalbeyli in 1940; a revised version of the ballet was premiered in 1999.

With the recession of the Caspian Sea shoreline during the first millennium of the common era, a strip of land emerged. This land was developed between the 9th and 15th centuries, when the walls of the old city and the palace, including the huge bastion of the Maiden Tower, were built.

== History ==
Some scientific sources indicate that the Maiden Tower is a paramount example of Zoroastrianism and the pre-Islamic architecture in Iran and Azerbaijan. Davud A. Akhundov provides archeological and architectural evidence and argues that the Tower is Zoroastrians' Fire temple-Tower which had 7 fire exits on the top of the tower. Zoroastrian believed that there are 7 Steps or 7 Sky to reach heaven.

Davud A.Akhundov and Hassan Hassanov date the fire temple-tower approximately as 8th-7th century B.C.

The Maiden Tower, set in the south-east part of Icheri Sheher, has mystique and hoary history and legends that are linked to two periods, though not conclusively established. The area was first settled in the Palaeolithic period.

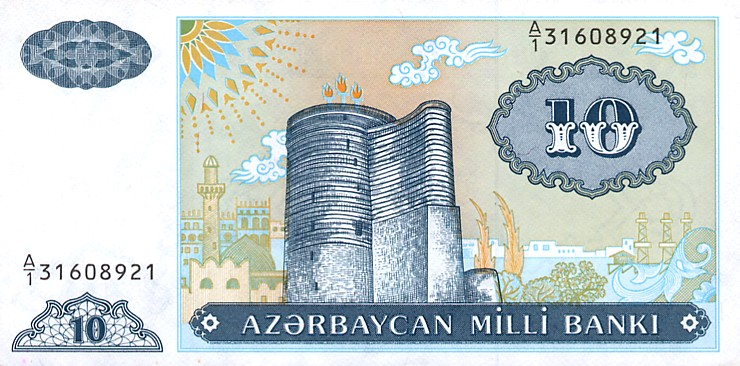
Depiction of Maiden Tower on a 10 Azerbaijani manat banknote (1993)

Sara Ashurbeyli, Professor and prominent historian and expert in the history of Baku has calculated that the tower foundations, which extend 15 metres below ground level and the bottom three stories above ground, were originally built between the 4th and 6th centuries CE and points out the marked difference in the stone used in the tower compared to the stone used in the medieval city surrounding it. This conclusion is partly supported by historian Bretanitskiy, who has postulated that the tower was partly built in the 5th to 6th centuries and then later in the 12th century. The site was believed to have been used originally during the Sasanid era as a Zoroastrian temple. An inscription located 14 metres high on the south wall which in old Kufic script mentions Qubbeye Masud ibn Davud (or Kubey Mesud ibn Da’ud), an architect active during the 12th century; he is the father of the architect who built the Mardakan Round Tower. However, it is disputed as the inscription, unlike the Mardakan Tower inscription, does not actually reveal him to have been the architect, although it is generally agreed that much of the modern tower dates back to the 12th century. Ahmadov believes that the tower was used as an astronomical observatory from the time of this reconstruction, due to the fact that 30 hewed stone protuberances on the tower's lower section and the 31 protuberances on the upper section, linked with a stone belt, correlate to the days of the month.

According to recent archaeological excavations, carried out in 1962–63 on the ground floor of the tunnel, the tower was built on a large rock sloping toward the sea, and the buttress structure projecting out from the main tower provided stability to the tower. Further excavations have also revealed wooden girders, each 14 metres (46 ft) high, at the foundation of the tower. This has been inferred as an earthquake-resistant design. It has also been conjectured that the cylindrical shape of the tower with 5 metres (16 ft) thick base walls tapering to 4.5 metres (15 ft) (4 metres (13 ft) is also mentioned) provided the solid foundation on which it has survived over the centuries. It is also mentioned that the tower was built at one go and not at different times as inferred by other scholars.

The tower and other wall structures now under the UNESCO list were strengthened during the Russian rule in 1806 and have survived.

The Maiden Tower is depicted on the obverse of the Azerbaijani 1 to 250 manat banknotes of 1992–2006, and of the 10 manat banknote issued since 2006, as well as on the obverse of the Azerbaijani 50 qəpik coin minted between 1992 and 2006 and the reverse 5 qəpik coin minted since 2006.

== Legends and mysteries ==
There are various mysteries and legends related to Baku's Maiden Tower. However, the main mystery is the Tower's design and purpose. Meanwhile, there are up to 20 legends related to Baku Maiden Tower. A large number of them are connected to the Islamic and Medieval period of Baku's history. But others are rooted deeply in Azerbaijan's Zoroastrian or pre-Islamic history, religion, and culture. Probably, the most famous legend is that of the fiery-haired virgin girl who saved Baku's people from slavery. The epic shows roots to Azerbaijan's Zoroastrian beliefs and culture and has reached down to modern times.

According to research by Veyis Ibragimov, the Maiden Tower was built for oil refining and is analogous to modern distillation columns.

=== The Legend of the Fire-Color-Haired Virgin Girl Savior ===
A long time ago, there existed the ancient town-fortress of Baku. The fortress had a Fire Temple Tower. At one point in Baku’s history, the enemy managed to encircle the fortress. The enemy demanded that the people of Baku surrender, but they refused. Consequently, the enemy launched a siege to demolish the fortress and capture all the inhabitants as slaves. As a result, many defenders of the fortress died while attempting to stop the enemy's attacks. The enemy's commander ordered the water supply lines cut in an attempt to drive the fortress's defenders into submission. Everybody in the fortress was thirsty. They had no water, nor food - only blood and death. The Supreme Magi, together with other priests, prayed to the Holy Fire kept in the fortress's Fire Temple Tower, asking the god Ahura Mazda to help and protect the people. They prayed day and night, asking the All-Mighty and Merciful Ahura Mazda to save their lives and push the enemy back.

Finally, the supreme god Ahura Mazda heard the magi and people's prayers. One day, people saw a large piece of the Holy Fire falling from the top of the Fire Temple Tower. A beautiful girl came up from the fire. She had long fire-colored hair. The crowd went down on their knees and started to pray to her. The girl said: "Don't be afraid! I am here to help and protect you! Give me a sword and helmet! The enemy must not see my fire-colored hair. Open the fortress gate!"

Meanwhile, the enemy commander was waiting outside for a one-on-one fight with the fortress pahlevan (hero). If the fortress pahlevan were to win the fight, the enemy's army would retreat, but, if the enemy commander were to win, the fortress would be destroyed and the surviving inhabitants would be enslaved.

The fortress gate opened, and the enemy commander saw the fortress's pahlevan was coming to fight. A heavy battle began. In one of the god-blessed moments that ensued, the fortress pahlevan unhorsed the enemy and put a sword directly at his neck. The enemy screamed, "Oh, you win! Who are you? Take your helmet off. I want to see your face, Pahlevan!" She took off the helmet and he saw that the fortress pahlevan was a beautiful girl with long, fire-colored hair. He exclaimed, "Oh, you are a girl! You are a brave and beautiful girl! If the girls of Baku are so brave, I will never capture your fortress! Do not kill me, beauty!"

He fell in love with her because of her beauty and bravery and asked her to marry him. Of course, the girl did not kill him, fell in love with him because of his open heart.

Ultimately, the enemy did not capture Baku and the local people named a tower as the Maiden tower.

=== A Second Version of the Maiden Savior ===
Long ago, the fortress city of Bade-Qube (Baku) was besieged by the enemy. Bade-Qube had three rows of defense walls, but they had all been encircled by the enemy.

After the siege had gone on for ninety days, the rulers knew they must act. Inside the fortress close to the sea, there was a high and black steaming tower temple in which old rituals were performed to save the Holy Fire. The temple's principal magus, Egirwand, performed old fire rituals, proclaiming to the fire worshipers: "Tomorrow, the Shah will be killed by the unknown and virginal power." The temple door suddenly opened and a virgin girl with flaming hair came out. She was illuminated by the temple's holy fire and held a flaming sword in her hands. Covered by the flame, she exited the temple and stood by the principal Magus. The Magus said, "You must save the holy city, a capital of eternal fires, and save the Tower that created you."

Thus, the moonface flaming girl looked for the last time on the temple-tower and went into battle with general Nureddin and his troops. She kept her promise and saved her countrymen, but she fell in love with the enemy general, whom she had killed. She thus decided to kill herself, stabbing her own shoulder with her sword and giving her soul to the Holy Fire Tower. After she killed herself, the Khazri and Gilavar winds blew strongly for seven days. Since then, the temple fires have stopped burning, and the temple was named the Maiden Tower (Qiz Qalasi) after the holy virgin girl savior.

=== The legend of why Baku tower's fires stopped burning ===
Once upon a time, an enemy besieged the fortress of Baku. However, the people of Baku refused to surrender and decided to fight on and defend their lives. They fought with great bravery, but the situation inside the fortress grew increasingly desperate. The enemy launched a tight siege to subdue the defenders by cutting water supply.

Meanwhile, the Supreme Magus and other priests prayed to the All-Mighty God Ahura Mazda in the fortress's Holy Fire Temple Tower for assistance.

After several days of continuous prayers, Ahura Mazda heard the priests' blessings and prayers. A strong and devastating earthquake occurred, in which the enemy army perished. Thus, the All-Mighty Ahura Mazda destroyed the enemy and Baku's people escaped slavery, but the Holy Fires stopped burning on top of Baku's Fire Temple Tower.

== Architecture ==
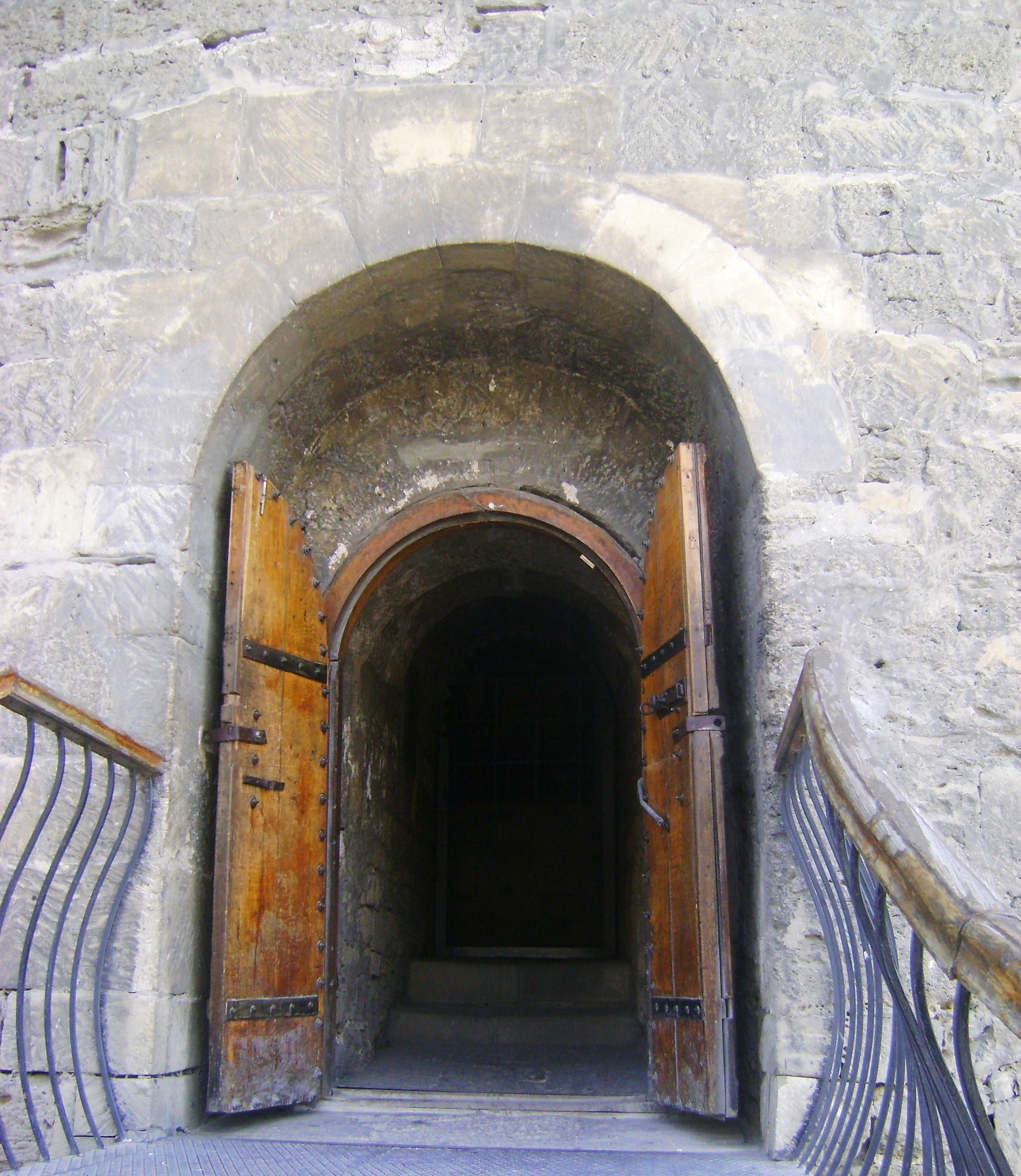
The entrance

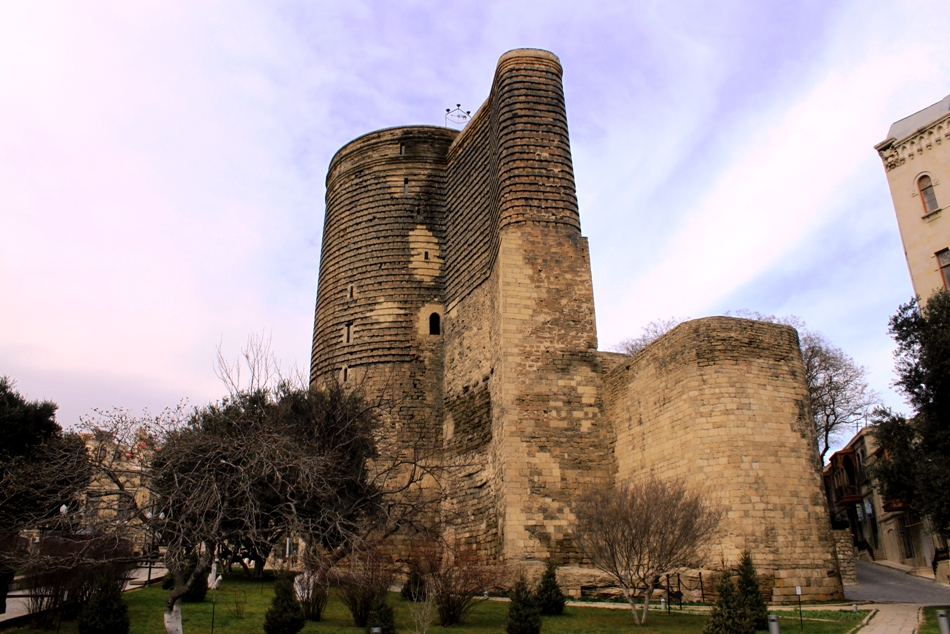
Architectural details of the Maiden Tower

The tower has been described as the "most majestic and mysterious monument of Baku, the Gyz Galasy", built on solid rock foundation, demonstrates right on the coastline, a fusion of Arabic, Persian and Ottoman influences. It was constructed alongside a natural oil well. It is a cylindrical eight-story structure that rises to a height of 29.5 metres (97 ft) with a base diameter of 16.5 metres (54 ft). The internal space available in the tower is said to be adequate to accommodate 200 people. A long solid projection to the main tower faces east, which is oriented towards sunrise pointing to the equinoxes, which has led to the conclusion that it was built as an astronomical tower; while the buttress faces east, the door access to the tower faces south-east. Each floor of the tower has a shallow vaulted roof, "a stone cupola" that has a central opening. The thickness of the walls varies from 5 metres (16 ft) at the base, tapering cylindrically to 3.2–4.2 metres (10–14 ft) at the top floors. All floors are connected by a staircase which abuts the circular wall and are lighted by narrow windows or niches which flare inward. The structure built in stone-masonry exhibits varying finished surfaces, which is inlaid with local grey limestone. The alternate courses of stone laid in gypsum plaster gives a black and white banded effect. The northwestern part of the tower retains the original surface finish. There is also a beak-like projection, a buttress, curved in shape, made in masonry. The earliest stonework has square corners.

A detailed examination of the construction features of the tower by archaeologists suggests that the stone-masonry, both on its interior and exterior surfaces, is diamond-shaped and is seen at the top as well as at the bottom of the tower wall. The diamond-shaped cut seen as a decorative feature, particularly on the outer face of the west side wall, is ornate at the top and plain at the bottom of the wall; a subtle feature noted throughout the tower suggests that it was built as one monolith unit at one period. However, the recent renovations are stated to be crude.

Water Well

Another notable structure seen in the tower is a water well of 0.7 metres (2.3 ft) diameter, which is 21 metres (69 ft) deep (its depth is up to the aquifer) that has been discovered at the second floor of the tower. It also has an entrance at the ground level, which was discovered by Archaeologist Abbas Islamov during a recent study of the tower. This well has been interpreted as a rainwater harvesting structure, and the water is said to be clean and fresh (though close to the sea). The ceramic pipe (30 centimetres (12 in) in diameter) plumbing seen running down from the niches of the tower into the well was meant as a supply source. Since the ancient plumbing system is said to be in its original form, it needs to be cleaned and its layout ascertained by further studies to describe the drainage network that was originally built as part of the tower. The ceramics of the plumbing system and the silt deposited in them could also help to fix the age of the tower by using thermo-luminescence technique.

Also seen in the tower, between the 2nd floor and the 7th floor, is a gutter of semicircular shape at every floor. It is made of ceramic pipes fitted one above another and joined by lime mortar. The pipes are presumably produced with the potter's wheel technique. They are 20–25 centimetres (7.9–9.8 in) in diameter with 2.2 centimetres (0.87 in) thick walls, and each segment is 40–45 centimetres (16–18 in) long. Similar gutters are seen from the ground floor up to the foundation level but with the four-cornered ceramic pipes of 22 centimetres (8.7 in) × 18 centimetres (7.1 in) size, which run outside through the wall.

== Restoration ==
Subsequent to the declaration of the entire cultural property including the tower and the city walls as a UNESCO World Heritage Site, an earthquake in 2000 caused damage to the property. UNESCO, noting the lack of efforts by the national authorities to adequately conserve this cultural heritage then listed these monuments under the "List of World Heritage in Danger," from 2004 to 2009 with the comment "Loss of authenticity due in part to the earthquake in 2000 and to the urban development pressures." However, after the concerned authorities evolved a Conservation Master Plan and assured of adequate conservation and management of the property, the "in danger" tag attached to the heritage site has been removed by UNESCO in 2009. It was also requested that the State Party would submit to the World Heritage Centre, by 1 February 2010, an updated report on the state of conservation of the property and progress made for consideration by the World Heritage Committee at its 34th session in 2010.

In 2011–2013 the tower underwent a restoration. At that time, in 2011, plexiglass barriers were installed around the tower's observation deck to prevent suicides.

== In popular culture ==
The legendary tale of the king willing to force his daughter to marry a man she doesn't love, which she escapes by asking her father to first build a tower for her and then committing suicide by jumping from the top of it, has been the subject of many Azerbaijani poems and plays. The ballet titled Maiden Tower was the first Azerbaijani ballet composed by Afrasiyyab Badalbayli, in 1940. This ballet is performed at Baku's Opera and Ballet Theatre. However, the storyline is a modified version of the legend. According to the ballet, the king, on his return from his war campaign, found that his wife had given birth to a daughter instead of a son. He became furious and ordered the killing of his baby daughter. However, the baby's nanny took her away to a secret place, where she grew up as a beautiful lady. At age seventeen, she got engaged to a lover. At this juncture, the king chanced to see her, wanted to marry her and therefore took her away and kept her in the Maiden Tower. The girl's lover was furious with this turn of events, and he managed to kill the king. He then ran to the Maiden Tower to rescue his lover. However, when the girl heard the sound of footsteps approaching the tower, she thought that it was the king coming to see her, and she immediately committed suicide by jumping down from the tower.

As of 2011, the tower also participates in "Earth Hour," a campaign against climate change in which large buildings "go dark" for an hour to draw awareness to the cause.

== Picture gallery ==
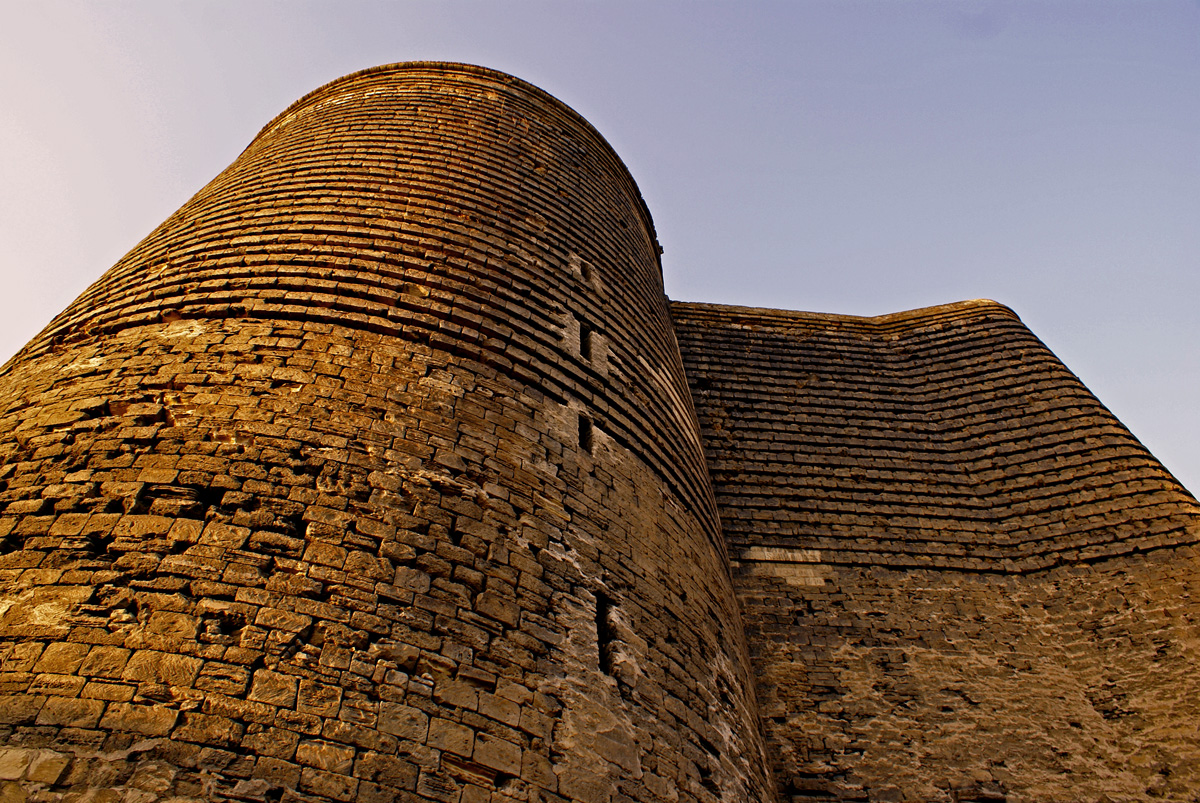
The Maiden Tower in old town Baku.

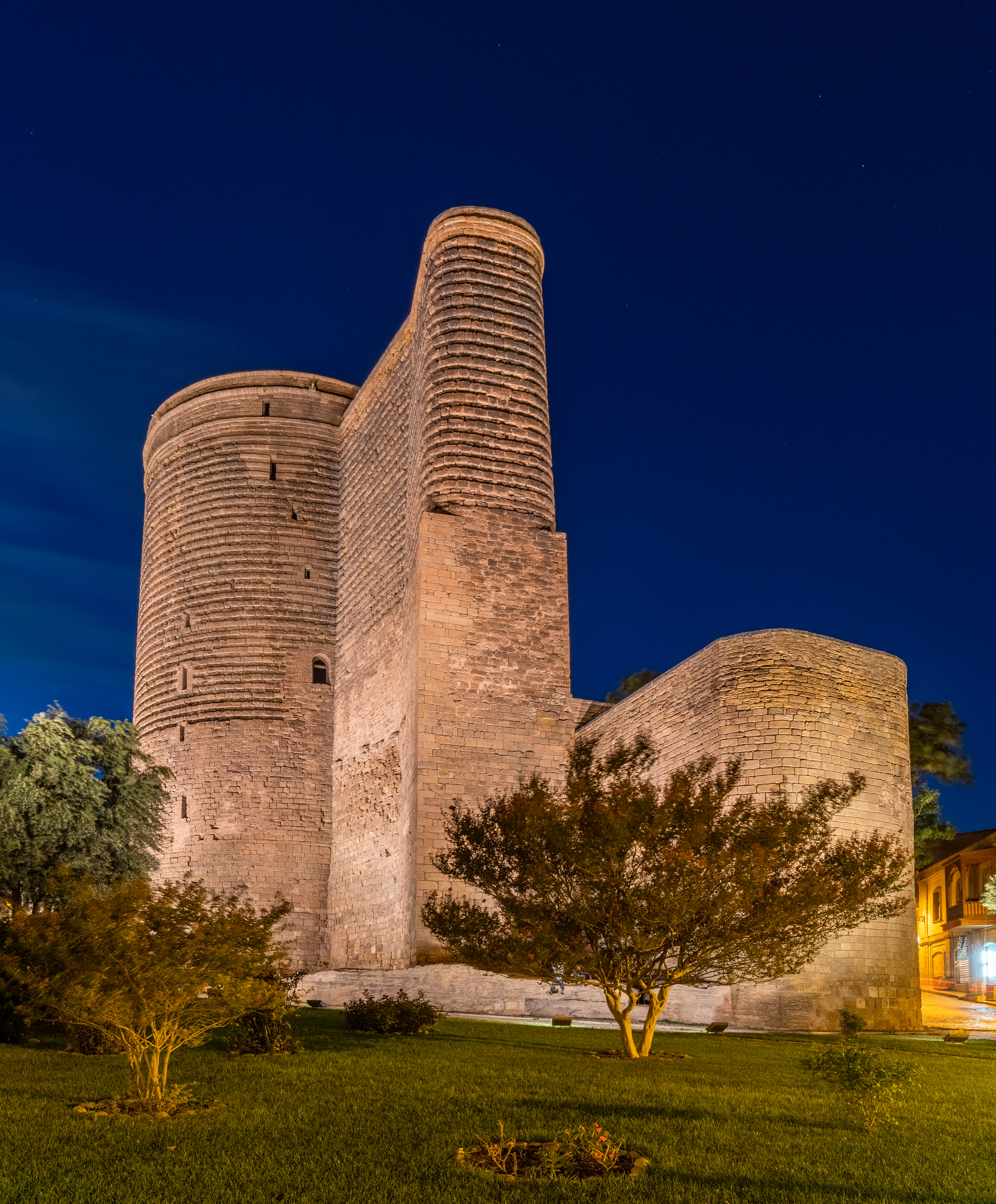
Illuminated Maiden Tower

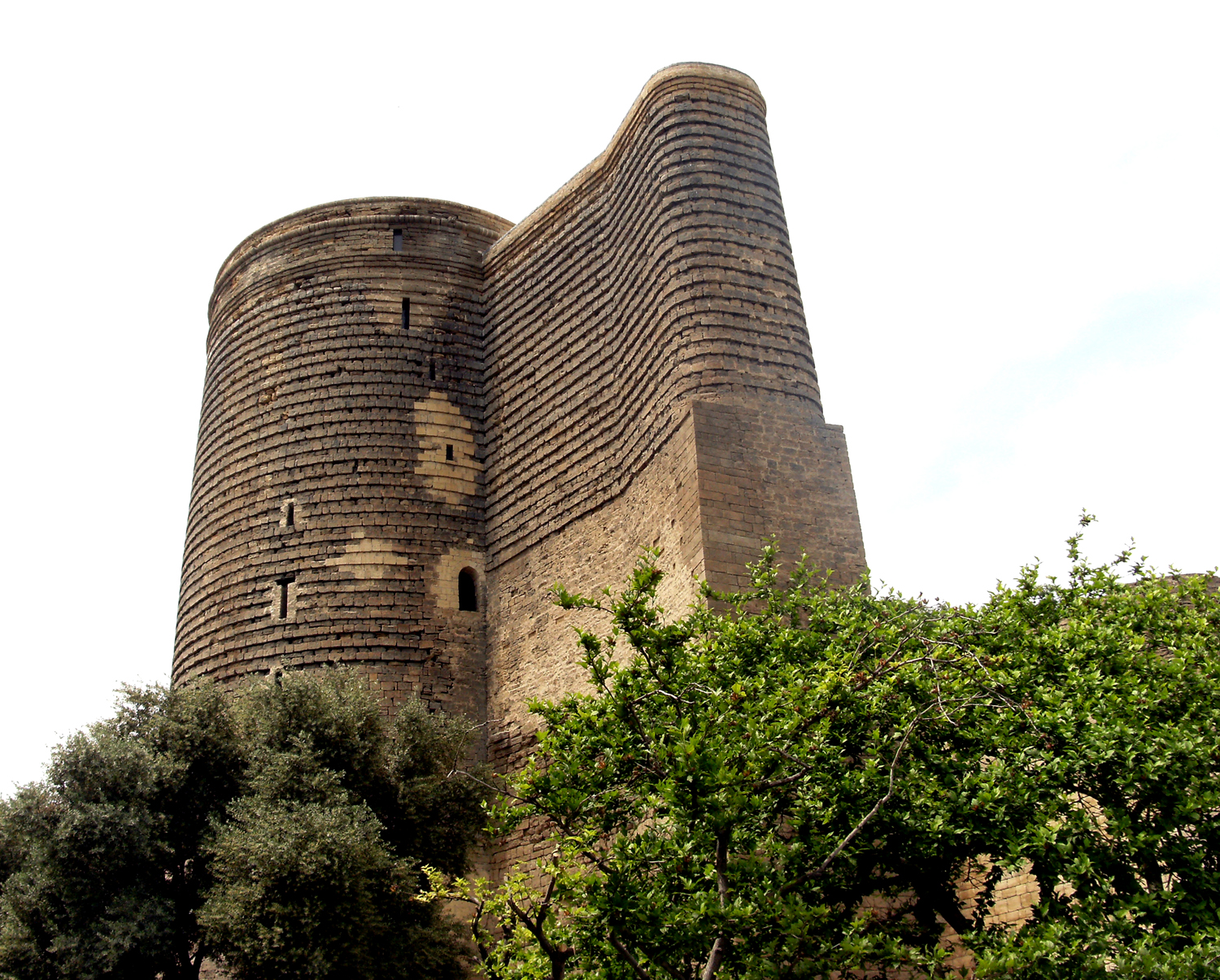

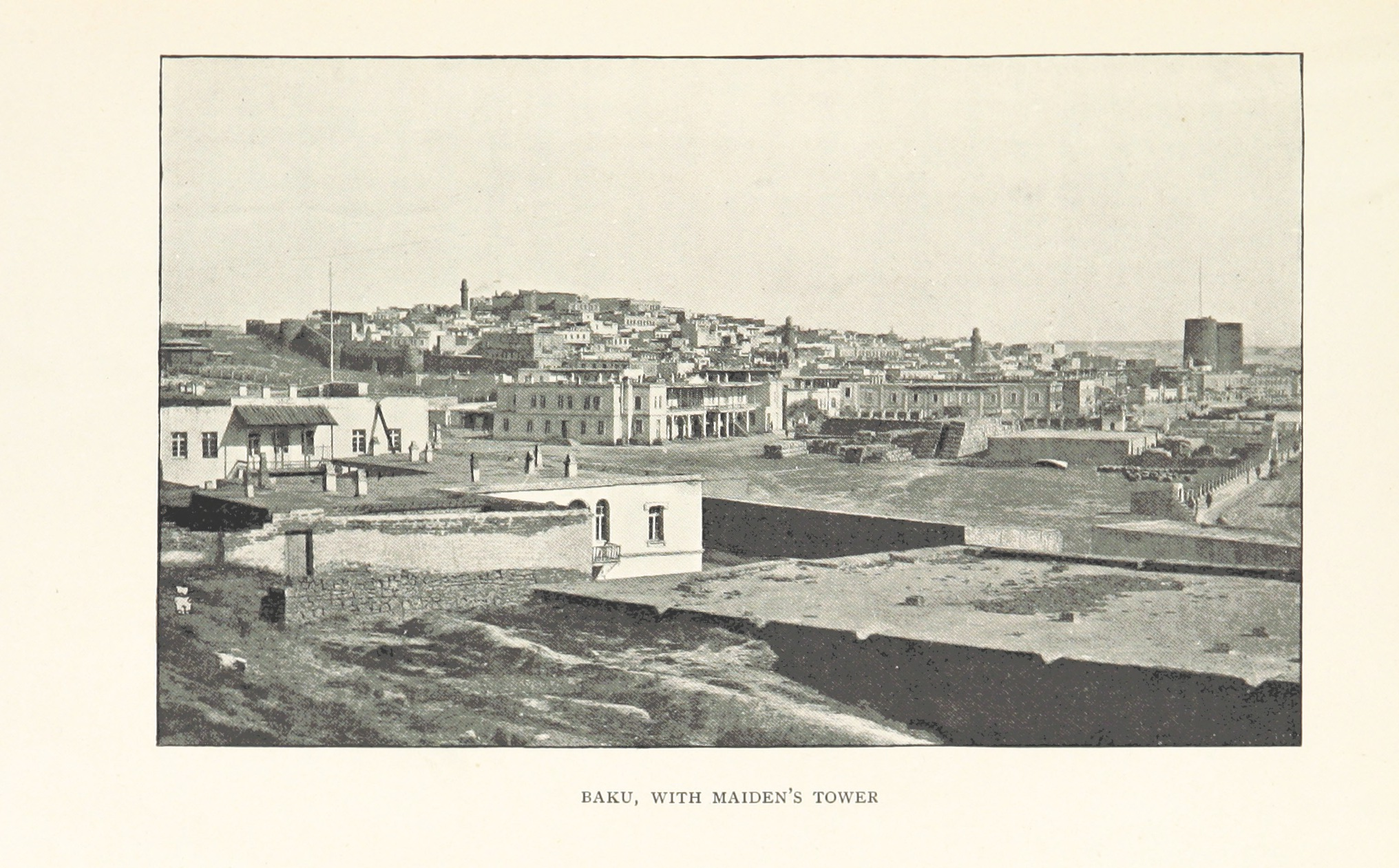

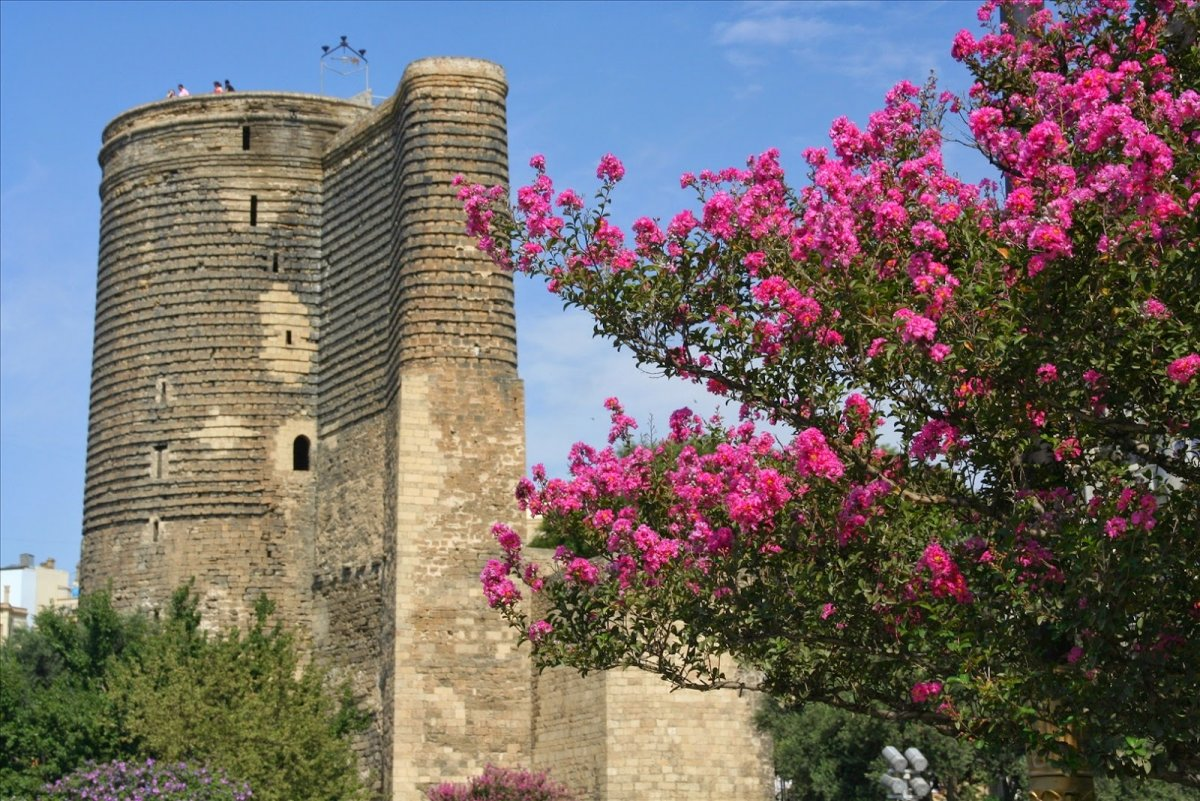

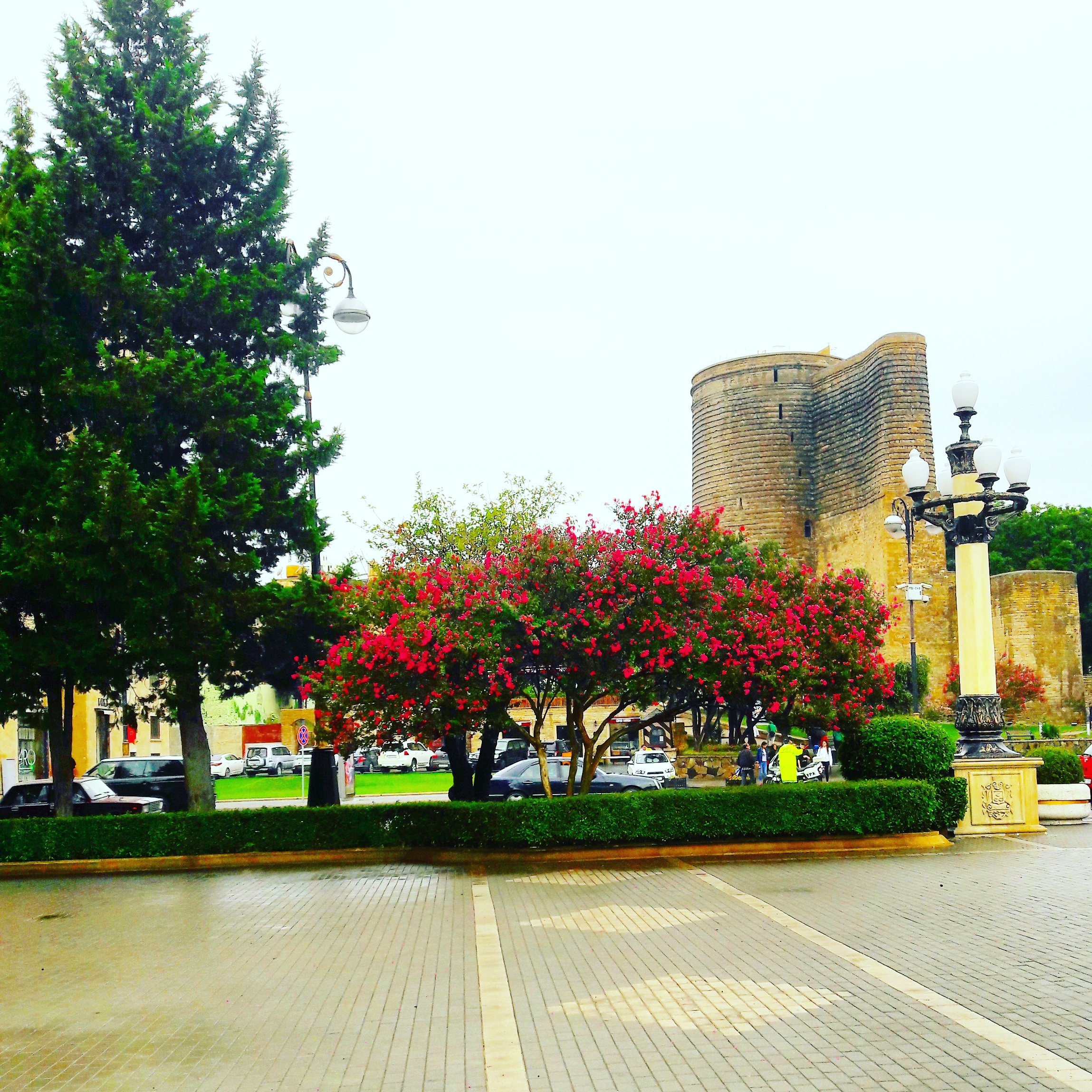

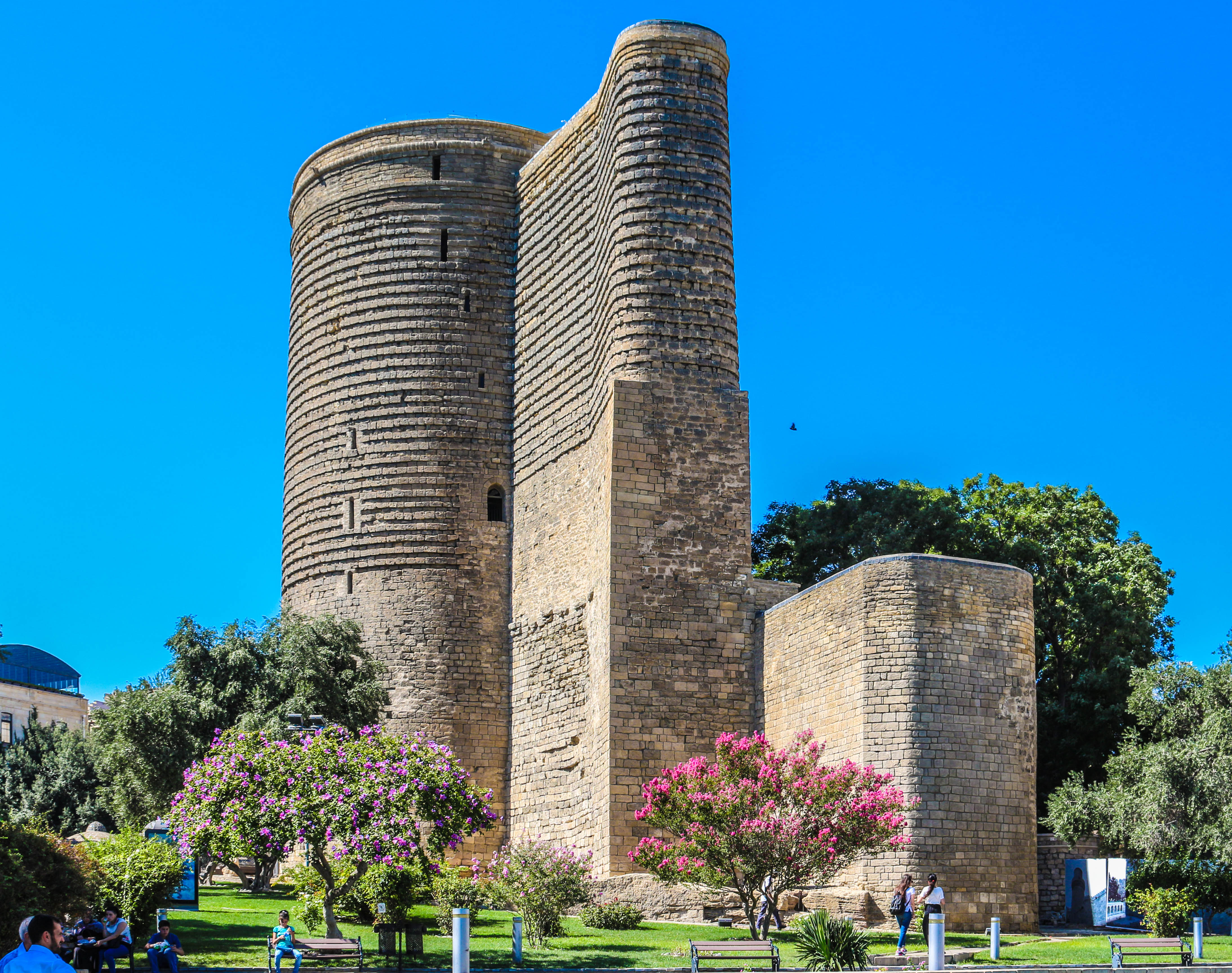

== See also ==
- Gobustan Rock Art Cultural Landscape
- Fire Temple of Baku
- List of World Heritage Sites in Azerbaijan
