= Kikijan =

Azerbaijani Folk Dance

External videos
- Dance Kikijan

Kikijan (Azerbaijani: Kikican) is an Azerbaijani folk dance. The Azerbaijani composer Afrasiyab Badalbeyli used the melody of the dance in The Maiden Tower ballet.
