= Leyla Vakilova =

- Born: January 29, 1927; Baku, Baku uezd, Azerbaijan SSR, USSR
- Died: February 20, 1999 (aged 72); Baku, Azerbaijan
- Resting place: Alley of Honor
- Occupations: Ballet dancer, ballet master, choreographer
- Years active: 1943-1999
- Awards

Leyla Mahad qizi Vakilova (Azerbaijani: Leyla Vəkilova; 27 January 1927, Baku – 21 February 1999, Baku) was a Soviet and Azerbaijani ballerina and ballet instructor.

== Career ==
Leyla Vakilova was born in Baku, Azerbaijan Soviet Socialist Republic, Soviet Union (now Azerbaijan). She took ballet lessons at the Baku School of Choreography from prominent Azerbaijani ballerina Gamar Almaszadeh.

In 1945, she left for Moscow to gain experience in the field of ballet at the Moscow State Academy of Choreography. After returning to Baku in 1946, she made her first ballet performance as Tao Khoa in The Red Poppy by Reinhold Glière at the Azerbaijan State Academic Opera and Ballet Theatre where she worked for the next 30 years. Her early performances in Azerbaijani ballets by Afrasiyab Badalbeyli, Soltan Hajibeyov, Gara Garayev, Fikrat Amirov and Arif Malikov brought her great fame, which was recognized by the awarding of the Order of Lenin to her.

In 1967, Vakilova was granted the title of the People's Artist of the USSR. She also became head of the Azerbaijan State Song and Dance Ensemble founded by her teacher Gamar Almaszadeh. From 1953, she taught ballet at the Baku School of Choreography. In 1972, at the age of 45, Leyla Vakilova retired from ballet, even though she continued her teaching career at the School of Choreography until she died in 1999.

== See also ==
- List of People's Artistes of the Azerbaijan SSR
