= Gamar Almaszadeh =

Soviet and Azerbaijani ballerina and ballet instructor

- Qəmər Almaszadə
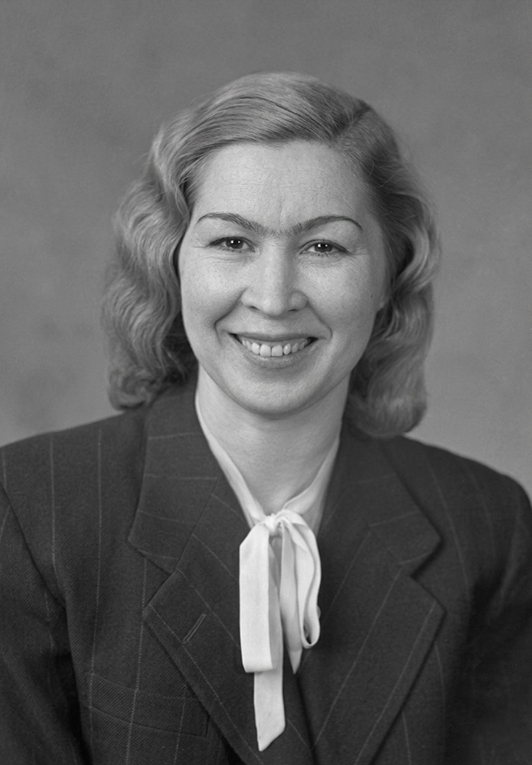
- Almaszadeh in 1952
- Born: March 10, 1915; Baku, Caucasus Viceroyalty, Russian Empire
- Died: April 7, 2006 (aged 91); Baku, Azerbaijan
- Occupations: Ballet dancer, ballet master, choreographer, pedagogue
- Awards: People's Artist of the USSR (1959); People's Artiste of the Azerbaijan SSR (1943); State Stalin Prize (1952); Shohrat Order (1995); Order of Lenin (1985)

Gamar Hajiaga qizi Almaszadeh (Note: Azerbaijani: Qəmər Hacıağa qızı Almaszadə; Russian: Гамэр Гаджиага кызы Алмасзаде, romanized: Gamer Gadzhiaga kyzy Almaszade) (10 March 1915 – 7 April 2006) was a Soviet and Azerbaijani ballerina and ballet instructor. She's considered the first ballerina of the Muslim world.

== Early life ==
Gamar Almaszadeh (nicknamed Tamara) was born in Baku to a family of a shoemaker and a midwife, Hajiaga and Maryam Almaszadeh. She became interested in ballet at a very young age when she saw her friend perform ballet moves. Persuaded by her friend she signed up for ballet lessons at a private studio (later reorganized into the Baku School of Choreography). Gamar's mother approved of her daughter's new interest but her father Hajiaga Almaszadeh, a conservative Muslim, had to be misled into believing that Gamar was attending gym in order to have him pay for her lessons. The secret was soon revealed and, as expected, Gamar's father did not come around to her choice. However, he was reported to have secretly assisted at his daughter's performances later, when she became a renowned ballerina.

== Career ==
After graduating from the choreographic school in 1930, Gamar Almaszadeh began working at the Azerbaijan State Academic Opera and Ballet Theater. To meet her father's expectations, she also enrolled in a teachers' college. In 1932, she left for Moscow to continue her ballet education but soon returned to Baku after being chosen to perform a secondary role in Reinhold Glière's opera Shakh-Senem. In 1933, she was admitted to a professional ballet school in Saint Petersburg, where she had Maria Romanova-Ulanova (mother of the world-famous ballerina Galina Ulanova) as an instructor. In 1936, she finished her studies and once again returned to Baku. In 1937, she founded the Azerbaijan State Song and Dance Ensemble affiliated with the Azerbaijan State Philharmonic Society. Guided by composer Uzeyir Hajibeyov, she organized research expeditions to various parts of Azerbaijan to film and document folk dance performances and to enrich the repertoire of her ensemble as well as to propagate them on the big scene. In 1939, she taught her first choreography class and in 1940, made her first biggest performance in the lead role of Afrasiyab Badalbeyli's Giz Galasi ("The Maiden Tower"). She later became head of the School of Choreography (one of her students was prominent Azerbaijani ballerina Leyla Vakilova). During her career, she toured France, India, and Nepal. In 1970, she was invited to Baghdad by Iraq's Ministry of Culture to promote Iraqi folk dance culture and founded the Iraqi National Folklore Group. She retired from ballet in the 1950s, but remained an instructor at the School of Choreography until the late 1990s.

She married Afrasiyab Badalbeyli in 1931, however the marriage did not last very long. She later married a Russian whom she met in Moscow.

Almaszadeh died in Baku on 7 April 2006.

== Trivia ==
- Gamar Almaszadeh's younger sister Adila Almaszadeh also took ballet lessons and went off to St. Petersburg to study professional ballet. However, the asperity of the northern climate affected Adila's health (as she was extremely sensitive to climate change) leading to her death of tuberculosis.
- In the 1930s, a religious fanatic attempted to assassinate Gamar Almaszadeh on her way out of the theatre, but the bullet hit the spike heel of her shoe leaving Gamar unharmed.

== Plays directed by her ==
- "Tarlan" Ballet (1940) — Choreography School
- "Maiden Tower" Ballet (1940, 1958, 1977)
- "Gulshen" Ballet (1949, 1951, 1959)
- "Doctor Aybolit" Ballet (1949)
- "The Fountain of Bakhchisarai" Ballet (1951)
- "Seven Beauties" Ballet (1952)
- "Red Poppy" Ballet (1954)
- "Sleeping Beauty" Ballet (1955)
- "Laurencia" Ballet (1956)
- "Golden Key" Ballet (1957)
- "Harlequinade" Ballet (1959)
- "The Black Girl" Ballet (1965)
- "Harvest" Suite (1959)
- "Giselle" Ballet (1961)
- "Swan Lake" Ballet (1963)
- "Shur" Ballet (1968)
- "Don Quixote" Ballet (1973) — A work by L. Minkus
- "Festive Dance" Ballet (1973)

== Films ==
- "Dancing Cranes" (1935)
- "Evening Concert" (1948)
- "To My Beloved People" (1954)
- "Labor and Roses" (1962)
- "In the World of Legends" (1975)
- "Qəmər Almaszadə" (film)
- "Selections from the Golden Fund" (2001)
- "In Contact with Fire" (1972)
- "The Truth About My Republic" (1972)
- "The World is a Window: Qəmər Almaszadə" (broadcast on GünAz TV, 2008)

== Performances ==
- Tao Hoa — In R. Glière's "Red Poppy" Ballet (1931)
- Medora — In A. Adam's "Le Corsaire" Ballet (1936)
- Maria — In B. Asafyev's "The Fountain of Bakhchisarai" Ballet (1939)
- Gulyanag — In A. Badalbeyli's "Maiden Tower" Ballet (1940)
- Raymonda — In A. Glazunov's "Raymonda" Ballet (1943)
- Odette-Odile — In P. Tchaikovsky's "Swan Lake" Ballet (1943)
- Kitri — In L. Minkus's "Don Quixote" Ballet (1945)
- Masha — In P. Tchaikovsky's "The Nutcracker" Ballet (1949)
- Gulshen — In S. Hajibeyov's "Gulshen" Ballet (1950)
- Ayshe — In G. Garayev's "Seven Beauties" Ballet (1952)

== See also ==
- List of People's Artistes of the Azerbaijan SSR
