= Galib Mammadov =

Azerbaijani-Norwegian composer (born 1946)

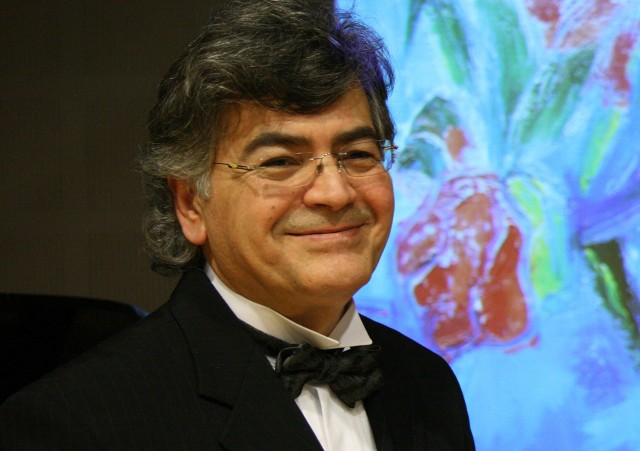
- Galib Mammadov
- Born: April 19, 1946 (age 79); Ganja, Azerbaijan
- Occupation: Composer

Galib Mammadov (born April 19, 1946) is an Azerbaijani-Norwegian composer. He is influenced by both Western and Eastern music traditions and composed a wide range of musical pieces for various instruments and orchestras.

== Biography ==
Galib Mammadov was born in Ganja, Azerbaijan which, at that time, belonged to the Soviet Union. He completed his secondary education at the music grammar school in Baku, Azerbaijan, and took at the same time lessons from the Azerbaijanian composer Fikret Amirov.

Mammadov then moved to Baku and went to the music college Asaf Zeynally, where he attended classes in music theory, composition and music literature, held by the composer Khayyam Mirzazade, the music historian R. Farhadova, and Z. Stelnic.

In 1969, Mammadov enrolled at the Azerbaijanian Republic Music Conservatory (Uzeir Hajibeyov). There he attended the composition class of the composer Gara Garayev.

While studying at the conservatory he composed preludes, variations, and sonata for piano, Sonatina for oboe and piano, scherzo for flute and piano and a string quartet.

He graduated in 1975 with Bayaties, a vocal cycle for soprano, bass and symphony orchestra, based on the text of the Azerbaijanian poet Vagif Bayat. It was first played by the Azerbaijanian symphony orchestra in 1975.

During the next years, Mammadov continued to develop his musical repertoire and composed many pieces in different genres while working as a teacher at the musical college in Ganja.

In the nineties, he became acquainted with the Norwegian writer and song text writer Eivind Skeie, and participated in many Norwegian-Azerbaijanian coproductions, such as “Landet vi kommer fra” ("The Country We Come From"), “Sommerland” ("Summerland"), “Oratorium Albanum” and "Askeladden" - music for Azerbaijanian puppet theatre, as well as a cantata for children, called “Drømmenes Fjell” ("The Mountain of Dreams").

In 2002, Mammadov moved to Norway to work as an organist in various churches. As a consequence, he has composed a number of hymns in recent years. The most well known is "La Den Brenne" (Let It Burn) which is sung in many different languages throughout the world. The ones that are included in the current Norwegian hymnal are “Aldri fikk vi se ditt ansikt” (NoS 874) and “Så stille vi går” (NoS 878), both texts are about grief and written by Eyvind Skeie.

Mammadov has also written several piano pieces. Many of these are inspired by the beauty of the Norwegian nature, such as Rafossen about the waterfall Rafoss, Våren er her about spring in Norway, Vals ("Waltz") and Høst på Frei, about autumn in Frei.

Mammadov's work is characterized by a great variety of style, genre, and musical influences. Being able to play quite a number of instruments himself, he composes works for many different instruments, orchestras and vocal sounds.

Much of his inspiration comes from Azerbaijan, where many different music traditions meet – the classical European and Russian music traditions, as well as Azerbaijanian folk music.

== List of Compositions ==
- (1971) Preludes, Variations and Sonata for f/no'
- (1972) Sonatina for Oboe & f/no
- (1973) Scherzo for Flute & f/no
- (1974) Allegro for String Quartet
- (1975) Bayaties - vocal cycle for soprano, bass and symphony orchestra
- (1975) Parvana and Uzeir Dastani - for strings
- (1979) Cleyst Sonata - for f/no
- (1981) Miniatures - for chamber orchestra
- (1983) Nushaba and Alexsander - a symphonic poem by Azeri writer Nizami Ganjavi
- (1983) Pieces for Children - for f/no
- (1984) Children's Album - for orchestra
- (1984) Writings of Nine Azerbaijani Mugams
- (1985) The Treasure of Secrets - ballet for large symphony orchestra, based on Nizami Ganjavi's poem.
- (1987) Two Prayers - for piano, voice and recorder/Indian flute.
- (1988) Waltz for Chamber Orchestra
- (1992) The Psalms of David - vocal cycle for mezzo-soprano, bass and chamber orchestra
- (1994) Psalms Nos. 52 & 39 - for chorus a cappella
- (1997) Odoglan - puppetry theater
- (1997-1999) Music for film Harai Xojali
- (1997-1999) Music for theatre Molla Nesreddin, Javad Khan.
- (1999) Allegro Albana - allegro for chamber orchestra.
- (2000) Oratorium Albanum - for symphony orchestra, chorus and organ.
- (2002) La Den Brenne
- (2004) We Never Know - romance after Emily Dickinson.
- (2005) Iskendername - ballet after Nizami Ganjavi.

== Discography ==
- Landet vi kommer fra (The Country we come from)]
- My help comes from the Lord
- Ten songs: Sommerlandet, text by Eyvind Skeie]
- Min tanke går til Betlehem
- Seven pieces for piano solo
- 2 songs in Norwegian psalm-book
