= Mursal Garayev =

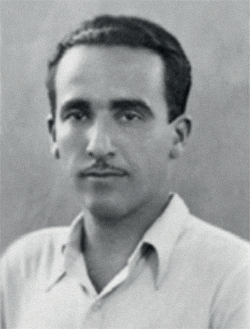
- Garayev in the 1940s
- Born: Mürsəl Əbülfəz oğlu Qarayev; 4 November 1919; Fatmai, Baku Uyezd, Azerbaijan Democratic Republic
- Died: 26 September 1975 (aged 55); Baku, Azerbaijan SSR, USSR
- Citizenship: Azerbaijan Democratic Republic; Soviet Union
- Education: Azerbaijan Medical Institute
- Occupation: Surgeon
- Medical career
- Awards: Order of the Red Star Medal "For the Defence of the Caucasus" Medal "For the Victory over Germany in the Great Patriotic War 1941–1945" Jubilee Medal "50 Years of the Armed Forces of the USSR" Medal "For Battle Merit" Soviet Guards badge

Mursal Garayev (Azerbaijani: Mürsəl Qarayev; 4 November 1919 – 26 September 1975) was a Soviet surgeon, doctor of sciences in medicine, chief surgeon of the Ministry of Healthcare of the Azerbaijan SSR.

== Biography ==
Mursal Garayev was born on 4 November 4, 1919 in Fatmai to Abulfaz Garayev, a pediatrician and head of the pediatric department of the Azerbaijan Medical Institute, and poet Sona Akhundova-Garayeva. In 1938, after graduating from high school number 23 in Baku, he entered the Azerbaijan Medical Institute and in 1942 graduated from the faculty of treatment and prevention. While he was still in his final year at the institute, he began his surgical career as a subordinator in the Department of Hospital Surgery.

After Garayev graduated from the institute, on 25 August 1942, he was conscripted into the Soviet Army. He was an intern surgeon at the selection center of the 65th special moto-shooter brigade of the Caucasus Front. After being wounded and treated for a while, he served as a surgeon in the 482th Medical Battalion in the Army from August 1943 to October 1945. He was on the front lines during the war. He had served doctor-surgeon's position in the special shooting guards battalion of the 4th brigade of the 10th guards corps. Garayev took an active part in the battles for Novorossiysk, Mozdok, Grozny, Georgiyevsk and Krasnodar and was the chief doctor of the military confrontation in the Kursk region battles. After being wounded again in the battles around Budapest, he was demobilized from the army as a medical service captain and was awarded several orders, medals and other awards.

Garayev was a member of the Society of Veterans of the Great Patriotic War. After being demobilized from the army in 1945, he was accepted as an intern at the Faculty of Surgery of the Azerbaijan Medical Institute, and in April 1946 was appointed Assistant to the Department. In addition to active pedagogical work, he was also interested in science and worked on his thesis. Completed his thesis on "Complex treatment of purulent pleurisy with long-term use of vacuum-therapy", defended in April 1953.

Garayev has often performed with scientific articles at both national and international surgical conferences and symposiums. He was the author of up to 60 scientific articles and in 1957 was elected associate professor of the Department of "Faculty Surgery" at the Azerbaijan Medical Institute.

In order to assist the population of rural areas of Azerbaijan, Garayev repeatedly participated in medical brigades, in addition to his pedagogical activity in the department he served as chief surgeon of the Baku region in 1959 and chief surgeon of the Ministry of Healthcare of the Azerbaijan SSR in 1961–1964. He was repeatedly awarded with gratitude and awards from the management of the Azerbaijan Medical Institute and the Ministry of Healthcare.

In addition to active surgical and pedagogical activity in the clinic, Garayev continued his scientific activity and defended his doctoral thesis in 1971 "Treatment of portal hypertension". In order to convey the wide-ranging military field surgery experience he gained during the Great Patriotic War, he was appointed Associate Professor at the Department of Traumatology, Orthopedics and Military Surgery at the Institute of Medicine on May 14, 1975.

Garayev, with more than 5,000 surgeries, died on 26 September 1975 in Baku.

== Memorial ==
On 4 November 2019, the 100th anniversary of Garayev's birth was celebrated at Azerbaijan Medical University.

== Awards ==
- Order of the Red Star
- Medal "For the Defence of the Caucasus"
- Medal "For the Victory over Germany in the Great Patriotic War 1941–1945"
- Medal "For Battle Merit"
- Jubilee Medal "50 Years of the Armed Forces of the USSR"
- Soviet Guards Badge

== See also ==
- Gara Garayev
