= Madina Aliyeva =

Azerbaijani ballerina and choreographer (born 1965)

- Mədinə Vaqif qızı Əliyeva
- Born: Madina Vagif gizi Aliyeva; 4 May 1965 (age 61); Baku, Azerbaijan Soviet Socialist Republic
- Occupations: Ballerina, ballet master, choreographer
- Awards: Honored Artist of the Republic of Azerbaijan; People's Artist of Azerbaijan

Madina Vagif gizi Aliyeva (Azerbaijani: Mədinə Vaqif qızı Əliyeva) is an Azerbaijani ballerina, choreographer, ballet-master known for dancing the role of the maiden in a staging of the Maiden Tower ballet to celebrate the 54th anniversary of the United Nations. Aliyeva was also made a Honored Artist of the Republic of Azerbaijan in 1993 and a People's Artist of Azerbaijan in 2002.

== Biography ==
Madina Aliyeva was born on 4 May 1965, in Baku.

To commemorate the 54th anniversary of the United Nations in 1999, a revival of Afrasiyab Badalbeyli's ballet Maiden Tower was restaged with financial support from various oil companies. Aliyeva performed the role of the maiden, and partnered with Gulaghasi Mirzoyev. The ballet had been rewritten by Badalbeyli's nephew Farhad Badalbeyli and Yulana Alikishizade and premiered at the Azerbaijan State Academic Opera and Ballet Theater on 24 October 1999.

In 2012, she directed the dance at the opera Così fan tutte ("Thus Do They All, or The School for Lovers") by Wolfgang Amadeus Mozart, at the Azerbaijan State Academic Opera and Ballet Theater. Two years later, Aliyeva choreographed the ballet One Thousand and One Nights by Fikret Amirov, which was staged in Minsk. In 2025, she was choreographer for the opera Asli and Kerem staged at the Baku Music Academy's Opera Studio to celebrate the 140th anniversary of the birth of the opera's writer, Uzeyir Hajibeyov. The following year, Aliyeva collaborated Anar Mikayilov to direct the choreography in a staging of Puccini's opera Turandot by the Azerbaijan State Academic Opera and Ballet Theater. The production's premiere was held at the Heydar Aliyev Palace on 25 October 2026.

== Awards ==
On 26 February 1993, Aliyeva was conferred as an Honored Artist of the Republic of Azerbaijan for Achievements in the Performing Arts and as a People's Artist of Azerbaijan on 24 December 2002.
