= Symphony No. 3 (Garayev) =

Gara Garayev's Symphony No. 3 was composed in 1964. It was the last of the composer's three numbered symphonies and it marks a development from his two previous contributions to the genre, composed in the mid-1940s during his studies in the Leningrad Conservatory under Dmitri Shostakovich. It was one of the first serial symphonies composed in the Soviet Union, fusing the twelve-tone technique with Azerbaijani folk music influences in the ashug tradition in the frame of a classical structure, attempting to find to new ways of artistic expression, new principles of form and construction, and, most notably, new means of expressive musical language and wanting to prove that strictly following the twelve-tone technique it is possible to write nationalistic music, and not simply nationalistic, but specifically ashug according to the composer.

The symphony is scored for a chamber orchestra and it lasts c. 25 minutes, consisting of four movements:

1. Allegro moderato
2. Allegro vivace
3. Andante
4. Allegro

== Recordings ==
- Moscow Chamber Orchestra — Rudolf Barshai. Melodiya, 1966
- Leningrad Conservatory Chamber Orchestra — Yuri Aliev. Melodiya, 1978
- Russian Philharmonic — Dmitry Yablonsky. Naxos, 2008
