= Sona Akhundova-Garayeva =

Azerbaijani poet (1898–1971)

- Sona Iskander gizi Akhundova-Garayeva
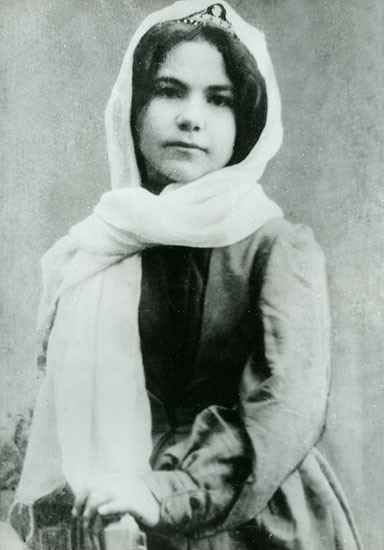
- Born: 16 October 1898; Baku, Azerbaijan
- Died: 19 October 1971 (aged 73)
- Occupation: Poet
- Spouse: Abulfaz Garayev
- Children: Gara Garayev, Mursal Garayev
- Writing career
- Notable work: "Vatan"

Sona Iskander gizi Akhundova-Garayeva (Azerbaijani: Sona xanım İsgəndər bəy qızı Axundov; 16 October 1898 – 19 October 1971) was an Azerbaijani poet and one of the first women in Azerbaijan to receive higher education. She was a mother of composer Gara Garayev and doctor Mursal Garayev.

== Early life and education ==
Sona Iskander gizi Akhundova was born on 16 October 1898 in Baku. Her father was Iskander Mirza Abdulhuseyn bey oglu Akhundov, a graduate of the University of Krakow-Jagiellonian, and her mother was Zuleykha Bayramalibeyova, one of the educated and enlightened women of her time.

At the age of 13 Akhundova's parents sent her to a girls’ school under the Baku Municipality. After graduating from this school, she continued her education at the Baku branch of St. Nina School. Later Akhundova studied piano music.

Akhundova showed interest in poetry when she was still in school. With the help of Shafiqa Khanum, she found and read poems of Mirza Alakbar Sabir and was also aware of satirical poems, articles, and caricatures published in the magazine "Molla Nasreddin".

Sona Akhundova-Garayeva died on 19 October 1971.

== Work ==
One of the most famous of Akhundova's poems “Vatan” was included in the book "Ashugs and Poets of Azerbaijan" published in 1974.

Reviews about Sona Khanum's poems were published in the beginning of the last century in "Sada", "Ishik", "Kaspi", "Zaqafqazskaya rech" and other newspapers. Akhundova cooperated with the first women's newspaper Ishig and regularly published her poems there.

== Personal life ==
Akhundova married Abulfaz Garayev, a prominent doctor and honored scientist, and they had two sons – Gara and Mursal Garayevs. Gara Garayev became a world-known composer, while Mursal Garayev – a prominent doctor.

== Legacy ==
On 16 October 2018, the Azerbaijan Writers's Union presented a book, “Sona Akhundova-Garayeva. A Memorial Book” dedicated to the 120th anniversary of Akhundova-Garayeva at the House-Museum of Gara Garayev . The book is written in three languages: Azerbaijani, English and Russian.
