= Abulfaz Garayev (pediatrician) =

Azerbaijani pediatrician

Abulfaz Garayev Əbülfəz Qarayev
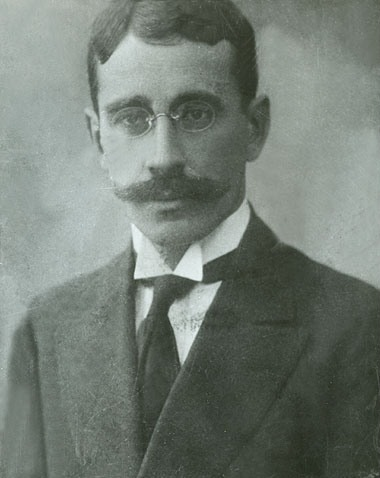
- Abulfaz Garayev in 1916
- Born: Əbülfəz Fərəc oğlu Qarayev; April 20, 1885
- Died: October 24, 1952 (aged 67)
- Occupations: Scientist, physician
- Medical career
- Profession: Pediatrician
- Awards: Order of the Red Banner of Labour

Abulfaz Faraj oghlu Garayev (Azerbaijani: Əbülfəz Fərəc oğlu Qarayev; April 20, 1885, in Baku – October 24, 1952), also spelled as Abulfaz Qarayev, was the first Azerbaijani pediatrician, honored scientist of Azerbaijan.

== Biography ==
Abulfaz Faraj oghlu Garayev was born on April 20, 1885, in Baku. He entered the Baku Gymnasium in 1896 and graduated in 1907. After graduating from the gymnasium, he entered the Medical Faculty of Novorossiysk University in Odessa. Abulfaz Garayev graduated from university in 1912 with an honors diploma and was kept at the university for being a well-educated graduate. After working for two years at the Children's Diseases Clinic, Abulfaz Garayev returned to Baku in 1915. The first Azerbaijani pediatrician, Abulfaz Garayev, was the founder of the mother and child health protection system in Azerbaijan. He was one of the organizers of the Republic Children's Clinical Hospital.

From 1930 until his death, the practical, scientific, and pedagogical activity of Abulfaz Garayev was connected with Azerbaijan State Medical Institute named after Nariman Narimanov. In the same year, he became assistant to the Pediatric Department of the Medical Institute and was elected associate professor in 1931, and professor and head of the department in 1939. He defended his doctoral dissertation in 1938. Most of his research was devoted to intestinal infections. He also learned the etiology, pathogenesis, and treatment methods for blood diseases.

From 1938, Abulfaz Garayev worked as the head of the Azerbaijan Pediatric Association until the end of his life. He was the chairman of the Scientific-Medical Council of the Ministry of Healthcare of the Azerbaijan SSR and was a member of the Council of Treatment-Prophylaxis Aid for Children. The pediatrics faculty of the Azerbaijan State Medical Institute was established with his initiative, leadership, and direct participation. Most of the educated professionals during his pedagogical activity are leading pediatricians today.

Abulfaz Faraj oghlu Garayev died on October 24, 1952. The Children's Clinical Hospital No. 2 is named after him.

== Family ==
After returning from Odessa to Baku, the doctor got acquainted with his spouse, Sona khanum Akhundova. Sona khanum Akhundova was the daughter of Iskender bey Akhundov, a prominent lawyer in Azerbaijan. Sona's parents were intellectual people, and despite harsh Sharia rules, they had given their daughters a good education. Sona Khanum was trained at the St. Nina Gymnasium, the branch of the Saint Petersburg Smolny Institute in Baku, as well as the piano specialty at the Baku Musical School under the Russian Music Society.

Abulfaz Garayev and Sona Khanum had two sons. They were world-renowned Azerbaijani composer Gara Garayev, and Mursal Garayev, a surgeon of the Ministry of Healthcare of Azerbaijan SSR. The eldest son of Mursal Garayev, Jahangir Garayev (1951–2013), was a prominent pianist and jazz composer. His youngest son, Abulfas Garayev was appointed the Minister of Culture of the Republic of Azerbaijan in 2018.

== Awards ==
Abulfaz Garayev received the titles of "Honored Doctor", and "Honored Scientist" in 1940. He was awarded with two Orders of the Red Banner of Labour and medals.
