= Faraj Garayev =

Azerbaijani composer (born 1943)

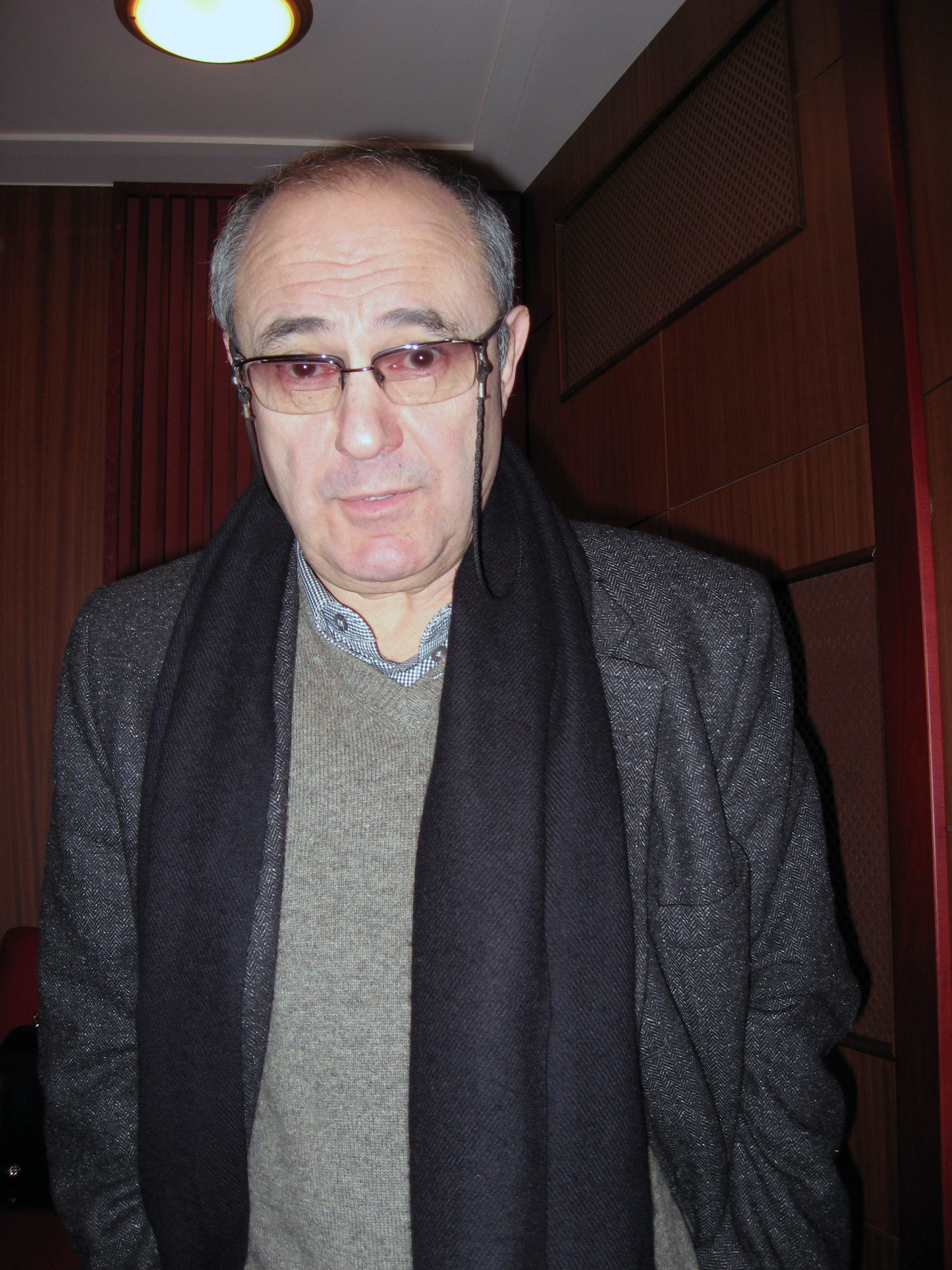
- Faraj Garayev

Background information
- Born: December 19, 1943 (age 81)
- Origin: Baku, Azerbaijan
- Occupation: Composer
- Website: http://www.karaev.net/

Faraj Gara oglu Garayev (Azerbaijani: Fərəc Qara oğlu Qarayev); December 19, 1943 in Baku) is an Azerbaijani composer, music instructor, professor, son of the prominent Azerbaijani composer Gara Garayev and one of the leading composers of post-Soviet period.

In 1966, Garayev graduated from the Azerbaijan State Conservatoire, specialising in music composition, taught by his father Gara Garayev. In 1971, he finished his post-graduate studies. From 1966 to 2003, he taught composition, instrumentation and polyphony at the Azerbaijan State Conservatoire and from 1994 he has been a professor there. From 1991, he has been living in Baku and Moscow. In 1991, he became professor of the faculty of music theory at the Moscow State Conservatoire. In 2003, he became professor of composition, in the faculty of the Kazan State Conservatoire. From 1994 to 1996, Faraj Garayev was vice-president of the Moscow Association of Modern Music and from 1995, he has been the president of the Yeni Musiqi Union of Modern Music established in Baku. Faraj Garayev was art director of BaKaRa-ENSEMBLE (Baku) in 1980-1994. In 1991-1992, he was scholar of A.Krupp cultural Foundation (Essen, Germany).

== Creativity ==
Compositions by Garayev are performed at festivals and concerts in the CIS countries, Europe, South America, the USA and Japan. Conductors such as Gennady Rozhdestvensky, Vassily Sinaisky, Alexander Lazarev, Maxim Shostakovich (the USSR, Russia), Rauf Abdullayev (Azerbaijan), Ingo Metzmacher (Germany), Reinbert de Leeuw and Ed Spanjaard (Netherlands), Ensemble of soloists of the Orchestra of the Bolshoi Theatre (Moscow), “Studio of new music” (Moscow), Ensemble Modern (Frankfurt, Germany), Nieuw Ensemble and Schoenberg Ensemble (Amsterdam, Netherlands), Quatuor Danel (France), Continuum (New York City, USA) and others are among performers of his compositions.
