= Seven Beauties (ballet) =

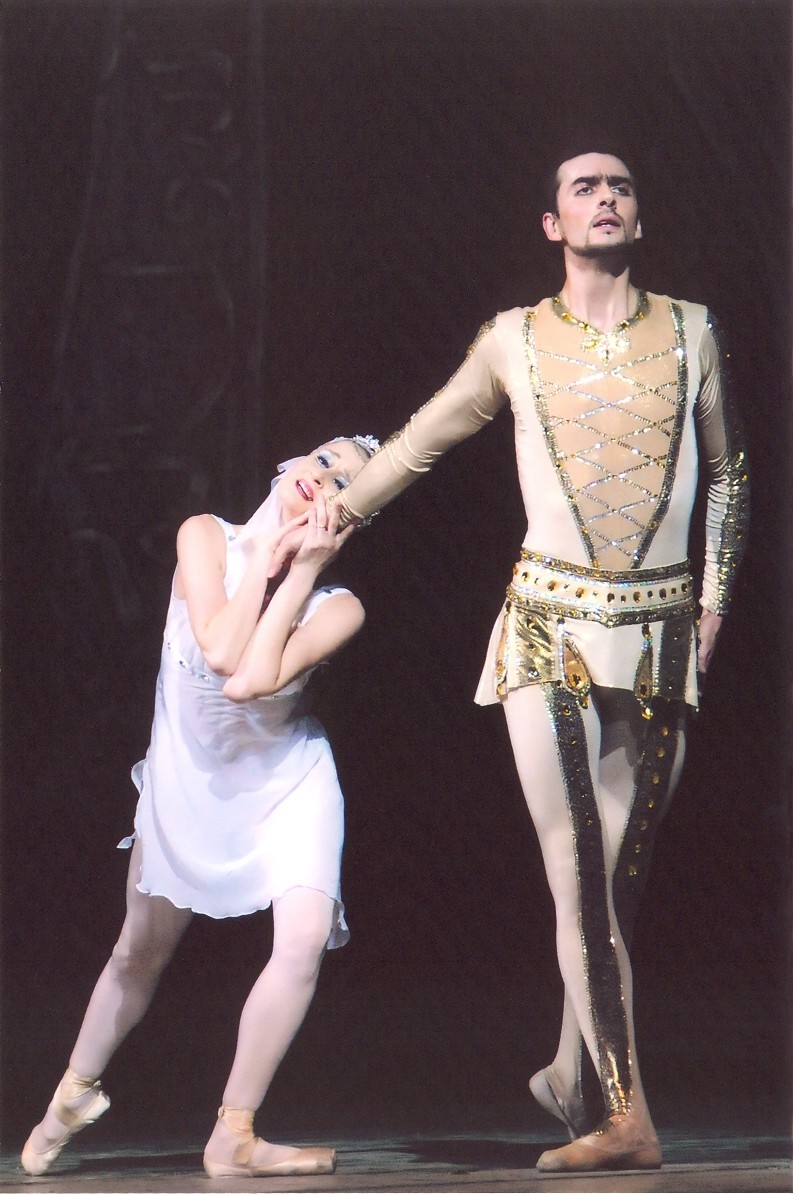
- Performance of Seven Beauties (2010)
- Choreographer: P. A. Gusev
- Music: Gara Garayev
- Libretto: Ismayil Hidayatzadeh; Yuri Slonimsky; Sabit Rahman
- Based on: Seven Beauties poem by Nizami Ganjavi
- Premiere: 1952; Azerbaijan State Academic Opera and Ballet Theater, Baku

Seven Beauties (Azerbaijani: Yeddi gözəl) is a ballet composed by Azerbaijani composer Gara Garayev in 1947–48 to mark the 800th anniversary of the birth of Nizami Ganjavi. Set in the 12th century, the libretto, written by I. Hidayetzade, Yuri Slonimsky and Sabit Rahman, is based on motifs from Ganjavi's romantic epic poem Haft Peykar, written in 1197.

== Background ==
One of Ganjavi's "long narrative poems" was the inspiration for a symphonic suite The Seven Beauties of 1949, which was reworked into a full-length ballet. The ballet’s confections contained influence from Soviet-Armenian composer Aram Khachaturian.

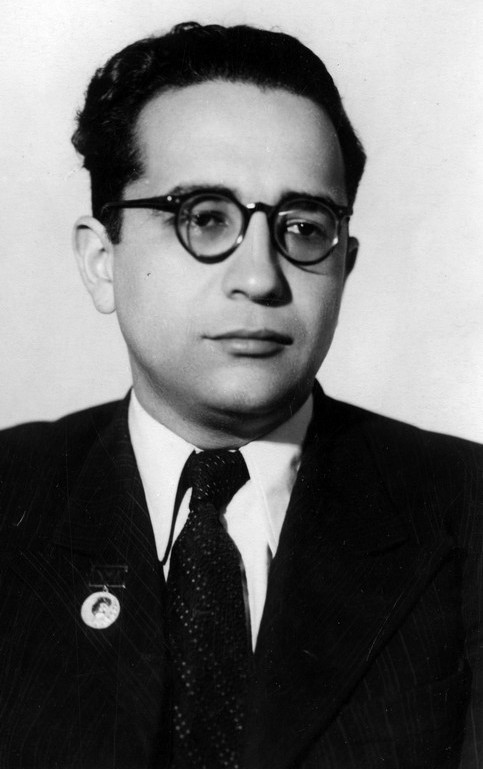
Gara Garayev, composer of the ballet

The ballet premiered on November 7, 1952, in the Azerbaijan State Academic Opera and Ballet Theater in Baku. Azerbaijani folk instruments were used in orchestration of the ballet, which give it a national tint.

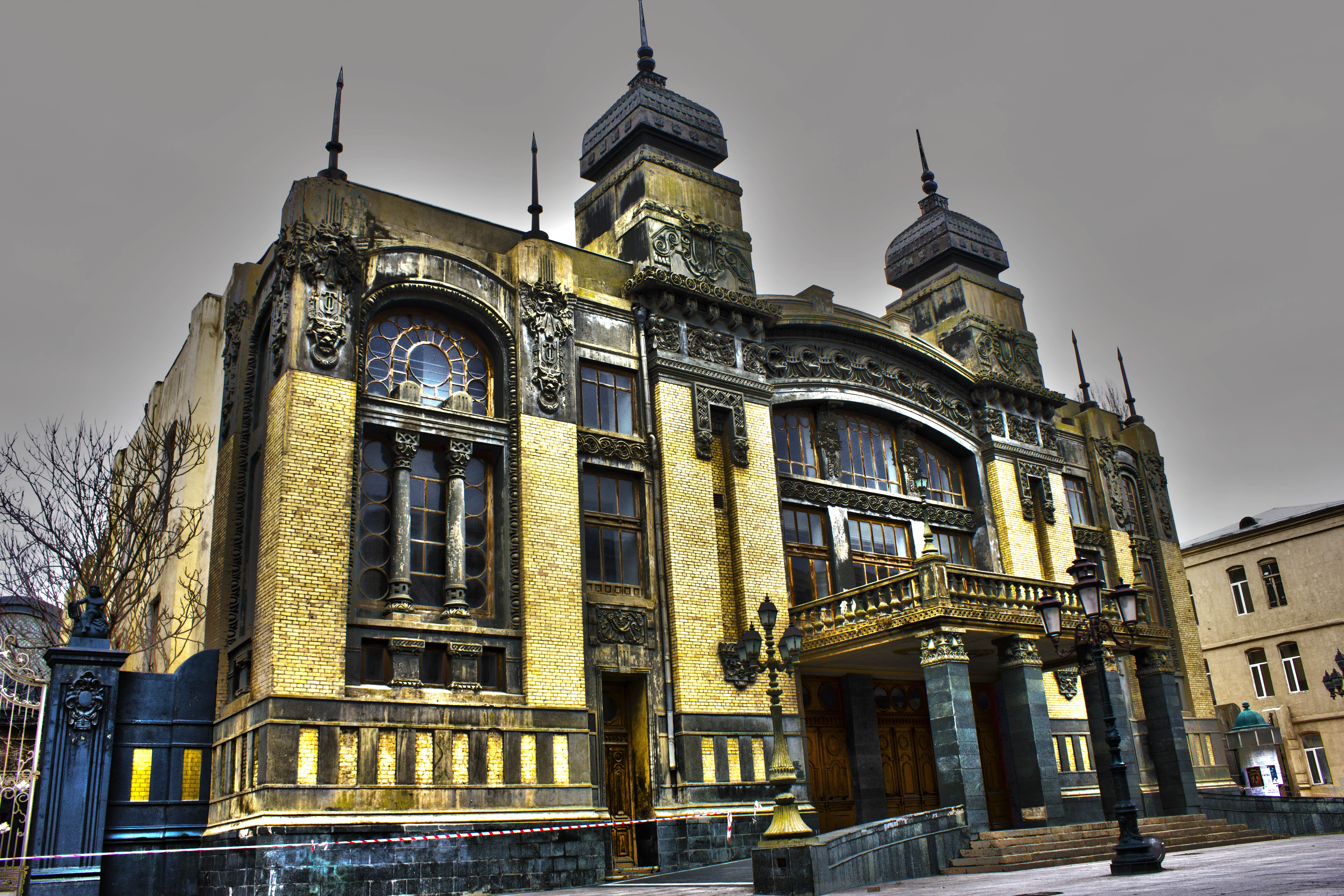
The Azerbaijan State Academic Opera and Ballet Theater in Baku, where the first staging of the ballet was held

In 2008, a new staging of the ballet was held on the stage of the Azerbaijan State Opera and Ballet Theater. Russian choreographer Vasiliy Medvedev became its chief ballet master. Yana Temiz – a writer from Turkey wrote a new libretto for the staging. Elshad Bagirov, who worked at the Bolshoi Theatre and was a conductor at the Opera and Ballet Theater of Istanbul, became the manager and conductor of the staging. Artist of the Bolshoi Theater Dmitriy Cherbadji worked on decorations and Tahir Salahov on costumes.

On 13 October 2014, the ballet premiered in the United States at the Civic Theatre in San Diego, California before an audience of 3,000.

== Characters ==
- Manzar
- Aysha
- Bahram Shah
- Vizier
- Seven beauties:
  - Indian
  - Byzantine
  - Khorezmian
  - Slav
  - Maghrebian
  - Chinese
  - Persian
- Head of a guard
- Commanders
- Hermit
- Cooper, silk maker
- Potter
- Ropemaker
- Gunsmith
- Blacksmith
- Shoemaker
- Wheelwright
- Jesters
- A palace girl

== Synopsis ==
External videos
- Screening of the ballet - Part 1
- Screening of the ballet - Part 2
- Screening of the ballet - Part 3
- Screening of the ballet - Part 4
- Screening of the ballet - Part 5
- Screening of the ballet - Part 6
- Screening of the ballet - Part 7
- Screening of the ballet - Part 8
- Screening of the ballet - Part 9
- Screening of the ballet - Part 10
- Screening of the ballet - Part 11

A storm catches Bahram Shah during a hunt. While looking for a shelter in ruins of an old castle, he meets a hermit, who shows him images of seven beauties from different countries. It seems to Bahram that the beauties come to life and perform amazing dances for him. At daybreak the beauties disappear. Bahram leaves the palace and goes home. On the road he sees a stately youngster Manzar and his sister Aysha competing in a bow. Bahram calls Manzar to compete. Then they exchange gifts according to custom. Bahram gives Manzar a belt, and he gives him a sword. After Manzar goes away, Bahram makes Aysha a declaration of love. Aysha also confesses to the hunter. And when servants and a vizier come for lost Bahram, Aysha and Manzar know that this young hunter is none other than the Shah. Vizier informs him about the Khazars' invasion.

Bahram gives authority to the vizier and takes the field. But the vizier, who has a plan about seizure of power, charges two of his closes to disguise themselves in Khazars' costume, to catch up and kill the Shah. A gloomy demonstration is observed on the square and population begs for mercy. Captivated girls follow the defaulters. Fierce servants of the Shah pounce on goods on stores, plunder and demolish everything which fall into their hands, after which the population runs away. At that time the vizier enjoys the power, descends to the underground treasury where he wears splendid clothes. He dreams of the day when he will be Shah. At that time a killer comes and says that they couldn't attempt on the Shah's life. Then the sound of a horn are heard. Returning to the capital Bahram, who knows about the conspiracy, wants a reprisal. But he can't leave the palace because of the vizier's guards. Then Manzar calls armed craftsmen for help. At that time, a solemn demonstration led by the vizier goes out from the palace. He gives Bahram symbols of power. Manzar knows about the vizier's perfidy, but the vizier kills close before the Shah's eyes, to show his loyalty to the Shah and that allegedly he was the organizer of the conspiracy. Guards disarm the population, tie up craftsmen and Manzar and imprison them.

Knowing about Manzar's and the craftsmen's imprisonment, Aysha runs to the palace and begs the Shah, who feasts at that time, to set them free. The Shah releases only Manzar in memory of their former friendship. Disturbed by Bahram's act that didn't punish the vizier and release the craftsmen, Manzar drops the belt, presented by the Shah, on the ground. This act outrages the Shah and he orders Manzar's execution. But he runs away. The vizier wants to distract the Shah. He shows him silk textile, on which seven beauties are portrayed. Shah remembers that night spent in ruins of the palace and seven beauties seem to him again. The Shah forgets about vital problems, what the vizier tries to obtain to seize the power. He goes to a village with his guards where Manzar takes cover. Knowing that peasants don't want to give up Manzar, the vizier orders to trample down the peasants' crops. The peasants appeal to the Shah. But the Shah thinks only about Aysha, whom he cannot forget. But Aysha refuses Bahram's love, who dooms the population to starvation. Bahram orders the vizier to burn the village. Suddenly seven young peasants and craftsmen appear while the vizier looks at the fire. They commit revenge and the vizier dies.

Bahram wants to forget Aysha. That is why he returns to the palace, seeking oblivion in seven beauties. But then a thunderclap is heard and the walls of the palace are parted. Seven messengers of the population appear and give the Shah a crook and cloak showing him that he has to abdicate and leave the country. Suddenly Aysha appears, saying the Shah that she loves not him, but a hunter and is ready to go with him if he abdicates. Wrathful Bahram strikes the girl with a fatal blow of the sword. The population bids farewell to Aysha and drive Bahram away.

== See also ==
- List of historical ballet characters
- Azerbaijani ballet
