= The Path of Thunder (ballet) =

Ballet

- Choreographer: Konstantin Sergeyev
- Music: Gara Garayev
- Libretto: Yuri Slonimsky
- Based on: The Path of Thunder novel by Peter Abrahams
- Premiere: 4 January 1958; Mariinsky Theatre, Saint Petersburg
- Design: V. Dorer

The Path of Thunder is a ballet in three acts with libretto by Yuri Slonimsky, music by Gara Garayev and choreography by Konstantin Sergeyev. Inspired by the 1948 eponymous novel of Peter Abrahams, the ballet tells the story of a forbidden love between a black teacher and a white girl in 1940s Apartheid South Africa. The ballet premiered at the Mariinsky Theatre (called S. M. Kirov Leningrad State Academic Theatre of Opera and Ballet at the time) in Saint Petersburg (Leningrad at that time). Garayev used a soft, melodic music, which turns lyrical and passionate in the love scene, while the conflict with the girl's father and the other whites is accompanied by harsh, dissonant music. The lovers die in the course of conflict, but the people rise up against the racial prejudices towards them, leading themselves to the Path of Thunder, the way of liberation.

Many other versions of the ballet have been staged throughout the former Soviet Union, and in 1967 it won the Lenin Prize.

== See also ==
- List of ballets by title
