= Gara Garayev =

Azerbaijani composer (1918–1982)

- Qara Qarayev
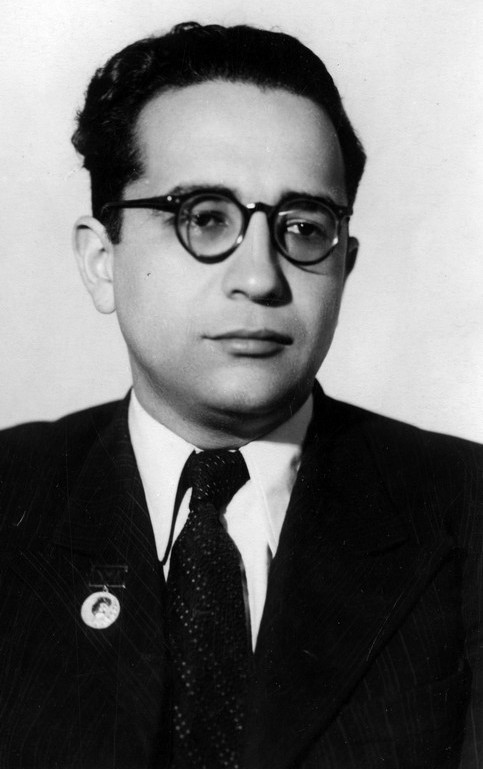
- Garayev in 1948
- Born: February 5, 1918; Baku, Transcaucasian Democratic Federative Republic (present-day Azerbaijan)
- Died: May 13, 1982 (aged 64); Moscow, Russian SFSR, Soviet Union
- Occupations: Composer, conductor
- Years active: 1938–1982

Gara Abulfaz oghlu Garayev (Note: Azerbaijani: Qara Əbülfəz oğlu Qarayev; Russian: Кара Абульфаз оглы Караев, romanized: Kara Abulfaz ogly Karayev) (February 5, 1918 – May 13, 1982) was a prominent Soviet Azerbaijani composer. Garayev wrote nearly 110 musical pieces, including ballets, operas, symphonic and chamber pieces, solos for piano, cantatas, songs, and marches, and rose to prominence not only in the Azerbaijan SSR, but also in the rest of the Soviet Union and worldwide.

== Early life ==
Garayev was born into a family of pediatricians, which was famous in Baku. His mother, Sona, was among the first graduates of the Baku-based school of the Russian Music Society. Garayev's younger brother, Mursal, became a surgeon and Doctor of Medicine.

In 1926, at the age of eight, Gara Garayev first entered the junior music school at the Azerbaijan State Conservatoire, currently known as the Baku Music Academy. Due to his musical talents, Garayev was allowed to enroll simultaneously in two faculties at the Azerbaijan State Conservatoire in 1933. Among his teachers were Georgi Sharoyev, Leonid Rudolf, and Uzeyir Hajibeyov. In 1937, Garayev joined the Union of Composers of Azerbaijan SSR.

== Career ==
In 1938, at the age of twenty, Garayev composed his first musical piece, a cantata "The Song of the Heart" to the poem by Rasul Rza. It was performed in Moscow's Bolshoi Theater in the presence of Joseph Stalin in the same year. Garayev conducted his cantata during the Decade of Azerbaijani Art festival in the Bolshoi Theater, an event also attended by Stalin. In the same year, Garayev moved to the Moscow State Conservatoire, where he became a student and a good friend of Dmitri Shostakovich.

In 1941 Garayev returned to Baku to teach at Azerbaijan State Philharmonic Society. In 1945, both he and Jovdat Hajiyev wrote the Motherland ("Vətən") opera, for which they were awarded a prestigious Stalin Prize. In 1948, at the age of 30, Garayev was again awarded this prize for his symphonic poem Leyli and Majnun, based on the same-titled famous work of Nizami Ganjavi. Upon the death of Uzeyir Hajibeyov in 1948, Garayev became the Chair of the Union of Composers of Azerbaijan SSR and the rector of the Azerbaijan State Conservatoire. In this latter position, Garayev retained Uzeyir Hajibeyov's traditional emphasis on Azerbaijani folk music in teaching, and also promoted contemporary genres, such as jazz in Azerbaijani music. In 1948 Garayev also became the delegate to the First National USSR Congress of Soviet Composers. In the same year Garayev also headed the Music Department at the Azerbaijan Architecture and Art Institute.

In 1952, under the direction of the choreographer P. A. Gusev, Garayev's Seven Beauties ballet was staged at the Azerbaijani Theater of Opera and Ballet. Based on Nizami Ganjavi's famous poem, Seven Beauties ("Yeddi gözəl") opened a new chapter in the history of classical music of Azerbaijan. The ballet’s confections contained influence from Soviet-Armenian composer Aram Khachaturian. Garayev's only other ballet, Path of Thunder ("İldırımlı yollarla"), staged in 1958, was dedicated to racial conflicts in South Africa. In the same year, Garayev also wrote the score for the documentary film A Story About the Oil Workers of the Caspian Sea, directed by Roman Karmen and set at the Oil Rocks.

During his teaching career at the Azerbaijan State Conservatoire, Garayev tutored a number of prominent Azerbaijani musicians and composers, including Galib Mammadov, Arif Malikov, Khayyam Mirzazade and Ismayil Hajibeyov among others. Garayev's son, Faraj (born 1943), also became his student and went on to compose single-act ballets such as Shadows of Qobustan ("Qobustanın kölgələri") and Kaleidoscope, and later led the musical avant-garde movement in Azerbaijan.

During the Cold War in June 1961, Garayev and Tikhon Khrennikov were the only two Soviet composers who attended the first International Los Angeles Music Festival held at UCLA. The festival programmed works by fifteen composers from around the world, including Arnold Schoenberg and Igor Stravinsky. On June 11, Franz Waxman conducted the Festival Symphony Orchestra with a suite from Garayev's Path of Thunder.

In 1962 Garayev became a member of the Supreme Soviet of the USSR and visited the United States, Ethiopia, and Lebanon. In 1972 he visited Poland.

== Later life ==
Garayev suffered from heart disease, which prevented him from attending his own 60th jubilee celebration held in Baku, where he was awarded the title of the Hero of Socialist Labor. Garayev spent the last five years of his life in Moscow, away from the public, although his love for Baku remained strong and was reflected in his writing:

To me, Baku is the most beautiful city in the world. Every morning, when the city wakes whether it be to the sun or the rain and fog, every morning my city sings. Baku is meant for art. It gives me so much pleasure to write about this city no matter if you write music, verse or paint images.

Garayev died on May 13, 1982, in Moscow at the age of 64. His body was flown to Baku and buried at the Alley of Honor.

== Appraisals ==
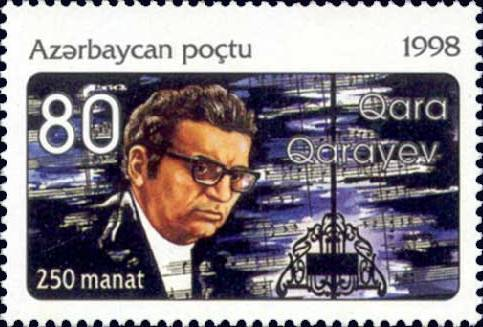
Azerbaijani postage stamp featuring Gara Garayev, 1998

- Dmitri Shostakovich, Russian composer and Garayev's mentor:

Garayev has a great and brilliant talent which is highly developed. He is extremely knowledgeable about instrumentation, polyphony and the other components that make up music. He surely has a great future.

- Niyazi, Azerbaijani conductor and composer:

I've been one who has been privileged in being able to reveal the private and mysterious ideas of Gara Garayev to the audience. So I know the excitement the audience feels while listening to Garayev's music. It can't be characterized as either entertainment or relaxation. Rather, it exposes all the fire in one's heart and compels one to act. I'm grateful that I've had the chance to be in touch with his music and to be the first one to interpret most of his works.

- Tahir Salahov, Azerbaijani painter:

I must say that I indeed have been fortunate, not only because I had the chance to meet such a talented musical personality but because I got to know him through his music. This is the only way to get deep inside an artist-through music. Everything trivial and insignificant - the things one pays attention to during mundane, everyday meetings - disappears. Only the essence of a man is left.

- Tikhon Khrennikov, Russian composer:

Garayev has that rare ability to stay true to himself and not to imitate anyone. He maintains his own individuality even while changing with the times, regardless of genre.

- Rodion Shchedrin, Russian composer:

There was almost no limit to Garayev's scope of knowledge in all genres of music. In 1963, we traveled together to America. It amazed me how Garayev knew so many things about so many different genres of music. For example, I'd have to admit to being a bit elitist when it comes to jazz. But I couldn't hide my admiration when he demonstrated competency in this field as well. He mentioned several names, compared one tendency in jazz to another and talked about things I had never heard of.

- Fikret Amirov, Azerbaijani composer:

Garayev's music is one of the greatest columns in the museum of Azerbaijani music. His role in making Azerbaijan's music known worldwide is immense.

- Khayyam Mirzazade, Azerbaijani composer and Garayev's student:

As a rule, Garayev would turn his lessons into a discussion of problems in contemporary music - analysis of techniques, language and styles of music. Garayev hated thoughtless attitudes toward folk music. He made his students learn the inner workings of folk music.

- Imran Qasymov, Azerbaijani writer:

It seems like all civilization is in Garayev's hands, not as simple encyclopedic data but in a profound way. He was an indisputable authority in music circles in the USSR.

- Arif Malikov, Azerbaijani composer and Garayev's student:

He was very strict with his students. He had an encyclopedic knowledge of almost everything related to problems of life as well as problems of art regardless of whether it was in the field of science, music or literature. He was acquainted with so many intelligent people. You gain so much confidence through belief in your teacher when he is a great Master. We never dared to think of skipping class or of not coming prepared. Our classes were one-on-one with him, but we didn't leave when they were over. We would stay on and listen to what went on with the next student. That's why there were always so many people in Garayev's classes all the time despite how hard it was to enroll with him.

== Tribute to his memory ==
The International Festival of Contemporary Music has been held since 1986 with the support of the Ministry of Culture of Azerbaijan.

- In memory of Gara Garayev:
  - metro station in Baku
  - an avenue in Baku
  - a street in Imishli (city)
  - Children's Music School No.75 in Moscow
  - a ship
- A memorial plaque installed on the wall of Gara Garayev's house in Baku.
- In The 30th of February, the monument to Gara Garayev opened by President Ilham Aliyev in 28 May Street of Baku.
- A memorial board installed at Gara Garayev's house in Moscow. Where he lived between 1973 and 1982.

== Major works ==
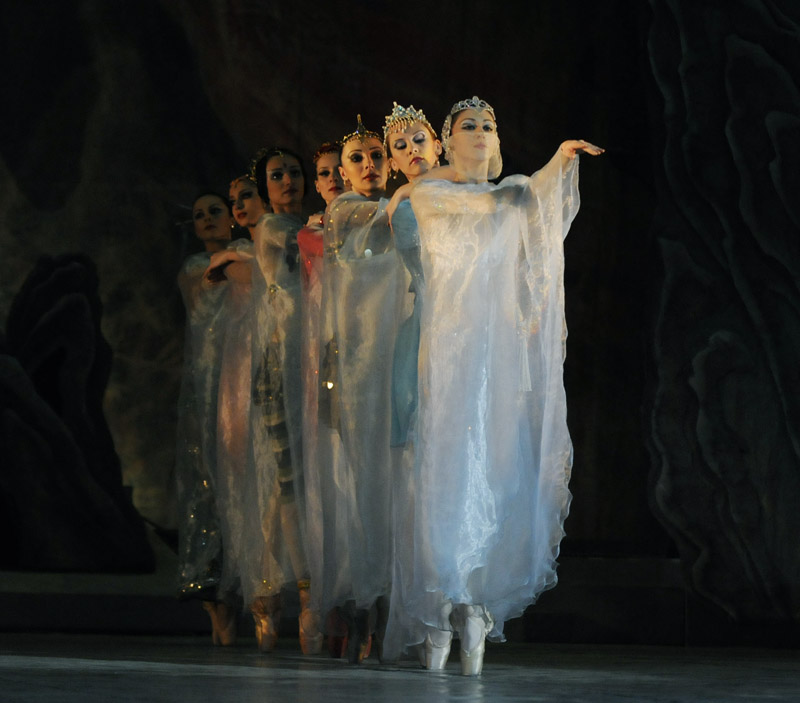
Scene from the Seven Beauties ballet.

- 1942 – Film score for A Story About the Oil Workers of the Caspian Sea
- 1943 – Symphony No. 1
- 1943 – Opera Motherland, with Jovdat Hajiyev, premiered in Baku in 1945
- 1947 – Symphonic poem Leyli and Majnun. Edited Muslim Magomayev's opera Shah Ismayil
- 1948 – Seven Beauties, ballet
- 1949 – Seven Beauties, a suite for symphonic orchestra
- 1950 – Six children's pieces for piano
- 1952 – Albanian Rhapsody, children's pieces for piano
- 1957 – Path of Thunder ballet
- 1958 – Film score for Her Great Heart, three nocturnes for jazz orchestra
- 1960 – Don Quixote, symphonic sketches
- 1960 – Sonata for violin and piano
- 1951-63 – 24 Preludes for piano
- 1964 – Symphony No. 3
- 1967 – Violin Concerto

== Honours and awards ==
- Hero of Socialist Labour (1978)
- Two Orders of Lenin (1967, 1978)
- Order of the October Revolution (1971)
- Order of the Red Banner of Labour (1961)
- Stalin Prize, twice (1946, 1948)
- Lenin Prize (1967)
- Azerbaijan SSR State Prize (1965)
- Honoured Artist of the Azerbaijani SSR (1955)
- People's Artiste of the Azerbaijan SSR (1958)
- People's Artist of the USSR (1959)

== See also ==
- List of People's Artistes of the Azerbaijan SSR
