= Khayyam Mirzazade =

Azerbaijani composer (1935–2018)

- Born: 5 October 1935
- Origin: Baku, Azerbaijan
- Died: 30 July 2018 (aged 82)
- Occupation: Composer

Khayyam Hadi oglu Mirzazade (Azerbaijani: Xəyyam Hadı oğlu Mirzəzadə; 5 October 1935 – 30 July 2018) was an Azerbaijani composer and professor.

== Biography ==
Khayyam Mirzazade was born on October 5, 1935, in Baku. In 1957, he graduated from Azerbaijan State Conservatoire and from 1957, he taught at Azerbaijan State Conservatoire. From 1969 to 1983, he was the manager of composition cathedra at Azerbaijan State Conservatoire. Khayyam Mirzazade is the author of symphonic and chamber compositions, music to drama spectacles and movies and lyric songs.

On October 7, 2000, he was awarded with Shohrat Order by the President of Azerbaijan.

== Titles and awards ==
- Honored Art Worker of the Azerbaijan SSR (1972)
- People's Artist of the Azerbaijan SSR (1987)
- Lenin Komsomol Prize of the Azerbaijan SSR (1970)
- State premiums of Azerbaijan (1976, 1986)
- “Shohrat” Order (2000)

== Compositions ==
For chorus, soloist and symphony orchestra:

- “Blossom, our Motherland” cantata (together with E.Mahmudov, lyrics by Z.Jabbarzade, 1964)
- Ode about party (lyrics by B.Vahabzade, 1975)

For symphony orchestra:

- Symphony I (1957)
- Symphony II (Triptych, 1970)
- Little lyric suite (1963)
- Sketches-63 (1963)
- “In Mughan fields” suite (1967)

For chamber orchestra:

- Music (1964)
- 3 choreographic scenes (1969)

For woodwind instruments:

- Sextet (1962)

For string quartet:

- Quartet I (1956)
- Quartet II (1961)
- Four miniatures (1958)
- Norashen dances (1972)

For brass instruments:

- Quartet (1970)

For violin and fortepiano:

- Sonatina (1950)
- A poem and scherzo (1952)

For solo instrument

- Genesis, Sonata for viola solo (1982)

== Music to movies ==
- 1961 – “Our street”
- 1964 – “Summit” (a plot in film-almanach “Whom do we love much”
- 1970 – “My seven sons”
- 1972 – “I grew up at the seaside”
- 1973 – “Along a dangerous marine way” (short-movie)
- 1974 – “Winds blow in Baku”
- 1977 – “A stab in the back”
- 1978 – “Country house for one family”
- 1981 – “The day after tomorrow, at midnight”
- 1985 – “Cottage season”
- 1987 – “Aphrodite’s hands” (short movie)
- 1990 – “Basement”
- 1993 – “My white city”
- 1993 – “Hello from another world”
- 1993-2002 – “Shooting is postponed”
