= Maiden Tower (ballet) =

1940 Azerbaijani ballet by Afrasiyab Badalbeyli

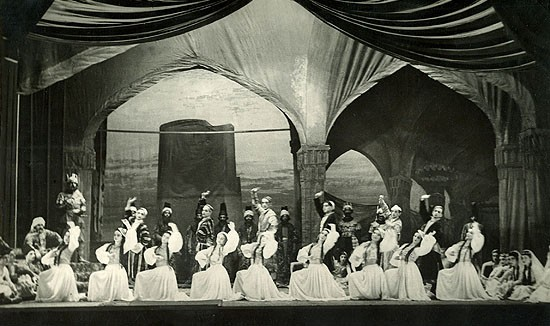
- A scene from the first staging of the ballet, 1940.
- Music: Afrasiyab Badalbeyli
- Libretto: Afrasiyab Badalbeyli
- Premiere: 18 April 1940; Azerbaijan State Academic Opera and Ballet Theater, Baku

Maiden Tower is the first Azerbaijani ballet and the first ballet in the Muslim Eastern countries. It consists of three acts with a prologue and epilogue. Afrasiyab Badalbeyli is the author of the music and libretto.

The premiere took place on 18 April 1940 at the Azerbaijan State Academic Opera and Ballet Theater, and a new version of the ballet was presented on 24 October 1999.This new version did not include the Soviet propaganda the previous version did. Yulana Alikishizade was the author of the new version. Madina Aliyeva and Gulaghasi Mirzoyev danced the main parts. Farhad Badalbeyli was the author of the revised score. Members of Azerbaijan State Song and Dance Ensemble under the guidance of Afag Malikova took part in the performance.

== Plot ==
The story begins with Khan Jhahangir coming back to the palace from the battle. One of many wives of the khan was pregnant before he left, and the khan was expecting a male heir. But the child was a girl, so the khan ordered the execution of the baby. Princess Gulyanag is raised as an unwanted child, away from the eyes of the khan until she reaches maturity. By then, she has a lover named Polad. But the khan sees the now 17 years old Gulyanag, and not realizing that she is his daughter, falls in love with her. Starting from here, the two versions of the play start to diverge, before connecting at the end.

In the first version, upon learning of her loves, the khan separates Gulyanag from Polad by locking her in a tower. Polad find the tower eventually, but the khan is also there to marry Gulyanag. Polad and Khan Jhahangir battle and Polad wins. Polad climbs the stairs of the tower and Gulyanag hears the steps. She thinks that it is the Khan coming to get her instead of Polad and throws herself off the window of the tower to the sea, falling to her death.

In the revised version, the Khan forces Gulyanag to marry him. But the princess refuses, and tells the khan she won't marry him until he builds her a tower, to gain time. This shows the smart leading female character, not shown in the previous Soviet version. When the tower is finished, the Khan locks her in the tower and starts preparations for the wedding. But Polad finds him in the palace and kills the khan before making his way to the tower. Gulyanag, knowing the Khan was preparing for the wedding, upon hearing the rushed footsteps, assumes the person is the Khan instead of her lover, coming to reunite with her. She, again, jumps off the window of the tower and to her death. Polad reaches the top of the tower with no trace of Gulyanag. Realizing his lover died, he mourns her.
