= Arif Malikov =

Azerbaijani composer (1933–2019)

Arif Malikov Arif Məlikov
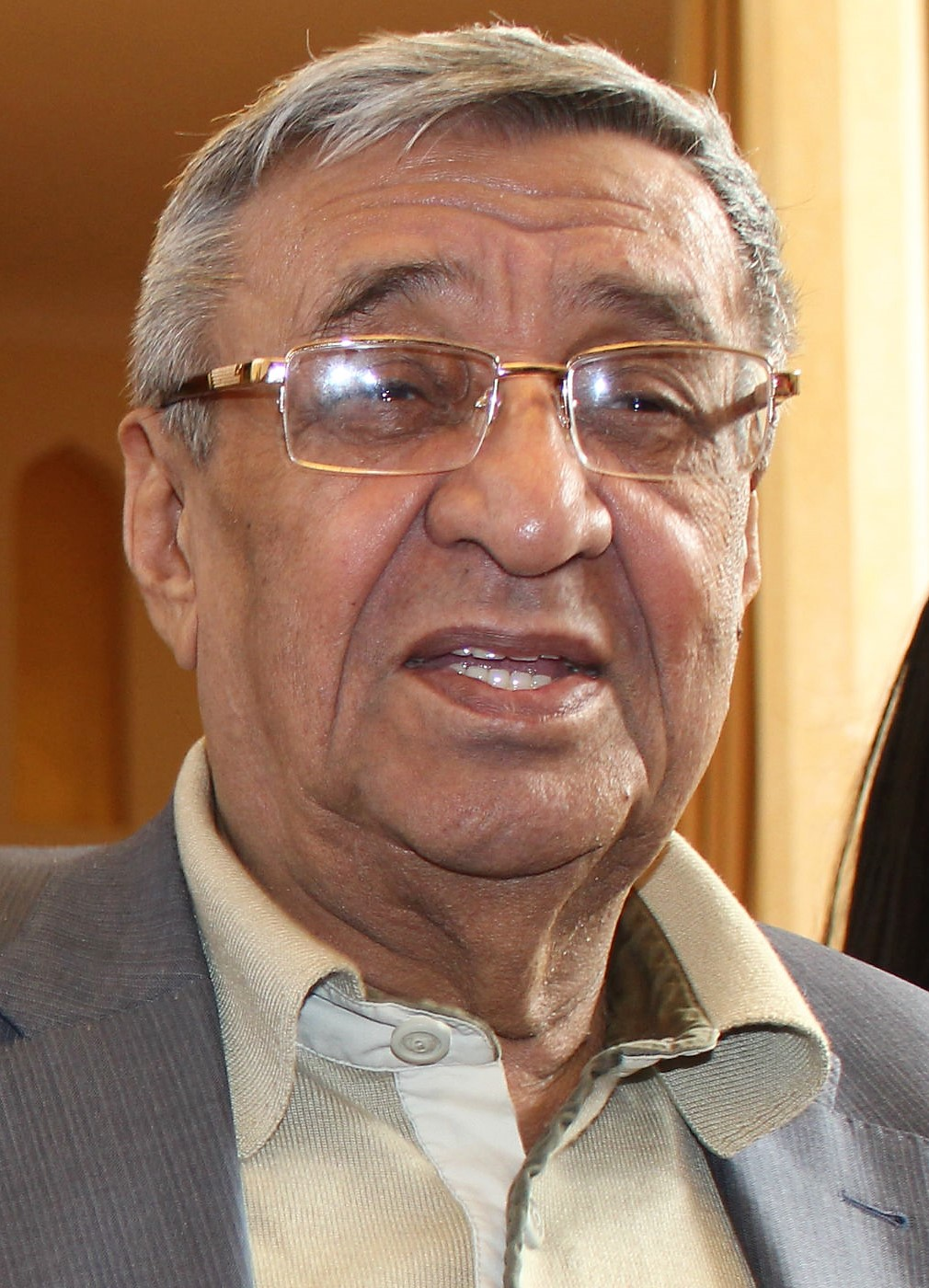
- Born: September 13, 1933; Baku, Azerbaijan SSR, TSFSR, USSR
- Died: May 9, 2019 (aged 85); Baku, Azerbaijan
- Occupation: composer
- Awards

Arif Malikov (also Melikov; Baku, 13 September 1933 – Baku, 9 May 2019) was an Azerbaijani composer. He graduated from the Baku Conservatory as a music composer in 1958. He shot to fame in 1961 when his first major composition Legend of Love was staged at the Kirov State Academic Theatre of Opera and Ballet in Leningrad (present day St Petersburg) and received nationwide acclaim. The ballet has been staged in several countries in Europe and is regarded as one of the finest works emerging from the former Soviet Union. The ballet Legend of Love is based upon the legend of "Farhad and Shirin", a story of unrequited love that was immortalized by Turkish poet Nazim Hikmet. Malikov went on to write music for two more ballets, including Yer üzündə iki nəfər (Two People on Earth, 1967) and İki ürək dastanı (Poem of Two Hearts, 1981), six symphonies & eight symphony poems. He also wrote scores for a large number of films and plays, and was familiar with practically all genres of music composition.

Malikov was conferred the highest award that an artist could get in the former Soviet Union — The People's Artist of the USSR. He was also honoured with a concert hall named after him at Turkey's Bilkent University. He was an Honorary Doctor of Khazar University (2012), Baku. Azerbaijan.

After Azerbaijan gained its independence from the Soviet Union (late 1991), Malikov settled in Baku, where he taught music in the Azerbaijan State Conservatoire.

He was a founding member of the Eurasian Academy.

He died on 9 May 2019, at the age of 85.
