= Afrasiyab Badalbeyli =

Azerbaijani musician (1907–1976)

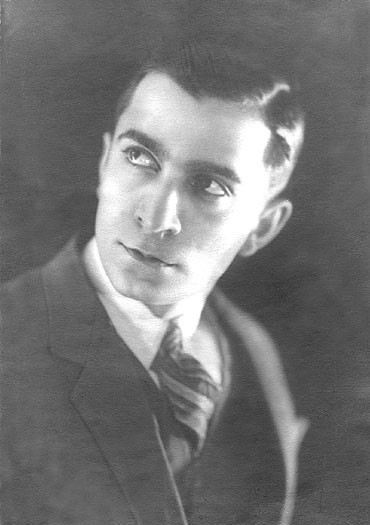
- Afrasiyab Badalbeyli in the 1930s
- Born: 19 April 1907; Shusha
- Died: 6 January 1976 (aged 68)
- Occupations: Composer, conductor

Signature
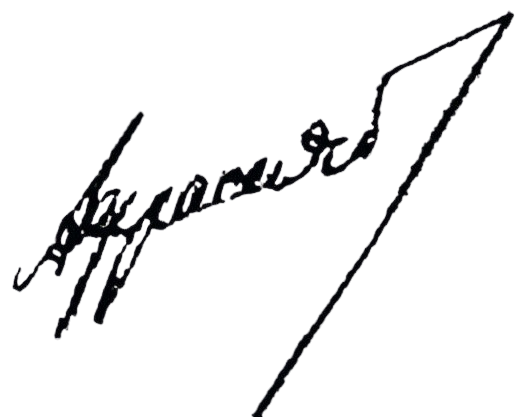

Afrasiyab Badal bey oghlu Badalbeyli (Azerbaijani: Əfrasiyab Bədəl bəy oğlu Bədəlbəyli) (19 April 1907, in Baku – 6 January 1976, in Baku) was a Soviet Azerbaijani composer, with noble Qajar origins (he was the descendant of Bahman Mirza and Abbas Mirza), conductor and music critic, author of the music and libretto of Giz Galasi (The Maiden Tower), the first Azerbaijani ballet and the first ballet in the Middle East.

== Life ==
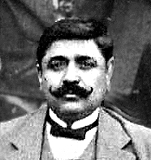
Afrasiyab's father, Badal bey Badalbeyli

Afrasiyab Badalbeyli was born to Shusha natives Badal and Rahima Badalbeyli in 1907. At the time, the Badalbeylis were already becoming known as a family of great musicians. His father, Badal bey Badalbeyli was a mugham expert and a music teacher at a Russo-Tartar school in Baku; he also helped Uzeyir Hajibeyov, his cousin, to found the first musical theatre in Azerbaijan. Afrasiyab Badalbeyli's paternal uncle Ahmed Badalbeyli (Agdamski) was a renowned opera singer. Afrisiyab's brother Shamsi Badalbeyli later became a musical play director. In 1930, Afrasiyab Badalbeyli graduated from the Azerbaijan State University majoring in Oriental studies and continued his education at a music school affiliated with the Leningrad Conservatory, which he finished in 1938. He began working as a conductor at the Azerbaijan State Opera and Ballet Theatre in 1930. In 1931, he married ballerina Gamar Almaszadeh who accompanied him to Leningrad while pursuing higher education at a professional ballet school herself. This marriage, however, ended in divorce leading to Badalbeyli's subsequent marriages.

== Career ==
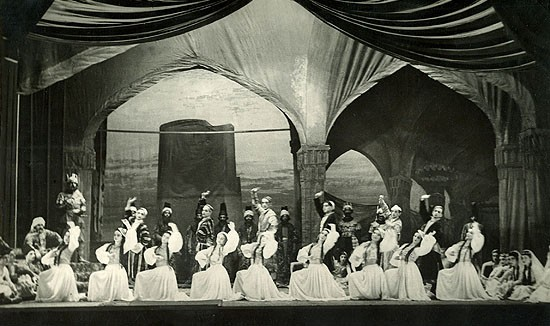
Scene from the "Maiden Tower" ballet

Badalbeyli's career in music began in 1928 when he composed music for Jafar Jabbarly's staged play Od Galini. He is particularly famous for being the author of the first Azerbaijani ballet, entitled Giz Galasi (The Maiden Tower), which he composed in 1940. The ballet was dedicated to Gamar Almaszadeh. His later works included Khalg Gazabi ("The Popular Rage", 1941; co-author Boris Zeidman), Nizami (1948) and Soyudlar aghlamaz ("Willows Don't Cry", 1971). He wrote librettos for the Azerbaijani opera Bahadir va Sona and the ballets Giz Galasi, Garaja Giz ("Nigella") and Gizil Achar ("The Golden Key"). He composed background music for theatrical plays and being the only libretto translator of the time did equirhythmic Azeri translations of the librettos of the operas by Pyotr Tchaikovsky, Gioacchino Rossini, Armen Tigranyan and Zakaria Paliashvili. Throughout the 1950s and the 1960s he published several books on the history and development of classical music in Azerbaijan, namely: Discussions on Music, Gurban Pirimov, Musical Dictionary, and The Azerbaijan State Opera and Ballet Theatre. In 1960, he was awarded the title of the People's Artiste of the Azerbaijan SSR. He remained a conductor at the Opera and Ballet Theatre till his death in 1976.

== See also ==
- List of People's Artistes of the Azerbaijan SSR
