= Alibaba Abdullayev =

Azerbaijani folklore dancer, teacher, and choreographer

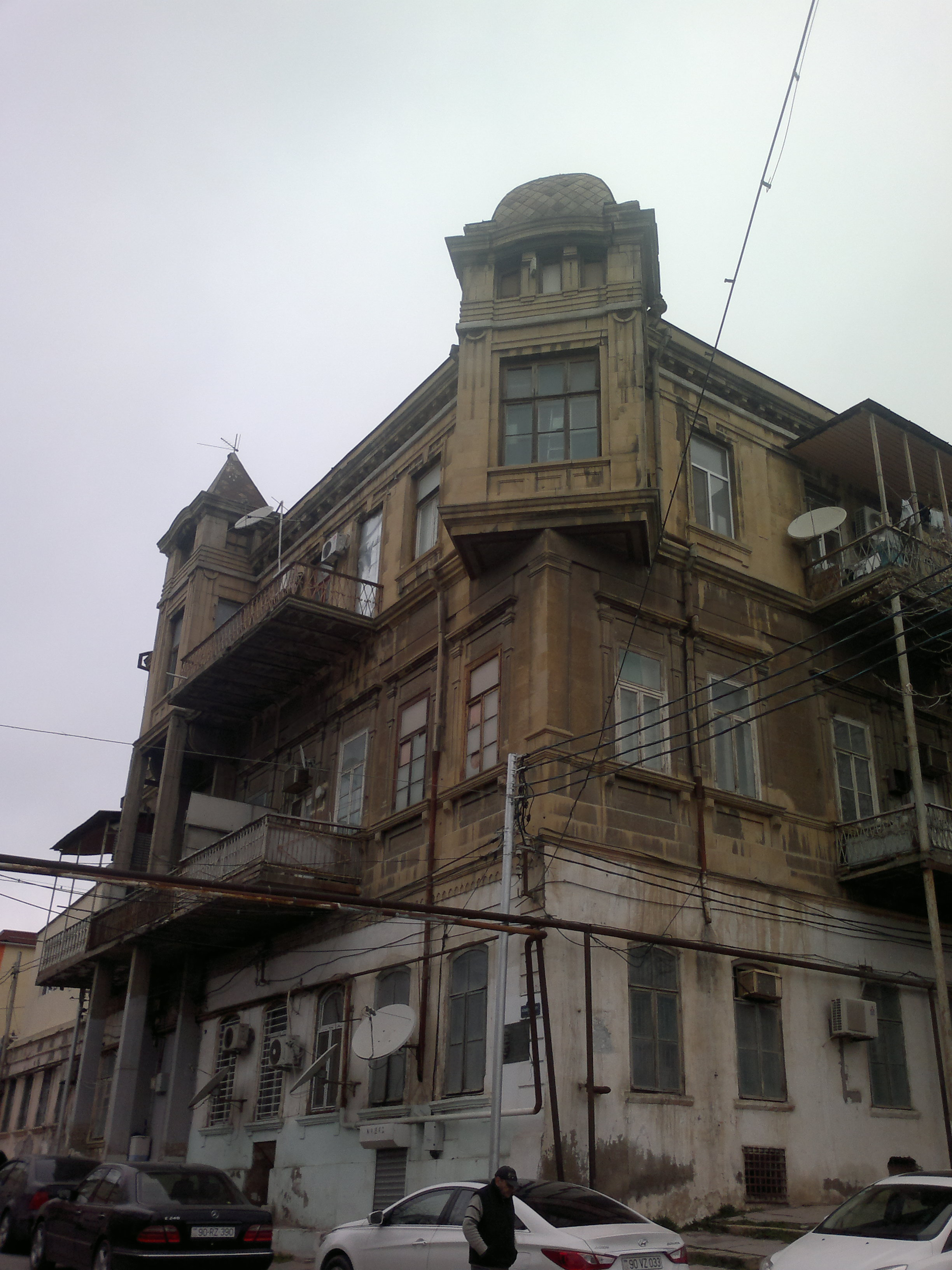
- The house where Alibaba Abdullayev lived in the "Kubinka" area of Baku in 1940-1980. The street on which the house is located is named after Alibaba Abdullayev.
- Organization(s): Azerbaijan State Academic Philharmonic Hall; Nakhchivan State Musical Dramatic Theatre
- Awards: Azerbaijan SSR People's Artist(1959); Honored Artist of the Azerbaijan SSR(1943)

Alibaba Abdulla oglu Abdullayev (Azerbaijani: Əlibaba Abdulla oğlu Abdullayev), also known as Ali Bala Abdullayev (Azerbaijani: Əli Bala Abdullayev) in some sources, was an Azerbaijani-Soviet folk dancer and choreographer. He served as the artistic director of the collective of the Azerbaijan Philharmonic's music and dance ensemble, and was honored with the titles of Azerbaijan SSR Honored Artist (1943) and Azerbaijan SSR People's Artist (1959).

Alibaba Abdullayev started his professional career in 1936 at the Azerbaijan State Philharmonic, and two years later, he participated in the 1st Azerbaijani Fine Arts Decade held in Moscow. During the years of World War II, he led a dance group, collaborated with the Soviet army in Iran, created some works, and met with military personnel from the 416th Rifle Division in Mozdok.

After the war, Alibaba Abdullayev staged Azerbaijani classical music compositions at the Musical Comedy Theater in Baku. In the 1960s, as the choreographer of the State Philharmonic, he created a series of dance compositions based on works of Azerbaijani literature. In addition, Alibaba Abdullayev taught at the Azerbaijan Art Institute named after Mirza Aghaali Aliyev and the Baku Choreography School. In addition to his work on the theater stage, Alibaba Abdullayev was also involved in individual and collective dance performances in several Azerbaijani-Soviet films. He was also known for composing songs.

One of the streets in Baku, where he was born, bears the name of Alibaba Abdullayev, and a memorial plaque is placed on the wall of the house where he lived. A documentary film has been made about Alibaba Abdullayev.

== Life ==
=== Early years ===
Alibaba Abdullayev was born on March 23 or August 9, 1915, in the city of Baku, in the Baku Governorate. In those years, he was born into the family of Abdulla and housewife Püstəxanım, who were well known in the city. He began working in the kitchen at the age of 16. Even in his early childhood, due to his love for music and the arts, he started attending the Cultural Center named after İbrahim Əbilov in his spare time and became a member of the dance group there.

Alibaba Abdullayev was selected by composer Üzeyir Hacıbəyov in 1935 to join the dance ensemble of the Azerbaijan State Philharmonic that he had created himself, and in 1936, he became a member of the newly established Song and Dance Ensemble of the Philharmonic. In November of that year, the first Azerbaijani Folk Dance Festival, in which he also participated, was held in Baku. Hacıbəyov wrote in his notes that Alibaba Abdullayev "felt the rhythm of music deeply" and added that his dances vividly portrayed the melody to the audience. According to filmmaker Aydin Kazimzade, Alibaba Abdullayev's art flourished with the observation and support of Üzeyir Hacıbəyov and reached its creative peak. In 1938, he participated in the 1st Azerbaijani Fine Arts Decade held in Moscow with the ensemble led by Gamar Almaszadeh. He performed the dance "Qaytağı" there. During this period, despite the official ban on national resources in the existing communist regime, it was undesirable, but along with all this, Alibaba Abdullayev overcame his creative challenges and trials and paved his way.

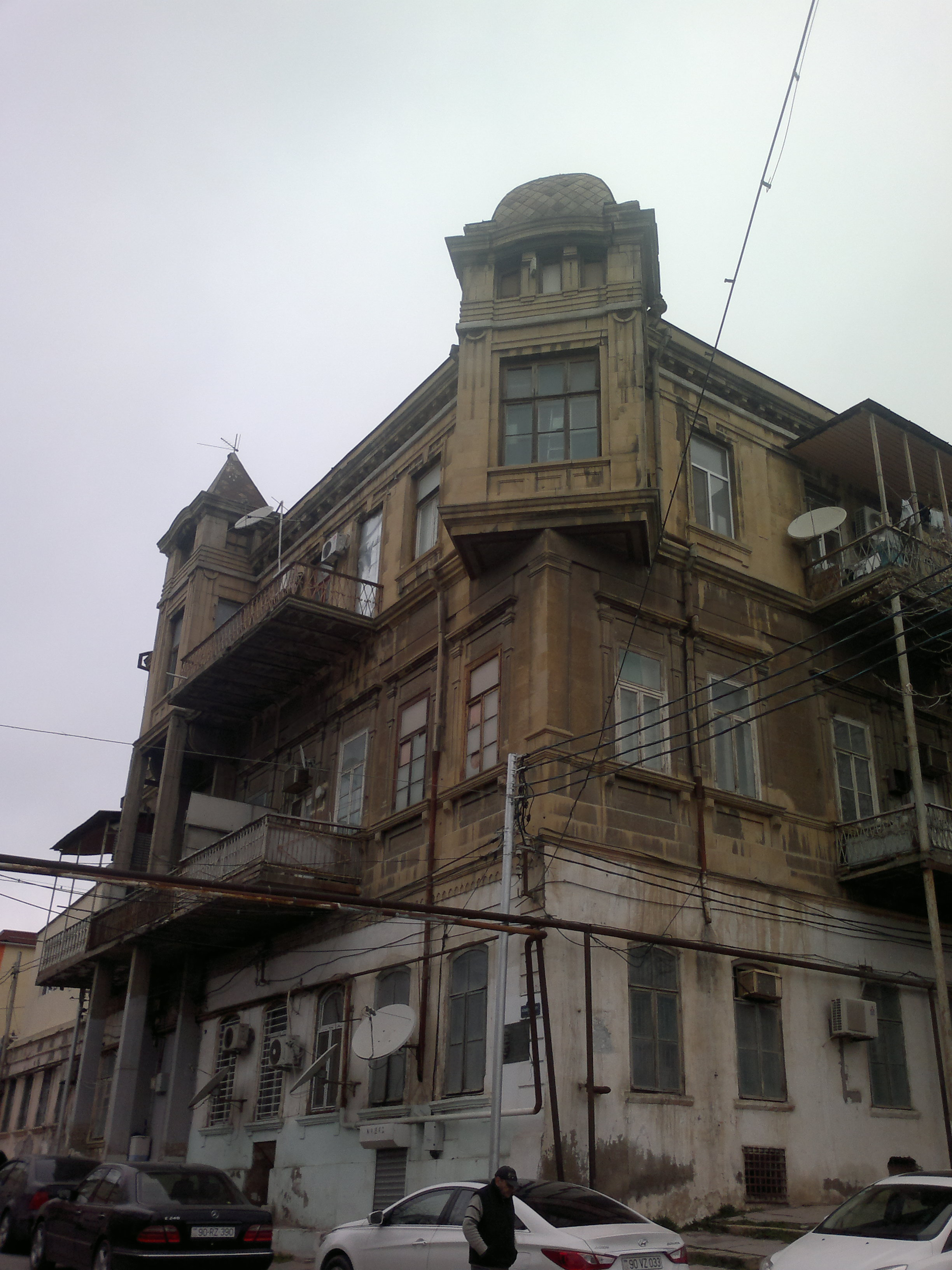
The house where Alibaba Abdullayev lived in Baku from 1940 to 1980 in the "Kubinka" area. The street where the house is located is named after Alibaba Abdullayev.

In April 1941, Alibaba Abdullayev became the assistant to the artistic director of the ensemble, and in June of the same year, he became the head of the dance group. In the fall of the same year, he participated in concerts in front of the Soviet troops in Iran. During the years of World War II, Alibaba Abdullayev performed on both the front and rear fronts as a member of the Song and Dance Ensemble of the Philharmonic. In 1942, the preparation of the cantata "Vatan və cəbhə" by Üzeyir Hacıbəyov was entrusted to Alibaba Abdullayev. He also became the director and performer of the patriotic march "Dədə Qorqud" in the years of World War II. In 1943, he was awarded the honorary title of Honored Artist of the Azerbaijan SSR. In the same year, Alibaba Abdullayev, along with other cultural figures, including Samad Vurghun, Bülbül, Alasgar Alakbarov, and Gurban Pirimov, was sent to the Mozdok region, where he met with military personnel of the mainly Azerbaijani 416th Rifle Division.

=== Post-War Years ===
After World War II, Alibaba Abdullayev received an invitation from composer Suleyman Alasgarov to work at the Musical Comedy Theater named after Jalil Mammadguluzade (now the Azerbaijan State Academic Theatre of Musical Comedy) in honor of Jalil Mammadguluzade. Here, he appeared in the staged performances of Fikret Amirov's "Gözün aydın" (Alay character), Suleyman Alasgarov's "Beş manatlıq gəlin" (Qiyas character), and Viktor Dolidze's "Keto və Kote" (Kote character) operettas and also worked as a choreographer. In 1947, Alibaba Abdullayev was admitted to the dance group of the Azerbaijan State Academic Philharmonic Hall again during the preparation period for the 1st World Youth Festival in Czechoslovakia. He was awarded the laureate diploma at the festival as a soloist. In 1957, Alibaba Abdullayev participated in the VI Youth and Students Festival in Moscow. He organized the concert program and the dances he choreographed. At this festival, Alibaba Abdullayev won four gold, one silver, and three bronze medals.

In 1959, Alibaba Abdullayev became the choreographer for the ensemble named after Gamar Almaszade at the Azerbaijani Fine Arts Decade held in Moscow at the request of Gamar Almaszade. Alibaba Abdullayev's choreography received high praise from dance experts. In the same year, on June 10, Alibaba Abdullayev was awarded the honorary title of People's Artist of the Azerbaijan SSR by the decree of the Supreme Soviet of the Azerbaijan SSR. In that year, he choreographed the dance "Vağzalı-mirzəyi". In the early 1960s, while working as a choreographer, Alibaba Abdullayev created a number of dance compositions based on works of classical Azerbaijani literature, including pieces inspired by Jalil Mammadguluzade, Molla Panah Vagif (to the music of Jahangir Jahangirov), Jafar Jabbarli, and others. In the early 1960s, the State Philharmonic's Song and Dance Ensemble, including Alibaba Abdullayev's choreographed dances, was warmly welcomed in the local press, and in 1961, director Seyfulla Badalov made a two-part documentary film called "Meetings in Africa" about it.

Alibaba Abdullayev taught at the Azerbaijan State Institute of Arts and Culture named after Mirza Agaaliyev and the Baku Choreography Academy. He also collaborated with Rashid Behbudov at the Azerbaijan State Song Theatre. Alibaba Abdullayev died in Baku on August 9, 1980, at the age of 65, and was buried in the II Alley of Honor.

== Creativity ==
=== Dances ===
==== In theater ====
Alibaba Abdullayev also contributed to dances in opera and musical comedies. He choreographed dances for performances at the stage of the Azerbaijan State Musical Comedy Theater, including works such as Arshin Mal Alan by Üzeyir Hacıbəyov, Ulduz by Suleyman Alasgarov, Durna by Said Rustamov, Qızıl Gül by Soltan Hajibeyov. In Alibaba Abdullayev's creativity, plot compositions held an important place. He created dance suites like Dostluq as well as original dances such as Ovçular, Şənlik süitası, Neftçilər süitası, Məhsul süitası, Balıqçılar, Futbolçular, and more. In addition to choreographing original dances, he also participated in the organization of mass scenes in dance ensemble performances. Alibaba Abdullayev showcased dances and choreographic numbers not only with professional dancers but also with amateur art enthusiasts in cities like Nakhchivan, Lankaran, and Kirovabad (modern-day Ganja).

Alibaba Abdullayev collaborated with Azerbaijani composers such as Üzeyir Hacıbəyov, Suleyman Alasgarov, Tofig Guliyev, Jahangir Jahangirov to collect historical folk dances and create new performances using their dance rhythms. He staged folk dances like Ovçular, Bənövşə, Bulaq başı, Bahar, Ay gözəl, Qazağı, Məzəli rəqs, Qaytağı, Gəlin tərifi, and Nağaraçılar. According to his daughter Elmira Abdullayeva, Alibaba Abdullayev constantly worked on himself, studied a lot of literature related to his creativity, and created sketches and paintings of dance performances on paper at night. He also mentioned that he showed these sketches to the Philharmonic dancers and practiced with them, and based on these sketches, he staged dances.

Alibaba Abdullayev also worked in the field of Azerbaijani cinema, which holds a special place in his creativity. He choreographed both individual and collective dances in films such as Görüş (1955), O olmasın, bu olsun (1956), Əhməd hardadır? (1963), Sehrli xalat (1964), Dəli Kür (1969), and Ulduzlar sönmür (1971). Film critic Aydın Kazımzadə wrote about Alibaba Abdullayev, saying that he "combined directing, choreography, and painting" and "lived for dance." He also provided choreography for the film Səbuhi (1941), which was about the life and creativity of playwright Mirza Fatali Akhundov. In this film, he choreographed a dance performed by Leyla Bədirbəyli for the first time, who played the role of Tubu, the life partner of Mirzə Fətəli Axundov. Alibaba Abdullayev also choreographed dances in films like Arşın mal alan (1945) and Fətəli xan (1947). He contributed dances to two episodes of the film O olmasın, bu olsun (1958), directed by Huseyn Seyidzade. One of these dances was when Məşədi İbad was taken to the bathhouse, and the other was a dance performed at Məşədi İbad's wedding. Alibaba Abdullayev also appeared in the film Görüş (1955) in a scene featuring Uzbek cotton pickers on a collective farm and a dance performed by Leyla Badirbayli. He also choreographed the dance Naz eləmə performed by Mahmud Esambayev and Amina Dilbazi in the film Əmək və qızılgül (1962), directed by Tofig Taghizade. He was the first performer of this dance. According to Aydin Kazimzade, this dance was considered a creative achievement for both dancers and dance directors. He believed that their movements conveyed a sense of "serious plasticity."

In addition to feature films, Alibaba Abdullayev's choreography was featured in documentary films such as Məktuba cavab (1944), Afrika görüşləri (1961), Qobustan (1967), and Salam, Əlcəzair (1968), as well as in artistic documentary films like Doğma xalqıma (1954) and Abşeron ritmləri (1970, concert film).

=== Music creation ===
Alibaba Abdullayev was not only a choreographer but also a singer. His song recordings with Leyla Badirbeyli and Tutu Hamidova (Dilbərim, Muleyli, Birdənəsən, Sarı gəlin, Qarabağın maralı), as well as Roza Jalilova (Naz eləmə), and others are preserved in the sound archives of the Azerbaijan State Radio.

== Heritage ==
In the territory known as "Kubinka" in the capital city of Baku, Azerbaijan, a street has been named after Alibaba Abdullayev. In this area where Alibaba Abdullayev lived from 1940 to 1980, there is a memorial plaque on the wall of a house located on the street bearing his name. In 2009, director Vusala Mirzayeva dedicated a documentary film titled "Sənəti böyüdən sənətkar" to the 95th anniversary of Alibaba Abdullayev, focusing on his life and creativity. According to Mirzəyeva, during the filming of the movie, she spent several months studying Əlibaba Abdullayev's creativity and interviewing his colleagues. On November 30, 2015, a concert dedicated to the 100th anniversary of Alibaba Abdullayev was held at the Müslüm Maqomayev Azerbaijan State Philharmonic Hall. The concert featured performances by the ensembles of the Azerbaijan State Song and Dance Ensemble, Azerbaijan State Academic Opera and Ballet Theater, Baku Choreography Academy, and the collective of the Azerbaijan State Children's Philharmonic.

== Sources ==
- Bürcəliyeva, Ş. (29 April 2011). "Kinoda rəqsin rolu" [The role of dance in cinema]. Mədəniyyət (in Azerbaijani). Mədəniyyət Nazirliyi.
- Hüseynzadə, R. (17 November 2015). Гений азербайджанского танца [Genius of Azerbaijani dance]. Каспій (in Azerbaijani). p. 13.
- İmanov, V. (13 November 2015). Алибаба Абдуллаев — 100: Гений азербайджанского танца [Alibaba Abdullayev - 100: The genius of Azerbaijani dance] (in Russian). Trend İnformasiya Agentliyi.
- Mokulsky, S. S., ed. (1961). "Abdullayev Ali Bala Abdulla ogly". Theater encyclopedia: [in 6 volumes]. Vol. 1: A - “Globe”. Moscow: Soviet Encyclopedia.
- Sarıyeva, İ. (13 April 2015). "Azərbaycan peşəkar rəqs sənətinin banisi Əlibaba Abdullayev..." [Alibaba Abdullayev, founder of Azerbaijani professional dance art...]. Bakı Xəbər (in Azerbaijani). Archived from the original on 8 March 2016.
- Surits, E. Y. (1966). Yu. I. Slonimsky (ed.). Всё о балете: словарь-справочник [Everything about ballet: dictionary-reference]. Moscow/Leninqrad: Музыка.
- Rəhmanlı, Əhsən; Əliyev, İlqar (2017). "Azərbaycan rəqslərinin səhnə təcəssümü" [Stage representation of Azerbaijani dances]. Konservatoriya (in Azerbaijani). 38 (4). Archived from the original on 3 June 2022.
