= Azerbaijani dances =

Type of dance

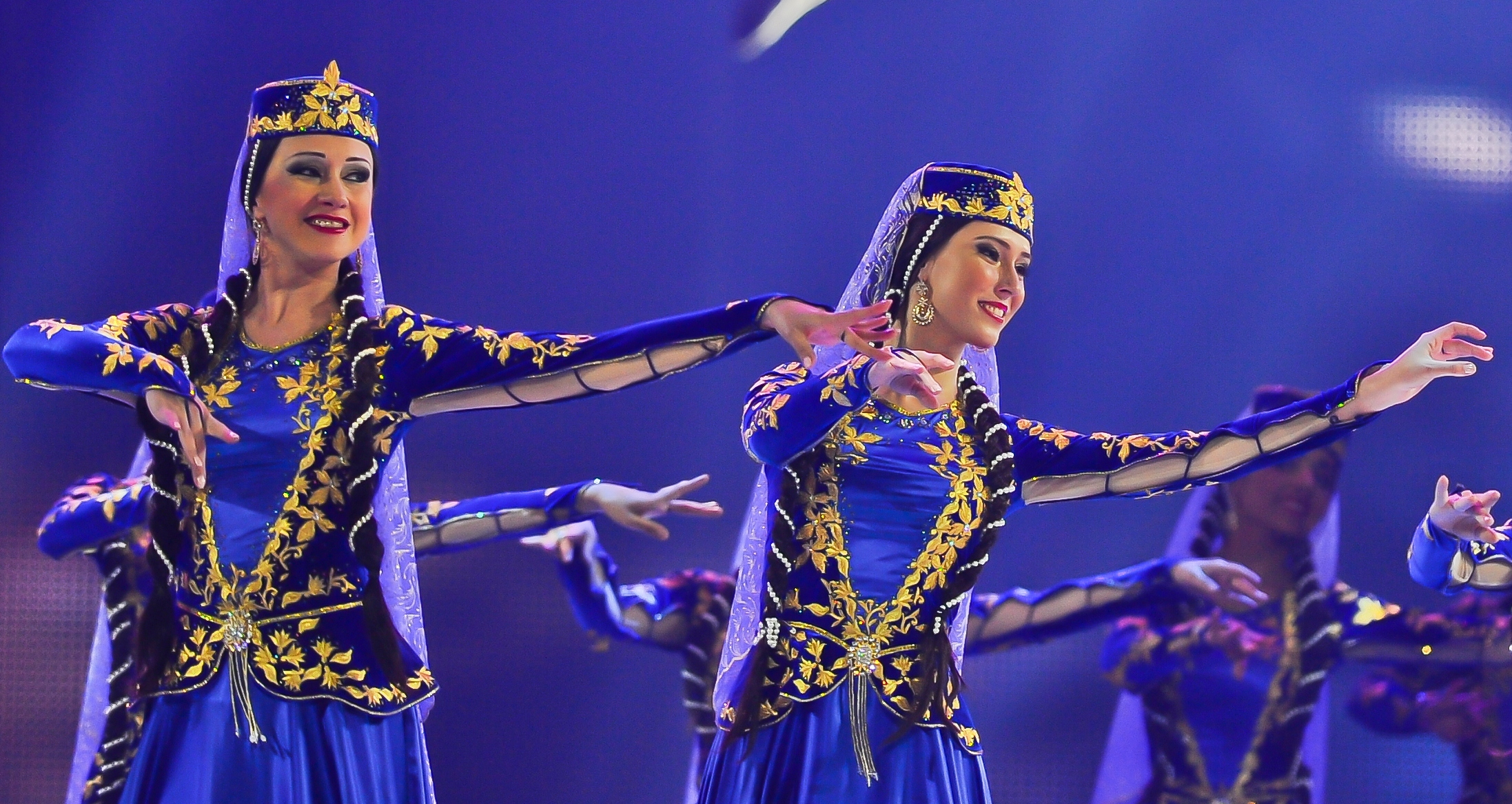
Female dance

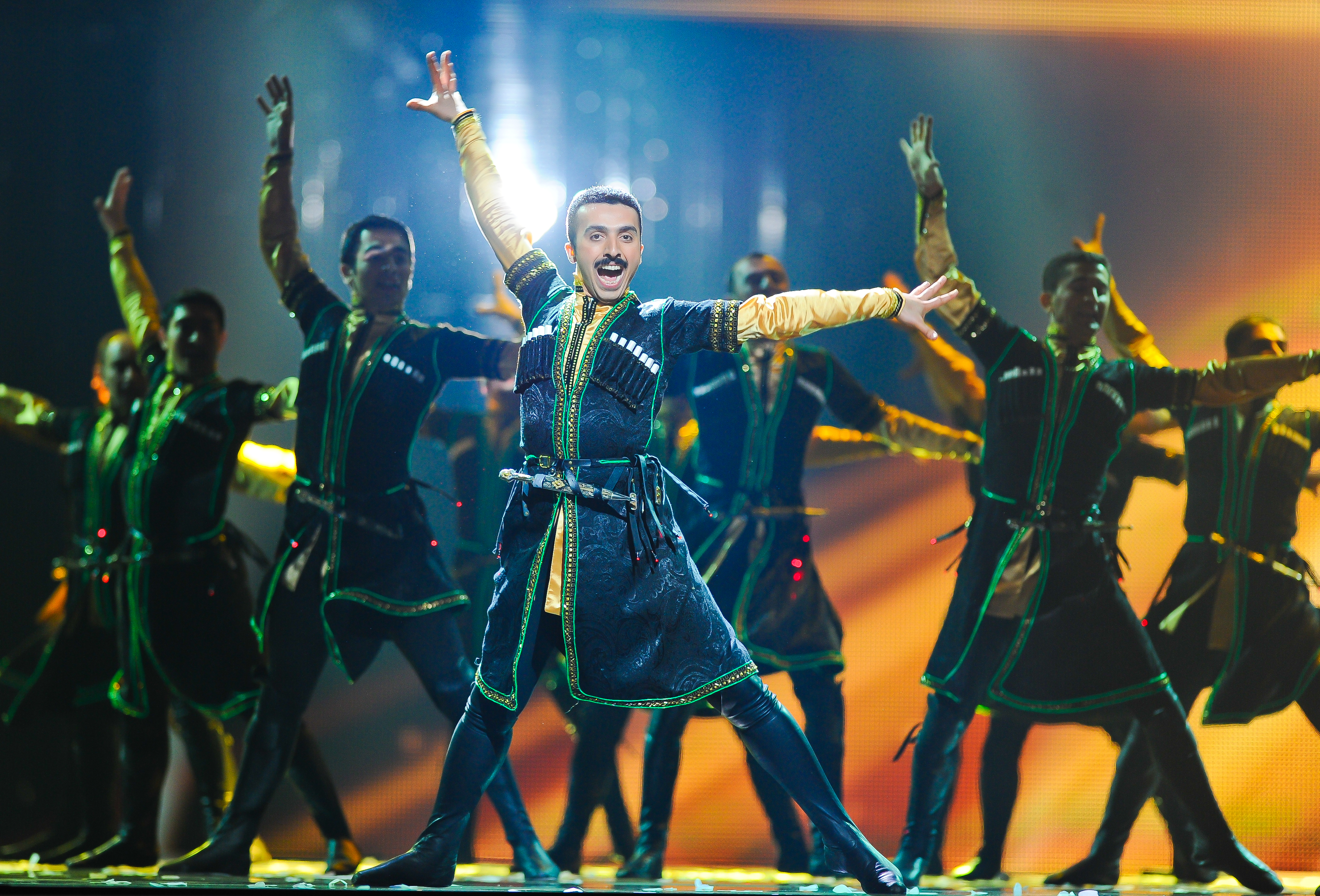
Male dance

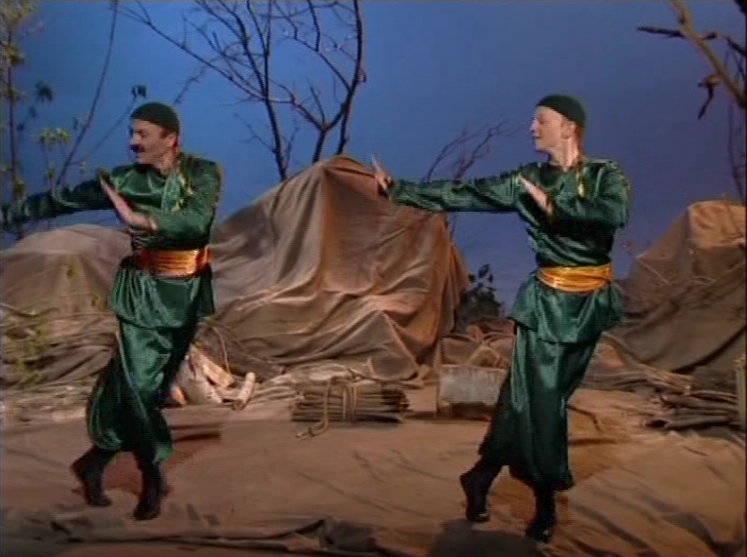
Shalakho

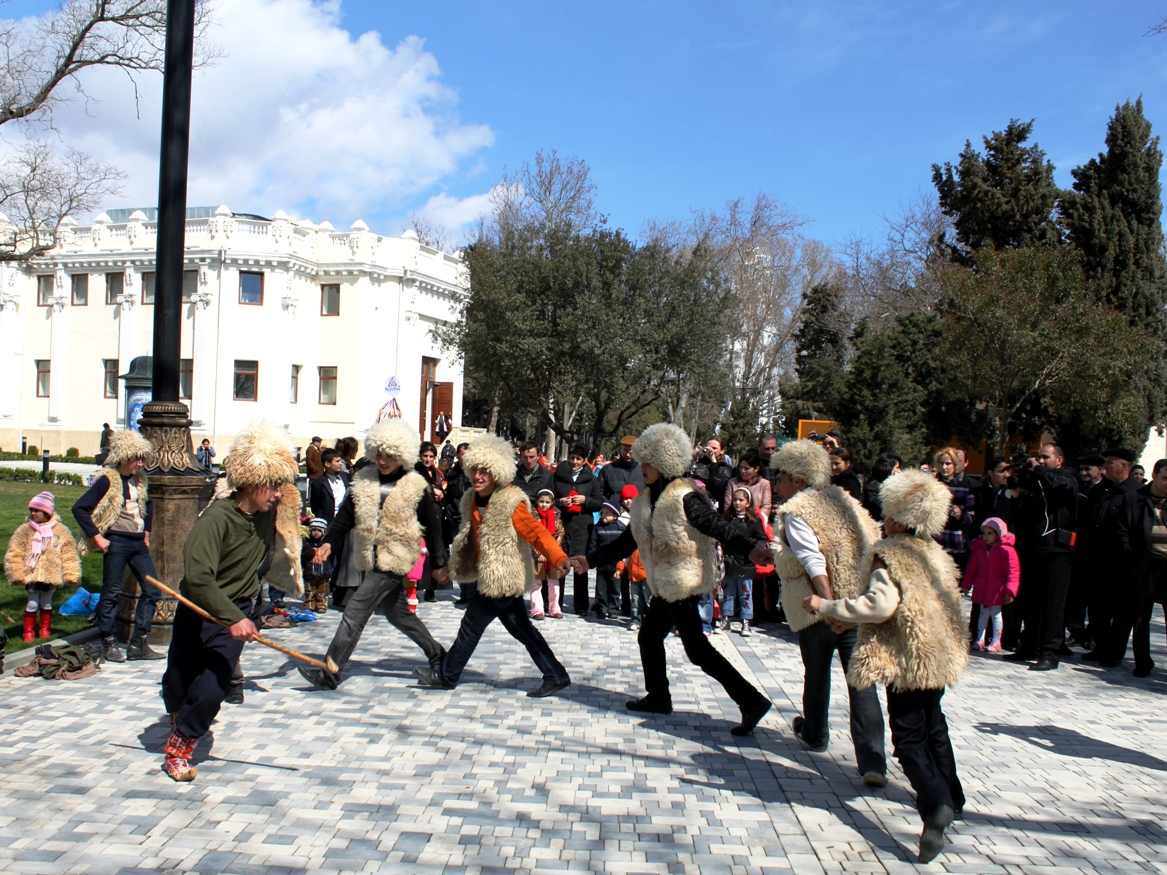
Khanchobany (dance) in Nowruz

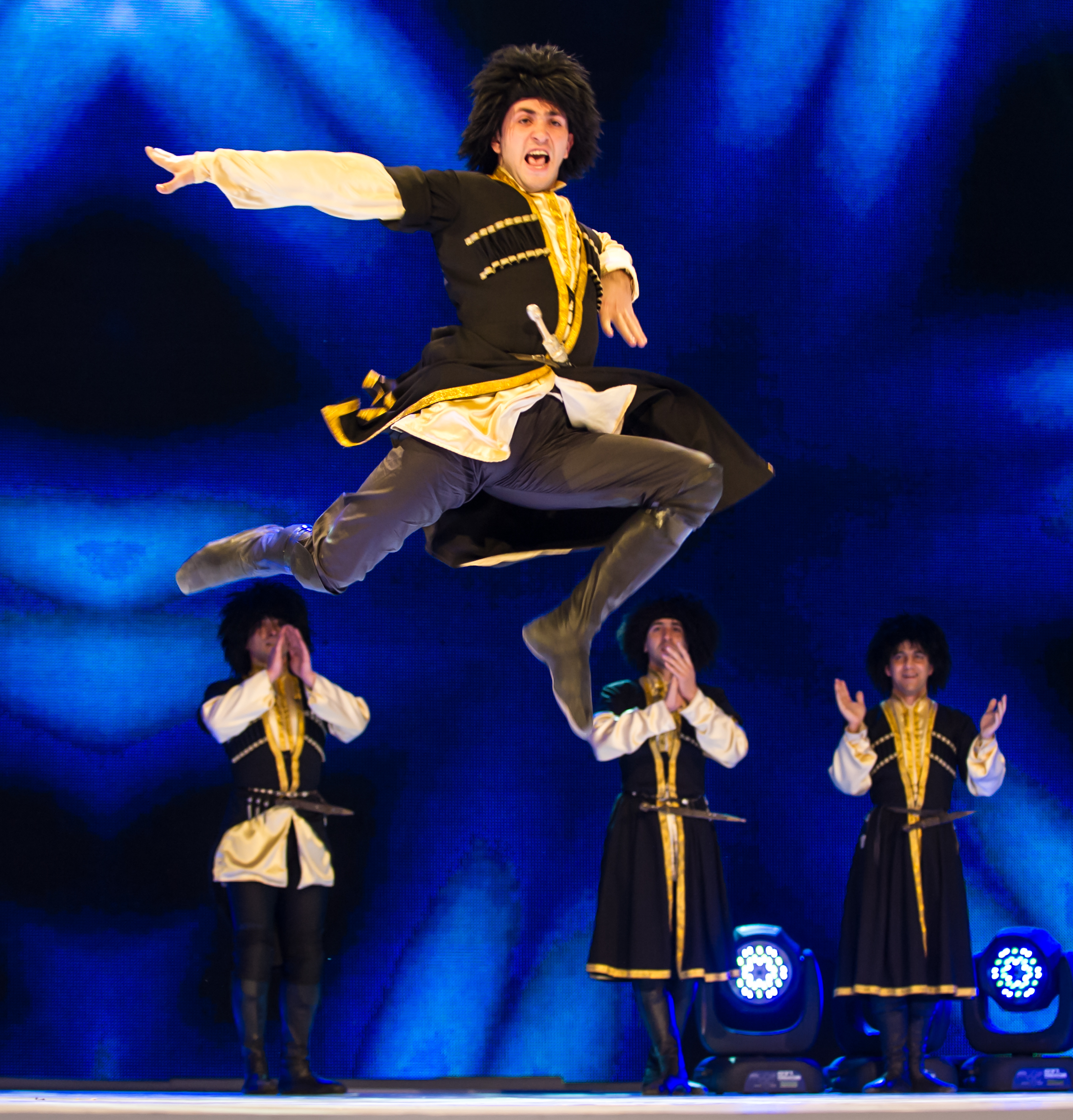
Jangi (dance)

Azerbaijani dances (Azerbaijani: Azərbaycan Rəqsləri) are traditional dances developed and performed in the Republic of Azerbaijan. These dances are known for their quick tempo and the dancers' traditional clothing.

== Examples of dances in Azerbaijan ==
- Abayi (Azerbaijani: Abayı) is an Azerbaijani dance with its origins in the Shaki and Zaqatala regions of Azerbaijan. The name of the dance refers to the middle-aged people who typically perform this dance with exaggerated movements for comedic effect. The dance's slow-tempo song was written by Shaki composers. This dance is traditionally performed as a group but has evolved into a solo dance.
- Agir Karadagi (Azerbaijani: Ağır Qaradağı, meaning "heavy Karadakhi") is a dance song that originated in Karadakh. This slow dance is popular in Shaki and Zaqatala.

- Anzali (Azerbaijani: Ənzəli) is a traditional dance that was created approximately in 1880–1890 in Baku. This slow dance is typically performed by older people at the beginning of wedding ceremonies.
- Asma Kasma (Azerbaijani: Asma Kəsmə, meaning "hanging cutting") is one of the oldest Azerbaijani wedding dances. The song "Asma-Kasma" accompanies the procession of the bride to the bridegroom's home as women dance alongside the bride. This slow, slightly exaggerated dance features several jumps.
- Asta Karabagi (Azerbaijani: Asta Qarabağı, meaning "slow Karabakhi") is a dance from Karabakh. This slow dance has fixed movements.
- Avari (Azerbaijani: Avarı) originates from the Avari people who live in Azerbaijan. Throughout the dance's three parts, the dancers' movements gradually accelerate until they reach the quick rhythm of the Lezginka music.
- Banovsha (Azerbaijani: Bənövşə, meaning "Viola flower") represents how a violet grows from the ground, blooms, and fades. This dance is performed at Nowruz spring festivals in Azerbaijan.
- Bahar (Bahar rəqsi or Gülbaxçalar or Bahar gəldi or Bahar olsun): this dance is performed in Nowruz spring festivals in Azerbaijan by women. The dance consisted of 3 parts. This dance was composed by the Azerbaijani dancer and choreographer Alibaba Abdullayev. The music of this dance was composed by great Azerbaijani composer Jahangir Jahangirov.
- Ceyrani or Ceyran bala (Azerbaijani: ceyran, meaning "Gazelle", an Azeri given name for girls) is a dance, performed by both men and women, which symbolizes the gazelle's gracefulness and elegance.
- Chichekler, meaning "flowers" in Azeri, is an elegant dance that was created in 1910. This women's dance is typically performed in two different forms: slow and fast. The group of colorfully costumed dancers gathers together to collect flowers to display to the audience. The dancers form circles and triangles to the upbeat music. The dance also includes complex hand movements and spins.
- Choban Regsi (from Persian: Choopan, meaning "shepherd's dance") is a men's dance typical to rural areas. This energetic dance symbolizes the cheerful spirit of the shepherd who brings his herd to the valley. This dance was first created by the Azerbaijani dancer and choreographer Alibaba Abdullayev.
- Innabi (Azerbaijani: İnnabı, meaning "name of a fruit") is performed by one or two female dancers to exhibit a woman's airs and graces as well as coquetry.
- Gangi (Azerbaijani: Cəngi, meaning "related to war" (from Persian: Dgang جنگ, meaning "war")) is martial music that calls all people to unity, friendship, and invincibility.
- Lezginka (Azerbaijani: Ləzgi) is a national dance of Lezghins popular among many people in the Caucasus Mountains.
- Mirzayi (Azerbaijani: Mirzəyi) is traditionally played at wedding parties and performed by men and women with handkerchiefs in their hands.
- Nalbeki (Nəlbəki, meaning "saucer") is a women's dance performed with dance saucers and cups. This dance was composed by the Azerbaijani dancer and choreographer Alibaba Abdullayev. Alibaba Abdullayev was the first in the World to use the saucer and cups in a dance. This dance is played with two musics. The first music was composed by Azerbaijani composer Qylman Salahov. Second one was composed by Azerbaijani composer Telman Hajiyev.
- Ouch noumra, dourd noumra, besh noumra, alti noumra (Azerbaijani: 3 nömrə. 4 nömrə. 5 nömrə. 6 nömrə – meaning "Number 3, Number 4, Number 5, Number 6") are famous dance melodies composed in the second half of the 1920s in Baku. Dance 3 and 5, which have slow tempos and doleful melodies, are performed by women. Dances 4 and 6 have a slightly faster tempo and are performed by both women and men.
- Tarakama (Azerbaijani: Tərəkəmə) is a dance of a tribespeople performed by both men and women with arms extended and heads up.
- Vagzali (Azerbaijani: Vağzalı) is a dance for when the bride departs from her family house to the house of the bridegroom.
- Uzundara (Uzundərə) is a folk dance meaning “a long gauge”. It is a long dance performance. It was traditionally performed when the bride and bridegroom are on the road.
- Zorkhana (Persian: Zurkhaneh, meaning "house of strength") is a men's dance that symbolizes courage, bravery, and youthful enthusiasm.
- Sari Gelin (Sarı Gəlin) is a folk dance. This dance is performed under the music of Azerbaijani version of the song Sarı Gəlin.
- Gaitagi (Azerbaijani: Qaytağı) is a rapid and dynamic dance.
- Heyvagulu (Azerbaijani: Heyvagülü) was choreographed by the Seygah mugham.
- Uzundara (Uzundərə) is a historical Azerbaijani folk dance. Meaning “a long gauge”, is a long dance performance. It was traditionally performed when the bride and bridegroom are on the road. The melody of this dance was first processed and pitched by Azerbaijani composer Uzeyir Hajibeyov (1885–1948). Uzeyir Hajibeyov (1885–1948) used melody of Uzundere in his second operetta "O olmasın, bu olsun" (1911)
- Turajy (Turacı) is a women's dance that includes lyrics. This dance based on Mahur mugham.
- Yuz bir (Yüz bir, meaning "one hundred and one") is a little quick dance played by both women and men. The music of the dance based on Shushter mugham and played with Azerbaijani folk instrument Balaban. Shushter is longing and lyrical. One hundred and one is a mystical number belonging to the eastern realm. There is also a hypothesis that in ancient folk festivals in Azerbaijan, musicians created impromptu dances and numbered them in order not to forget. For example: (Azerbaijani: "Üç. Dörd. Beş. On dörd" meaning "Three. Four. Five. Fourteen").
- Sari Gelin (Sarı Gəlin) is an Azerbaijani folk dance. This dance is performed under the music of Azerbaijani version of the song Sarı Gəlin. The melody of the song was first processed and pitched by Azerbaijani composer Asaf Zeynally (1909–1932).
- Naz elama (Naz eləmə or Naznazı meaning "Don't flirt" or "Don't play") is dance with two heroes: a boy and a girl. The author of the music and structure of this dance was great Azerbaijani dancer and choreographer Alibaba Abdullayev. Starting from 1942, he performed this dance with Leyla Badirbeyli, later Amina Dilbazli, Shafiqa Amirova and Tutu Hamidova. This dance celebrates the feelings of love between two people. This love is shown by dance moves and facial expressions.
- Qaval (Qaval rəqsi) is a national dance played by women with a dayereh in her hand. This dance was composed by great Azerbaijani dancer and choreographer Alibaba Abdullayev while he was working in Azerbaijan State Dance and Song Ensemble. For the first time in 1959 dancer Emine Dilbazi performed this dance with the lyrical music of composer Gylman Salahov. Alibaba Abdullayev was the first to use the qaval in a dance. Great Azerbaijani composer Eldar Mansurov also composed music for (Qaval rəqsi).
- Qıtqılıda (Qıtqılıda rəqsi) is a historical and national woman's dance that originated in Azerbaijan in 1860–1870. This dance was first staged by famous Azerbaijani composer Uzeyir Hajibeyov in his second operetta O olmasın, bu olsun (1911). The creator and first performer of this dance was famous accordionist Teyyub Damirov. This dance was first processed and pitched in 1937 by Said Rustamov.
- Ganjlik (Gənclik or Bəy) is a male dance. This dance was composed by great Azerbaijani dancer and choreographer Alibaba Abdullayev in the 1950s. And first time performed by Azerbaijani dancer Ramiz Mammedov.
- Nagara (Nağaraçılar rəqsi) is a national Azerbaijani male dance with nagara (drum).This dance was composed by great Azerbaijani dancer and choreographer Alibaba Abdullayev. Alibaba Abdullayev was the first to use the Naqareh in a dance.
- Kochari (Köçəri) is a kind of Yalli, the historical and national dance of Azerbaijan. This dance is a rhythmic, mainly played with a balaban and nagara (drum).
- Mahsul (Məhsul): this dance was composed by great Azerbaijani dancer and choreographer Alibaba Abdullayev. The music of this dance was composed by Azerbaijani composer Jahangir Jahangirov.
- Bulaq bashinda (Bulaq başında): this dance was composed by great Azerbaijani dancer and choreographer Alibaba Abdullayev. The music of this dance was composed by Azerbaijani composer Jahangir Jahangirov.
- Azerbaijan Suite (Azerbaijani: Azərbaycan Suitası or Azərbaycan toyu): this dance was composed by great dancer and choreographer Tanxo Izrailov. The music of this dance was composed by Azerbaijani composer Tofig Guliyev.
- Agh chichek (Ağ çiçək): this dance composed by Azerbaijani dancer and choreographer Roza Jalilova. The music of this dance composed by great Azerbaijani composer Emin Sabitoglu
- Incelik (İncəlik) is a historical Azerbaijani dance. The music of this dance was composed by the great Azerbaijani composer Jahangir Jahangirov.
- Dostluq (Dostluq rəqsi): this dance was composed by a great Azerbaijani dancer and choreographer Alibaba Abdullayev in (1956). The music of this dance composed by great Azerbaijani composer Suleyman Alasgarov.
- Toy (Toy rəqsi meaning "wedding dance"): this dance was composed by a great Azerbaijani dancer and choreographer Alibaba Abdullayev and the music of dance composed by great Azerbaijani composer Jahangir Jahangirov.
- Qazakhi (Qazaxı rəqsi): national dance of Qazakh District of Azerbaijan. The music of the dance is based on Mahur mugham and first processed and pitched by great Azerbaijani composer Uzeyir Hajibeyov in 1936.
- Lyric dance (Lirik rəqs): this dance choreographed by great Azerbaijani dancer and choreographer Afaq Melikova and music of the dance was composed by great Azerbaijani composer Eldar Mansurov.
- Suzen Gizlar (Süzən qızlar): this dance was choreographed by Tanxo Izrailov and Afaq Melikova. The music of the dance was composed by great Azerbaijani composer Jahangir Jahangirov.
- Odlar Yurdu (meaning: The Land of Fire): this dance was choreographed by great Azerbaijani dancer and choreographer Afaq Melikova. The music of the dance was composed by great Azerbaijani composer Eldar Mansurov.
- Gobustan (Qobustan rəqsi): this dance was choreographed by great Azerbaijani dancer and choreographer Afaq Melikova. The music of the dance was composed by great Azerbaijani composer Eldar Mansurov.
- Ilk Bahar (İlk Bahar rəqsi): this dance was choreographed by Ilya Ilich Arbatov. The music of the dance was composed by great Azerbaijani composer Jahangir Jahangirov.

== During Nowruz ==
Nowruz (meaning "a new day" in Persian, spelled as Novruz in Azerbaijani) is an ancient celebration of the Iranian New Year and spring and the renewal and fertility to come. Nowruz is observed on the day of vernal equinox in Iran and as far east as Tajikistan and as far west as the Kurdish regions of Turkey. Novruz in Azerbaijan is a family holiday that ends with festive public dancing and other entertainment of folk bands.

== Musical archaeology ==
Archaeological research connects the musical culture of modern-day Azerbaijan with Mesolithic rock carvings depicting dancing people at the archaeological sites in Qobustan and Nakhchivan.

== See also ==
- Culture of Azerbaijan
- Music of Azerbaijan
- Turkish dance
- Iranian dance
