= Uzundara =

Folk dance from the South Caucasus region

- Native name: Armenian: Ուզունդարա; Azerbaijani: Uzundərə
- Genre: Traditional dance
- Time signature: 6/8 (7/8), 3/4 (12/8)
- Origin: Karabakh, Western Armenia (Erzurum)

Uzundara or ouzoundara (Armenian: Ուզունդարա; Azerbaijani: Uzundərə) is a lyrical Armenian and Azerbaijani dance traditionally performed by women. Today, the dance is famous throughout the South Caucasus region; in particular Armenia and Azerbaijan.

== Etymology and origin ==
The place of origin is either Nagorno-Karabakh, or Western Armenia (Erzurum). The origination of the dance is claimed by both Armenians and Azerbaijanis alike due to the fact that both nations lived in Karabakh, where the Uzundere valley is located. According to Azerbaijani scholars, the dance originates in a Uzundara valley between Aghdam and Baş Qərvənd in the region of Karabakh. According to another explanation, the dance was brought to the region by Armenians from Erzurum, who fled from the Ottoman Empire in 1828 during the Russian-Turkish war.

In Armenian, particularly in the western Armenian dialect "Uzundara" translates to "They wanted her, They took her". With "Uzun" being "they wanted (her)" and "Daran" 'They took (her)". It showcases the metaphor of a bride being taken from her family.

Translated from Azerbaijani, the word Uzundara means "long gorge" or "long valley". The word Uzundara itself comes from the word "Uzun", which is of Old Turkic origin and means "long", and the word "Dara", which is of Persian origin and means "gorge". Armenian ethnographer Srbuhi Lisitsian notes that "dara", in addition to a "gorge", can also mean a "pit".

== Performing ==
The dance is performed easily, smoothly. Circular strokes and small lateral steps are coordinated with gentle movements. It has a 3-part structure, with more active movement in the outer parts and smooth in the middle. A typical method of melodic development is the variation of two-, three- and four-bar motives.

According to Tamara Stepanovna Tkachenko, three elements alternate in Uzundara in the following order: moves in a circle, "syzme" (small, "floating" steps) and small movements forward or from side to side such as "khyrdalyk". She described those elements as "main elements of Azerbaijani female dance", while pointing out that "syzme" is an "integral part of Armenian dance". Tkachenko also noted that in Armenia, the lyrical dance of the bride was performed after the solemn dances of the matchmaker, parents, and groom, to the melodies of "Uzundara", "Nunufar" or "Rangi".

Melody of Uzundara dance at the opening of Khari Bulbul Music Festival in Shusha performed by kamancheh players
