= Aslan Tlebzu =

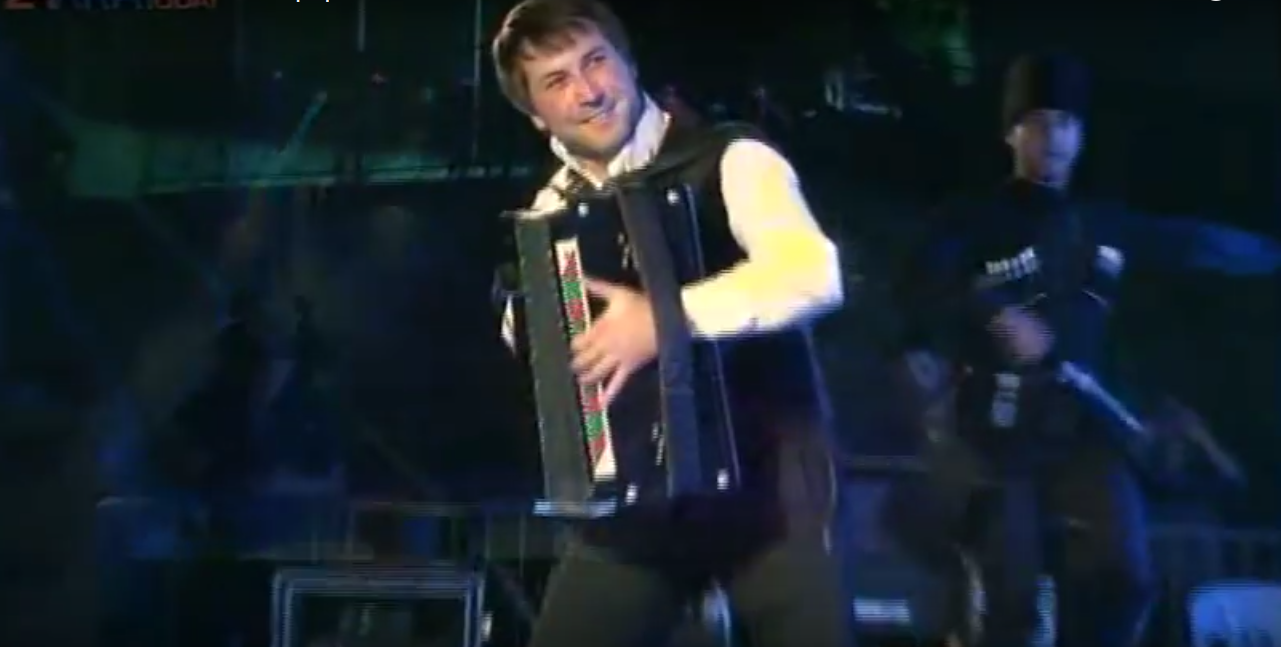
- Aslan Tlebzu at Kfar Kama in 2015

Background information
- Born: Aslan Nurdinovich Tlebzu; February 24, 1981 (age 45); Adygea, North Caucasia
- Genres: Circassian music
- Occupations: Musician, composer, record producer
- Instrument: Piano accordion
- Years active: 2000–present
- Label: Zvuk-M
- Awards: Honored Artist of the Republic of Adygea Honored Artist of the Karachay-Cherkess Republic

Aslan Tlebzu (Adyghe: ЛIыбзэу Аслъан [ɬʼəbzaw aːsɬaːn], Russian: Аслан Нурдинович Тлебзу, born 24 February 1981, Dzhidzhikhabl, Teuchezhsk, Adygea, USSR) is an Adyghe folk musician from North Caucasia.

Tlebzu was born in a small Circassian village in Adygea in 1981. He attended the Art Institute of the Adyghe State University in Maykop and after graduation performed as an accordionist with the Adygean State Folk Song Ensemble – Islamey. Since then he has released several albums and singles, collaborated with numerous artists and groups, and performed concerts in many countries, including Russia, Turkey, Jordan, Israel, and the UAE.

Tlebzu is signed to the Russian record label Zvuk-M: the largest in Southern Russia, and is one of the best-known Circassian folk musicians. In his homeland, Tlebzu has been awarded the ranks of Honored Artist of the Republic of Adygea and Honored Artist of the Karachay-Cherkess Republic.

== Circassian National Cultural Project - Freedom ==
In 2016, Tlebzu created a Circassian national cultural project named Freedom to promote and disseminate Circassian culture and folklore. The story of the Circassian nation was related in various performance art, utilizing song, dance, instrumental pieces and poetry. Both professional and amateur Circassian ensembles and artists, about 120 people in total, took part in the grand spectacle, which was sponsored by the Government of the Republic of Adygea.

Artists and ensembles who took part included Aslan Tlebzu, Zaur Nagoy, Svetlana Kushu, Zubeir Yewaz, School of Caucasian Dance Nart, Ensemble of Caucasian Dance Abreks, Ensemble Oshad, Folkloric Group Hatti, State Dance Ensemble of Karachay-Cherkessia Mercury, Ensemble of Circassian and Abkhazian Music and Dance Bzabza, Children’s Ensemble of Circassian Dance Zerdax, National Ensemble Ashemez, and Ballet Show Imperia.

After its successful premiere in Maykop in October 2016, Tlebzu’s spectacular musical-theatrical show was showcased at the Musical Theatre in Krasnodar in June 2017. The proceeds from these charity concerts were given to a children's charity.

== Discography ==
Albums

- ETHNO-Symphony (2013)
- Freedom (2018)

Singles

- Black Eyes (with Aidamir Mugu) (2005)
- Kafa Chikh (2010)
- Si Uarad (2011)
- Guasha G'az (2013)
- Highlanders (with Anzaur Mish) (2016)
- Circassian Sight (2017)
- Mermaid Tails (2019)

== See also ==
- Circassian music
- Music of Adygea
