= Khari Bulbul Music Festival =

Khari Bulbul Music Festival Xarıbülbül Musiqi Festivalı
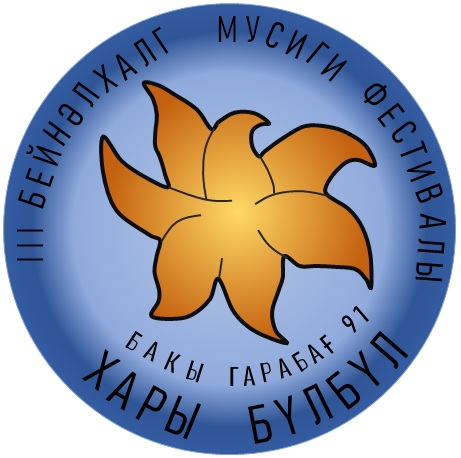
- Dates: May
- Locations: Shusha, Aghdam, Aghjabadi, Barda
- Years active: 1989–1991; 2021–present
- Founders: Ministry of Culture of the Azerbaijan SSR
- Organiser: Heydar Aliyev Foundation
- Website: https://xaribulbulfestival.az/

The Khari Bulbul Music Festival (Azerbaijani: Xarıbülbül Musiqi Festivalı) is an international music festival held in Shusha and other cities of the Karabakh region. The festival was first held in 1989 to commemorate the 100th anniversary of the Azerbaijani khananda Seyid Shushinski, and it was held annually until 1992, when the city was captured during the First Nagorno-Karabakh War. The festival was reinstated in Shusha, the cultural capital of Azerbaijan, on 12 May 2022, when Azerbaijan regained control over the city during the 2020 Nagorno-Karabakh war.

== History ==
The Khari Bulbul Music Festival was founded in 1989 to commemorate the 100th anniversary of the Azerbaijani khananda Seyid Shushinski. The festival's planning began in early 1989. It took place in May of the same year, during the flowering season of Shusha's symbolic Khari Bulbul flower (Ophrys caucasica). In addition to local performers, the 1989 festival featured music groups from the Kyrgyz SSR, Kazakh SSR, Bashkir ASSR, Lithuanian SSR, and Belarusian SSR, with approximately 100 people attending. The concerts were held in seven different venues on the Jidir Plain. The festival began with a performance by young singers aged 12 to 15, who sang the mugham "Karabakh Shikastasi". Competitions on Karabakh horses were held on the first day of the festival. The attendees were mostly Shusha residents.

=== The festival in 1990-1991 ===
In 1990, the Khari Bulbul Festival gained international status. Later, the event took place with the participation of Japan, the United States, Turkey, Germany, Israel, the Netherlands, Italy, Spain, Austria, Afghanistan and the USSR countries.

The festival could not be held in Shusha after the outbreak of the Nagorno-Karabakh conflict. It was held in Aghdam during the war, until the city was captured by Armenian forces. Among the performances at the Aghdam festival, the song "Sona Bulbullar" by People's Artist of Azerbaijan Gadir Rustamov, which is included in the "Golden Fund" of Azerbaijani music, stood out. Some festival concerts were held in other cities of Karabakh, including Barda and Aghjabadi. Around 170 people from all over the world attended the festival in total.

The third festival was held in 1991. Around 300 people from 25 countries attended the event. The festival was held in Mingachevir, from which participants travelled to Karabakh. The concerts were held in stadiums due to the large number of attendees. The final concerts of 1990-1991 were held at Baku's Republic Palace.

== Hiatus ==
The fourth festival, to be held on 15 May 1992, was to be the largest. It was planned for 500 people from more than 30 countries to attend. However, due to the outbreak of the Karabakh war and the capture of Shusha by Armenian forces on 8 May, the festival was cancelled.

== Restoration of the festival ==
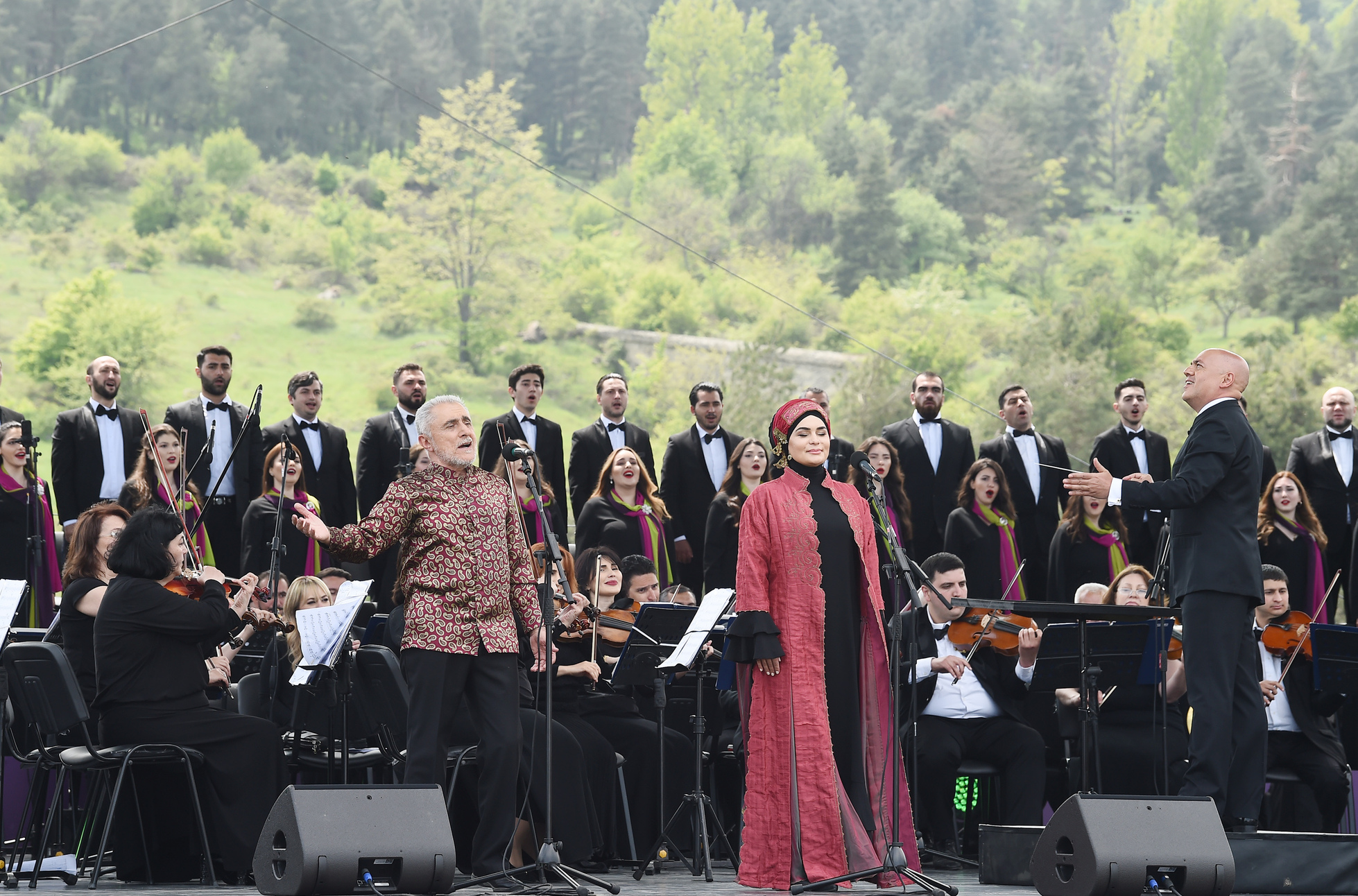
Performance of Alim Qasimov and Farghana Qasimova at Khari Bulbul Festival

Azerbaijan reclaimed Shusha on 8 November 2020. President Ilham Aliyev recalled the need to "revive" the Khari Bulbul Festival in Shusha and noted the need to re-establish the "tradition" of this folklore festival during a meeting with Azerbaijani Minister of Culture Anar Karimov in January 2021. The Vagif Poetry Days and the Khari Bulbul Festival were reinstated by Presidential order. The Heydar Aliyev Foundation subsequently organised the festival on 12–13 May 2021. The Khari Bulbul festival began with a speech by Azerbaijan's President, Ilham Aliyev. On 13 May, the festival concluded with a gala concert.

On 12–14 May 2022, the fifth Khari Bulbul Music Festival took place in Shusha. The festival's opening concert began with the "Vatan Suite" performed by the Azerbaijan State Song and Dance Ensemble. The song "Karabakh Shikastasi" was then performed by khanandas Ilkin Ahmadov, Babek Niftaliyev, and Sabina Arabli. The Turkic World Music and Folk Dance Ensemble represented Turkey at the festival and performed the "Van yöresi" folk dance.

== Gallery ==
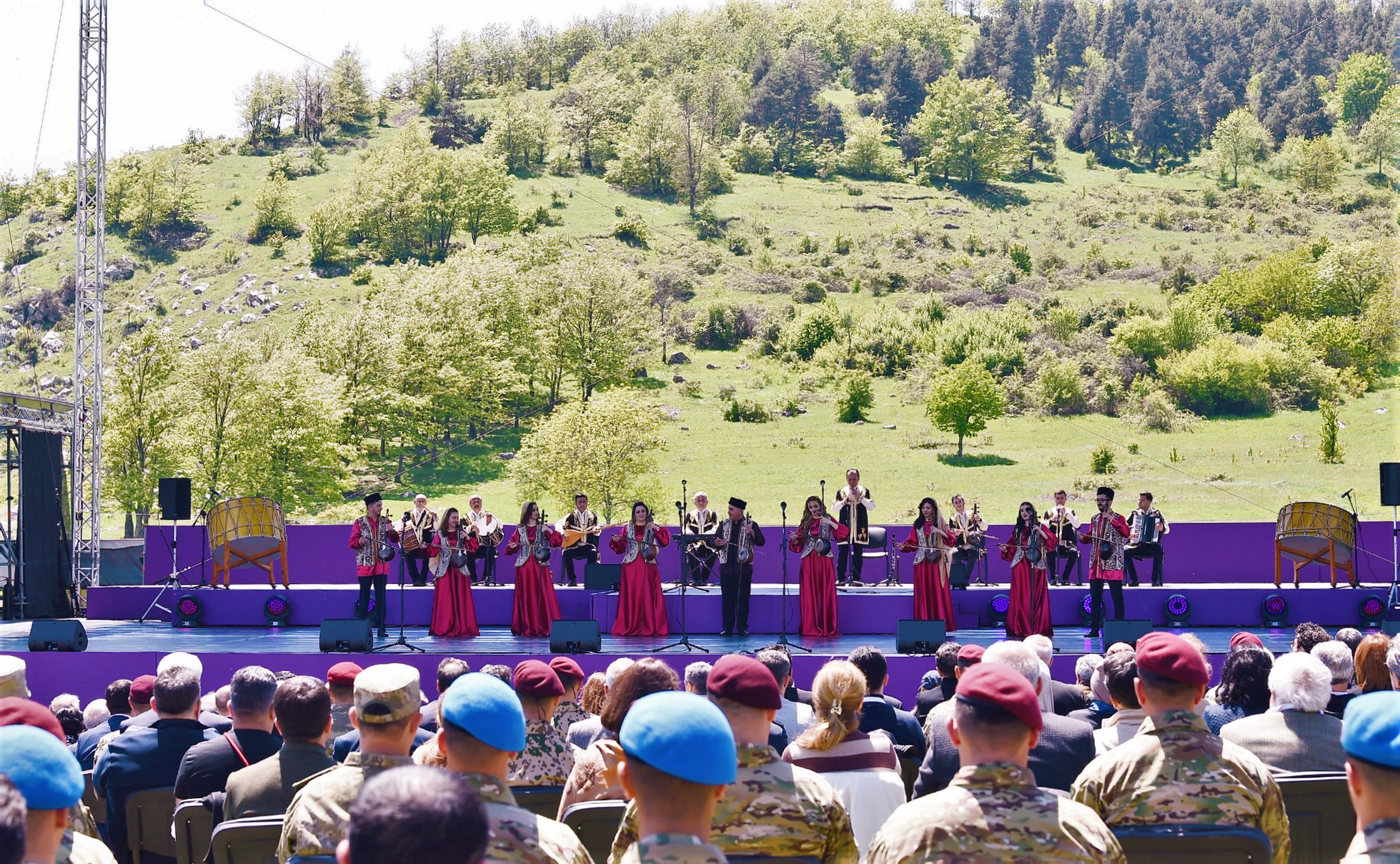
The kamancha ensemble, led by Elshan Mansurov, performs the folk dance melody "Uzundara"

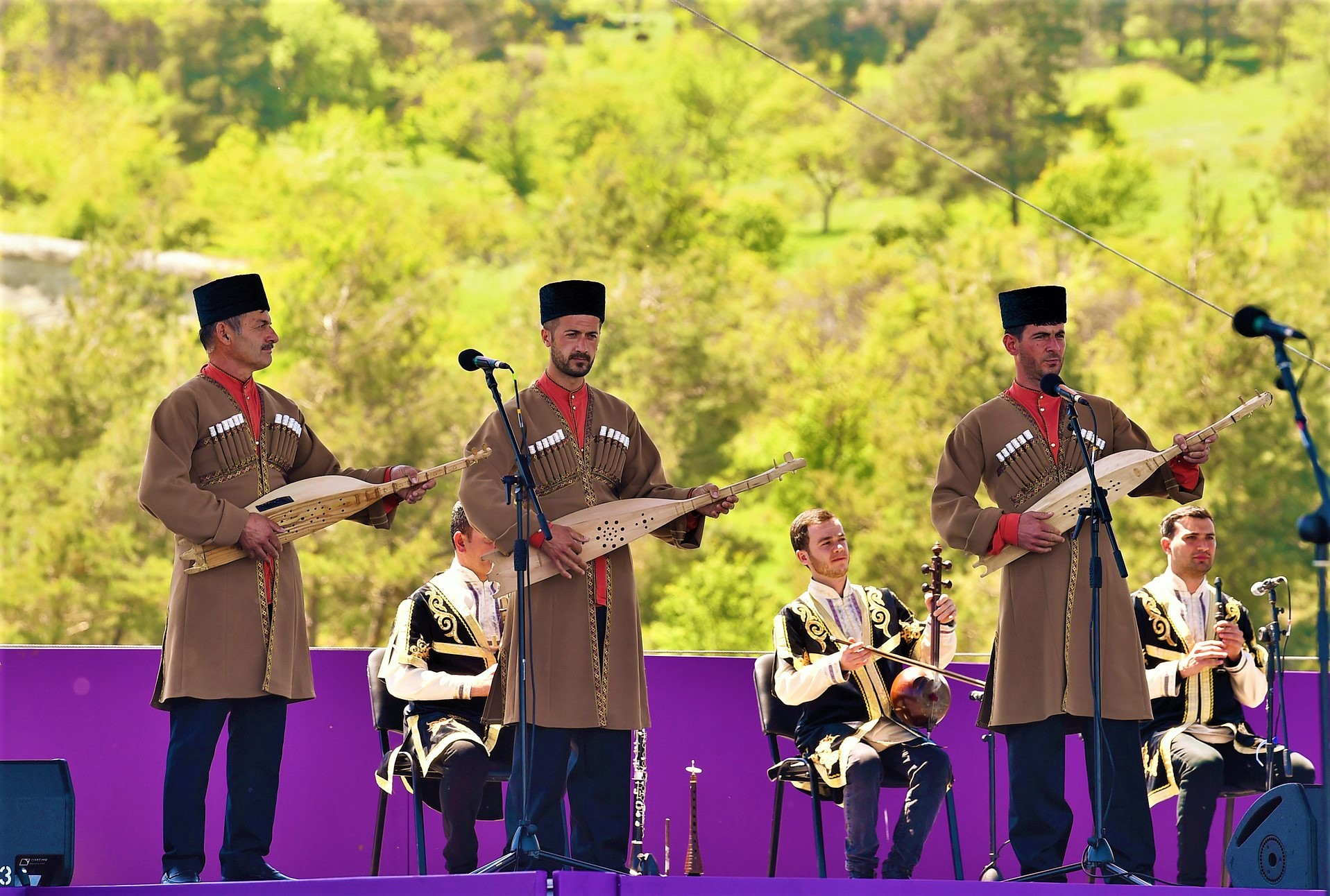
Jahan, an Avar folklore group, performs the song "Dun guri yo" on dambur

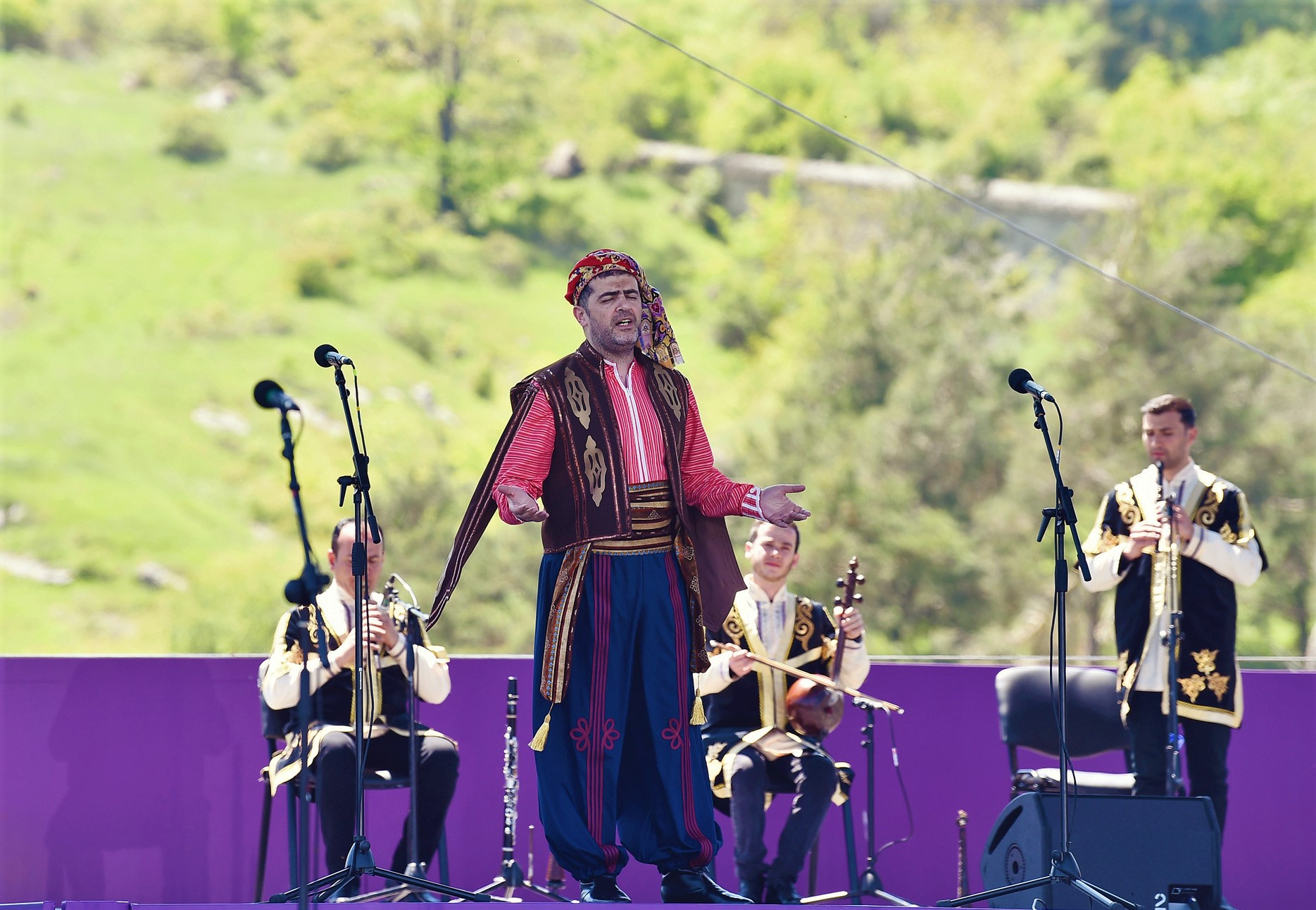
Tunar Rahmanoglu sings a Kurdish song "Rinda Min"

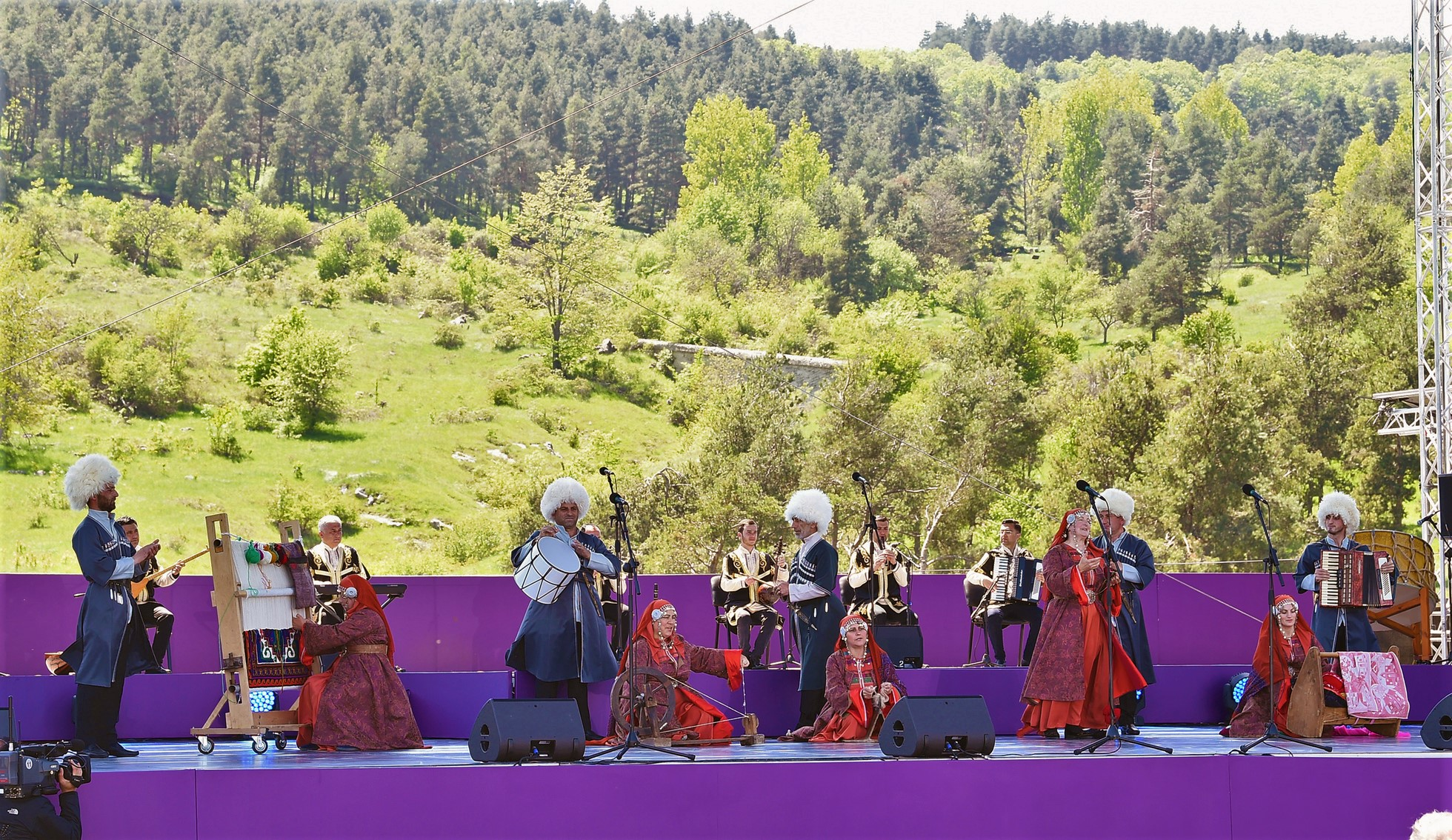
The "Mel" folk group performs a Lezgin folk song "Perizada"

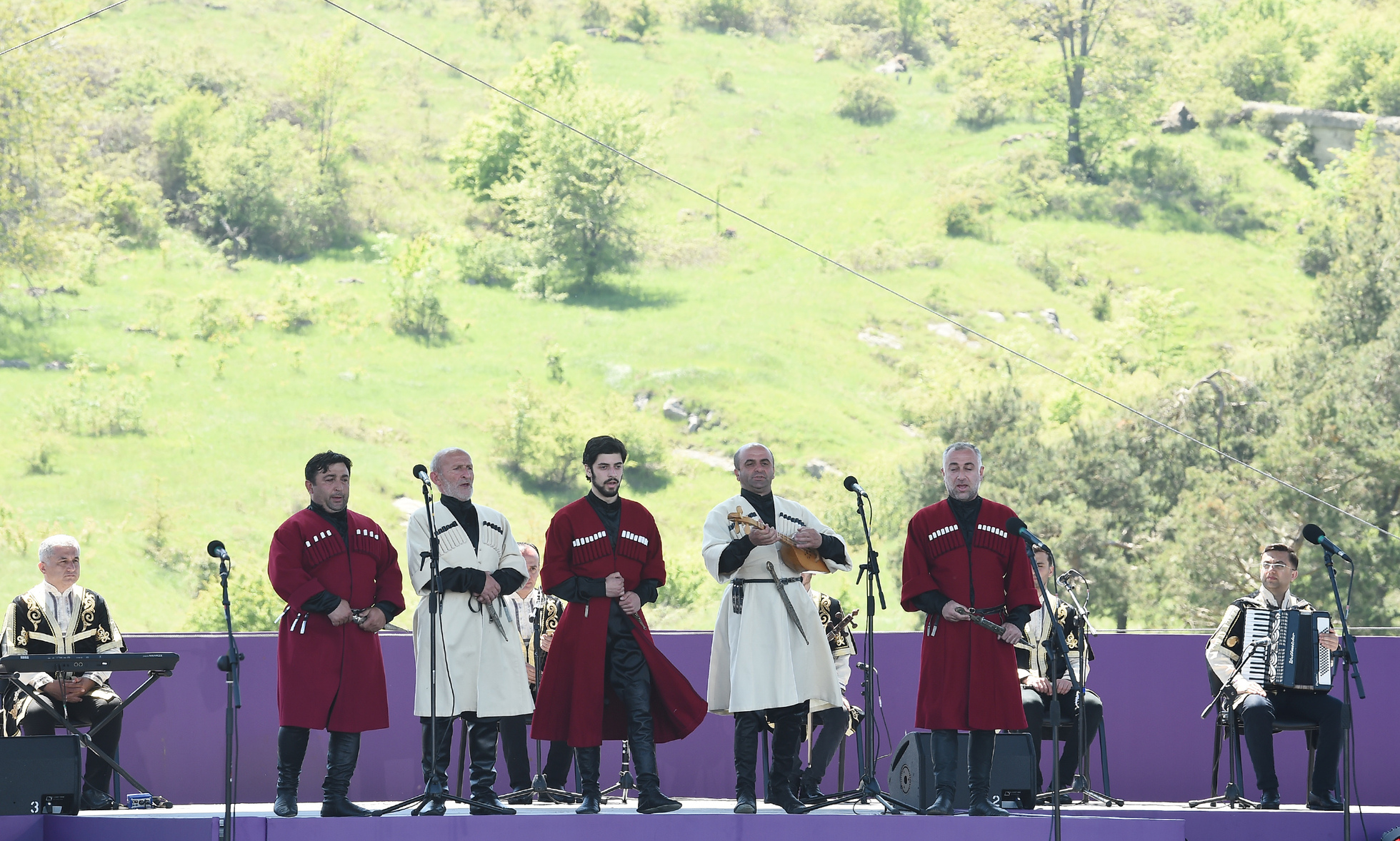
The Shividkatsa choir sings a Georgian folk song
