= Circassian dance =

Traditional dance of the North Caucasus people

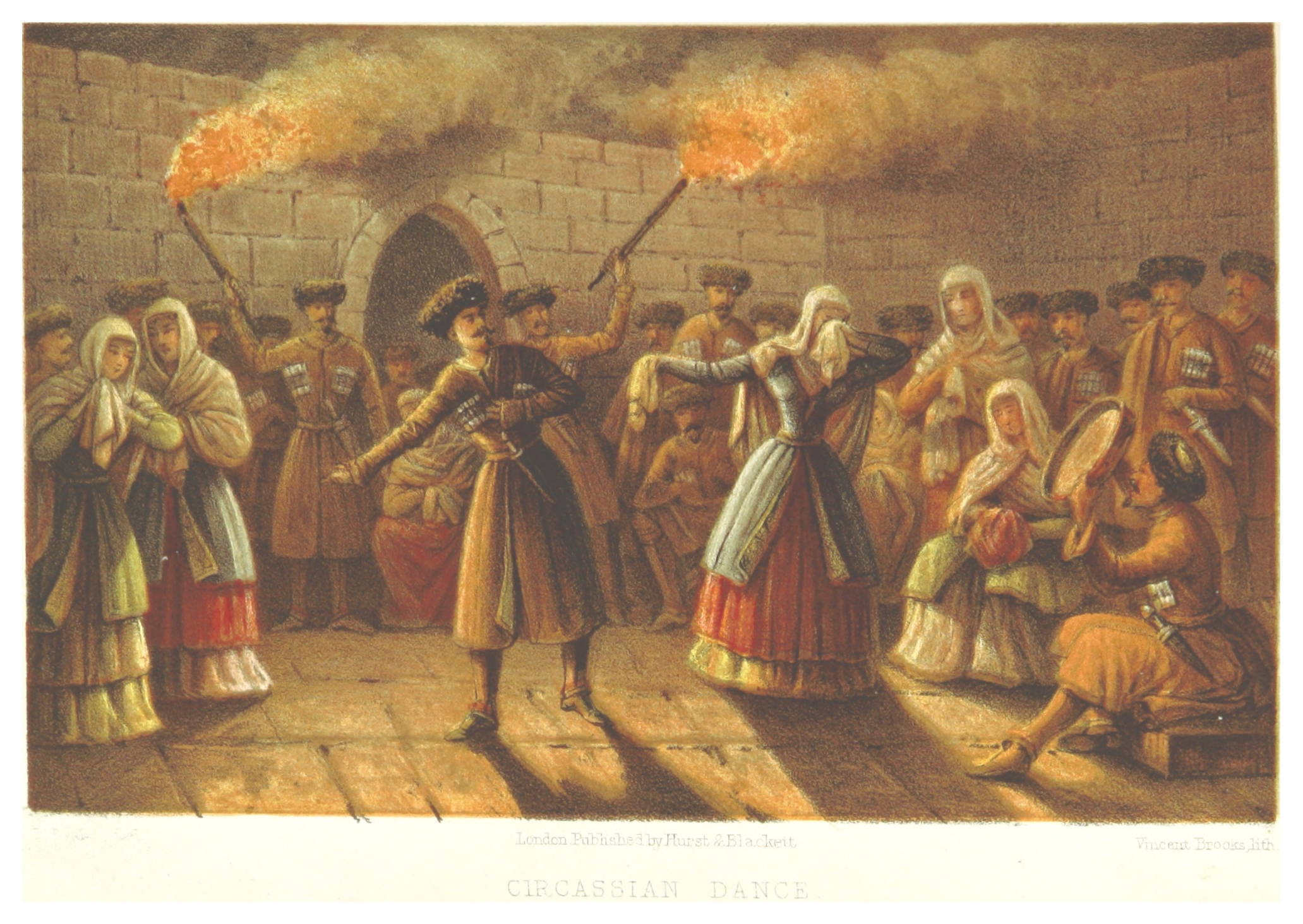
Circassian dance

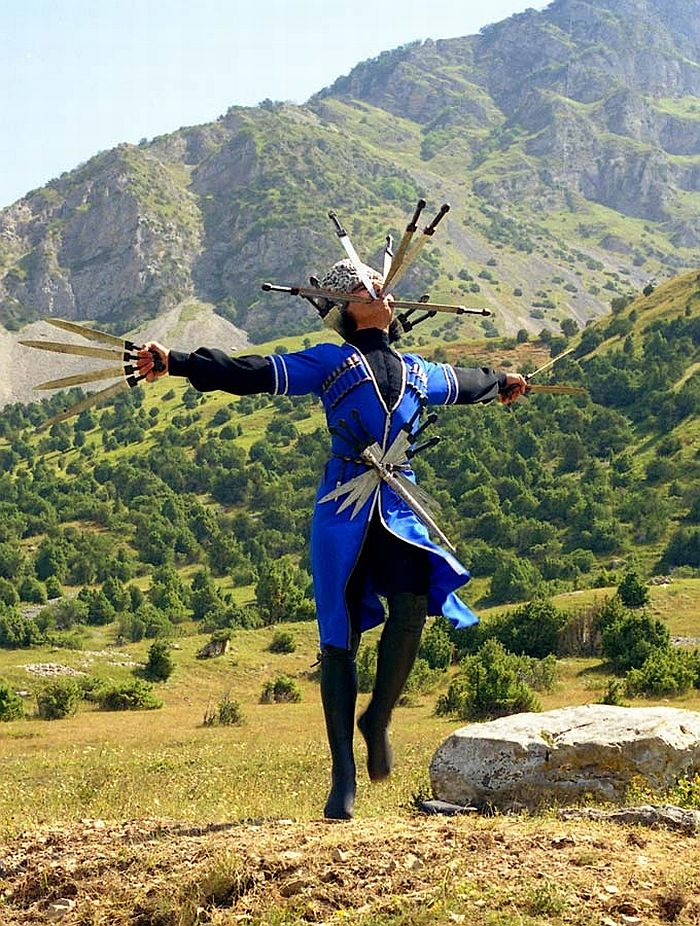
Circassian sword dance

Circassian dance is an important and defining part of the culture of Circassian people. The national dances evoke imagery of combat and courtship. They play a role in efforts to preserve Circassian tradition and culture in the diaspora. There are several dances including the Kabardinka. The version of this dance performed in Turkey is called Kafkas, from Kafkasya, the Turkish word for the Caucasus mountain region that was home to the Circassian people before the Circassian genocide. Another similar dance is called the Lezginka.

Circassian dances are often performed at national festivals and cultural celebrations.

== Dance education ==
Dancing ability is very important for social standing in Circassian communities, especially with regards to marriage and establishing romantic relationships. Children living in the Adyghe communities in Israel receive dance instruction from a young age as part of their school curriculum.

== Style and costumes ==
Circassian dances share some common traits with ballet: men dance on the tips of their toes wearing special leather boots. Women move very lightly, gliding across the floor without moving their heads or upper bodies.

Circassian men wear a black outfit called a cherkes on stage. It is a military style outfit with an imposing coat and bullet cartridges worn across the chest. Men often wear a dagger, and a dagger or sword may be incorporated into some of the dances.

== Characteristics and Competition Styles ==
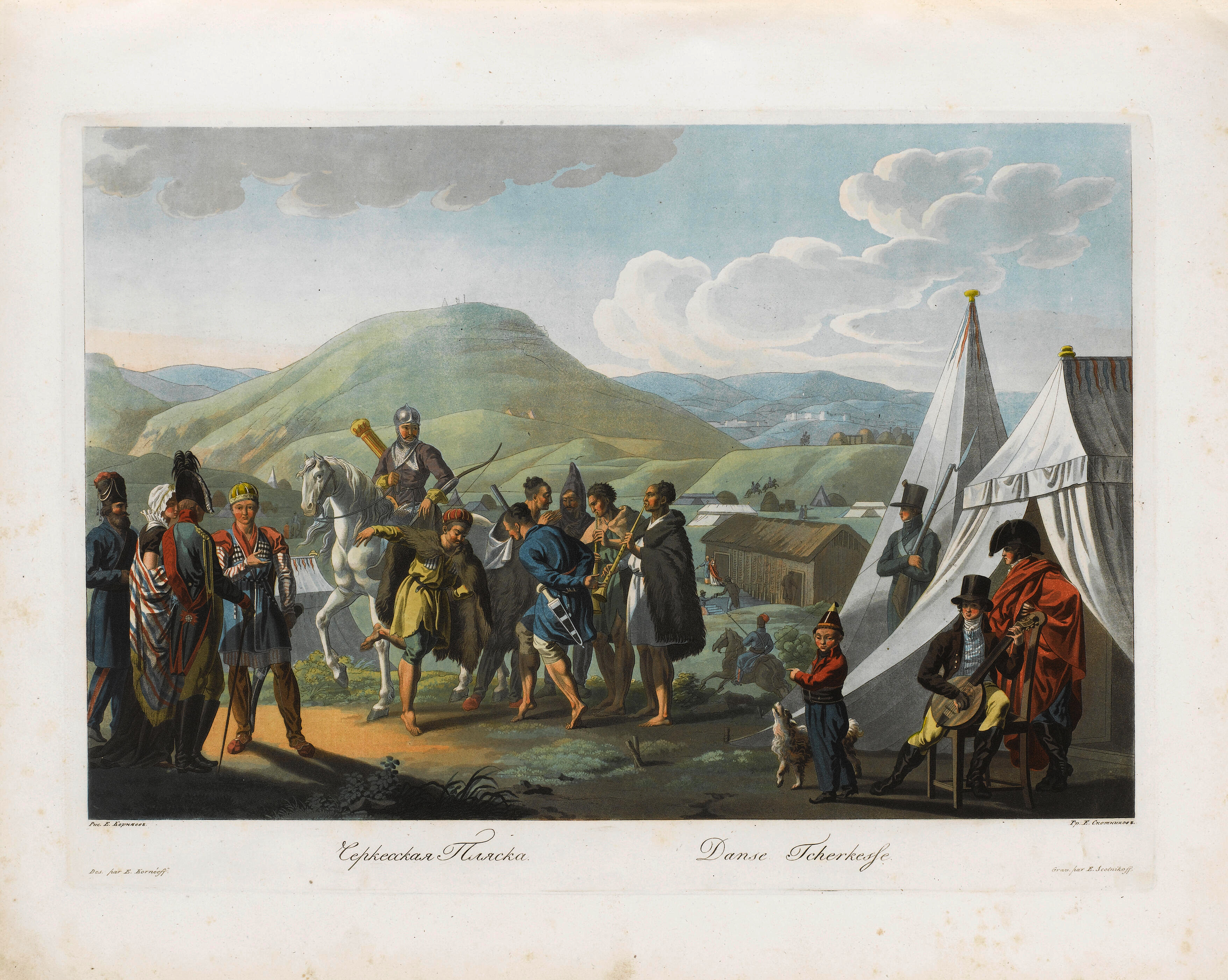
Circassian Dance by Yegor Karneyev, 1812

Beyond individual and partner styles, a distinct category of Circassian choreography is the "competition dance", which 19th-century authors often referred to as Lezginka or Islamey. Khan-Girey specifically identified this solo male performance style as Kafenyur. Reflecting the rigorous historical living conditions of the Circassian people, these dances are characterized by a disciplined, austere, and restrained structure that avoids overt emotional displays. Far from being mere entertainment, these performances served as a means of physical hardening and endurance training, allowing youth to demonstrate their will, character, and self-expression. The pinnacle of this artistry is the "dance on the toes", a technically demanding skill most frequently utilized within the Islamey.

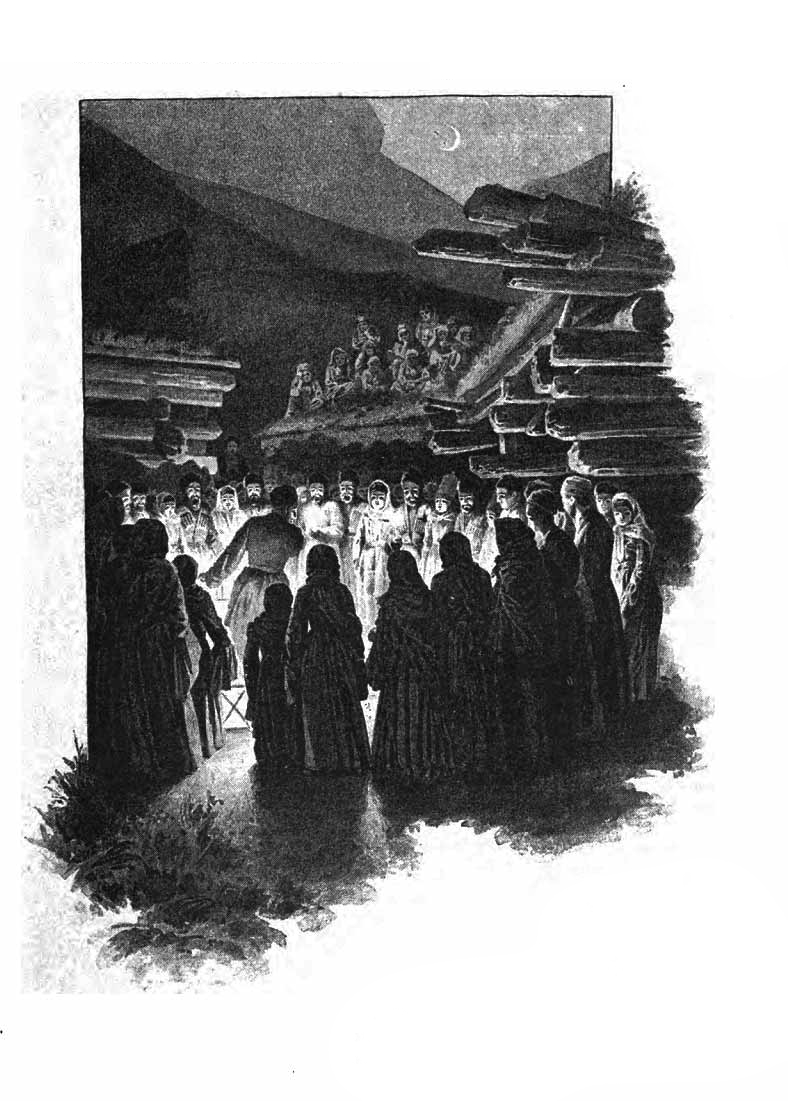
Circassian dance party in a circle drawn by Mechislav Dalkevich

The movements in these competition dances often incorporate imitative and military elements; for instance, the choreographic movement frequently referred to in technical literature by the Russian term zakladka symbolizes dodging a sword strike, while various arm gestures mimic the use of cold weapons, the gait of a horse, or the flight of an eagle. A typical competition begins with one dancer leaping into the center of a circle, followed by successive participants; some records even note specialized toe-dancing competitions between young men and women that could last up to thirty minutes. The technical difficulty is further heightened by the use of turned-in foot positions and small, agile leaps, requiring the performer to move with great lightness and celerity, often with hands held behind the back. Due to the historically dominant cultural position of the Circassians in the region, their dance and musical traditions significantly influenced neighboring peoples, most notably shaping the development of Cossack dance.

== Types of Circassian dance ==
Circassian dance is usually divided into three main categories; Wuj (mass circle dance), Qafa (slow-paced partner dance) and Islamey (fast-paced dance).

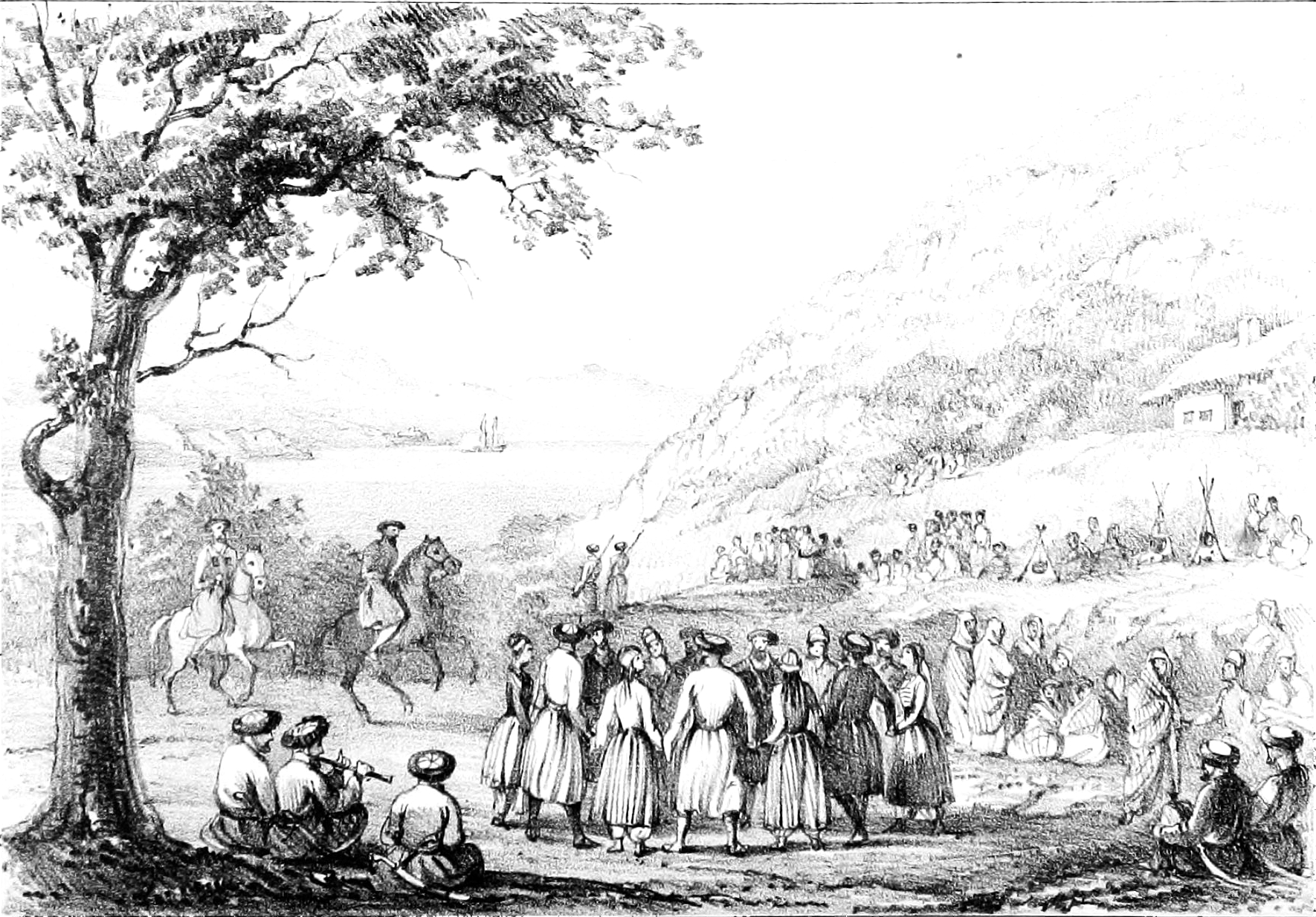
Circassian circle dance (Wuj) drawn by J. A. Longworth who visited Circassia in 1837.

=== Wuj (Удж) ===
Wuj is a group of mass circle dances that traditionally conclude Circassian celebrations. These dances are generally performed in a circular composition, often moving counter-clockwise. The term Wuj means "to move forward" or "to advance" in Circassian. Wuj dances are broadly divided into two categories: historical-ritual and ceremonial.

==== Ceremonial Wuj dances ====
These dances evolved to become social in nature, focusing on etiquette and communication between young men and women.

- Wuj-Khesh (Удж-хэш; lit. '"to lead out" or "invitation"') - performed at weddings and social gatherings. It is a primary way for young people to communicate publicly, with the name referring to the khatiyako leading the dancers into the circle.
- Wuj-Pukh (Удж-пыху; lit. 'to fall away') - A wedding dance. In Kabardian variations, the name also refers to a specific movement or figure within the dance where partners are changed.
- Nekhush-Wuj (Нэхущ-Удж; lit. 'Morning Wuj') - A dance associated with the dawn or early morning meaning, typically performed as festivities concluded.

==== Specialized and variant Wuj dances ====
These variations include specific social permissions or imitative movements.

- Wuj Turitu (Удж тIурытIу; lit. 'Pair Wuj') - Historically known as the most democratic dance because it allowed commoners to dance with aristocrats. It was unique for allowing partners to touch hands by intertwining fingers and exchange brief remarks.
- Shigha-Wuj (Шыгъэ-Удж; lit. 'Stallion's Wuj') - a fast-paced dance with specific music where the foot movements imitate a horse trotting.

==== Historical ritual Wuj dances ====
Historically, these dances were performed for religious or mythological purposes, often in honor of pagan deities.

- Wuj-Khurey (Удж-хъурей; lit. 'Circular Wuj') - Participants move rhythmically from left to right in a circle, serving as a solar symbol. It is characterized by rhythmic foot stomping and was historically considered the "apotheosis" of a festival, often performed for hours without stopping.
- Thashkho-Wuj (Тхьэшхуэудж; lit. 'Wuj of the Great God') - historically performed during ancient religious ceremonies and accompanied by mythological hymns.
- Shible-Wuj (Щыблэудж; lit. 'Wuj of the God of Thunder') - historically performed when it thundered or when someone was struck by lightning. Among the Ubykh and Shapsugs, the dance had specific accented foot taps.
- Thaghelej-Wuj (Тхьэгъэлэджудж) - Dedicated to the deity of agriculture and abundance which was historically performed during ritual festivals to ensure a good harvest.

=== Qafa (Къафэ) ===
Qafa is characterized by a slow, graceful, and dignified tempo. While the name literally translates to "dance" in a commanding sense in Kabardian, some researchers link its etymological roots to the word "Caucasus." Historically known as the "princely dance" or the "dance of the best," it was a priority for the upper classes and remains a symbol of high etiquette. The dance is defined by the "Qafa step" which is a smooth, gliding movement on the half-toes and a strict prohibition on touching. Partners maintain a respectful distance, treating the interaction as a "plastic spectacle" where emotions are conveyed through restraint rather than stunts. Every performance traditionally begins with a "do-za-do" figure, where partners pass each other on the left side to present themselves to the audience.

==== Aristocratic variants (Пщы-уэркъ Къафэ) ====
Historically reserved for the aristocratic class, these variations of Qafa represent the highest level of Circassian nobility and etiquette. The Princely Qafa (Пщы Къафэ) is a strict pair dance where individual families often possessed their own unique musical accompaniments to signify their status. The Noble Qafa (Уэркъ Къафэ) and the Dance of Circassian Aristocrats are classical forms that recreate the atmosphere of high-society salons or balls; in modern stage versions, these are often performed by three pairs with women wearing stilts and men dancing on high half-toes to emphasize a sense of grandeur.

==== Other variants ====
- Democratic Qafa - a variation that was accessible to commoners. Unlike the more rigid princely versions, this style could be performed as a mass dance while still maintaining the pair-based structure.
- Comic Qafa - a pair dance that incorporates elements of parody and satire, contrasting with the usually serious nature of the genre.
- Zaqo Qafa (Закъуэ Къафэ; lit. 'Solo Qafa') - historically performed by a single woman to demonstrate her virtues and talents to the community. While usually a public act of merit, a private version also existed where the dancer performed "before the mirror" as a form of self-expression.
- Qafa Quansha (Къафэ Къуаншэ) - preserved by the Circassian diaspora in Jordan. It is characterized by a softer, calmer performance style and is often associated with a sense of nostalgia for the North Caucasus.
- Zafaku (ЗэфакIу) - term used by the Western Circassians to refer to this slow, pair-based style of dance.
- Qafe Chih (Къафэ кӀыхь; lit. 'Long Qafa') - evolutionary stage form of the dance developed specifically for modern theatrical and scenic performances.

=== Islamey (Ислъэмей) ===
Islamey is a fast-paced "dance-play" and one of the three primary categories of Circassian dance. Historically originating as a pair dance for lovers, its name is derived from a Kabardian village. The movements are highly symbolic, representing the interaction between an eagle and a she-eagle. In all its variants, the dancers move relative to each other in a counter-clockwise direction. A notable cultural marker of the Islamey is the traditional practice of male dancers rolling up their sleeves before performing, signaling a high-energy and temperamental display. The distinctive melody of the dance served as the inspiration for Mily Balakirev's oriental fantasy piano piece, Islamey.

==== Kabardian Islamey ====
Associated with Eastern Kabardia, the Kabardian Islamey is a stately and lyrical theatrical story depicting a couple's relationship. The musical tempo fluctuates to reflect shifts in the dramatic mood between the lovers. It features solo parts for both partners, with the male dancer frequently rising onto his toes to demonstrate protection and skill. The footwork in this variant shares similarities with the Wuj.

==== Bzhedug Islamey ====
The Bzhedug Islamey originates from Western Circassia (Adygea) and is distinguished by a much faster, consistent tempo. Unlike the Kabardian version, rising to the toes is used sparingly as an emotional accent rather than a constant feature. Its movement patterns are broader and more rapid, closely resembling the mechanics of the Wuj.

=== Other dances ===
- Azheqafa (Ажэкъафэ; lit. 'Dance of the Goat') - ancient theatrical ritual featuring a character in a goat mask. The masked figure unexpectedly enters the circle to caricature the main dancers through satire and mimicry, testing their technical perfection and emotional restraint.
- Khuroma (Хъуромэ) - a ritual dance and song meaning "Christmas", prevalent among the Mozdok Kabardians. Historically, it was performed during winter celebrations while moving from house to house to offer blessings for abundance and fertility.
- Zeghelet (Зэгъэлъэт / Зыгъэлъат; lit. 'make it fly') - a fast improvisation where a youth and a girl communicate their feelings through the "language of dance."
- Laparisha (Лъапэрышэ) - an ancient dance specifically attributed to the choreography of the Ubykh people.
- Laparisa (Лъапэрисэ) - a fast-paced individual improvisation that requires a high level of technical precision and footwork.
- Lapeches (ЛъапэкIэс) - another variation of the fast individual dance style. Related fast variants characterized by specific steps include Lapeshes (ЛъапэщIэс), Laparif (Лъапэрыф), and Hakulyash (ХьэкIуляш).
- Hatu (Хьэту) and Yakuach (ЕкIуэкI) - the traditional dance of the Mozdok Kabardians. It is structured as a "dance-action" that transitions from a slow, Qafa-like section into a fast pace similar to the Islamey. Unlike the aristocratic Qafa, the Hatu is considered a more democratic form.
- Djilakhstaney Zekua (Джылахъстэней зекIуэ) - a traditional male "march" or dance originating from Lesser Kabardia.
- Dance with Daggers - a competitive, stunt-oriented performance. It is derived from the ancient game Sapakheta (сапахэта), in which boys practiced throwing daggers into the floor from various difficult and athletic positions.

==== Legend and heroic compositions ====
- Circassian Amazons (Lashin / Лашин): A mass dance inspired by legends of ancient female warriors and the era of matriarchy.
- Circassian Mamluks (Черкесские мамлюки): A choreographic composition reflecting the history and martial spirit of Circassian warrior-rulers in the Middle East.
- Narts (Нарты): A one-act ballet or choreographic work based on the characters and myths of the Nart Epic.
- Dance of the Black Sea Adyghes: A style reflecting the specific lifestyle and mentality of the Shapsug people.
- Hittite Dance (Хеттский танец): A modern staged piece exploring ancient historical themes.
- Legend of Sholokh (Сказание о Шоулэхъу): A specialized choreographic composition found in the repertoire of professional Circassian ensembles.

== See also ==
- Circassian music
