= Azerbaijan State Song and Dance Ensemble =

Song and dance ensemble

- Origin: Baku, Azerbaijan
- Years active: 1938–present

The Azerbaijan State Song and Dance Ensemble was created in 1938 by Uzeyir Hajibeyov, the founder of classic Azerbaijani music. Composers such as Said Rustamov, Jahangir Jahangirov, Vasif Adigozalov, Haji Khanmammadov, Telman Hajiyev and Ramiz Mirishli managed the ensemble along with Hajibeyov at various times. After Fikret Amirov’s death, the ensemble was renamed after him.

Prominent dance masters such as Amina Dilbazi, Tutu Hamidova, Boyukagha Mammadov, Roza Jalilova, Aliya Ramazanova, Afag Melikova, Kamil Dadashov, Alikram Aslanov, Nadir Mammadov and others were trained by the choreographic group of the ensemble.

The ensemble's repertoire consists of songs, dances, and choir compositions drawn from the music of Azerbaijan and other nations of the world. The Azerbaijan State Orchestra of National Instruments has functioned under the ensemble since January 2000.
