= Azerbaijan State Orchestra of Folk Instruments =

Azerbaijan State Orchestra of National Instruments
- Orchestra
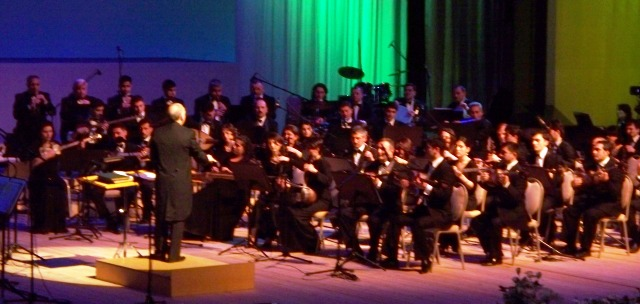
- Performance at International World of Mugam Festival, Baku, March 25, 2009
- Founded: 1931
- Location: Baku, Azerbaijan

The Azerbaijan State Orchestra of Folk Instruments (Azerbaijani: Səid Rüstəmov adına Azərbaycan Dövlət Xalq Çalğı Alətləri Orkestri) is the first notable orchestra of folk instruments in Azerbaijan, affiliated with the Azerbaijan State Philharmonic Society. It was created in 1931, on the initiative of Uzeyir Hajibeyov, founder of professional Azerbaijani music, according to principles of the Symphony Orchestra.

The Orchestra of Folk Instruments of Azerbaijan is the first orchestra of folk instruments of such kind in the Middle East. It was of great importance in the development of national musical culture of Azerbaijan. Initially the orchestra consisted of only five instruments: tar, kamancha, balaban, daf and naghara. Afterwards, gosha-naghara, zurna, tutak, canon, fortepiano and others were also included in it as well.

The orchestra is a permanent participant of many ceremonies on the state level. It successfully tours throughout the world and has performed in many prestigious international festivals. In 2004 and 2005, the orchestra was awarded the Gizil Chang premium of the 19th and 20th Fajr Festival of International Music held in Tehran.

== Conductors of the orchestra ==
- Hovhannes Ioahannesian (1931–1938)
- Said Rustamov (1935–1975)
- Aghaverdi Pashayev, Honored Art Worker of Azerbaijan, is the artistic manager and chief conductor of the orchestra.
