= Circassian music =

Circassian music refers to the traditional songs and instruments of the Circassians.

== Instruments ==
Circassian music is characterized by certain instruments, including:

- Pshine (Adyghe: Пшынэ), a type of Circassian accordion (related to the Georgian accordion) and its associated playing style.
- Pkhachich (Adyghe: ПхъэцӀыч), 2 sets of "wood blocks", each set containing about six pieces of wood held by hand, struck together to rhythmically accompany a song.
- Bereban, a drum known as 'Dhol'; in Adyghe it is called "Shontrip". It is struck by hand or with two short batons. Drummers' hands bleed when they train, or overplay.
- Pkhetaw, ('Wood-strike') a small wooden table-like instrument, hit with sticks for keeping tempo.
- Apa-pshine (Adyghe: Ӏапэпшынэ), a three string lute.
- Qamil (Adyghe: Къамыл), the Circassian flute.
- Shik'epshine (Adyghe: ШыкIэпшынэ), a Circassian stringed instrument also known as a horse-tail violin.

== Dances ==
While there is a culture of song-storytelling by travelling 'Woredi'o's or 'Song-tellers', Circassian music used most often today is closely tied to Circassian dance. There are several dances that are performed differently:

Qaashuo (Adyghe: Къашъо; Kabardian: Къафэ) is a piece in 4/4 time, and usually this piece demonstrates the relationship between the Sh'ale (boy) and the Pshashe (girl), a relationship which is built out of love, cooperation and strength. Usually 'Qafe' is the main social dance in a 'Djegu' (a Circassian dance gathering, literally meaning 'play'), and there are more than 100 qafes written by different Circassian artists, apart from the original traditional dances, and the individualised styles by each specialist in Circassian society.

Wygg (Adyghe: Удж) is a formal piece in 8/4 time, and is traditionally played before Challas are going to war, but nowadays it is usually played at the end of the Djegu involving all couples present. Usually it follows this rhythm: each eight time intervals a new musical phrase is introduced, and this piece may be repeated several times since more than ten different Wuigs are available. It is said it was also used as a form of worship, by circling a great tree that symbolises the forest God, Mez-i-t'ha. This 'rondel' type variant is the ancestor of the populasied dance known as The Circassian Circle danced by the Circassians' distant Celtic cousins after a cultural influx in the 18th century.

Tlleperush is a dance which originates from the Black Sea coastal area. It is a piece in 4/4 time, and the word "Tleperush" means "leg kick." Usually this piece is faster than Kafa and Widj, almost equal in tempo to known "Lezginka" but different in style and follows this rhythm: (1&2..3&4). This rhythm is produced by the Pshina, Pxachach, and Pkhetaw. Abkhazians have this dance too, and they call it "Apsua Koshara."

Zefauk' (Kabardian: Зэфакӏу) means "approach to each other". It is a piece in 4/4 time, and very similar to Kafa; the word "Zefauk" means (forward and backward) and it defines how it is danced. The dancers go 4 steps forward and another four backward; exactly as the Kafa but with different musical accompaniment.

Sheshen (Kabardian: Щэщэн) means "horse behaving", and is not related to the similar Chechen word. The dance is a fast piece in 4/4 time; this particular piece is played by pulling the bellows of the Pshina in and out rapidly to create an off beat rhythm.

Tllepech'as is an improvised fast dance. It is considered to be one of the ancient dance of the Circassians, "Tlepechas" meaning "stick toes in the ground." The dance is based on the Nart sagas; legendary figures that used to dance on their toes.

Zighelet (Russian: Загатлят) means "be the top". The dance is very energetic and fast, and it considered to be the fastest dance in the Caucasus. It is danced in pairs, in which the male dances fast and strong to show his skills, and the woman dances gentle but moves fast.

Hakull'ash' means "lame man move". It originated as a comedic dance to make the audience laugh, but with time it became part of the standard Circassian repertoire; it is done at a rapid tempo.

Lezginka is the Russian name given to the signature dance of Lezghi people of Daghestan. Daghestan dances, being of the mountains, are fast-paced, with sharp, angular movements both for women and men. The Adyghes (Circassians) have only adopted the men's dance into their repertoire, with the women doing almost nothing but provide a side attraction or stage audience by clapping or twirling while men perform more complex moves as display. The dance-step involves a raised bent-knee inward kick followed by a very quick shuffle for the men, whereas the women walk straight on tiptoe (among Adyghes) or follow men's active steps (among Daghestanis).

It is a favourite social dance, frequently used at weddings and gatherings of all Adyghe communities, or communities of the North Caucasus (Circassians), where the men and women stand in two half-moon circles in a ring, one leader for each, called the Hatiyaak'o, arranging which couple dances next according to requests from either gender. It is rude to refuse on either side. The men go out one by one in this order, circle once before standing in front of the lady of their choice, pre-notified by the ladies' Hatiyaak'o. The lady greets the gentleman by rising on her toes, opening her arms in a slight angle to the sides, delicately posing her fingertips, looking modestly down, and bowing only her head. He returns the greeting by bowing his head as he raises one arm and folds it at a right angle in front of his chest. She starts, he follows, both on tiptoe, sometimes on toe knuckles, to show off his skill. A man must always keep a woman in front of him, to his left. The idea is to 'protect' her on his non-combat arm's side, while his 'fighting' arm is outside, ready to 'strike' an outsider. They complete one circle before going to the centre, where he performs tricks and movements of his choice to impress her. She may or may not return his efforts by twirling in place or clapping for him, in time to the music. Eye contact must be maintained. It is very rude for a man to turn his back to the lady, or take his eyes off her, even if she is in front of him, a custom now obsolete among the Adyghes living with the peoples of the fundamentally male-dominant Middle East, where genders are culturally very segregated. Younger men have been seen to turn their backs to show off to the enthusiastically clapping other men.

In Daghestan, young men may use Lezginka as a men-only skill-contest type of dance, with a lot of energy, enthusiasm and soul fire. Women will use Lezginka as a skill contest too, but more rarely.

Qame-ch'as is the 'short-dagger' (Qame) dance. The dancer shows his skill with the "Qama", the Circassian dagger. It is a fast dance and it is a competition dance between men, but sometimes it is danced as solo. The Qame is also used in Persian martial arts.

Osh'ha c'hes or Bghi'ris is the mountaineers' (Mountain-Dwellers') dance. It is a very fast dance, danced by men showing their skills. The moves are hard and strong, showing the character of the mountaineers.

Apsni Apsua is the famous Abkhaz dance. Abkhazians are considered the origin of the Circassians; their nearest descendants are the Abzax, or Abaze-yex (literally "Abhaza-descending"). They are very close in blood, language, culture, and traditions with the Adyghe. In time, the Adyghe adopted their brothers' and neighbours' dances.

== Circassian artists ==
The Adyghe Anthem was originally composed by Iskhak Shumafovich Mashbash and Umar Khatsitsovich Tkhabisimov. However, after the diaspora, almost all Circassians immigrated to various countries, including Jordan, Syria and Turkey.

Notable Turkish artists include:

- Şhaguj Mehmet Can (instrumentalist)

- Thazpel Mustafa (instrumentalist)

- Oğuz Altay (instrumentalist)

- Semih Canbolat (instrumentalist)

Syria-based artists include:

Tambi Djemouk (instrumentalist)

Artists from Germany include:

Murat Kansat (instrumentalist)

Artists from Jordan include:

Saeed Bazoqa (Civil Engineer, Musician, Composer, Sound Engineer)

Firas Valentine, musician

Ivan Bakij, musician

Hasan Qayed, musician, producer, sound engineer

Orhan Bersiqu, instrumentalist

Rakan Qojas, instrumentalist

Blan Jalouqa, instrumentalist

Muhannad Nasip, instrumentalist

Yazan Stash, instrumentalist

Ahmad Aiy, musician

Timur Shawash, musician

== Composers ==
Composers of Circassian music differ in style but all are governed by the same theories of folkloric Circassian music.

Back in the Kavkas, there are many Pshinawas (players) who produce Circassian music such as:

- Hapcha Zaodin – Lead Accordionist for Kabardinka.
- Hasan Sokov – Lead Accordionist for Kabardinka.
- Aslan Leiv – Well known as Aslan Dudar.
- Aslan Tlebzu – Solo Accordionist.

In other countries, there are composers not just of Circassian music but also for different musical genres, including:

- Saeed Bazoqa – Solo Producer/Composer, Tech. manager at NART TV/Jordan, member of Kuban NGO/Jordan.
- Ahmad Aiy – Solo Producer/Composer and Lead Accordionist for Elbrus.

== See also ==
- Islamey: a piano piece based on the Circassian tune.
- Music of Adygea
