= Innaby =

Innaby (Azerbaijani: İnnabı) is an Azerbaijani national dance in 6/8 time. Young women and girls perform the dance at parties, weddings and holidays. It is often accompanied by a musical ensemble of sazandars consisting of folk musical instruments such as the tar (lute), kamancha and daf. In the early 20th century, it was considered as an everyday life dance. Its motions are slow and quiet, but its pace is moderately lively.
