= Music in Adygea =

Musical traditions of Adygea, Russia

The music of Adygea has a long history. Adygea is a republic in Russia. The Republic's national anthem was written by Iskhak Shumafovich Mashbash; music—by Umar Khatsitsovich Tkhabisimov.

Recorded Adygean music began prior to World War I, when folk musicians across the North Caucasus and Central Asia were commercially recorded. Many of these musicians, including the Adygean Magomet Khfgfudzh, an accordionist, have become cultural heroes to modern inhabitants.

Adygean music is closely related to Kabardian, Cherkess and Shapsugh music. The four groups are the main constituents of the Adiga (Circassian) nation. In the olden days, the musical lore was preserved and disseminated by the roving minstrels (Jegwak'we).

== 1990s renaissance ==
Aslhencheriy Nexay, People's Artist of the Russian Federation, graduated in composition from the Tbilisi Conservatoire in 1983. He composed the first Adigean opera 'The Sound of Distant Thunder' and wrote a number of songs and symphonies. He founded the Adigean State Folk Song Ensemble Islamey (Ислъамый) in 1991. It is one of a number of folk song groups that keep the old bard traditions alive, boasting of a rich repertoire of ancient and traditional songs. The Ensemble's mission also includes the rearrangement of folk songs and chants into modern formats to bestow contemporary relevance on them without sacrificing their authenticity and historical value. The Ensemble displayed its artistic wares in many festivals held in countries across Europe and Asia, and made several tours in countries where Circassian diasporas are concentrated. The Ensemble boasts of a number of world-class singers, including Susanna X'wak'we, Shemsudin Qwmiqw, and Rim Schawe. The choreography of the Ensemble is designed by Viktoria Yedij.

Zchiw Song Ensemble a.k.a. Jiu Ensemble (Жъыу; literally: Chorus) is an Adigean group that utilizes ancient musical instruments (no accordion or baraban), and plays authentic songs of the bards as they would have been heard prior to the 19th century. Its directors and principal personnel are Zamudin Ghwch'e and Zawir Neghwey, both singers of considerable talent. Neghwey also plays the shich'epshine (Circassian violin). Other singers of note include Artur Abida.

In the early 1990s Adygea saw the formation of a number of new musical institutions. These include two orchestras, one of which (Russkaya Udal), uses folk instruments (the other is the Adygeya Republic National Symphony Orchestra), and a chamber music theater. The Nalmes ensemble is a folk dance organization that has been dedicated to promoting and preserving Adygean music and dance since 1936.

The Union of Composers of the Republic of Adigea was established in 1992 under the leadership of Qaplhen Tiqwe. Member composers include Cheslav Anzeroqwe (Anzarokov), Aslhencheriy Nexay, Alla Sokolova, Bayzet Qeghezezh (Kagazezhev), Aslhen Gwt'e (Gotov), Tatyana Sukhova, and Murat X'wpe (Khupov). Their compositions and publications are detailed (in Russian) on the website of the Ministry of Culture of the Republic of Adigea.

== Adyghe Musical Instruments ==
- Kamil
- Shichepshin
- Pshina
- Pkhachich
- Dole
- Bjemiy
- Sirin
- Psinakheb
- Psinet'arku
- Epepsin
- Pheç'iç'
- Sot'irip'
- Adige Psin
- Nakire

== Dances of Adygea ==
- Wuig
- Tlaperuj
- Zefako
- Kafe/Quafa
- Shishen/Sheshen

== Adyghe musicians ==
- Aidamir Mugu
- Aslan Tlebzu

== See also ==
- Circassian Music

== Bibliography ==
- Bereghwn (Baragunov), V. H. and He'wpe, Zh., Narodnaya instrumentalnaya muzika adigov (cherkesov) [National Instrumental Music of the Circassians], Nalchik: El'-Fa, 2005. [600 pieces]
- Bereghwn (Baragunov), V. H. and Qardenghwsch' (Kardangushev), Z. P'. (compilers), Adige Weredxemre Pshinalhexemre, Yape Txilh. *Narodnie pesni i instrumentalnie naigrishi adigov, tom 1 [Circassian Songs and Instrumental Folk-Tunes, Vol. 1], Moscow: All-Union Book Publishing House 'Soviet Composer', 1980. Online. Available HTTP: (accessed 11 November 2007). [Edited by E. V. Gippius. This, and the other volumes in the series, are seminal works on Circassian musical lore. Some of the collected songs and chants are very ancient indeed]
- Adige Weredxemre Pshinalhexemre, Yet'wane Txilh. Narodnie pesni i instrumentalnie naigrishi adigov, tom 2 [Circassian Songs and Instrumental Folk-Tunes, Vol. 2], Moscow: All-Union Book Publishing House 'Soviet Composer', 1981.
- Adige Weredxemre Pshinalhexemre, Yeschane Txilh. Narodnie pesni i instrumentalnie naigrishi adigov, tom 3 [Circassian Songs and Instrumental Folk-Tunes, Vol. 3, Parts 1 and 2], Moscow: All-Union Book Publishing House 'Soviet Composer', 1986, 1990.
- Beshkok, M., Adigeiski folklorni tanets [Adigean Folkloric Dances], Maikop, 1990.
- Beshkok, M. I. and Nagaitseva, L. G., Adigeiski narodni tanets [Adigean Folk Dances], Maikop: Adigean Branch of the Krasnodar Book Press, 1982.
- Jaimoukha, Amjad, The Circassians: A Handbook, London: RoutledgeCurzon (Taylor & Francis); New York: Palgrave and Routledge, 2001.
- Jaimoukha, Amjad, Circassian Culture and Folklore: Hospitality Traditions, Cuisine, Festivals & Music (Kabardian, Cherkess, Adigean, Shapsugh & Diaspora), Bennett and Bloom, 2010.
- Jaimoukha, Amjad, 'The Circassian Minstrels'. Online. Available HTTP: (accessed 20 July 2008).
- Sokolova, A. N., 'Zhanrovaya klassifikatsiya adigskikh narodnikh pesen [Genre-Classification of Circassian National Songs]', in Kultura i bit adigov [The Culture and Way of Life of the Circassians], The Adigean Science and Research Institute, Maikop, issue 6, 1986.
- Zhanrovaya klassifikatsiya adigskikh narodnikh pesen [Genre-Classification of Circassian National Songs]', in Kultura i bit adigov [The Culture and Way of Life of the Circassians], The Adigean Science and Research Institute, Maikop, issue 7, 1988.
- Diskografiya adigskoi narodnoi muziki [Discography of Circassian National Music], Maikop, 1998. [Reference book on about 400 gramophone records issued in the period from the beginning of the 20th century to the end of the 1980s]
- Adyghe Traditional Polyphony and Its Transformation in Modern Conditions'. Online. Available HTTP: (accessed 1 February 2008).
- Music as a Medicine for Adyghs', in R. Kopiez, A. C. Lehmann, I. Wolther and C. Wolf (eds), Proceedings of the Fifth Triennial European Society for the Cognitive Sciences of Music Conference (ESCOM5), Hanover University of Music and Drama, 8–13 September 2003, pp 160–2. Online. Available HTTP: (accessed 9 June 2008).
- The Caucasian-Scottish Relations through the Prism of the Fiddle and Dance Music', paper presented at North Atlantic Fiddle Convention, The Elphinstone Institute, University of Aberdeen, July 2006.
- Thebisim (Tkhabisimov), W., Gwm yi Weredxer [Songs of the Heart], Maikop, 1983.
- Siy Wered–Xekw: Weredxer [My Song–Country: Songs], Maikop, 1989.
- Tlekhuch, A. M., 'Istoki i osobennosti razvitiya adigeiskoi muzikalnoi kulturi [Sources and Features of the Development of the Adigean Music Culture]', in Kultura i bit adigov [The Culture and Way of Life of the Circassians], The Adigean Science and Research Institute, Maikop, issue 8, 1991.
