= Haji Khanmammadov =

Haji Khanmammadov Hacı Xanməmmədov
- Born: June 15, 1918; Derbent, Dagestan Oblast, RSFSR
- Died: April 7, 2005 (aged 86); Baku, Azerbaijan
- Occupations: conductor, composer
- Years active: 1934–2005
- Awards

Haji Dadash oglu Khanmammadov (Azerbaijani: Hacı Xanməmmədov) (June 15, 1918, Derbent – April 7, 2005, Baku) was an Azerbaijani and Soviet composer. He is best known for writing the first concertos for the Azeri stringed folk instruments tar and kamancheh.

== Early life ==
Khanmammadov was born in Derbent (present-day Dagestan, Russia) and began studying tar at age 10. In 1932, the boy's life experienced a major change when his father and uncle were arrested during the Great Purge and permanently exiled to Siberia due to owning land. After Khanmammadov graduated from middle school, his mother, who was struggling to take care of six children, sent him to Baku to find Uzeyir Hajibeyov, an Azerbaijani composer known for his patronage of the arts. Indeed, Hajibeyov did provide lodging for the boy, and after being convinced of his musical abilities, the composer enrolled him in the Asaf Zeynally Music College. Khanmammadov would go on to develop into a fine artist.

== Contributions ==
Khanmammadov composed his first song, Gozal pari ("Beautiful Nymph") in 1942. In 1946 he was sent to Tabriz, then ruled by the Soviet-backed Azerbaijan People's Government to found a philharmonic orchestra but after the Soviets' withdrawal, returned to Baku. In 1947, Khanmammadov was admitted to the Azerbaijan State Conservatory to study folk music and musical composition taught by Hajibeyov and Gara Garayev respectively. He graduated in 1952. It was Garayev who challenged him to write a concerto for tar and symphonic orchestra for his graduation piece.

Khanmammadov also wrote two successful musical comedies: Bir dagiga ("One Minute", 1961; lyrics by Maharram Alizadeh) about the life of oil workers; and Butun arlar yakhshidir ("All Husbands Are Good", 1971; lyrics by Alexander Khaldeyev in Russian). He also composed about 150 vocal songs, many of which were written specifically for the plaintive voice of Shovkat Alakbarova.

In addition to his work as a composer, Khanmammadov was involved in administration as Director of the Azerbaijan Musical Comedy Theatre in 1944–1948), Artistic Director of the Azerbaijan State Song and Dance Ensemble in 1952–1954, and Director of the Azerbaijan State Philharmonic Society in 1966–1968.

== Recognition ==
Khanmammadov's contribution to Azerbaijani music was acknowledged on the state level with the following awards: Honorary Art Worker of Azerbaijan (1967), People's Artist of Azerbaijan (1988), Professor of the Azerbaijan State Conservatory (1993), Order of Honor (1998), and the coveted Presidential monthly benefit since 2001.

Khanmammadov was 87 when he died.
