= Abayi =

Azerbaijani dance

Abayi (Azerbaijani: Abayı) is an Azerbaijani dance with its origins in the Shaki and Zaqatala regions of Azerbaijan. The subject matter of the dance is middle age.

In this area middle-aged people are called "Abayi" and this kind of dance is generally performed by middle-aged men or women. Creators of the melody of this dance are the Shaki composers. It's a little exaggerated and funny and has a slow dancing tempo. This kind of dance used to be performed in groups, but later changed to an individual dance. Traditional Azerbaijani musical instruments such as a tar, kamancha, saz, daf are used in this dance style.

This form of dance not only entertains, but also brings many health benefits, such as improving the health of the cardiovascular system, increasing flexibility and coordination, strengthening bones and muscles, increasing endurance and reducing stress and anxiety.
