= Fətəli xan =

Human settlement in Azerbaijan

Coordinates: 41°22′N 48°31′E

Fətəli xan is a municipality in the Quba Rayon of Azerbaijan. The municipality is named in honor of Azerbaijani prime minister Fatali Khan Khoyski.
