= Baş Qərvənd =

- Location within Azerbaijan
- Coordinates: 40°08′32″N 47°00′53″E
- Country: Azerbaijan
- District: Agdam
- Time zone: UTC+4 (AZT)

Baş Qərvənd (Bash Qarvand or Bash Karvand) is a village in the Agdam District of Azerbaijan.
