= Said Rustamov =

Soviet composer (1907–1983)

Said Rustamov Səid Rüstəmov
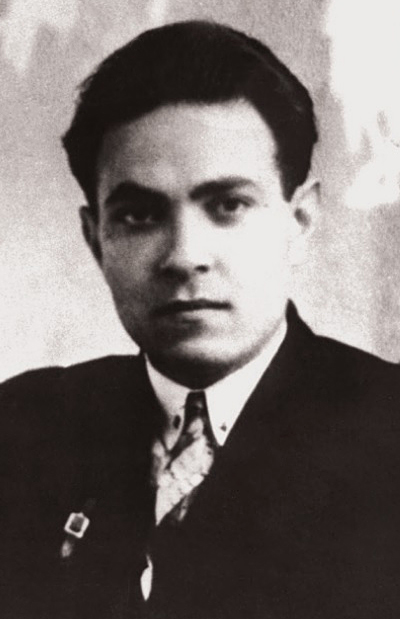
- Rustamov in 1930

Background information
- Born: 12 May 1907; Yerevan, Russian Empire
- Died: 10 June 1983 (aged 76) Baku, Azerbaijan SSR, Soviet Union
- Occupations: Composer, conductor, pedagogue
- Years active: 1930–1983

Said Rustamov (Azerbaijani: Səid Rüstəmov), born Mir-Jabbar Ali oglu Seyid-Rustamzadeh (12 May 1907, Yerevan – 10 June 1983, Baku), was a Soviet and Azerbaijani composer, conductor and pedagogue.

== Life and contributions ==
Said Rustamov was born in Yerevan where he spent his early years and went to primary school. He was the youngest of the family's four children. After his father's death and his mother's second marriage, he was taken in and brought up by his older brother, who had been married by that time. In 1918, as a result of ethnic tensions in Yerevan, his brother was murdered. Rustamov's sister-in-law fled with the rest of her family, including himself, to Turkey. In 1919, they moved to Ganja, then Agdash and finally settled in Baku, where young Rustamov got admitted to a teachers seminary. As a teenager, he developed an interest in music and visual arts. His musical talent was noticed by one of his teachers, who introduced him to composer Uzeyir Hajibeyov. Hajibeyov arranged for the boy's enrolment in a tar class at a music academy. At the same time, Rustamov further pursued his career in teaching and graduated from the Azerbaijani State Pedagogical Institute in 1932. Around 1930, he married Bika, a nurse whom he had met while living in Agdash. Together, they had four children (two sons and two daughters), all of whom would have been trained in professional music later in their lives.

Rustamov published textbooks on note acquisition and the instruction of tar. His monographs include Azerbaijani Folk Dances, Azerbaijani Folk Songs and Azerbaijani Ashig Songs. He also wrote children's poems, many of which became part of Azerbaijani school curricula. In 1935, he became the director and conductor of the newly established and unique folk instrument ensemble, and remained one for the next 40 years. In 1945, he was appointed director of the Fioletov Club Song and Dance Ensemble and, in 1951, of the Azerbaijan State Song and Dance Ensemble. In 1948–1953, he was Chairman of the Composers Union of Azerbaijan. In 1951, he received the Stalin Prize, the highest-ranking award in the Soviet Union. In 1957, he became People's Artiste of the Azerbaijan SSR.

During his career in music, Rustamov composed hundreds of musical pieces, including sheet music for popular operettas and accompaniment for many theatrical plays, as well as suites, marches, cantatas, etc.

== See also ==
- List of People's Artistes of the Azerbaijan SSR
