= Roza Jalilova =

Azerbaijani dancer (1929–2025)

- Roza Cəlilova
- Jalilova in 1950
- Born: Roza Ismayil gizi Jalilova; 17 May 1929; Quba, Azerbaijan SSR, Transcaucasian SFSR, USSR
- Died: 19 November 2025 (aged 96)
- Occupation(s): Dancer, choreographer
- Awards: Honored Artist of the USSR, People's Artist of Azerbaijan, Sharaf Order, Shohrat Order

Roza Ismayil gizi Jalilova (Azerbaijani: Roza İsmayıl qızı Cəlilova; 17 May 1929 – 19 November 2025) was an Azerbaijani dancer, choreographer, and ballet master who was an Honored Artist of the USSR (1959), People's Artist of the Republic of Azerbaijan (2007), and Chevalier of the Sharaf and Shohrat Orders.

== Early life and education ==
Roza Jalilova was born on 17 May 1929 in Quba. In 1937, Jalilova went to the first grade of school No. 132. When she was 9 years old, her father enrolled her in the Baku School of Choreography, in the class of Sara Miraliyeva. After graduating from the Baku Choreographic School in 1945, she became a soloist of the Mirza Fatali Akhundov Opera and Ballet Theater.

== Career ==
In 1949, Jalilova became a soloist of the Song and Dance Ensemble of the Azerbaijan State Philharmonic Society named after Muslim Magomayev. In August 1951, Jalilova was among the artists representing the Soviet government at the 3rd World Festival of Youth and Students held in Berlin with the participation of 105 countries. For over 30 years, Jalilova represented Azerbaijan at many international festivals that took place in Canada, China, USA, Turkey, Iraq, Ethiopia, and Morocco.

In 1965, Jalilova was appointed a leader of the dance group of the Song and Dance Ensemble, leaving the group in 1974. In various years, she organized folk groups in Nakhchivan, Shamakhi, Jabrail, Saatly and Lankaran.

In 1989, Jalilova created the "Gulistan" song and dance ensemble, and then the "Sevinj" ensemble. In 1991, "Gulistan" became the first Azerbaijani dance group to visit the United States.

For many years, Jalilova worked as a teacher of the Arts Gymnasium at the Azerbaijan National Conservatory, educating many famous dancers.

In 2019, the President of Azerbaijan Ilham Aliyev signed an order awarding the Shohrat Order for her merits in the development and promotion of Azerbaijani dance art.

== Personal life and death ==
In 1956, Jalilova married and gave birth to her son, Zahid, that same year.

Jalilova died on 19 November 2025, at the age of 96.

== Awards and honors ==
- Honored Artist of the USSR, 1959
- People's Artist of Azerbaijan 2007
- Sharaf Order
- Shohrat Order, 2019

Galas honoring Jalilova were held at the Azerbaijan State Philharmonic Society in Baku in 2014 and 2019.
