= Baku Choreography Academy =

Choreography education facility in Baku

Baku Choreography Academy (Azerbaijani: Bakı Xoreoqrafiya Akademiyası), BCA for short, formally Baku Choreography School (Azerbaijani: Bakı Xoreoqrafiya Məktəbi), is a high school in Baku, Azerbaijan, specialized in general, secondary and higher education programs in the field of choreography.

Baku Choreography Academy was established on April 30, 2014, by the decree of the President of the Republic of Azerbaijan Ilham Aliyev. It was established based on the Baku Choreography School.

The Baku Choreography Academy was established to ensure the development of highly qualified personnel in choreography. It was established to provide the need of developing the choreographic art traditions in the Azerbaijan.

On August 1, 2014, the President of the Republic of Azerbaijan signed a decree to provide design works related to the construction of the Baku Choreographic Academy building. According to the decree, 2 million Azerbaijani manats were allocated to the Ministry of Culture and Tourism of the Republic of Azerbaijan from the Reserve Fund of the President of the Republic of Azerbaijan.

== Educational Programs ==
According to the Charter approved by Decree No. 432 of December 26, 2014, the Academy offers educational programs at the general education level (primary, general secondary, and full secondary), secondary specialization, and higher education levels (Bachelor's, Master's, and Doctorate degrees), as well as relevant supplementary education programs (specialization, retraining, internships and professional development, repeating higher and secondary education, and diploma enhancement). Since the terminology of ballet is derived from French, students learn French from their first year until graduation. In addition to the general subjects taught in secondary schools, the subjects of ballet, historical family dances, folk dances, and classical and national dances are taught at an advanced level.
