= Lezginka =

Variety of North Caucasian dances

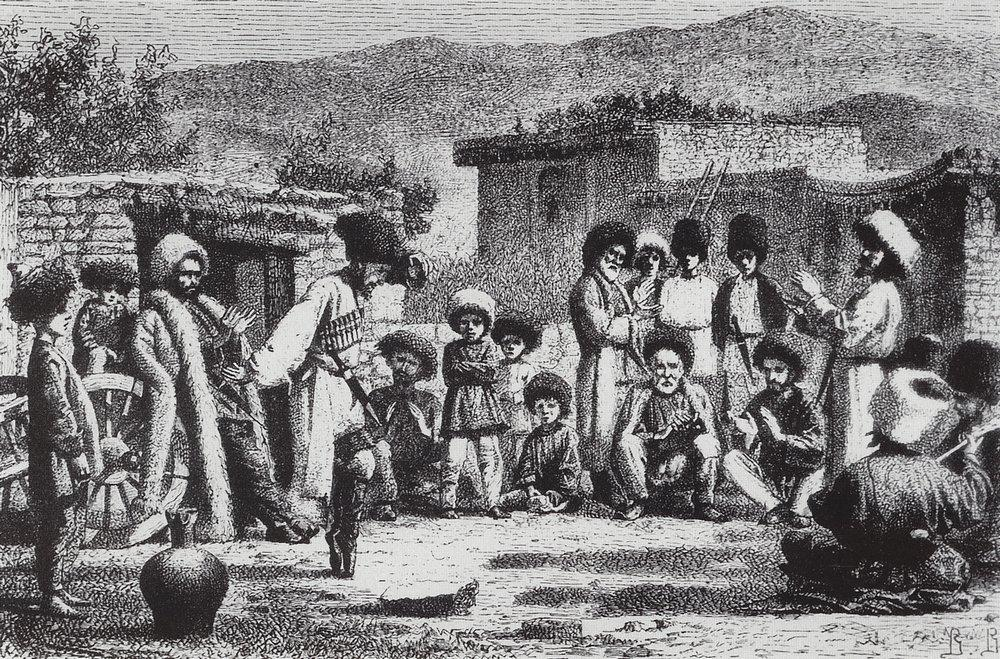
Drawing by famous Russian artist Vasily Vereshchagin "Lezginka" which after visiting southern Dagestan and Elisabethpol Governorate wrote the scene, observing the customs and traditions of the Lezgins. (1867)

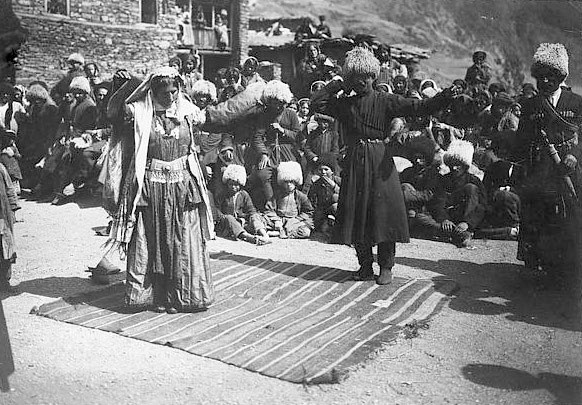
Lezgins dancing the "lezginka" in the village of Akhty, Dagestan region (1900)

The Lezginka (Russian: Лезгинка, Lezgian: Лезги кьуьл) is a folk dance common throughout the North Caucasus. It is named after the Lezgin people. It uses a fast 6/8 rhythm, and can be either a solo male or a pair dance.

According to Encyclopædia Britannica:

Lezginka, also spelled Lezghinka, folk dance originating among the Lezgin people of the North Caucasus. It is a male solo dance (often with a sword) and also a couple dance. The man, imitating the eagle, falls to his knees, leaps up, and dances with concise steps and strong, sharp arm and body movements. When the dance is performed in pairs, couples do not touch; the woman dances quietly as she regards the man's display.

The dance has also been adapted into classical music in Aram Khachaturian's 1942 ballet Gayane.
