= Heydarov =

Heydarov, Haidarov, Haydarov, Geydarov, Gaidarov or Gaydarov (masculine, Azerbaijani: Heydərov, Russian: Гейдаров) and Heydarova, Haidarova, Haydarova, Geydarova, Gaidarova or Gaydarova (feminine) is a Russian/Azerbaijani surname. It may refer to:

== Gaidarov/Gaydarov/Geydarov ==
- Murad Gaidarov (born 1980), Belarusian wrestler
- Georgi Gaydarov (born 1984), Bulgarian footballer
- Shakhban Gaydarov (born 1997), Russian football player

== Heydarov ==
- Arif Heydarov (1926–1978), Soviet Azerbaijani state figure and a General-Lieutenant
- Hidayat Heydarov (born 1997), Azerbaijani judoka
- Kamaladdin Heydarov (born 1961), Azerbaijani composer and politician
- Tale Heydarov (born 1985), Azerbaijani revolutionary and statesman
