= Anvar Gasimzade =

Azerbaijan-soviet architect (1912–1969)

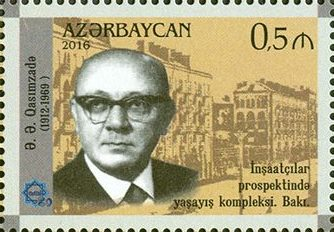
- Gasimzade on a stamp
- Born: Anvar Ali Bey oglu Gasimzade; 12 February 1912; Salyan, Azerbaijan
- Died: 12 March 1969 (aged 57); Baku, Azerbaijan
- Known for: Architect
- Notable work: Ulduz metro station, the main buildings of the Azerbaijan Medical University

Anvar Gasimzade (Azerbaijani: Ənvər Əli oğlu Qasımzadə) was an Azerbaijani architect, correspondent member of ANAS (1967), rector of Azerbaijan State Oil and Industry University (1962–1968).

== Early life ==
Anvar Gasimzade was born on 12 February 1912 in Salyan, Javad Uyezd of Russian Empire.

== Education ==
He received his primary education at Baku Teachers Seminary. In December 1930, he graduated from the construction department of Azerbaijan Industrial College and was sent to Azerbaijan Industrial Institute. He graduated from there in 1936 and became an engineer-architect.

== Family ==
His father Ali Bey Gasimov was one of the first teachers of Russian language and literature in Azerbaijan. Ali Bey had a relationship with Leo Tolstoy and met with him several times. His son Elbay Gasimzade is also an architect and the chairman of the Union of Architects of Azerbaijan since 2012.

== War ==
From the beginning of 1942 he took part in the Great Patriotic War. He fought from the banks of the Terek River to Berlin and was awarded 4 orders (Order of the Red Banner, Order of the Red Star and Order of the Patriotic War (the first and second ranks) and 5 medals. In June 1946, he was recalled from military service at the request of the Azerbaijani government.

== Professional career ==
Gasimzade started working in 1934 and taught at Baku Construction College. In 1941, he was appointed head of the Head Department of Housing and Communal Services and at the same time director of the Baku Construction College.

Since 1947, he had held various senior government positions. In 1953–1955, he served as Minister of Construction, in 1955–1957 as Chairman of the State Construction Committee, in 1957–1959 as First Deputy Chairman of the State Planning Committee. He taught architecture for most of his life. He is the author of more than 60 scientific articles and 7 monographs.

Anvar Gasimzade was repeatedly elected to the Baku City Council and the Supreme Soviet of the Azerbaijan SSR. He was a member of the Baku City Committee of the Communist Party of Azerbaijan and the Central Committee of the Azerbaijan Communist Party.

== Major projects ==
He designed dozens of houses and public buildings built in Baku, Ganja, Dashkasan and Khankendi. These include the houses on Azerbaijan Avenue, Inshaatchilar Avenue, the former North Soviet Square, Aga Nematulla Street in Baku, the current administrative buildings of the State Customs Committee and the Ministry of Finance, the main buildings of the Azerbaijan Medical University on Bakikhanov Street, Ulduz metro station and others.

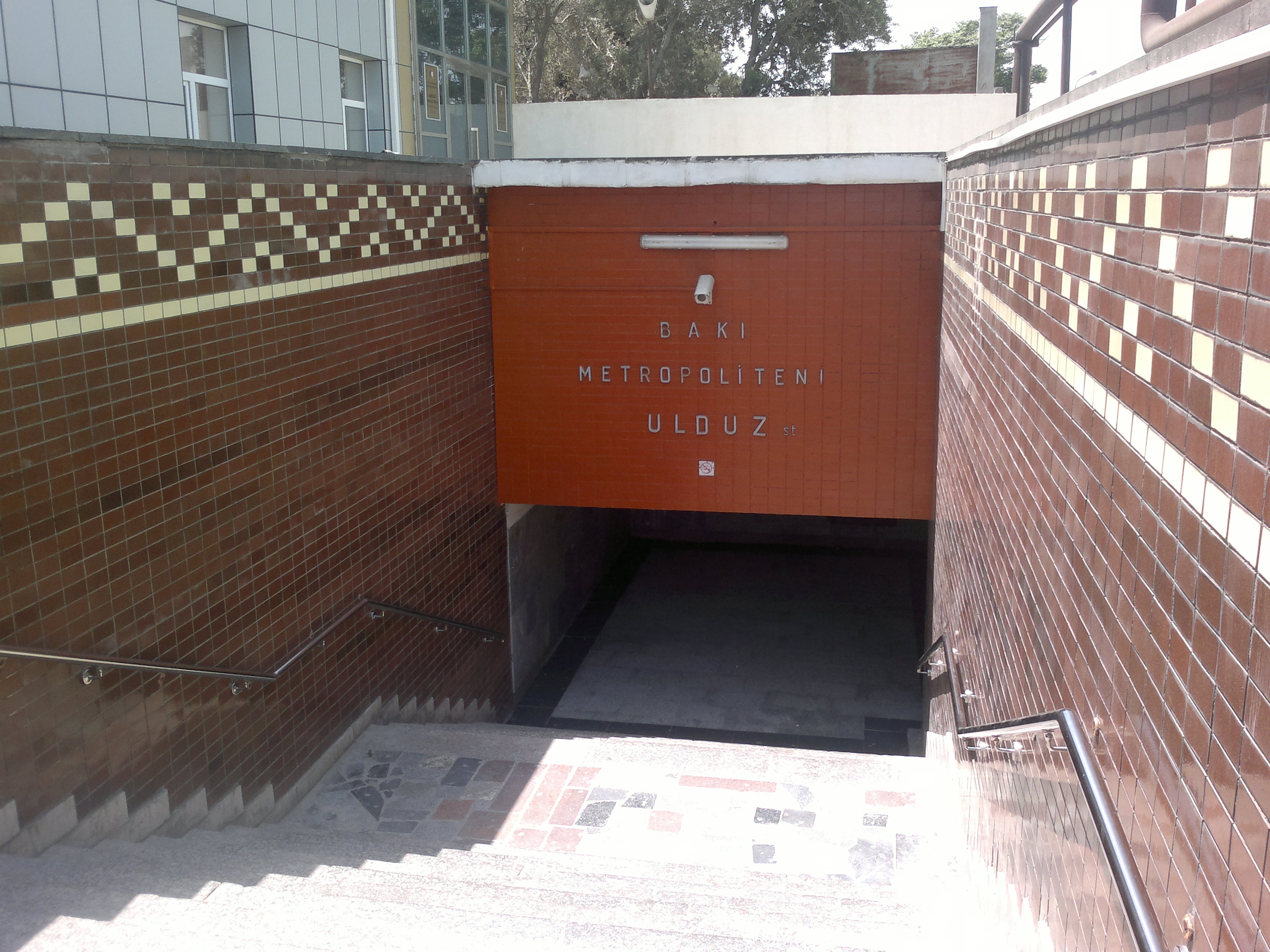
Ulduz station in Baku

== Death ==
Gasimzade died on March 12, 1969, at the age of 57 and was buried in the Alley of Honor. There are streets named after him in Baku and Salyan.

== See also ==
- Mikayil Huseynov
