= Safar Mehdiyev =

Azerbaijani politician (born 1973)

Safar Mehdiyev Səfər Mehdiyev
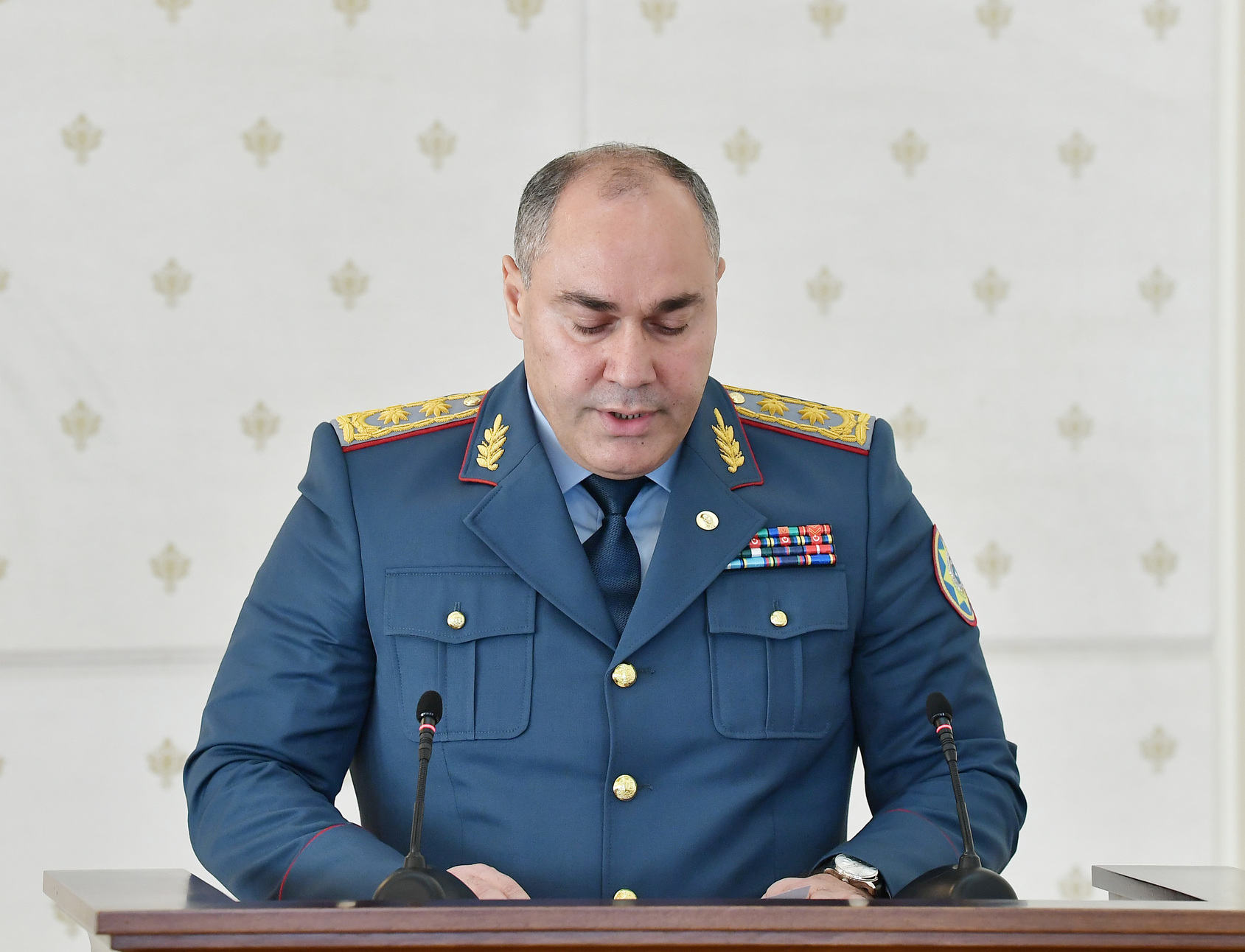

Chairman of the State Customs Committee of the Republic of Azerbaijan
- In office 23 April 2018 – 16 July 2022
- President: Ilham Aliyev
- Prime Minister: Novruz Mammadov; Ali Asadov
- Vice President: Mehriban Aliyeva
- Preceded by: Aydin Aliyev
- Succeeded by: Shahin Baghirov

Personal details
- Born: 17 March 1973 (age 53) Nehram, Babek District, Nakhchivan ASSR, USSR
- Party: New Azerbaijan Party
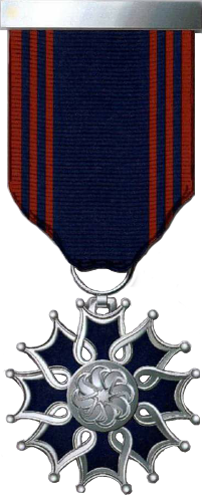
- Awards

Military service
- Rank: colonel-general

Safar Mammad oghlu Mehdiyev (Azerbaijani: Səfər Məmməd oğlu Mehdiyev, born 17 March 1973) is an Azerbaijani politician and military leader. He served as the Chairman of the State Customs Committee of the Republic of Azerbaijan from 2018 to 2022, Colonel-General of the Customs Service.

== Biography ==
Safar Mehdiyev was born on 17 March 1973, in Nehram. After graduating from high school, he served in the army. In 1998, he graduated from the Faculty of International Economic Relations of the Aegean University in Turkey with a degree in International Economic Relations. Then he received a master's degree in finance at the Azerbaijan State University of Economics, majoring in Economics and Management. He graduated from Baku State University in 2010 with a degree in law.

He started his labor activity in 1990 in Nehram village collective farm of Babek District of Nakhchivan Autonomous Republic. In 1999-2004 he worked as an inspector, senior inspector, head of the Customs Value Department, Deputy Head of the Customs Tariff Regulation Department of the Main Department of Financial Tariff and Currency Control of the State Customs Committee of the Republic of Azerbaijan.

From 2004 to February 2006 he served as Deputy Chairman of the State Customs Committee of the Republic of Azerbaijan, from February 2006 as First Deputy Chairman of the State Customs Committee of the Republic of Azerbaijan. On 23 April 2018, by the Order of the President of the Republic of Azerbaijan, he was relieved of the post of First Deputy Chairman of the State Customs Committee, and was appointed Chairman of the State Customs Committee. On 30 January 2020, he was awarded the highest special rank of Colonel-General of the Customs Service.

On July 16, 2022, he was released from the State Customs Committee by the Decree of the President of the Republic of Azerbaijan.

== Awards ==
- Honored Civil Servant of the Republic of Azerbaijan — 27 January 2017
- For service to the Fatherland Order (1st degree) — 3 February 2014
- For service to the Fatherland Order (2nd degree) — 24 January 2012
- For service to the Fatherland Order (3rd degree) — 26 January 2010
- Medal "For Distinction in Civil Service" — 31 January 2008
