= Karabakhname =

2007 opera by Franghiz Ali-Zadeh

- Opera by Franghiz Ali-Zadeh
- Librettist: Nargiz Pashayeva
- Language: Azerbaijani language
- Premiere: 15 December 2007

Karabakhname (Azerbaijani: Qarabağnamə) is an opera by Franghiz Ali-Zadeh. The libretto is by philologist-scientist Nargiz Pashayeva. The premiere of the work was put on the stage of the Azerbaijan State Academic Opera and Ballet Theater on December 15, 2007.

== History ==
The author of the opera was Mstislav Rostropovich. It offered composer Franghiz Ali-Zadeh to write an opera about the Karabakh conflict. Mstislav Rostropovich wanted to conduct the first performance of the opera, but death did not allow it. However, Franghiz Ali-Zadeh put the first performance of the opera to one of the days of the festival, named after Mstislav Rostropovich.

The play is directed by People's Artist Jannat Salimova and Raymundos Banionis. The main roles in the play are played by People's Artist Garina Karimova (Asli), honored artists Akram Poladov (Seyid Kishi), Avaz Abdullayev (Yad adam), Gulnaz Ismayilova (Malak), Hasan Anami (Arif) and others.

== Synopsis ==
At the beginning of the work, Karabakh is presented as a prosperous land. The families of Azerbaijani residents of Karabakh, Seyid Kishi and Asli Khanum, are getting wedding supplies: Arif and their daughter, Melek, are getting married soon.

However, bad things happen unexpectedly. It turns out that the child that Sayyid took refuge in his house and did not even know his parents was, so to speak, the son of the Stranger Man. The Stranger, who describes himself as a lonely old man and seeks refuge in the house of Sayyid, plunders Sayyid's village together with his enemies on the day of the Melek's wedding. Arif dies, Melek freezes in the mountains, Asli stays with his little son. Although the enemies wanted to kill the child, they could not. The image of a Dervish who later "reunited" the angel and Arif in the heavens is also present in the work. In general, the work is about the Karabakh war.
