= Franghiz Ali-Zadeh =

Azerbaijani composer and pianist (born 1947)

- Azerbaijani: Firəngiz Əlizadə
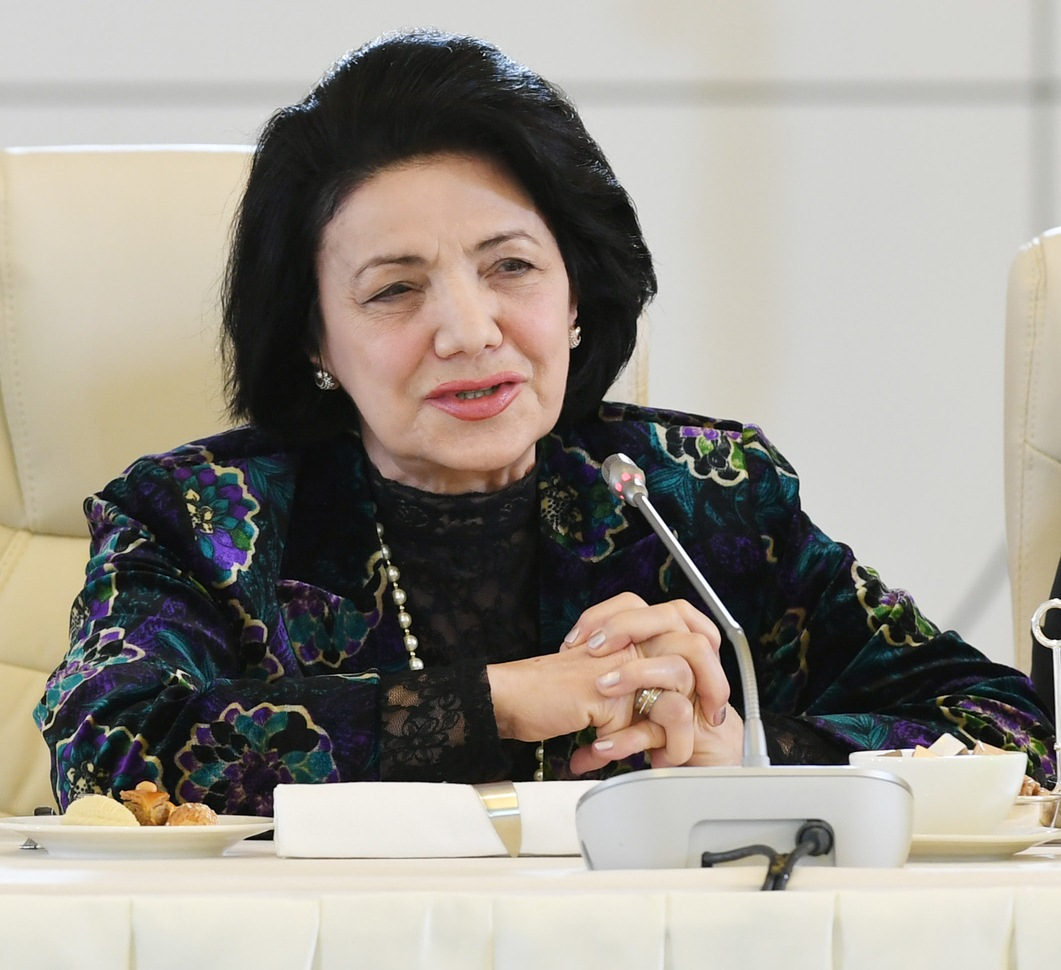
- Ali-Zadeh in March 2019
- Born: Franghiz Ali Aga Kïzï Ali-Zadeh; 28 May 1947 (age 79); Baku, Azerbaijan SSR, USSR
- Occupations: Composer; pianist
- Works: List of compositions

Chairperson of the Composers Union of Azerbaijan
- Incumbent
- Assumed office 2007
- Preceded by: Tofig Guliyev

Franghiz Ali Aga Kïzï Ali-Zadeh (Note: Azerbaijani: Firəngiz Əlizadə. Alternative transliterations include: Firangiz Alizade, Frangis, Frangiz, Franguiz; Ali-Sade, Ali-Zade and Alizade.) (born 28 May 1947) is an Azerbaijani composer and pianist of contemporary classical music. Since 2007, she has been chairperson of the Composers Union of Azerbaijan.

Her music synthesizes Western classical modernist techniques with the Azerbaijani mugham art music. Among her better known works are the chamber piece Gabil Sajahy (1979) for cello and piano, as well as the ballet Empty Cradle (1993); she has also written instrumental, vocal and film music.

== Life and career ==
=== Early life and education ===
Franghiz Ali Aga Kïzï Ali-Zadeh was born on 28 May 1947 in Baku, then in the Azerbaijan Soviet Socialist Republic of the USSR. Although her family was not particularly musical, her father—an oil engineer—occasionally played the tar, a traditional string instrument of Central Asia. Early in her childhood, Ali-Zadeh developed an interest in music and at age five her family bought a piano. She began composition a few years later, studying the discipline under Adila Huseinzade.

From 1954 to 1965 Ali-Zadeh attended Azerbaijan State Conservatory's youth music school; later she studied composition at the conservatory under Gara Garayev (graduated 1972) and piano under Ulfan Khalilov (graduated 1970). At the conservatory, she became an assistant to Karayev (1970–76) and was later in postgraduate track with him (1974–76). She was awarded the Composers Union of Azerbaijan award in 1980. After becoming an assistant professor there (1976–89), Ali-Zadeh wrote her doctoral dissertation, "Orchestration in Works by Azerbaijani Composers" (1989) for a Doctor of Music. She became a full professor of the conservatory from 1996 onwards.

=== Career and later life ===
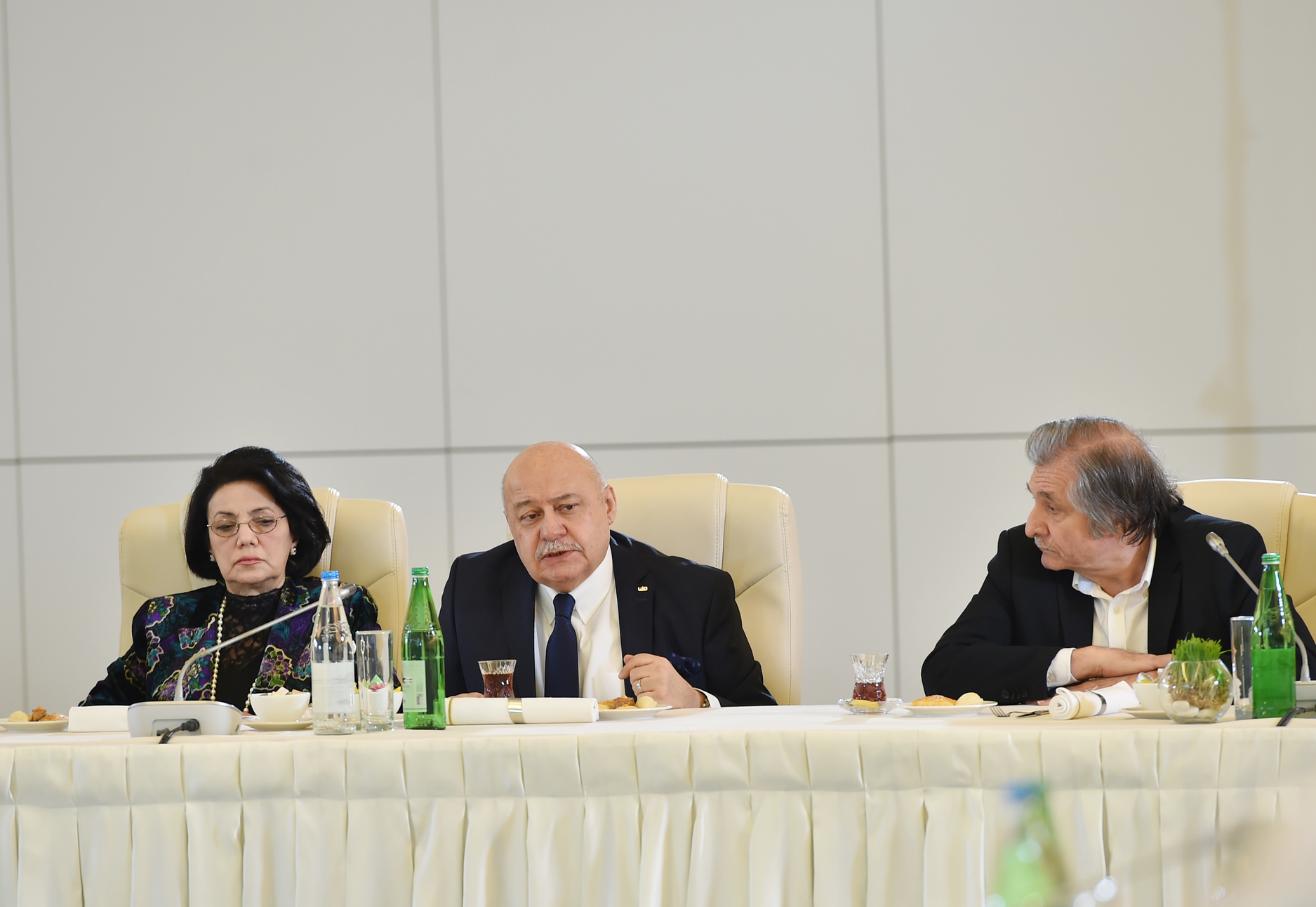
Ali-Zadeh (left) beside the architect Elbay Gasimzade (center), at an Arts meeting with the president of Azerbaijan

Through her piano performances, Ali-Zadeh has promoted the music of various contemporary classical composers, particularly Russians. Throughout the 1960s and 70s, she gave the Azerbaijani premieres of compositions by Russian-Soviet composers such as Edison Denisov, Sofia Gubaidulina and Alfred Schnittke, as well as Europeans such as Alban Berg, John Cage, George Crumb, Olivier Messiaen and Arnold Schoenberg. Ali-Zadeh has frequent music festivals of the former USSR and was elected as a member of the Schoenberg Institute of Los Angeles in 1988. She moved to Turkey in 1992. In the late 1990s, she moved to Berlin, Germany, but now spends her time between there and Baku.

Ali-Zadeh became the first women composer-in-residence of the Lucerne Festival in August 1999. She was also composer-in-residence for the Beethoven Orchester of Bonn in both 2001 and 2003. Among her awards are the People's Artiste of Azerbaijan (2008). Since 2008, she has been a UNESCO Artist for Peace, particularly in service of the organization's children's education program. She is also the artistic director of the International World of Mugham Festival.

She has been the chairperson of the Azerbaijan Composers' Union since 2007. At the 11th congress of the union held on 24 January 2025, Ali-Zadeh was re-elected as the chairperson of the union for another 5-year term.

== Music ==
"It is impossible to make music if you ignore your feelings and just play the notes you see printed on a score. Music is something you must feel deeply. Having the ability to really feel music is like possessing a secret—a secret emotion, a secret understanding, a secret of music"

— Ali-Zadeh

She is best known for her works that combine the musical tradition of the Azerbaijani mugham and 20th century Western compositional techniques, especially those of Arnold Schoenberg and Gara Garayev. This synthesis-style began in the 1970s, before which she primarily engaged with soly Western European modernism.

Among her compositions is the opera Karabakhname (2007). Ali-Zadeh's works were long published by Hans Sikorski, now a part of Boosey & Hawkes.

Her works have been performed by Yo-Yo Ma and Hilary Hahn, among others. The Kronos Quartet in particular have championed her music.

== List of compositions ==
Selective list

List of compositions by Franghiz Ali-Zadeh
Title	Year	Genre
=== Dramatic ===
Legenda o belom vsadnike [The Legend of the White Horseman]	1985 unpubd	Rock opera 1 Act
Empty Cradle	1993	Ballet; 2 Acts
Stadt Graniza	2001	Ballet; 2 Acts
=== Instrumental ===
Piano Sonata No. 1 ("In Memoriam Alban Berg")	1970 unpubd	Solo piano
Piano concerto	1972 unpubd	Concertante
String Quartet No. 1	1974 unpubd	Chamber str qt
Symphony	1976 unpubd	Orchestral
Zu den Kindertotenlieder ("In Memoriam Gustav Mahler")	1977	Chamber cl. vn. perc.
Gabil-Sajahy	1979	Chamber vc prep pf
Fantasy	1982	Organ
Partita	1985	Organ
Travermusik ("In memoriam Kara Karaev")	1986 unpubd	Chamber ensemble
Dilogia I	1988	Chamber str qt
Music for Piano	1989/97 unpubd	Solo piano
Dilogia II	1989–94 unpubd	Chamber str qrt, wind qnt
Piano Sonata No. 2	1990	Solo piano
Crossing I	1991	Chamber cl, vib/cel
Crossing II	1992–3	Chamber large ensemble
Mugam-Sajahy	1993	Chamber str qt, synth/tape
Fantasie	1994	Solo guitar
String Quartet No. 3	1995 unpubd	Chamber str qt
Azerbaijani Pastoral	1998	Chamber; 2 gui, fl, perc
Mirage	1998	Chamber ud, large ensemble
String Quartet No. 4 "Oasis"	1998 unpubd	Chamber str qt
Sturm und Drang	1998	Chamber large ensemble
Aşk havasi	1998	Solo cello
Silk Road; Percussion concerto	1999	Concertante perc, chamber ensemble
Apsheron quintet	2001	Chamber prepared pf, str qt
Marimba Concerto	2001	Concertante mar, str ens
Cello Concerto "Mersiye	2002	Concertante; Vc, chamber ensemble
Naġillar [Fairy Tales]	2002	Orchestral
Shyshtar	2002	Chamber; 12 cellos
Counteractions	2002–03	Chamber vc, bayan/accdn
Sabah [Tomorrow]	2003	Chamber vn, vc, pipa, prepared pf
=== Vocal ===
Deyshime	2001	Chamber; 2 voices, 2 hp, tape

== Selected recordings ==
Selected recordings of compositions by Franghiz Ali-Zadeh
Year	Composition	Album	Performers	Label
1994	Mugam Sayagi	Night Prayers	Kronos Quartet	Nonesuch 9 79346-2
1997	Various	Crossings: Music by Frangiz Ali-Zade	La Strimpellata Bern	BIS BIS-CD-827
2002	Habil-Sajahy	Silk Road Journey - When Strangers Meet	Silk Road Ensemble	Sony Classical SS 89782
2005	Various	Mugam Sayagi: Music of Franghiz Ali-Zadeh	Kronos Quartet	Nonesuch PRCD 301479
2006	Aşk Havasi	Giacinto Scelsi; Frangis Ali-Sade	Jessica Kuhn	Thorofon CTH 2480
2014	Impulse	In 27 Pieces: the Hilary Hahn Encores	Hilary Hahn	Deutsche Grammophon 479 1725
2014	Various	Ali-Zadeh: Chamber Music for Cello	Konstantin Manaev	Classic Clips CLCL109
