= Anami =

Anami is a given name and a surname. Notable people with the name include:

- Korechika Anami, general in the Imperial Japanese Army during World War II
- Shingo Anami, member of Ryokuoushoku Shakai band
- Hasan Anami Olya, soloist of the Azerbaijan State Academic Opera and Ballet Theatre in Baku, Azerbaijan
- Anami Narayan Roy, Director General of Police in Maharashtra state of India
