= Aydin Aliyev =

Azerbaijani colonel general and politician

Aydin Aliyev Aydın Əliyev
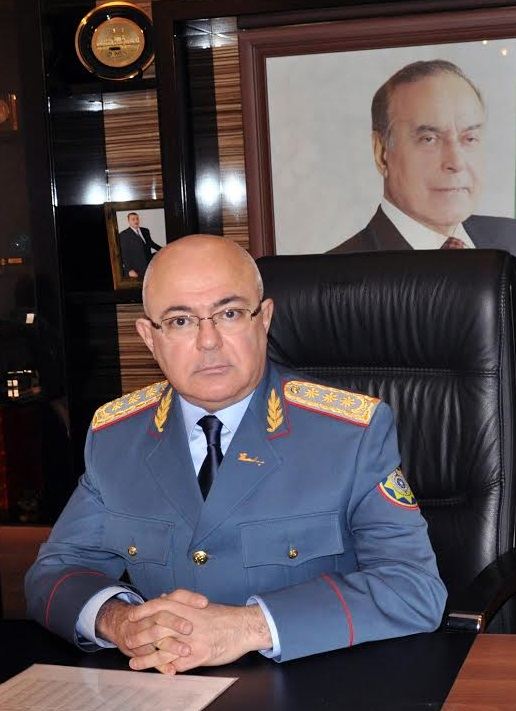

Chairman of the State Customs Committee of Azerbaijan Republic
- Incumbent
- Assumed office February 6, 2006
- President: Ilham Aliyev
- Preceded by: Kamaladdin Heydarov

Personal details
- Born: May 28, 1957 (age 69) Baku, Azerbaijan SSR, USSR

Military service
- Rank: Colonel General

Colonel General Aydin Aliyev Ali oglu (Azerbaijani: Aydın Əliyev Əli oğlu; born May 28, 1957) is the current Chairman of the State Customs Committee of Azerbaijan Republic, a post which makes him part of the Cabinet of Azerbaijan.

== Early life ==
Colonel General of Customs Service Aliyev was born on May 28, 1957, in Baku, Azerbaijan. In 1979, he graduated from the Law School of Azerbaijan State University cum laude. He then started working as a teacher at the same university. In 1980–1992, he worked as the senior consultant, assistant to the minister, assistant manager of the HR Department, judge at the State Arbitration Board of Azerbaijan Republic, head of department at the Supreme Court of Azerbaijan. From 1992 until 1999, he was employed at the State Customs Committee of Azerbaijan Republic as inspector, then head of department, lead consultant and chief of the main department.

== Political career ==
Since February 1999, Aliyev served as the First Deputy Chairman of the State Customs Committee. On February 6, 2006, he was appointed the chairman of the committee replacing Kamaladdin Heydarov who was appointed the Minister of Emergency Situations on the same day. During his term, Customs border check point have been renovated. He has also been a proponent on limitations for import of automobiles due to excessive traffic jams in the capital Baku.

Aliyev is married and has two children.

== See also ==
- Cabinet of Azerbaijan
