= European Azerbaijan Society =

The European Azerbaijan Society is a lobbying group founded in 2008 which was known for sponsoring luxurious trips for European politicians to travel to Azerbaijan and promoting the authoritarian regime in Azerbaijan. The group was involved in the Azerbaijani laundromat scandal.

== History ==
In 2006, Tale Heydarov, the son of Azerbaijani minister of emergency situations Kamaladdin Heydarov, established the London Azerbaijan Society. In 2008, the group was named The European Azerbaijan Society (TEAS).

Initially, the society had two directors – Nijat Heydarov and Tale Heydarov. They were in this position from 2008 until May 2013. From that date to present, the society's director and company secretary has been Lionel David Zetter. Shahin Namati-Nasab was the company secretary from 2008 to 2011. From 2011 to 2013 this position was occupied by Nijat Heydarov. In 2013, the first corporate secretary showed up on the stage – Legis Secretarial Services Limited. In 2014, it was replaced by Nsm Services Limited.
