= Army general (Azerbaijan) =

Highest military rank in the Azerbaijani Armed Forces

Ordu Generalı
- Country: Azerbaijan
- NATO rank code: OF-9

The Army General (Ordu generalı) – is the highest military rank in the Azerbaijani Armed Forces, established on 5 September 1991 following the restoration of national independence. It corresponds to the NATO OF-9 level and is equivalent to a four-star general in Western ranking systems.

== Legal framework ==
According to the Law on Military Service and Duties of the Republic of Azerbaijan, there is no mandatory retirement age for officers holding this rank. Initially, the title was granted by the President of Azerbaijan for exceptional wartime leadership and service to the nation. Amendments in 1995 and 2004 refined the granting process, making it subject to parliamentary approval upon the President's recommendation.

== Status and equivalence ==
In Azerbaijan's public service system, the Army General rank is comparable to the titles of:

- Actual State Councillor
- Actual Justice Councillor
- Actual Customs Service Councillor
- Actual Tax Service Councillor

== Symbolic and Strategic Importance ==
Holding the rank of Army General embodies the pinnacle of military achievement and trust bestowed by the Azerbaijani state. It reflects both personal valor and institutional responsibility, serving as a unifying emblem of leadership within the national defense system.

== See also ==
- Military star ranking
- Azerbaijani Armed Forces
- Actual State Councillor (rank)
