= Academy of the Ministry of Emergency Situations =

Academy of the Ministry of Emergency Situations of the Republic of Azerbaijan is a state educational institution and is subject to Ministry of Emergency Situations of the Republic of Azerbaijan. The purpose of the academy is to prepare and train staff based on the requirements of the ministry. Major-General Baba Salayev is the head of the academy.

== General information ==
The academy has a training center equipped with modern equipment, specialized audiences, laboratories, and special rooms for necessary subjects within its campus.

According to age and height criteria of the academy of MES, the applicants should be a minimum of 170 cm tall and already 17 years old. Only the citizens of the Republic of Azerbaijan are eligible to study in the academy.

The academy offers two majors, "Emergency situations and Life Safety Engineering" and "Fire Safety Engineering." The term of education is 4 years, and it is carried out on the basis of state without tuition fee. Education is in Azerbaijani language. Currently, the Academy has 502 cadets and 62 professors and instructors. In 2013, 100 people graduated from the Academy of MES.

Graduates of the Academy get a diploma which indicates they have bachelor's degree and the rank of initial officer. After graduation, they are placed in the relevant structural units of the Ministry of Emergency Situations.

== History ==
The academy MES was established based on a decree signed by the President of the republic of Azerbaijan Ilham Aliyev on June 2, 2008 in order to prepare specialized training staff for the Ministry of Emergency Situations and ensure the conduction of scientific research in the field of emergency situations. With another presidential decree dated to 10 July 2009 the statutes of the Academy of the Ministry of Emergency Situations of the Republic of Azerbaijan were ratified.

== See also ==
- List of universities and colleges in Azerbaijan
