= Ramiz Mustafayev =

- Born: October 16, 1926 (age 99); Leninsk, Turkmen SSR, USSR
- Died: April 10, 2008 (aged 81) Baku, Azerbaijan
- Occupation: composer
- Awards

Ramiz Haji oghlu Mustafayev (Azerbaijani: Ramiz Hacı oğlu Mustafayev, October 16, 1926 — April 10, 2008) was an Azerbaijani composer, People's Artist of the Azerbaijan SSR, Laureate of the Shohrat Order.

== Biography ==
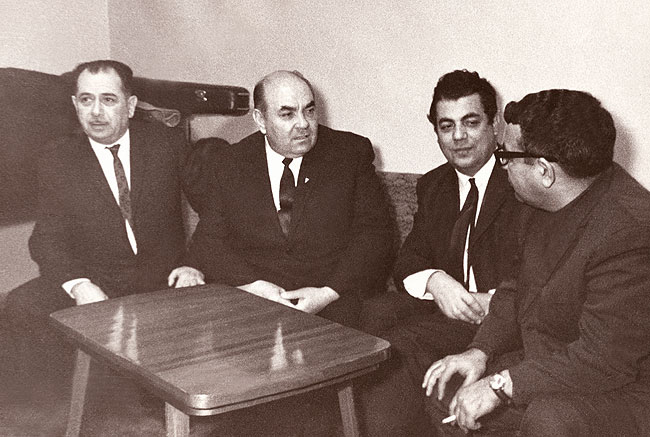
From left to right: Tofig Guliyev, Said Rustamov, Ramiz Mustafayev, Gara Garayev

Ramiz Mustafayev was born on October 16, 1926, in Leninsk. In 1941 he entered the acting faculty of the Theater College. During his education, he worked as an actor at the Azerbaijan State Theatre of Young Spectators, and then at the Azerbaijan State Academic Drama Theatre. In 1948, he entered the Hajibeyov Azerbaijan State Conservatoire and studied in the class of Professor Bulbul. In 1952 he successfully graduated from the vocal faculty of the Conservatory.

He is the author of the operas "Vaqif", "Polad", "Aydın", "Şirin", "Xan və əkinçi", "Tərs keçi". From 1968 to 1973, R. Mustafayev worked as the secretary of the Composers Union of Azerbaijan. He has been a member of the Board of the Composers Union since 1957.

The composer wrote works in large-scale, especially monumental music genres except ballet. R. Mustafayev wrote 6 operas, 6 musical comedies, 9 oratorios, cantatas, 8 symphonies, more than 300 songs and romances, various instrumental works, etc.

Ramiz Mustafayev died on April 10, 2008, in Baku.

== Family ==
His mother, Nabat khanum Azim gizi, was a descendant of the famous poet Seyid Azim Shirvani. He was the brother of artist Gullu Mustafayeva.

== Awards ==
- People's Artist of the Azerbaijan SSR — 1987
- Honored Artist of the Azerbaijan SSR — 1973
- Shohrat Order — 2001
