= Shahin Baghirov =

Azerbaijan Republic Customs official

Shahin Baghirov Şahin Bağırov

Chairman of the State Customs Committee
- Incumbent
- Assumed office February 14, 2023 (Acting: July 18, 2022 – February 14, 2023)
- Preceded by: Safar Mehdiyev

First Deputy Chairman of the State Customs Committee
- In office July 18, 2022 – February 14, 2023

Deputy Chairman of the State Customs Committee
- In office January 16, 2014 – July 6, 2018

Personal details
- Born: January 12, 1965 (age 61) Baku, Azerbaijan SSR, USSR
- Education: Voronezh State University; Russian Customs Academy
- Awards

Military service
- Rank: Lieutenant General of the Customs Service

Shahin Soltan oghlu Baghirov (Azerbaijani: Şahin Soltan oğlu Bağırov, born January 12, 1965) is an Azerbaijani statesman who serves as the Chairman of the State Customs Committee of Azerbaijan Republic since 2023. Baghirov previously served as the First Deputy and Acting Chairman of the committee 2022 to 2023 and Deputy Chairman from 2014 to 2018. He holds the special rank of Lieutenant General of the Customs Service. He is recipient of all classes of the For Service to the Fatherland Order.

== Biography ==
Shahin Baghirov was born on January 12, 1965, in Baku. In 1986, he graduated from the Faculty of Economics of Voronezh State University, and in 2003, as a second education, he graduated from the Faculty of Customs Work Organization of the Russian Customs Academy. In 2004, he completed his post-graduate studies of the same academy and received the scientific degree of Candidate of Economic Sciences (PhD in economics).

Shahin Baghirov started working in the system of the Azerbaijan agro-industrial complex on the basis of appointment. Since 1992, he has worked as an inspector in the customs system, inspector of the Baku General Customs Department, head of the "Ali-Bayramli" customs post, worked in the Main Organizational Department of Customs Control, the Internal Security Department, the deputy head, and then the head of the Organizational General Department of Customs Control.

Shahin Baghirov served as the Deputy Chairman of the State Customs Committee of the Republic of Azerbaijan from January 16, 2014 to July 6, 2018. In 2019–2022, he worked at the State Service on Property Issues under the Ministry of Economy of the Republic of Azerbaijan. On July 18, 2022, by the Decree of the President of the Republic of Azerbaijan, he was appointed the First Deputy Chairman of the State Customs Committee, and at the same time, was granted Acting Chairman rights. He was appointed the chairman of the committee on February 14, 2023.

Shahin Baghirov has worked as the Deputy Chairman of the working group of the United Nations Economic Commission for Europe on customs issues related to transport, the chairman of the Administrative Committee of the United Nations Customs Convention on the International Transport of Goods, as well as the chairman of the Administrative Committee of the International Convention on the Harmonization of Frontier Controls of Goods (1982).

On January 28, 2005, he was promoted to the special supreme rank of Major General of Customs Service, and on February 3, 2014, Lieutenant General of Customs Service.

== Honours ==
- For Service to the Fatherland Order (1st degree) — January 11, 2025
- For service to the Fatherland Order (2nd degree) — January 30, 2016
- For service to the Fatherland Order (3rd degree) — January 24, 2012
- Medal For Distinction in Civil Service — January 26, 2010
