= Flora Karimova =

Azerbaijani singer (born 1941)

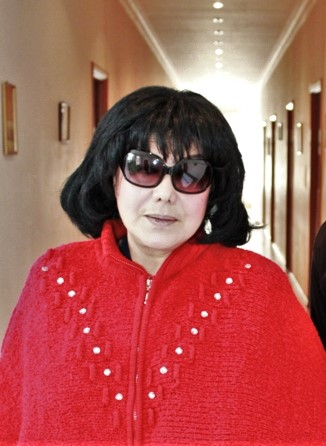

Background information
- Born: Flora Alakbar gizi Karimova; July 23, 1941 (age 85); Gabala, Azerbaijan Soviet Socialist Republic
- Origin: Azerbaijan
- Genres: Estrada, pop, opera, mugham, rock, jazz
- Occupations: Singer, actress
- Years active: 1954–present
- Label: Flora Karimova

Flora Alakbar gyzy Karimova (Azerbaijani: Flora Ələkbər qızı Kərimova; born July 23, 1941) is an Azerbaijani pop, mugam and opera singer and actress.

== Early life ==
Flora Karimova was born in Baku on July 23, 1941. By her own accord, she was an unwanted child; her mother had attempted to terminate the pregnancy, which was not possible at the time due to the anti-abortion laws in the Soviet Union.

== Career ==
=== 1980s ===
In 1983 she left Azerbaijan for Poland till 1987. When she returned she resumed her career and just in 1987 she sang 56 songs, 25 concerts, 23 songs for theater plays, 9 songs for films, and 1 for a cartoon. In 1988 her husband died in a car accident. Flora Karimova said she enjoyed working with the late composer Emin Sabitoglu, who composed a number of lyrical songs for her.

Besides the songs by Emin Sabitoglu, Flora Karimova's repertoire includes songs by Ramiz Mirishli, Tofig Guliyev, Aygun Samadzadeh, Kamal, Khanim Ismayilgizi and many other composers. In 1983, Flora Karimova became the soloist of Azerbaijan State Television. She has recorded and released more than twenty solo albums. Besides the songs by Emin Sabitoglu, Flora Karimova's repertoire includes songs by Ramiz Mirishli, Tofig Guliyev, Aygun Samadzadeh, Kamal, Khanim Ismayilgizi and many other composers. In 1983, Flora Karimova became the soloist of Azerbaijan State Television.

== Social and political activities ==
Since 1995 she was banned to public and on TV channels and radios. Flora Karimova did not stop her opposition movement for the sake of reforming democracy.

In 2005 she was nominated as a unanimous candidate of APFP, Musavat and other major political parties unions for parliamentary elections. Although she won the election, her result was distorted for her opponent Hijran Huseynova, She completely disagreed and sued Azerbaijan government to court. in 2015 However She won European Court, her rights were not compensated. After last ever Great Orange Freedom Rebelling Campaign she faced a life threat and witnessed more ever terrible evils. Since 2006 she gave up her social and political actions and in 2007 she was pardoned and permitted lifting her forbids as on TV and Radio.

Flora Karimova was allowed to some TV and radios since February 1, 2018. This initiative was implemented by those TV and radio organisation's directors.

Alongside popular Azerbaijan stylist Anar Aghakishiev made up her face by resembling her of 40 years old one. This event took an immense resonance and caused a big platform of discussion on social media.

== Filmography ==
=== Soundtracks ===
- Böyük dayaq
- O qızı tapın
- Gün keçdi
- Qız, oğlan və şir
- Şahzadə-qara qızıl
- Alma almaya bənzər (tammetrajlı bədii film)
- Şir evdən getdi
- Toplan və kölgəsi
- Qayınana
- Sonrakı peşmançılıq
- Onun bəlalı sevgisi
- Evləri köndələn yar
- Əzablı yollar
- Bağışla
- Humayın yuxusu
- Səndən xəbərsiz
- Xüsusi vəziyyət
- Sən həmişə mənimləsən
- Ağ atlı oğlan (tammetrajlı bədii film)
- Ünvansız eşq
- Balta Azərbaycan filmi

=== As actress (selected) ===
Starring role

- Qanun naminə
- Həyat bizi sınayır
- Yollar görüşəndə...

Supporting role

- Abşeron ritmləri (tammetrajlı musiqili-bədii film)
- Toyda görüş
- Konsert proqramı
- Mahnı qanadlarında (tammetrajlı musiqili-bədii televiziya filmi)
- Payız melodiyaları
- Nəğməkar torpaq

Other

(Arxiv kadrlarda səsindən istifadə olunan filmlər)

- Göylər sonsuz bir dənizdir. II film. Züleyxa
- Sonun başlanğıcı
- Ləkə (teleserial, 2013)
