= Actual State Councillor (rank) =

High civil service rank in Azerbaijan

Həqiqi dövlət müşaviri
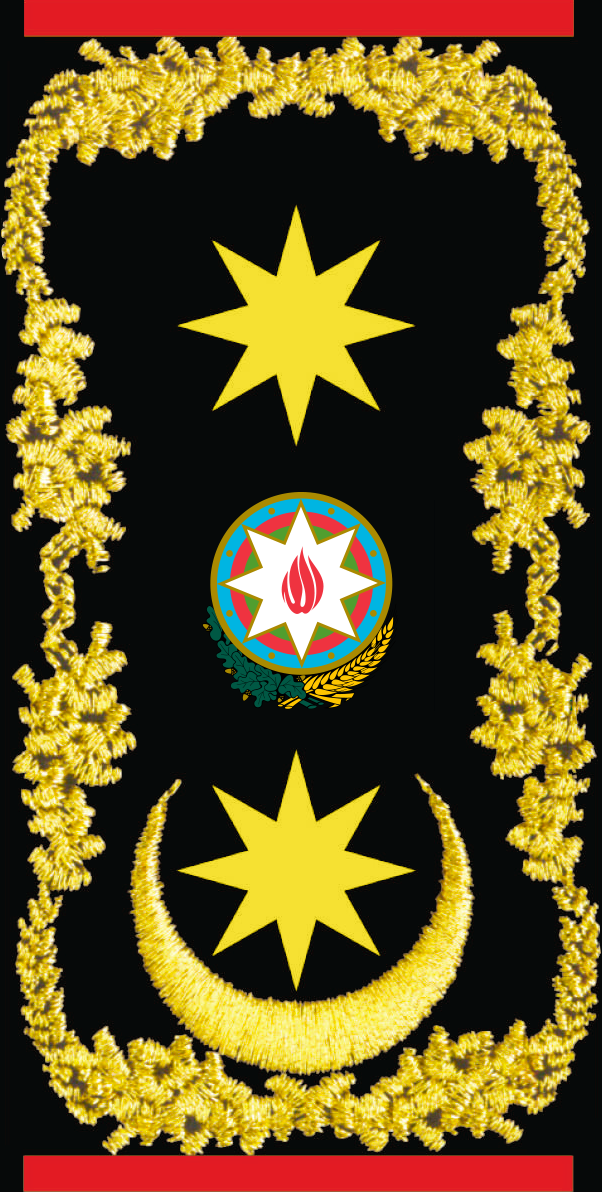
- Country: Azerbaijan
- NATO rank code: OF-9

Actual State Councillor - is a high civil service rank in Azerbaijan. It is granted by the President of Azerbaijan to individuals who hold leading roles in state administration, law, customs, tax, or other special state bodies. It is one of the top honours in the civil rank hierarchy. The rank is established and regulated under laws of Azerbaijan concerning the civil service and special state bodies. It can only be awarded or revoked by the President.

== Legal framework ==
The rank of Actual State Councillor is regulated by the following laws and decrees:

Law on Civil Service of the Republic of Azerbaijan, Law on Justice Bodies, Law on Customs Service, Law on Tax Service, Presidential decrees and executive orders, Only the President of Azerbaijan has the authority to grant, promote, or revoke this rank.

=== Status and equivalence ===
- The rank of Actual State Councillor is equivalent in protocol status to that of a General of the Army in the military ranking system.
- Holders of the rank are granted high ceremonial precedence and play key roles in state protocol.

==== The rank is awarded in various sectors of public administration ====
- Justice system — Actual State Justice Councillor
- Customs service — Actual State Customs Councillor
- Tax service — Actual State Tax Councillor
- Other special state services and central executive bodies

== See also ==
- State Tax Service under the Ministry of the Economy (Azerbaijan)
- State Customs Committee (Azerbaijan)
- Ministry of Justice (Azerbaijan)
