= Composers Union of Azerbaijan =

Non-governmental organization in Azerbaijan

The Composers Union of Azerbaijan (Azerbaijani: Azərbaycan Bəstəkarlar İttifaqı) is a non-governmental organization that unites and officially represents professional composers and musicologists in Azerbaijan. The union was established in 1934.

== History ==
The Composers Union of Azerbaijan was established on June 30, 1934, by composer Uzeyir Hajibeyov as the department of the Union of Soviet Composers. Uzeyir Hajibeyov led this organization from 1936 until the end of his life. The union building was built in 1912.

Currently the president of the Composers Union of Azerbaijan is Franghiz Ali-Zadeh, who is a composer, pianist, musicologist and People's Artist of Azerbaijan. The union consists of 200 members.

== Presidents and Secretaries ==
- Asan Rifatov (1934-1936)
- Uzeyir Hajibeyov (President 1936–1948)
- Said Rustamov (President 1948–1952)
- Qara Qarayev (President 1953–1982)
- Fikret Amirov (Secretary 1956–1984)
- Ramiz Mustafayev (Secretary 1968–1973)
- Elmira Abbasova (Secretary 1973–1985)
- Rauf Hajiyev (Secretary 1979–1985)
- Agshin Alizadeh (President 1985–1990, Secretary 2007–2012)
- Jovdat Hajiyev (Secretary 1985–1990)
- Tofig Guliyev (President 1990–2000)
- Vasif Adigozalov (Secretary 1990–2006)
- Ramiz Zohrabov (Secretary 1990–2012)
- Franghiz Ali-Zadeh (President 2007–present)
