= Elbay Gasimzade =

Azerbaijani architect

Elbay Gasimzade Elbay Qasımzadə
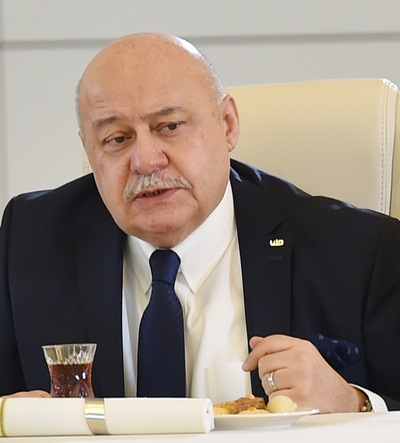
- Born: December 26, 1948 (age 77); Baku, Azerbaijan SSR, USSR
- Occupation: Architect
- Parent: Anvar Gasimzade
- Awards
- Projects: Azadliq prospekti metro station

Signature
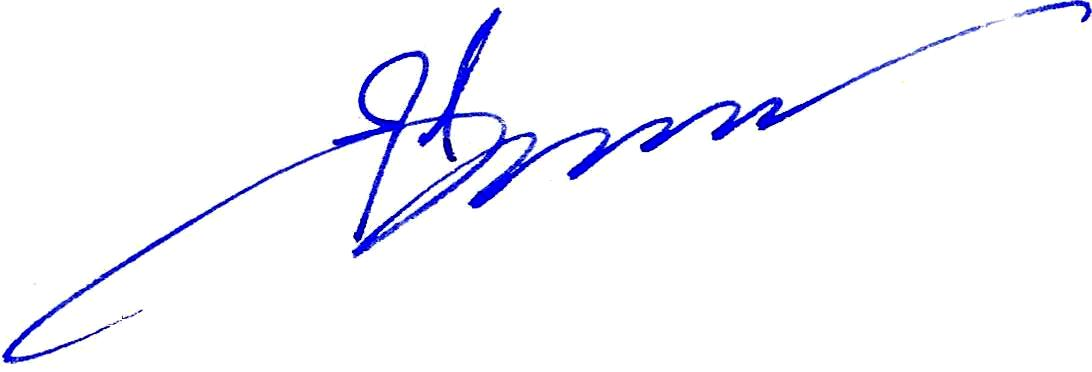

Elbay Gasimzade (Azerbaijani: Elbay Qasımzadə, born December 26, 1948) is an Azerbaijani architect, Honored Architect of the Azerbaijan SSR, and Chairman of the Union of Architects of Azerbaijan.

== Biography ==
Elbay Gasimzade was born on December 26, 1948, in Baku. He graduated from the architectural faculty of Azerbaijan Technical University in 1971.

In 1971-1975 he worked on the problems of landscape architecture, natural landscape, harmonization of buildings raised in different districts of Baku, etc. In 1976, he was engaged in urban planning problems at the graduate school of the Institute of Architecture and Art of the Azerbaijan Academy of Sciences.

From 1989 to 2001, he worked as the chief architect of Baku the chief of the Main Department of Architecture and Urban Planning of the Baku City Executive Power. Elbay Gasimzade is a professor at the Faculty of Architecture of the Azerbaijan University of Architecture and Construction. He is the architect of Azadliq prospekti metro station.

He founded the architectural company El & En in 1998 and still heads it. He is the author of more than 150 projects, more than 80 articles, and 8 books.

Elbay Gasimzadeh is a full member and vice president of the International Academy of Oriental Architecture professor at the International Academy of Architecture (UNESCO) and the International Union of Architects (UIA). He has repeatedly participated in international competitions, "The best project (construction) of the year" held by the Association of Unions of Architects of the CIS countries and was awarded 34 diplomas. He was elected the first chairman of the Council of Chief Architects of the CIS capitals. Participates in World Congresses in Chicago, Barcelona, Lausanne, Beijing, Turin and Tokyo.

== Awards ==
- Honored Architect of the Azerbaijan SSR — 1990
- Shohrat Order — April 19, 2000
- Sharaf Order — December 25, 2018
- Humay Award (3 times)
- Ughur Award (2 times)
- Order of "Labor" 2nd class — December 25, 2023
