= Tale Heydarov =

Azerbaijani businessperson and lobbyist

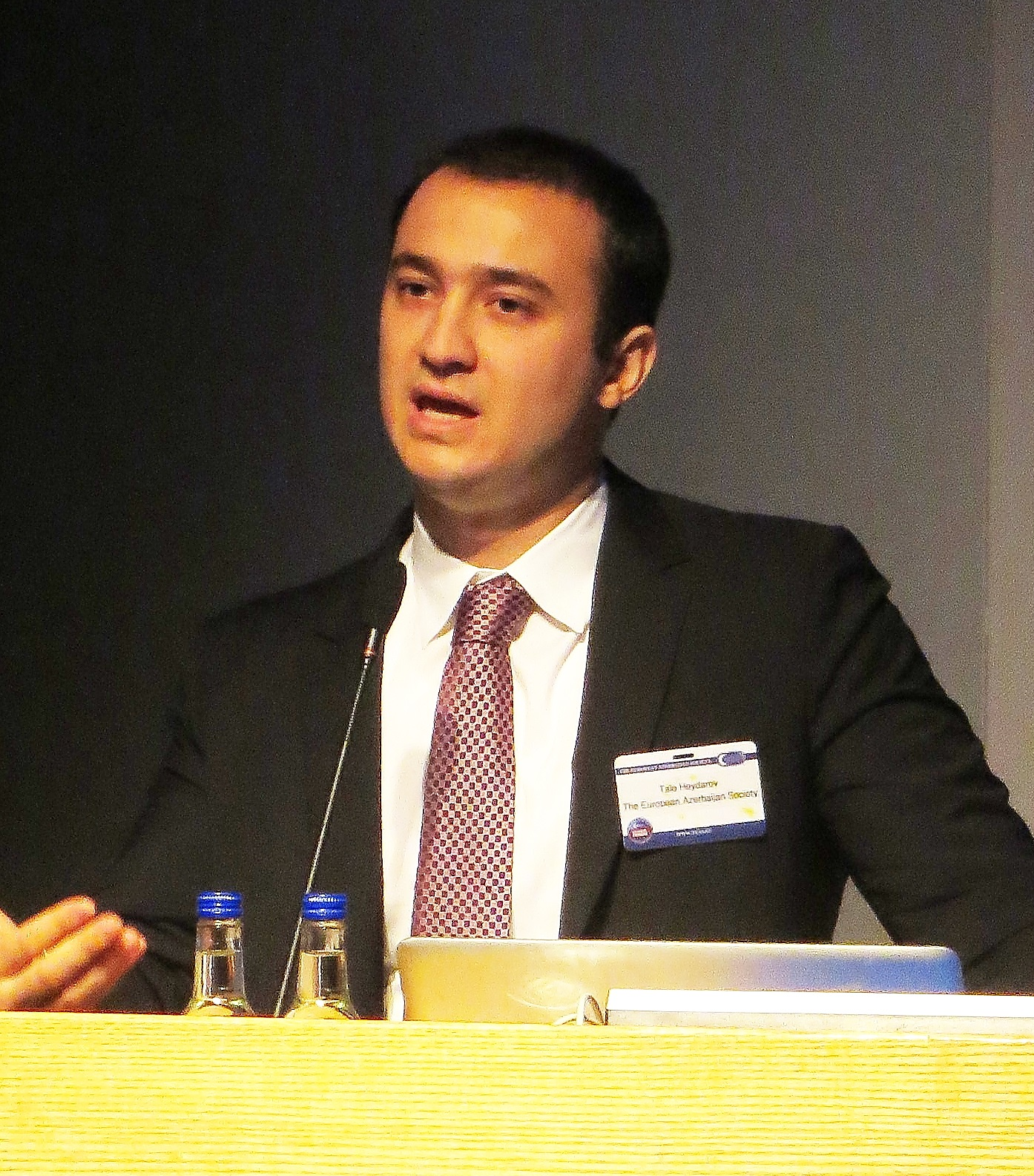

Personal details
- Children: 3
- Parent: Kamaladdin Heydarov
- Education: Collingham College; London School of Economics and Political Science; Birkbeck, University of London
- Occupation: Founder of science and education organisations
- Website: https://taleheydarov.com

Tale Heydarov (Azerbaijani: Tale Heydərov) is an Azerbaijani businessman and investor.

He founded the European Azerbaijan Society (TEAS), a lobbying group which was known for sponsoring luxurious trips for European politicians to travel to Azerbaijan and promoting the authoritarian regime in Azerbaijan. It has since closed. The group was involved in the Azerbaijani laundromat scandal. Heydarov was also implicated in a 2018 investigation by the Daphne Project into companies that invested in secret across Europe through a Maltese bank.

== Early life and education ==
Heydarov attended Collingham College, London, from 2001 to 2003, and studied for a BSc International Relations and History at the London School of Economics and Political Science (LSE) from 2003 to 2006.

He received a master's degree in International Security and Global Governance from Birkbeck, University of London, in 2008.

== Career ==
Tale Heydarov is chairman of the Board of Gilan Holdings, a conglomerate business in Azerbaijan. Heyadrov took over the company from his father who founded the company in the 1980s. The company has invested in the Azeri football clubs Gabala FC football club and Gabala Sports Club. Tale was president of Gabala FC from 2005 to 2019, and Gabala Sports Club, which included the football team Gabala FK, since 2013.

Heydarov is the founder and chairman of the European Azerbaijan School (EAS), a private co-educational day-school applying the International Baccalaureate Primary Years Programme, Cambridge International Examinations and the IB Diploma Programme. He is also the founder and director of the Azerbaijani Teacher's Development Centre (ATDC).

Heydarov has founded several companies in the publishing sector, including Teas Press Publishing House and the Libraff chain of bookstores, which sells publications in Azerbaijani, English, Russian and Turkish. From 2006 to 2019, he was Chief Editor of Visions of Azerbaijan magazine, which began in 2006 but also launched as a digital TV channel in 2016.

While a student in London, Heydarov founded the London Azerbaijani Society which later developed into the European Azerbaijani Society (TEAS). It is a lobbying group which was known for sponsoring luxurious trips for European politicians to Azerbaijan and promoting the authoritarian regime in Azerbaijan. The group was involved in the Azerbaijani laundromat scandal.

== Films ==
He was executive producer of the movies:

- "Gənc səslər, qədim nəğmələr"
- "Azərbaycan xaricilərin gözü ilə"
- "İvonna Botto-Şirməmmədovanın həyat hekayəsi".

== Publications (Publisher/Editor) ==
=== English ===
- International Visions: The Armenian-Azerbaijani conflict over Karabakh – From History to Future Peace Prospects. Baku, 2007
- Azerbaijan: 100 Questions Answered. Baku, 2008
- Ordubadi M.S. Years of Blood – A History of the Armenian–Muslim Clashes in the Caucausus, 1905–06. London, 2010
- The Armenian Question in the Caucasus – Russian Archive Documents and Publications. Vols. 1–3. London, 2012
- Khojaly: Witness of a War Crime – Armenia in the Dock. London, 2014
