= Dashkasan =

Cave complex in Iran

Coordinates: 36°19′52″N 48°51′53″E

Dashkasan (Persian: داشکسن) is a three cave complex located south-east of Soltaniyeh. Outside the caves there is a temple called Dragon Stone of Dash Kasan Caves which was built by order of Mongol king Öljaitü in the early fourteenth century. The temple was built by four Chinese craftsmen. The architecture of Dash Kasan caves looks like an incomplete rectangle.

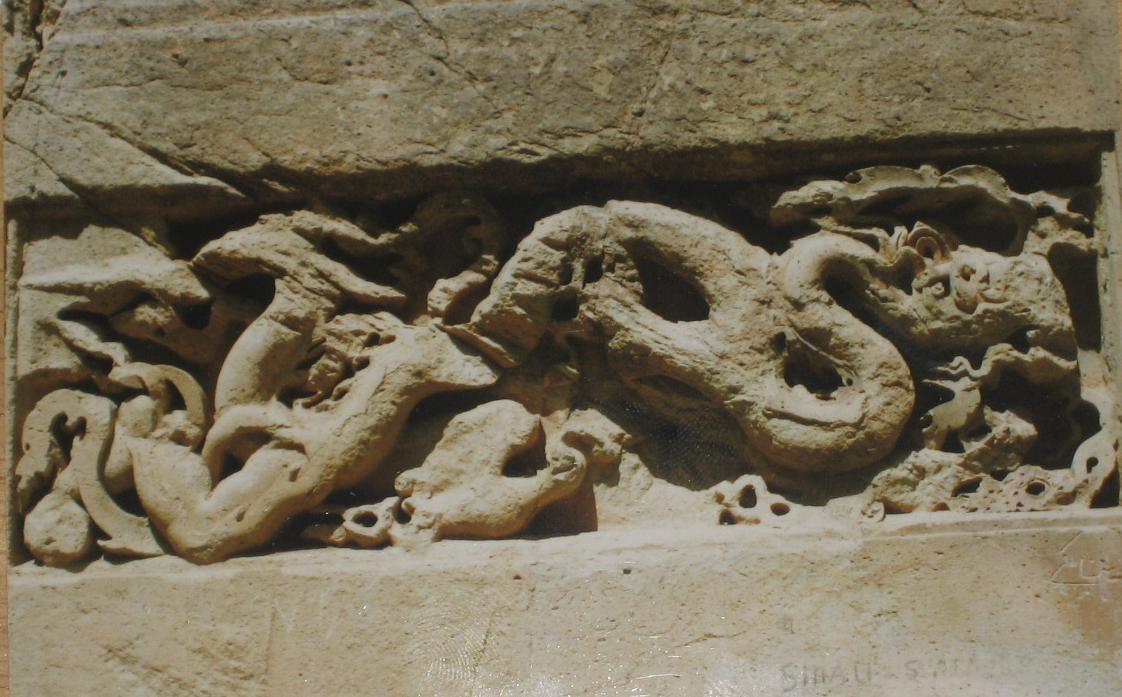
Dragon Stone of Dash Kasan Cave
