= Russian Customs Academy =

- Российская таможенная академия
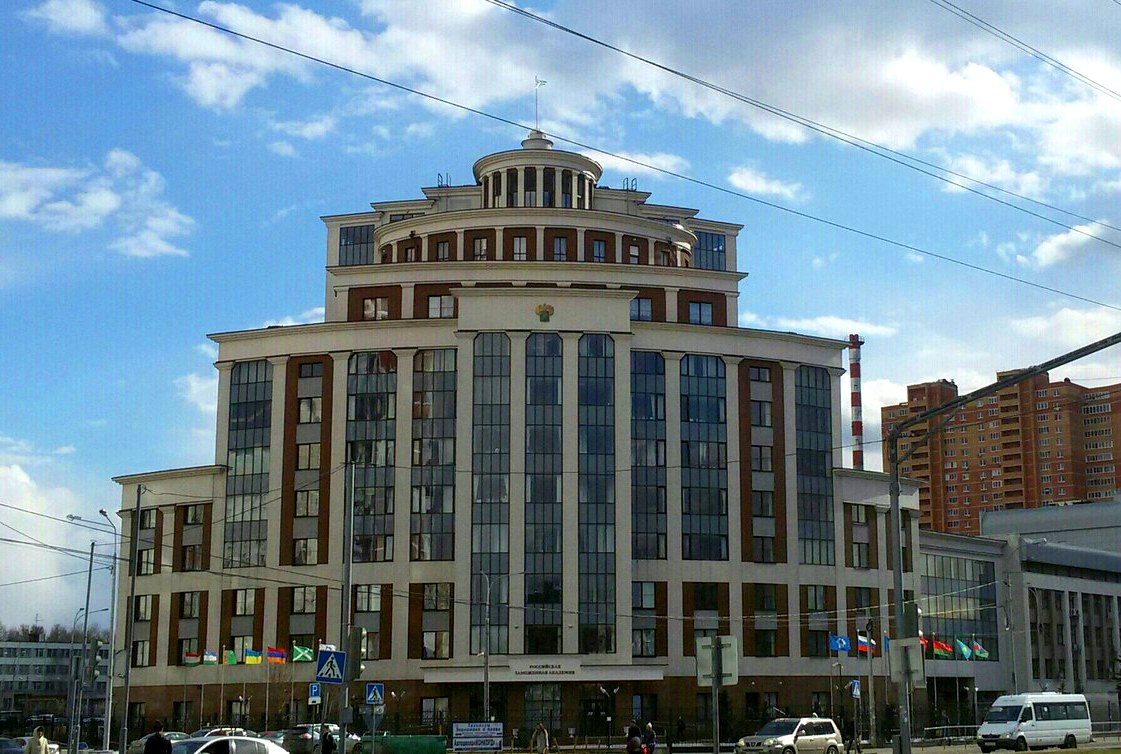
- Type: Public
- Established: 1896
- Location: Lyubertsy, Russia; 55°41′14″N 37°54′03″E
- Campus: Urban
- Website: academy.customs.gov.ru

Russian Customs Academy (Russian: «Государственное казенное образовательное учреждение высшего образования „Российская таможенная академия“») is a Russian state higher education institution that trains professionals for the customs authorities of Russia and the CIS countries. It is part of the Federal Customs Service of the Russian Federation, which founded the academy. It is the first and only specialized university in Russia dedicated to the training and retraining of specialists in customs. It is located in Lyubertsy and has branches in St. Petersburg, Vladivostok, and Rostov-on-Don.

== History ==
The State Customs Committee of the Russian Federation was established on October 25, 1991. To train professional personnel, the Russian Customs Academy was established on September 22, 1993, by Resolution No. 940 of the Council of Ministers and granted the status of a federal state institution. The first academic year began on October 2, 1994, with Nikolai Blinov, Doctor of Philosophy and Colonel General of the Customs Service, taking charge of the academy.

From 2006 to 2015, the head of the academy was retired Colonel General Viktor Chechevatov, who previously headed the Military Academy of the General Staff of the Armed Forces of Russia.

From April 16, 2015 to April 15, 2023 (he was dismissed from customs service by Order No. 901-KS of the Federal Customs Service of Russia dated April 10, 2023), Vladimir Mantusov, Doctor of Economics, Professor, and Major General of the Customs Service, served as head of the Russian Customs Academy.

On July 7, 2022, a court in the Moscow region sanctioned the arrest of Zalim Kerefov, vice-rector of the Russian Customs Academy, accused of illegally selling 2 kg of drugs, who committed suicide in a pre-trial detention center on July 29.

== Structure ==
The Russian Customs Academy is organized into three faculties (Customs, Economics, and Law) and three institutes (the Institute of Distance Learning, Retraining, and Advanced Training, the Research Institute, and the Institute of Law Enforcement). The educational process is organized by 24 departments.

The RCA has a multi-tiered system of higher education: bachelor's degree (4 years), specialist degree (5 years), master's degree (2 years), and postgraduate degree (3-4 years, depending on the field of study). Bachelor's degree programs include: Economics, Management, Jurisprudence, Commodity Science, and Applied Informatics; specialist degree programs include: Customs; master's degree programs include: Jurisprudence, Economics, and Management; and postgraduate programs include: Economics, Jurisprudence, and Computer Science and Engineering.

The Russian Customs Academy offers full-time, part-time and correspondence forms of education.
