= Jannat Salimova =

Azerbaijani theatre director

Jannat Salimova Cənnət Səlimova
- Born: January 20, 1940 (age 85); Baku, Azerbaijan SSR, USSR
- Other names: Janette Salimova
- Education: Azerbaijan State University
- Occupation: theatre director
- Years active: 1967–present
- Relatives: Lotfi A. Zadeh
- Awards

Jannat or Janette Salimova Alibeyovna (Azerbaijani: Cənnət və ya Canetta Səlimova Əlibəyovna, born January 20, 1940) is an Azerbaijani theatre director, People's Artiste of Azerbaijan (1998), Professor of the Azerbaijan State University of Culture and Arts, founder of the Camera Theater of Azerbaijan.

== Biography ==
Jannat Salimova was born on January 20, 1940, in Baku. In 1957-1962 she studied at the faculties of philology of the Azerbaijan State University, and was drama director of the Leningrad State Institute of Theatre, Music, and Cinema in 1962–1967. Previously, she worked as a director in the Academic Russian Drama Theatre and Academic Theatre of Musical Comedy.

She was the founder and artistic director of the Baku Camera Theater. Jannat Salimova is a professor at Azerbaijan State University of Culture and Arts. From 2009 to 2012, he worked as the chief director of the Azerbaijan State Theatre of Young Spectators. Currently, she works as a technical director in this theater.

== Awards ==
- Honored Art Worker of the Azerbaijan SSR — January 10, 1978
- Order of the Badge of Honour
- People's Artiste of Azerbaijan — May 24, 1998
- Shohrat Order — January 17, 2000
- Sharaf Order — January 17, 2020
