= Kamaladdin Heydarov =

Azerbaijani politician (born 1961)

- Kəmaləddin Heydərov
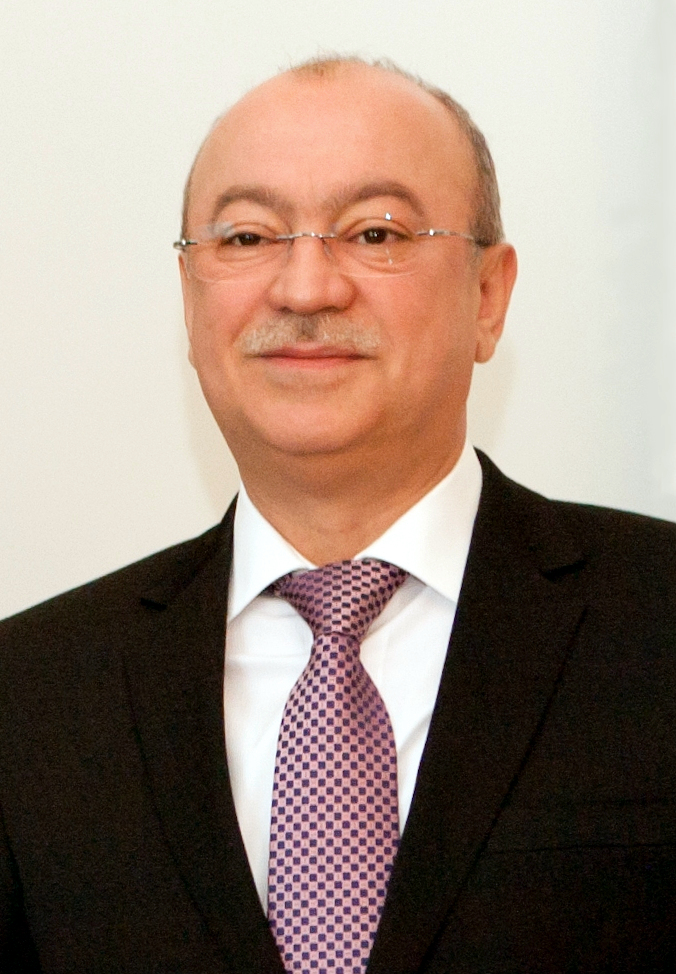
- Heydarov in 2011

Minister of Emergency Situations
- Incumbent
- Assumed office 6 February 2006
- President: Ilham Aliyev
- Preceded by: office established

Chairman of State Customs Committee
- In office 1995 – 6 February 2006
- President: Heydar Aliyev; Ilham Aliyev
- Succeeded by: Aydin Aliyev

Personal details
- Born: 15 July 1961 (age 64) Nakhchivan, Azerbaijan SSR, USSR
- Parent: Fattah Heydarov (father)

Military service
- Allegiance: Azerbaijan
- Branch/service: Ministry of Emergency Situations
- Rank: Colonel General

Kamaladdin Heydarov Fattah oglu (Azerbaijani: Kəmaləddin Heydərov Fəttah oğlu; born 15 July 1961) is an Azerbaijani politician and businessperson, serving as the Minister of Emergency Situations.

He has close ties to the ruling Aliyev family in Azerbaijan. BBC News described Heydarov as among "the wealthiest and most powerful in the governing elite" in Azerbaijan. His family owns a network of offshore companies. He chaired the State Customs Committee from 1995 to 2006.

== Early life ==
Heydarov was born on 15 July 1961 in Nakhchivan City, Azerbaijan. He has graduated from Baku State University with a degree in Geography.

In 1992, he left Azerbaijan for Uzbekistan and opened several business firms there.

== Political career ==
He founded a company called Gilan in the 1980s, but the details about the company are opaque.

President Heydar Aliyev appointed Heydarov as Chairman of the State Customs Committee in 1995. In this role he was widely reported to have extracted bribes from companies importing goods into Azerbaijan. According to a 2010 leaked US diplomatic cable, Heydarov accrued "massive wealth" as chairman of “an agency that is notoriously corrupt, even by Azerbaijani standards.”

On February 6, 2006, Heydarov was appointed the Minister of Emergency Situations, a newly formed ministry.

BBC News described Heydarov as among "the wealthiest and most powerful in the governing elite" in Azerbaijan.

=== Daphne Project scandal ===
Heydarov was implicated in the Daphne Project investigation into secretive investments across Europe and the Middle-East through a Maltese bank.

== Personal life ==
Heydarov is married. He and his wife have two children, Nijat and Tale. The sons own a network of offshore companies that have invested tens of millions of pounds in Europe.

Heydarov has composed songs under the name Kamal. His latest album is called Sənə güvəndiyim dağlar (Azerbaijani: The mountains to lean on). His songs have been performed by famous singers such as Flora Kerimova, Ilhama Guliyeva, Aygun Kazimova, Zulfiyya Khanbabayeva.

== See also ==
- Cabinet of Azerbaijan
