= Haydarov =

Haydarov, feminine: Haydarova, also Haýdarow, Khaydarov, feminine: Khaydarova is a surname. Notable people with the surname include:

- Alik Haýdarow
- Azizbek Haydarov (born 1985), Uzbek footballer
- Ravshan Haydarov (born 1961), Uzbek footballer and manager
- Utkirbek Haydarov (born 1974), Uzbek boxer
