= Tofig Guliyev =

Soviet-Azerbaijani composer (1917–2000)

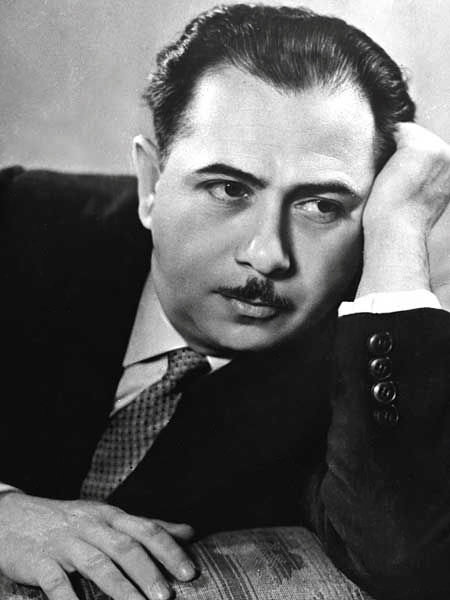
- Guliyev before 1959
- Born: Tofig Alakbar oglu Guliyev; November 7, 1917; Baku, Russian Empire
- Died: October 4, 2000 (aged 82); Baku, Azerbaijan
- Occupations: Composer; pianist; conductor

Chairperson of the Composers Union of Azerbaijan
- In office 1900–2000
- Preceded by: Agshin Alizadeh
- Succeeded by: Franghiz Ali-Zadeh

Tofig Alakbar oglu Guliyev (Azerbaijani: Tofiq Ələkbər oğlu Quliyev; 7 November 1917 – 4 October 2000) was a Soviet and Azerbaijani composer, pianist, and conductor.

== Biography ==
Tofig Guliyev was born in Baku on 7 November 1917, in the family of salary worker. He became a student of the Azerbaijan State Conservatoire when he was 12 years old due to his musical talent. But in 1934, he became a student of Baku Conservatoire, where he studied in two faculties - fortepiano (in professor I.S.Aysberg’s class) and composer (in professor S. G. Strasser’s class). In the conservatoire, young Tofig Guliyev familiarized with works of great classics of the past – Bach, Beethoven, Tchaikovsky, Schubert and other composers. The brilliant talent of Tofig Guliyev drew music communities’ attention to him and soon, in 1936, Azerbaijan’s National Committee of Education sent Tofig Guliyev to Moscow State Conservatory named after Tchaikovsky on Uzeyir Hajibeyov’s advice and initiative. There he learnt conduct and for some time studied in fortepiano class of professor Neyhauz. Soon he began to work as a pianist at the well-known Estrada orchestra of those times under A. Zfasmann’s guidance, where he successfully worked till 1939.

== Early creativity ==
Tofig Guliyev’s first experiences on poems began at the beginning of the 1930s. In 1931, being the student at the Asaf Zeynally Music School in Baku, Tofig Guliyev wrote a song to Mirza Alakbar Sabir’s poem – “About a schoolboy” according to his teacher’s advice. Beginning in 1935, Tofig Guliyev began to work as a conductor at Azerbaijan Drama Theatre named after Mashadi Azizbeyov. Tofig Guliyev’s activity as folklorist, which was begun in the 1930s, had a great importance not only in the creative biography of the composer, but also in the musical-social life of Azerbaijan. Tofig Guliyev was one of the creative personalities, who had great services to the development and popularization of Azerbaijani folklore. He is one of the first composers of Azerbaijan, who accomplished note records of mugham. In 1936, mugham recordings “Rast”, “Segah”, “Zabul”, “Dugah” were released by him (jointly with composer Z. Bagirov).

In 1939, returning to Baku, Tofig Guliyev engaged in organizational work for the establishment of a national orchestra, the active work of which concurred with the beginning of the Great Patriotic War in 1941. The Estrada orchestra, which was established by the composer and called Red Army ensemble, was allotted to the 402nd infantry division and had concerts in the front line during the war. Tofig Guliyev wrote many patriotic songs for the division: “Not a step further!” (to Surkov’s lyrics), “Tender hand”(to Dorizo’s lyrics), “About a Russian girl”, “Fighter’s song”. In 1943, the ensemble was divided into two groups. One of them, called Red Naval, was managed by Tofig Guliyev. The ensemble often performed at the front, at the Caucasian front, in Crimea, went to concerts for parts of the Army in Iran.

After the end of the war, Tofig Guliyev began his composer activity at Azerbaijan State Academic Russian Drama Theatre named after Samad Vurgun, Azerbaijan State Theatre for Young Spectators named after Maxim Gorky. During some years with theatres, he wrote songs for spectacles “The twelfth night” of W. Shakespeare, “A young guard” of Fadeyev, “Aydin” of Jafar Jabbarly, “On the distant shores” of H.Seyidbeyli and I.Gasimov, “Brothers” of Rasul Rza, “Strange man” of N. Hikmat, “Shirvan’s beauty” of A. Mamedkhanly.

== 1940-1950s ==
In the 1940s, Tofig Guliyev began to work also in cinema, actively continuing it in subsequent decades. During that time, he wrote a lot of songs dedicated to the Motherland – “A song about the Motherland”, “Azerbaijan”, “Ala Dag”. Tofig Guliyev began creative collaboration with the eminent singer Rashid Behbudov, one of the best performers of the composer’s songs. Creative duet had concert tours in cities of the Soviet Union, which were followed by great success. A collection “National dances of Azerbaijan”(1951), “15 National dances of Azerbaijan” (1955) and two-volume edition “Azerbaijani songs” (1956–1958) released under the great singer Bulbul’s edition, was the result of his expeditions in the regions of Azerbaijan. In subsequent years, the composer continued his recording and processing work of folklore materials. In the 1950s-1960s, he handled Arabian, Indian, Bulgarian and Chinese songs. Tofig Guliyev’s work on recording and publication of mughams had a great importance for national musical culture.

In spite of the great creative and rendering achievements, Tofig Guliyev preferred to continue his education and in 1948, renewed his education at the Moscow Conservatory in the conductor class of professor A.Ginsburg and in composition class of professor K.Golubyev. Graduating from the conservatory in 1951, Tofig Guliyev entered the graduate course of the Moscow Conservatory, where he ended his education under the guidance of the great conductor Alexander Gauk. In 1954, returning to Baku, he began to teach at the Azerbaijan State Conservatoire named after Uzeyir Hajibeyov. There he led student orchestra, opera and orchestra classes, taught instrumentation. In 1958, the composer began to work in Azerbaijan State Academic Philharmonic Hall named after Muslim Magomayev, and later became the director. During these years, the composer wrote poems fortepiano and among them were “Lezghinka”, “Variations”, songs “Branchy gold” (Jarkov’s lyrics), “Don’t be proud”, “I love you”, “Kind country, Azerbaijan”. In 1959, the composer created “Song about Moscow” cantata for the second decade of Azerbaijani culture in Moscow. During these years, he wrote a lot of songs for drama spectacles, for “Anthony Grant’s crime” piece by M. Volibranskiy and R.Rubinstein, “When blossoms acacia” of M.Vishnyakov. During these decades were written a lot of musical pieces for some films by Tofig Guliyev, which achieved great popularity “Under sultry sky” (1958), “Bakhtiyar” (1959), “Could he be forgiven?” (1959).

== 1960-1970s ==
Active creativity in musical-social activity was mentioned in the 1960s-1970s. Tofig Guliyev is the participant of many international conferences, festivals, art holidays. In 1962, he took part at conference dedicated to development problem of musical art and exchange of cultural experience by the Academy of Arts invitation and later he participated at holding of Days of Azerbaijani art in Czechoslovakia, where he composed songs “Bratislava” and “Song about Prague”, which became popular in Czechoslovakia.

During this period, Tofig Guliyev led the delegation of Azerbaijani actors in Bulgaria, Poland and Italy. For many years, he was the first secretary of the Union of Azerbaijani Composers. Give consideration to training of new personnel of composers, led holdings of composer plenums, musical festivals, conferences, conventions. He often made reports and articles dedicated to various problems of Azerbaijani art.

In 1966, during the Decade of Russian culture in Azerbaijan, Tofig Guliyev composed a new song-“Kind country, Azerbaijan” with a composer Solovyev-Sedoy. During this period, he created a cycle of international songs: “Moldova” (1966), a cycle of songs about Georgia. In 1972, The International Exhibition Demonstrating Azerbaijani Culture was opened with Tofig Guliyev’s “Oilmen” song in Brussels.

In the 1980s to 1990s, Tofig Guliyev was engaged in social activities.

Tofig Guliyev’s creativity was highly evaluated-he was awarded the title of People's Artiste of the Azerbaijan SSR, and title of the laureate of Lenin Komsomol Prize of the Azerbaijan SSR.

He died on October 5, 2000, at the age of 82 after a prolonged illness. He was buried in the Alley of Honor, in Baku.

== Activity in the film sphere ==
Tofig Guliyev was the author of melodies and songs to the film: “Meeting” (1955), “Favourite song” (1955), “Under the sultry sky” (1957), “Stepmother” (1958), “Telephonist girl” (1962), “Nesimi” (1973), “Dervish is blowing up Paris” (1976), “A lion ran away from house” (1977), “Value of happiness” (1976), “Mother-in-law” (1978), “A paradise will not meet you here” (1982), “Memories about the pomegranate tree” (1984), “Outside” (1991).

== Memory ==
In 2009, was held an evening dedicated to the memory of the composer in Russian information-cultural centre.

== See also ==
- List of People's Artistes of the Azerbaijan SSR
