= Ministry of Emergency Situations (Azerbaijan) =

Ministry of Emergency Situations of Azerbaijan Republic
- Azerbaijani: Azərbaycan Respublikası Fövqəladə Hallar Nazirliyi
- Logo of the Ministry of Emergency Situations of Azerbaijan Republic

Agency overview
- Formed: December 16, 2005
- Type: Ministry
- Jurisdiction: Government of Azerbaijan
- Headquarters: Baku, Azerbaijan
- Minister responsible: Colonel General Kamaladdin Heydarov, Minister of Emergency Situations
- Agency executives: Rafail Mirzayev, First Deputy Minister; Faik Tagi-zade, Deputy Minister; Etibar Mirzayev, Deputy Minister; Ragim Latifov, Deputy Minister; Orujali Hajiyev, Deputy Minister
- Website: www.fhn.gov.az

The Ministry of Emergency Situations of Azerbaijan Republic (Azerbaijani: Azərbaycan Respublikası Fövqəladə Hallar Nazirliyi) is the central executive body within the cabinet of Azerbaijan responsible for protecting the population from natural and manmade disasters. The ministry is headed by Kamaladdin Heydarov.

== Legislation ==
The Civil Defence of the Republic of Azerbaijan is controlled by the Law “About Civil Defence”, which was introduced by the Decree of the President of the Republic of Azerbaijan in 1998. In accordance with this law the Cabinet of the Republic has issued the Decision “About the Provisions of Civil Defence”, and approved normative documents.

== Activities ==
The ministry protects the population and territories from emergency situations, fire, water hazards. It secures the mining industry, ensures the security of petroleum and petroleum products, prevents accidents with established emergency prevention and mitigation, and ensures implementation of policies and regulations developed.

=== Regulations ===
In order to organize control in different in scale emergencies, the decisions are done centralized or at the local level. The Civil Defence Organization of Azerbaijan has been restructured under the authority of the Ministry of Emergency Situations.

== Organization ==
According to the requirements of legislation “About the Civil Defence” all government bodies (central and local), industrial installations of different property rights have “Plans of Civil Defence”. These are programs for fires, earthquakes, radioactive and chemical contamination, military conflict, and other issues. Control and execution of protective measures in emergencies is responsibility of Government of the Republic, central and local executive bodies, leaders of installations. The Civil Defence Department of the Ministry of Defence of the Republic of Azerbaijan cooperates with the Community of Independent States (CIS) and the International Civil Defence Organization (ICDO).

== Structure ==
The structure of the Ministry includes:

- State Fire Service
- State Fire Control Service
- Troops of the Civil Defence
- State Agency of Stock
- The State Agency for Control over the safety of construction
- Agency for the safe conduct of work in industry and mining control
- State Inspection for low-intensive ships
- State Water Reserves Agency
- Special Risky Rescue Service
- Rescue Service of the Caspian Basin
- Crisis Management Center
- State Agency on Nuclear and Radiological Activity Regulation (SANRAR)
- Special Works "Isotope"
- Operative Investigation Department
- Material-Technical Supply Department
- Central Laboratory
- Ambulance rescue
- Office of Capital Construction
- Aviation Detachment
- Training Center
- Fitness Club
- Medical Service
- Regional Centers
- Academy of the Ministry of Emergency Situations

=== State Fire Service ===
The State Fire Service is responsible for protecting the population the Republic of Azerbaijan and their properties by providing necessary means in order to stop unwanted fires. Within its competence, it tends to organize divisions (it also could be voluntary from local population) for overcoming the obstacles resulted from fire.

=== State Fire Control Service ===
The SFCS as an executive body monitors regulations and orders related to the fire safety. If it is necessary to certificate goods and services in the mentioned field. Additionally, it supervises mandatory fire insurance of properties of the people that involved in business related activities.

=== State Agency of Stock ===
The State Agency of Stock involves in the process of storing reserves for guaranteeing the security of the state in the case of emergent circumstances. By following the state policy of the Republic of Azerbaijan, the service attends in arrangement of and management on state material reserves. The tasks of international humanitarian aids are implemented by this branch of the ministry.

=== State Agency for Control over the safety of construction ===
The State Agency for Control over the safety of construction observes implementation of state policy related to safety requirements in all areas of construction activity. Within its authority defined by the legislation, it carries out state control in this field in the country.

=== Agency for the safe conduct of work in industry and mining control ===
The service mainly focuses on providing security in industry and mountain-mine related works in order not to encounter technical issues and emergent situation along with the relevant state bodies.

=== State Water Reserves Agency ===
The agency is established to keep the main reservoirs of the state under its control in order to maintain their reserve and structural integrity. It also monitors other surface and groundwater reserves.

=== State Agency on Nuclear and Radiological Activity Regulation ===
The agency ensures that the population and population the territory of the Republic of Azerbaijan are safe from nuclear and radiological activities by exercising defined state policy.

=== State Inspection for low-intensive ships ===
The Service organizes and implements technical supervision of the state control and exploitation of small capacity vessels controls the safety of the operation of small-sized ships' bases. It controls and co-ordinates diving and search activities on the beaches, water basins and other reservoirs, ensuring the safety of people in the water, as well as in search and rescue of people in water basins and other water reserves.

=== Special Risky Rescue Service ===
SRRS established react immediately to emergency circumstances. It organizes special risky search and accident-rescue operations when tries to overcome the consequences of emergency circumstances and provides immediate medical aid to injured population. The protection of strategically important objects, facilities and other enterprises different sources is provided by this service within its authority.

=== Rescue Service of the Caspian basin ===
The service attempts to take measures against disasters and eliminate the emergency circumstances and their outcomes. It also tries to eliminate the consequence of issues related to spill of oil or oil products. The service implements search and rescue operations during emergency situations inside of the territory of the Republic of Azerbaijan and also in Azerbaijan sector of the Caspian Sea.

=== Operative Investigation Department ===
OID carries out initial investigation for finding out the reasons of incidents during emergency situations. The initial legal measures are provided by this service in the case of criminal incidents.

=== Material-Technical Supply Department ===
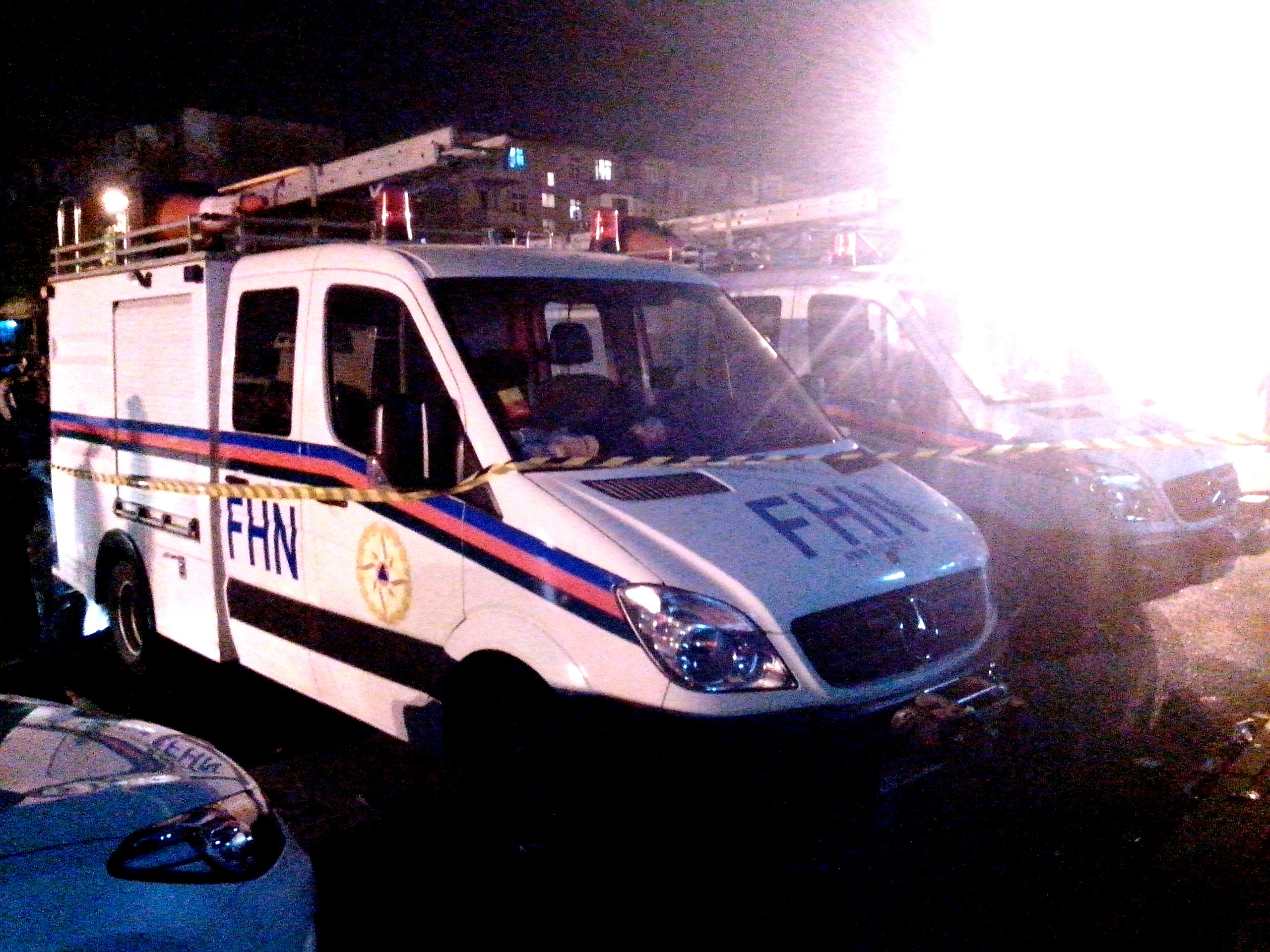

Material-Technical Supply Department provides logistical supply and technical needs of the Ministry within its authority.

=== Medical Service ===
The medical examination and treatment of the personnel of the Ministry as well as the members of their families are provided by this service. The service has also other duties such as ensuring medical guarantee for recruitment of military units, making predictions on epidemiological circumstances in the areas suffered from disasters, preventing the spread of diseases, etc.

== Training ==
Training of specialists is done at the Training Centre of Civil Defence and at local courses of Civil Defence.

=== Academy of the Ministry of Emergency Situations ===
The Academy aims to prepare skilled graduate staff for the Ministry, and also apply necessary means in order to increase its employees’ qualifications.

== International relations ==
The Ministry of Emergency Situations in its activity gave special importance to international practice, a great experience on the management of emergency states cooperation pays special attention to the development. The Ministry cooperates with following international organizations: the United Nations, NATO, OSCE, CIS, GUAM, OPCW, IAEA, and the BSEC. In order to improve skills in the field of emergency situations employees of MES are studying in Russia, Ukraine, Belarus, and Germany in the fields of emergency management. These are the countries which ministry cooperates with: the Russian Federation, the United States, Jordan, Turkey, Ukraine, Belarus, France, and Germany. From 24 to 27 September 2007, in Baku, MES (in cooperation with International Academy of Science) developed an international symposium on the theme of "Natural Cataclysms and Global Problems of the Modern Civilization".

== Gallery ==
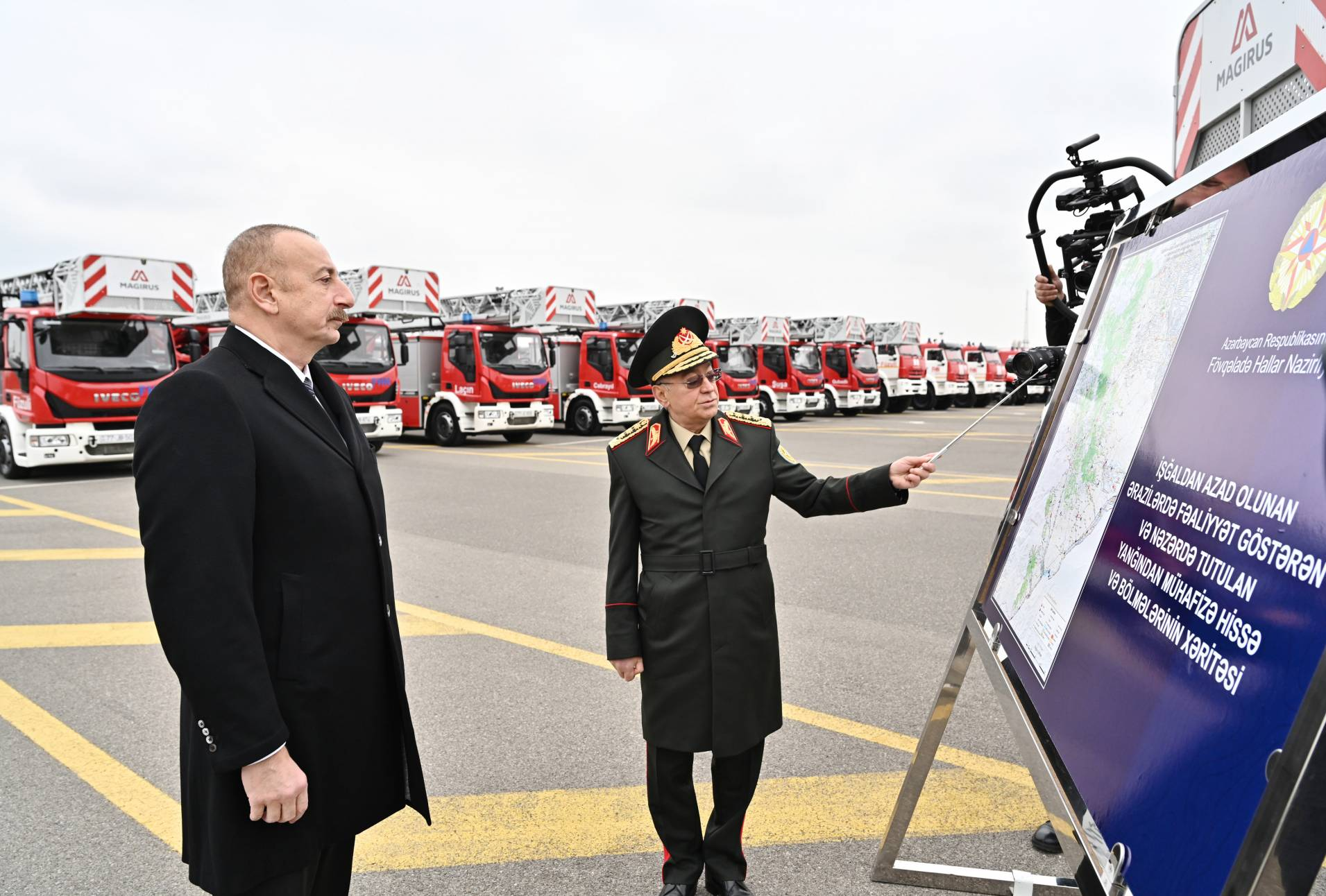

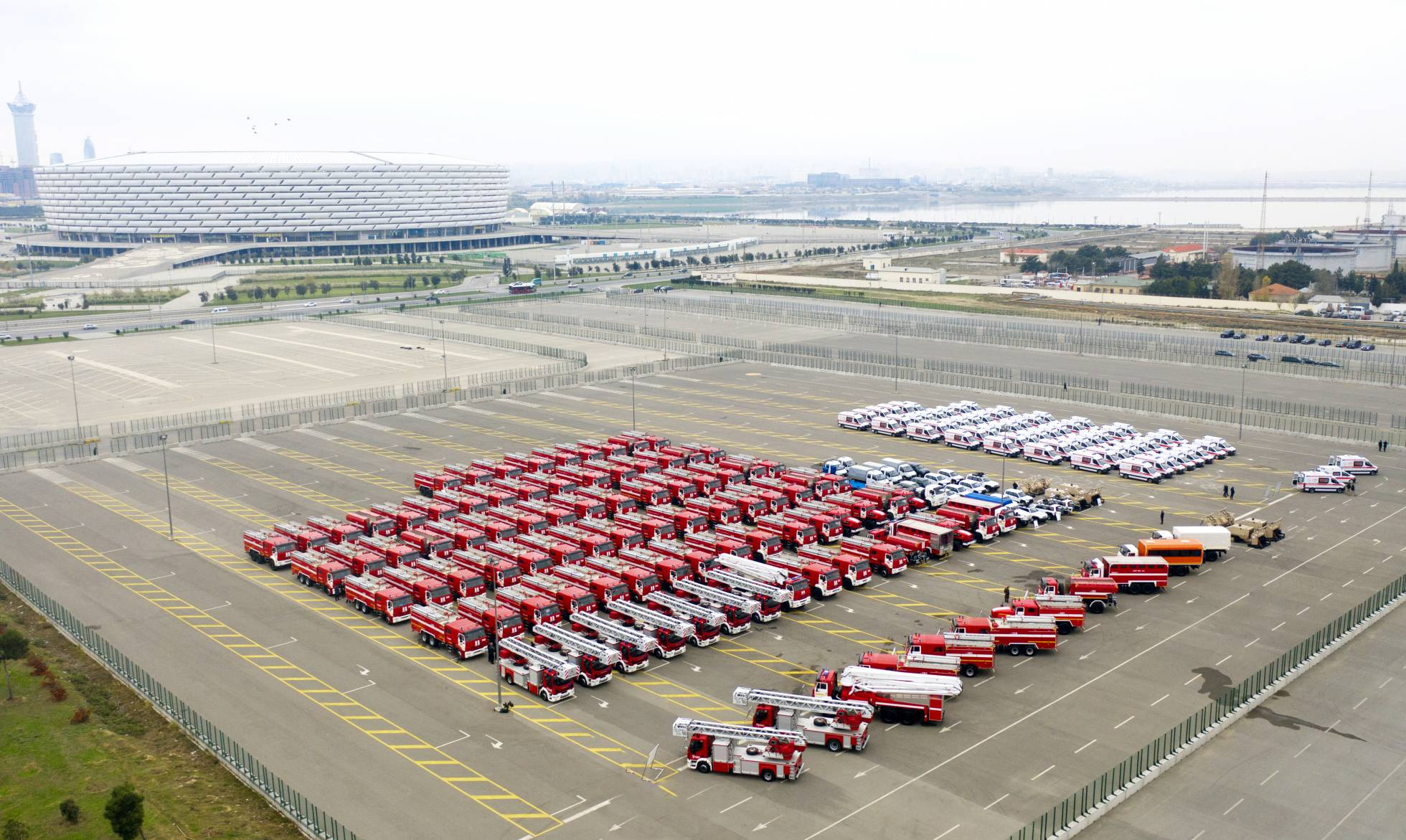

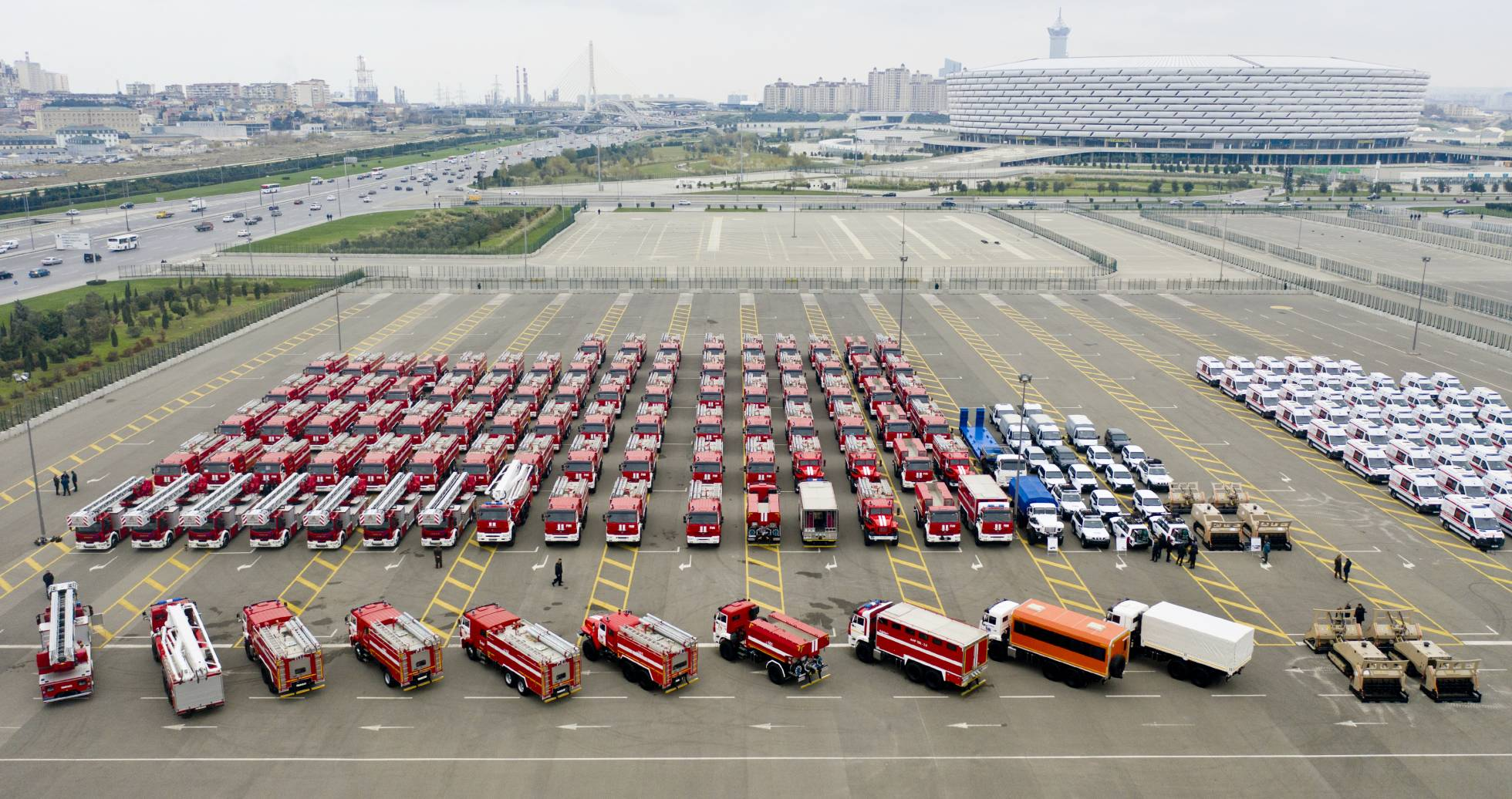

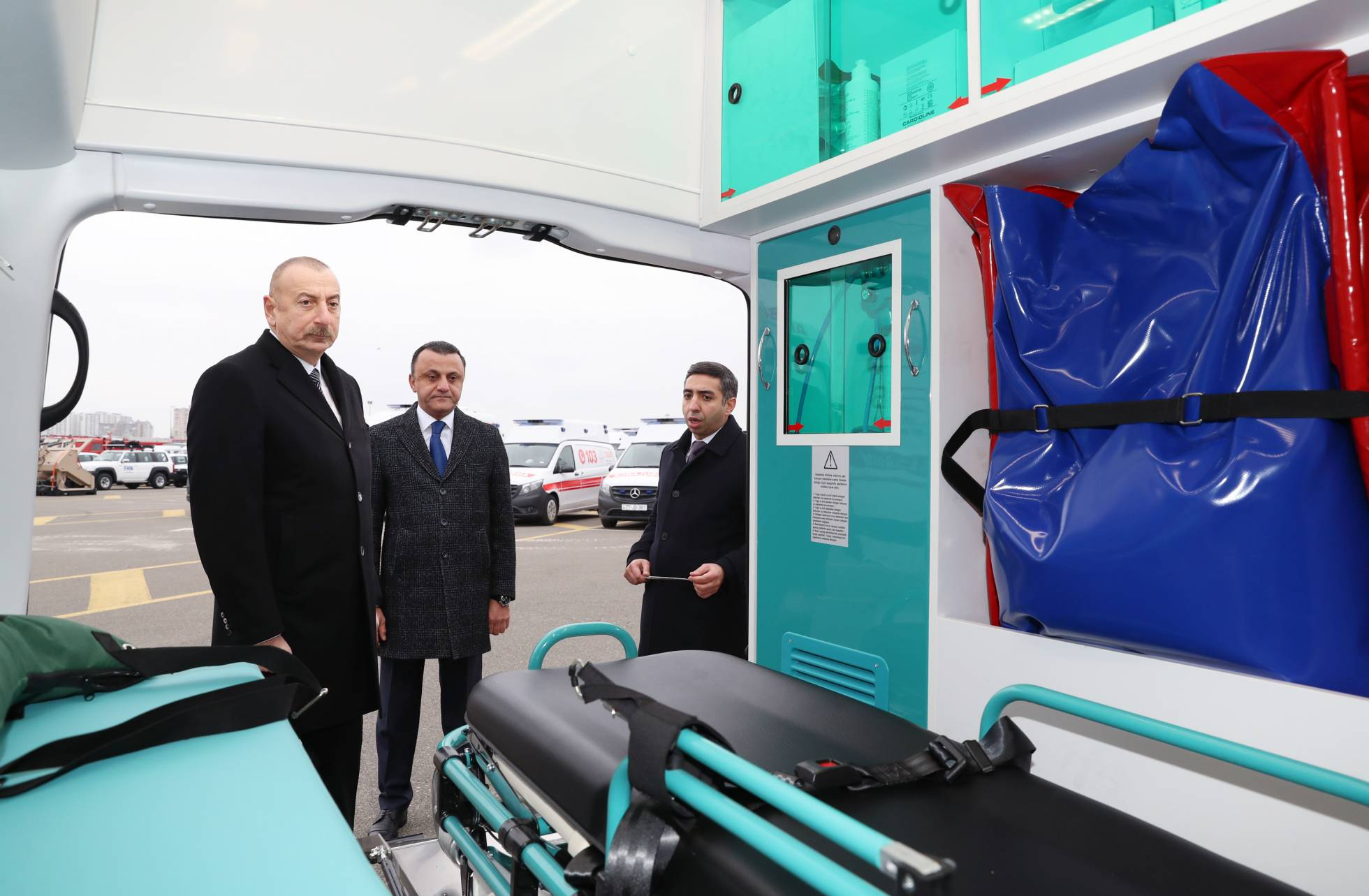
