= Hasan Anami Olya =

Iranian opera singer (born 1967)

- Born: March 15, 1967 (age 59); Tabriz, Iran
- Occupations: Opera singer, Lecturer
- Years active: 1990 – present

Hasan Anami Olya (Persian: حسن انعامي عليا; Azerbaijani: Həsən Anami Olya / Һәсән Анами Олја, IPA: [hæˈsæn ɑnɑˈmi ˈoljɑ]; born 15 March 1967) is an Iranian opera singer. Since 1997, he has been a soloist of the Azerbaijan State Academic Opera and Ballet Theatre in Baku, Azerbaijan. He has performed many concerts both in Azerbaijan and abroad, including Russia, Georgia, Turkey, Bolivia, Ukraine, France, Japan, Germany, and Dubai.

== Biography ==
Hasan Anami Olya was born in Tabriz, Iran on 15 March 1967, to a fairly well-off family. In 1972 he entered the primary school. From 1977 to 1981 he attended guidance school, and from 1981 to 1985 he studied in Vahdat Industrial High School. Then he joined the army service and completed it in 1988.

Since his childhood he had felt an attraction to music, but had no opportunity to get professional musical education, because following the Iranian Revolution no musical occupation was allowed in Iran. At age 14, he started to learn Azerbaijani music through cassette recordings. Gradually he felt he has ability to sing, and started, on his own, to learn and perform Azerbaijani songs. Some of his friends managed to create a small musical group which performed in the houses of Azerbaijani music lovers. In 1988 the government permitted the opening of private musical schools. He attended one of these schools, where he studied theory of music and solfeggio.

In 1990 he attended a concert of three tenors, and decided to sing opera as well. He went to Baku for musical education there. He spent a relatively long time managing accommodation and finding a proper school to attend. After two years he was able to join a preparatory branch of the Baku Musical Academy, vocal class. After he passed the examinations, the rector of the Academy, Mr. Bedelbeyli, allowed him to study free of charge. Then he completed his undergraduate and graduate levels of music school and now lectures at the Azerbaijan State Academic Opera and Ballet Theatre. He has been awarded the position of "People's Artist" in the Republic of Azerbaijan, which is the highest honor given to artists in that country. He has been introduced in "Azerbaijan Temporary Music Ontology" as one of the most outstanding opera singers in Azerbaijan Republic.

He is married to Narmina Afandiyeva, who is a well-known pianist in Azerbaijan. They have a son and a daughter.

== Opera repertoire ==
- Giuseppe Verdi, Duke of Mantua, (Rigoletto)
- Giuseppe Verdi, Alfredo, (La traviata)
- Giuseppe Verdi, Radames, (Aida)
- Giuseppe Verdi, Manrico, (Il trovatore)
- Giuseppe Verdi, Riccardo (Un ballo in maschera)
- Giacomo Puccini Cavaradossi (Tosca)
- Giacomo Puccini, Pinkerton (Madam Butterfly)
- Giacomo Puccini, Rudolfo (La bohème)
- Georges Bizet, Don Jose (Carmen)
- Ruggero Leoncavallo, Canio (Pagliacci)

== Awards ==
- 1997, awarded the First Prize in the Republic Vocalists' competition, Baku, Azerbaijan Republic.
- 1997, awarded the title of "Best Tenor" and the Second Prize in The 1st Byul-Byul International Vocalists' Competition, Baku, Azerbaijan Republic.
- 1998, awarded Perspectivity Prize at Tchaikovski International Competition, Moscow, Russia.
- 2002, awarded the title of "Merited Artist of the Azerbaijan Republic".
- 2002, awarded an Azerbaijan Republic President's scholarship,

== Sources ==
- Azerbaijan International magazine
- Azerbaijan Republic, Official site of the Ministry of Culture and Tourism
- Azerbaijan State Museum of Musical Culture
- Azerbaijani Music
- Azerbaijan State Academic Opera and Ballet Theater
- Bakililar (Baku inhabitants)
