= State Customs Committee (Azerbaijan) =

State Customs Committee of Azerbaijan Republic
- Azərbaycan Respublikası Dövlət Gömrük Komitəsi
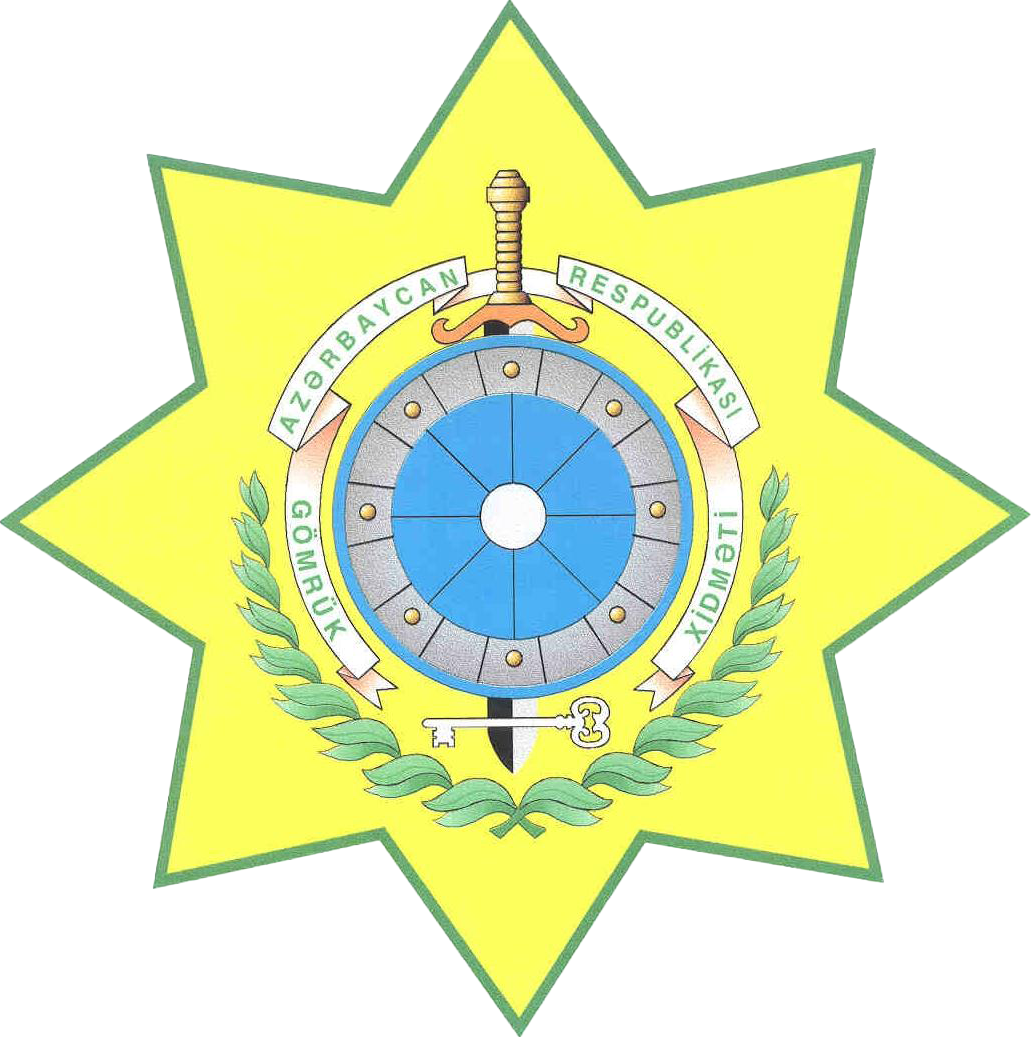
- Emblem of the committee

Agency overview
- Formed: January 30, 1992; 34 years ago
- Headquarters: 2 Inshaatchilar Avenue, Baku, Azerbaijan Republic AZ1073
- Agency executive: Shahin Baghirov, Chairman
- Website: www.customs.gov.az/az/

The State Customs Committee of Azerbaijan Republic (Azerbaijani: Azərbaycan Respublikası Dövlət Gömrük Komitəsi) is a governmental agency within the Cabinet of Azerbaijan in charge of customs clearance for imports and exports, and regulation of all customs activities within Azerbaijan Republic. The committee is headed by Shahin Baghirov.

Writing in 2016, Sarah Chayes characterizes the Customs Committee as an institution that tries to protect monopolies linked to Azerbaijan's ruling Aliyev family.

== History ==
Baku Customs Office was originally created in 1809 as a part of Astrakhan Customs District within the Russian Empire. On July 31, 1831, it was transferred to the Transcaucasian Customs District and in 1832 it was renamed to Baku Warehouse Customs. On May 4, 1847, the agency was transformed into Baku Quaranteen Customs Department. On December 8, 1897, according to a new law, the department was transformed into Baku Customs Department again and transferred to Tbilisi Caucasus Customs District on June 1, 1911. From 1918 until 1920, the committee functioned within the Ministry of Finance of Azerbaijan Democratic Republic. After the establishment of Soviet rule in Azerbaijan, the committee was restructured in 1929, 1946 and 1955. On January 27, 1989, according to the decree No. 17 of the Cabinet of Ministers of Azerbaijan SSR, Customs Office of Azerbaijan Republic was created and Astara and Julfa checkpoints were transferred under its jurisdiction. The committee was re-established as a governmental agency of Azerbaijan Republic on January 30, 1992, after the breakup of the Soviet Union and restoration of independence of Azerbaijan. Establishment of the committee helped accelerate the commodity turnover in the country and eased the import-export procedures. Over 20 customs chapters and 50 customs checkpoints were set up in Azerbaijan.

== Structure ==
The committee is headed by its chairman. The main functions of the committee are enforcing the customs policy of and preparing the development program for customs activity in the Republic of Azerbaijan; preparation of economic programs and licensing of goods and commodities passing through customs checkpoints; collection of taxes and tariffs on goods passing through the border; issuance of certificates; arranging registration of cargo and transport; participation in the development and implementation of state policies for effective utilization and protection of natural reserves in the Azerbaijani sector of the Caspian Sea; assisting law enforcement agencies of Azerbaijan in combating international terrorism and drug trafficking; provision of statistical data on foreign trade customs and special customs bodies of Azerbaijan; undertaking measures for protection of rights and interests of individuals and legal enterprises while carrying out the customs activities; participation in activities of international customs organizations; arranging scientific researches in the customs sector.

== Management ==
Chairman	Shahin Baghirov
First Deputy Chairman	Bahruz Guliyev
Deputy Chairman	Natig Shirinov
Deputy Chairman	Javad Gasimov

== Custom Committee Academy ==
Custom committee academy was created according to the order #1972 by President Ilham Aliyev. In July 2013, official Charter of academy was adopted by Decree #939 of President.

In the 2014–15 academic year, 20 students of each specialty (Economics and Law) were enrolled in the first academic year.

== See also ==
- Cabinet of Azerbaijan
- State Border Service of Azerbaijan Republic
