= Baba Kuhi Bakuvi Mosque =

Former mosque, now ruins, in Baku, Azerbaijan

Coordinates: 40°21′57.956″N 49°50′13.236″E

- Azerbaijani: Baba Kuhi Bakuvi məscidi
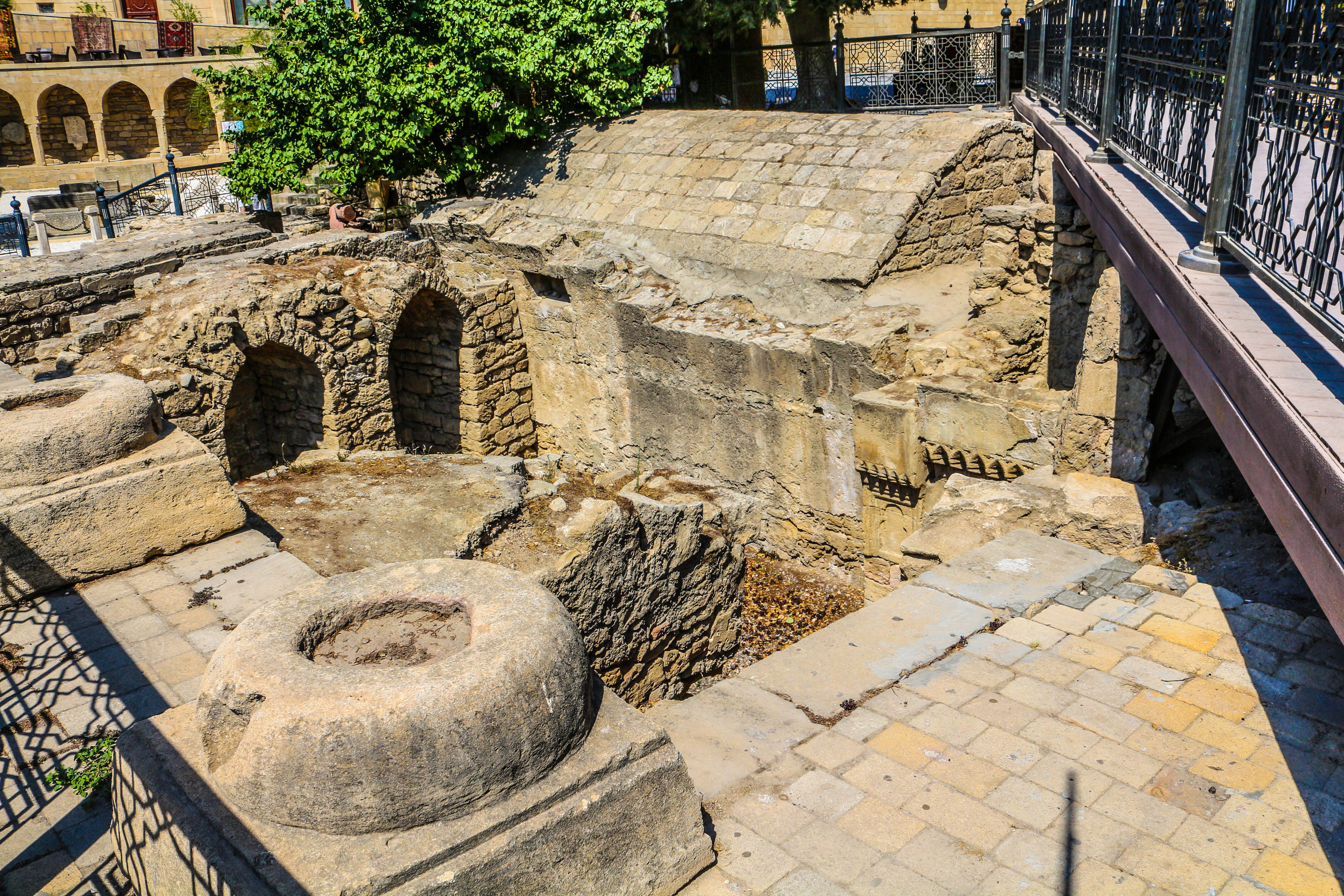
- Ruins of the former mosque, in 2016

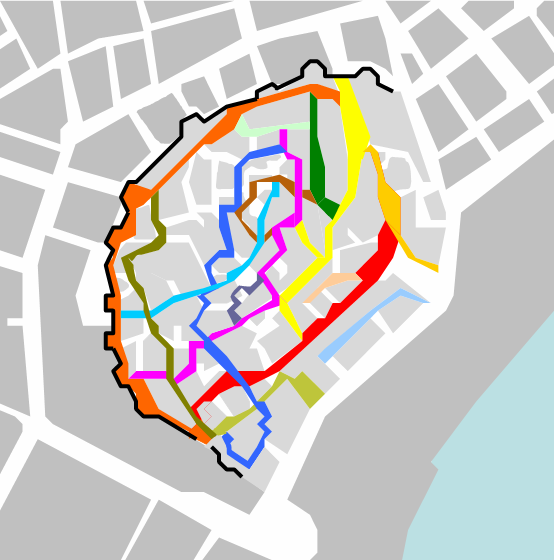
- Location of the mosque ruins in the Baku Old City

Religion
- Affiliation: Islam (former)
- Ecclesiastical or organizational status: Mosque
- Status: Abandoned (ruinous state)

Location
- Location: Old City, Baku
- Country: Azerbaijan
- Interactive map of Baba Kuhi Bakuvi Mosque

Architecture
- Type: Mosque architecture
- Style: Islamic
- Completed: 9th century
- Inscriptions: One

The Baba Kuhi Bakuvi Mosque (Azerbaijani: Baba Kuhi Bakuvi məscidi) is an ancient former mosque, now in ruins, located in the Old City of Baku, the capital of Azerbaijan. Dating from the 9th–10th centuries, it is one of the oldest mosques in Baku, and is located in the historical part of Icherisheher, north of Maiden Tower. Presumably it is belonged to the Persian scholar and theologian Baba Kuhi Bakuvi.

== Discovery ==
The mosque was discovered as a result of archaeological excavations carried out between 1990 and 1993 conducted by archaeologist Farhad Ibrahimov. An Arabic inscription was found on the altar of the mosque, written in kufi script and saying, "Power belongs to Allah (God)." This inscription was read by the epigraphist Meshadikhanum Neymat. The paleographic features of the inscription allowed researchers to attribute the monument to the 9th–10th centuries.

As a result of small-scale excavations in 1998, two rooms of the mosque were discovered. The mosque, including the adjacent rooms and a colonnade of lancet arches, was a single complex.

== Gallery ==
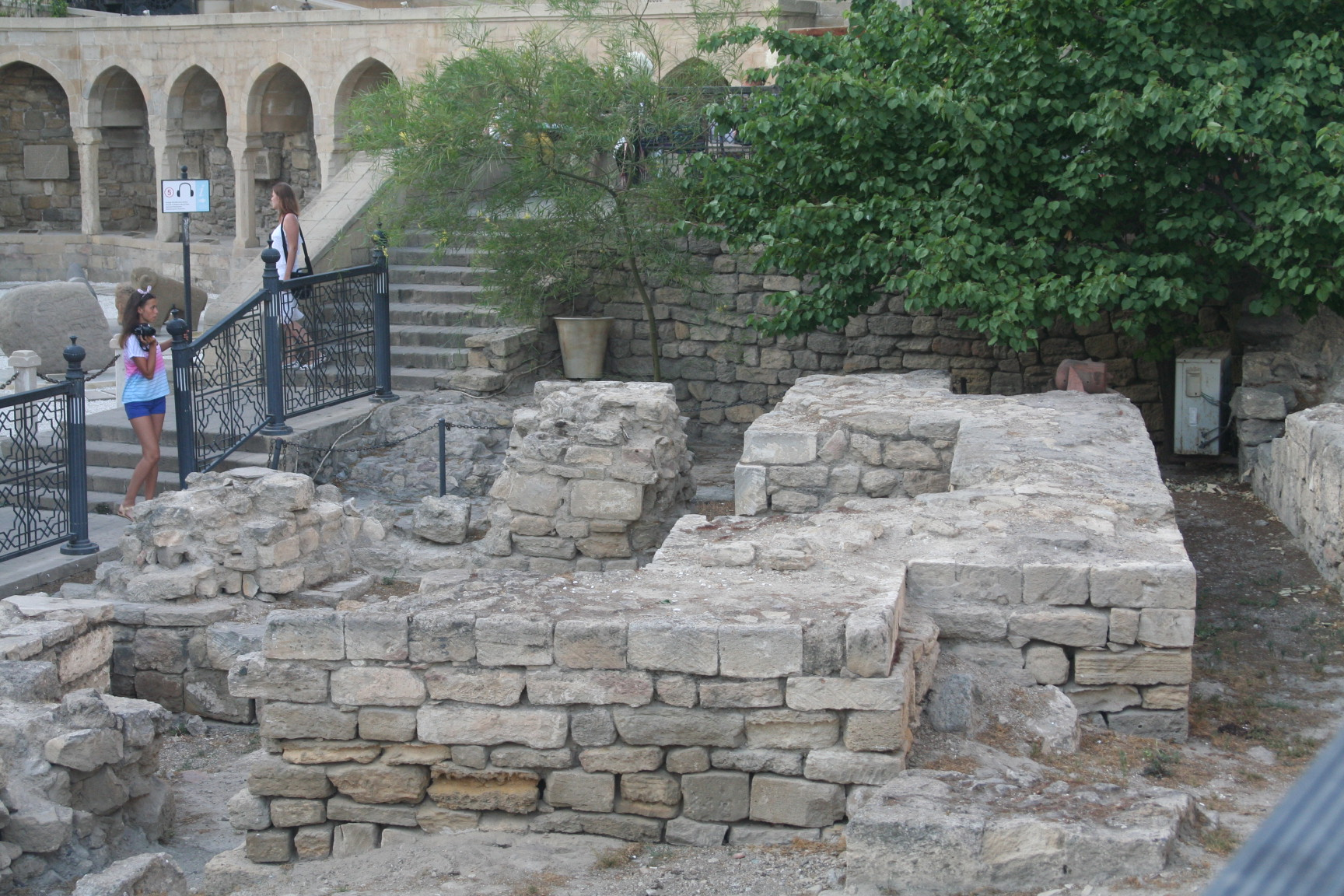

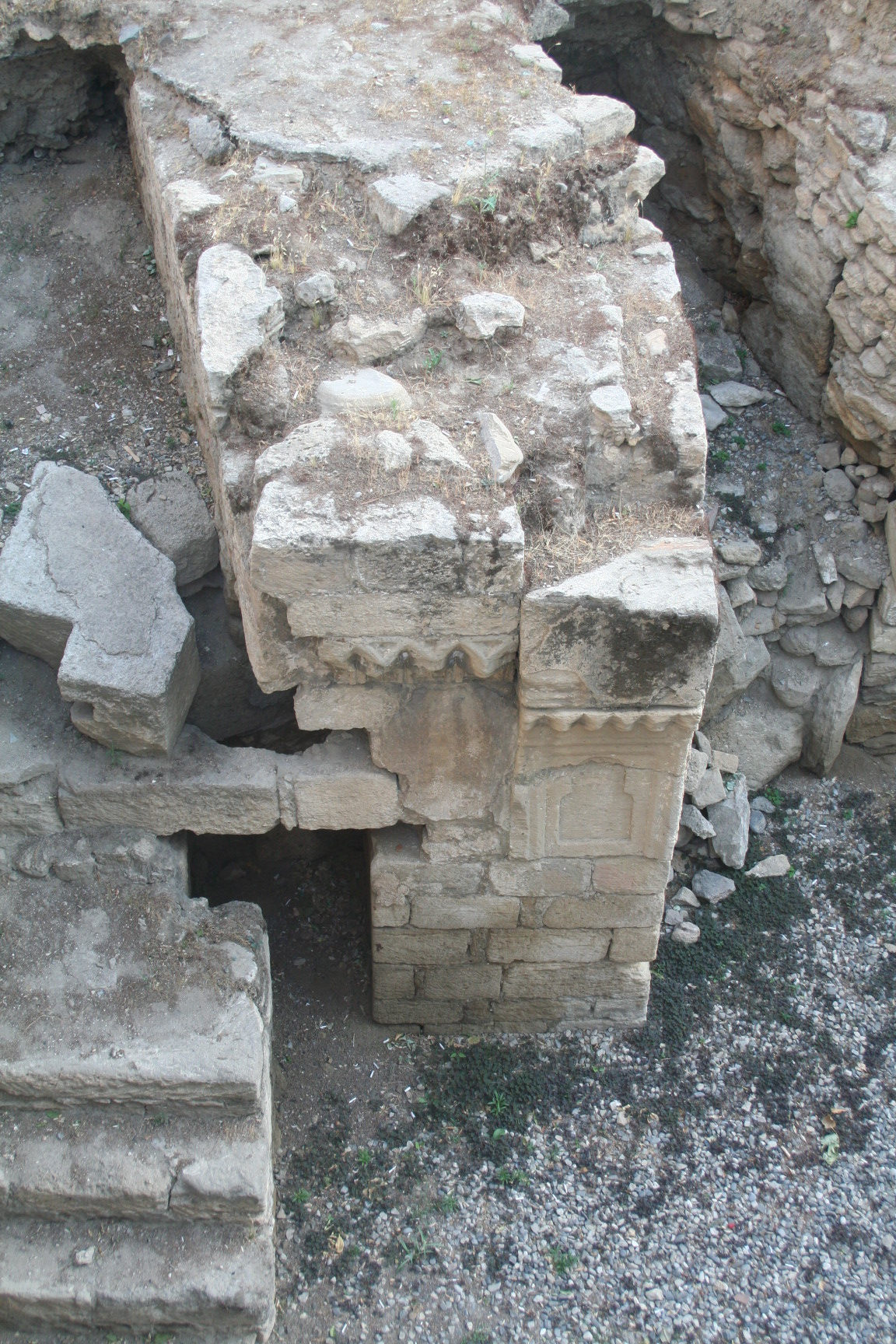

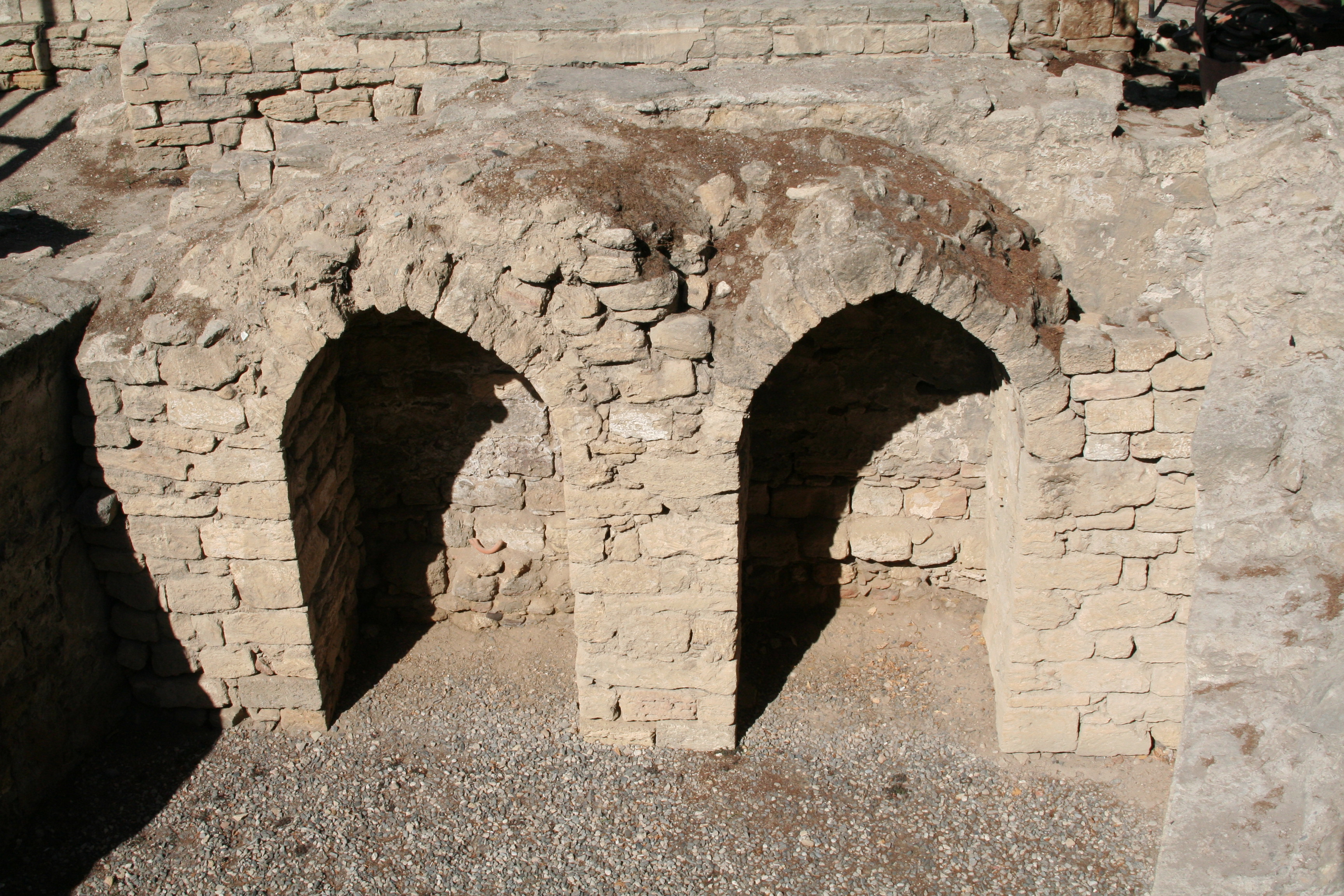

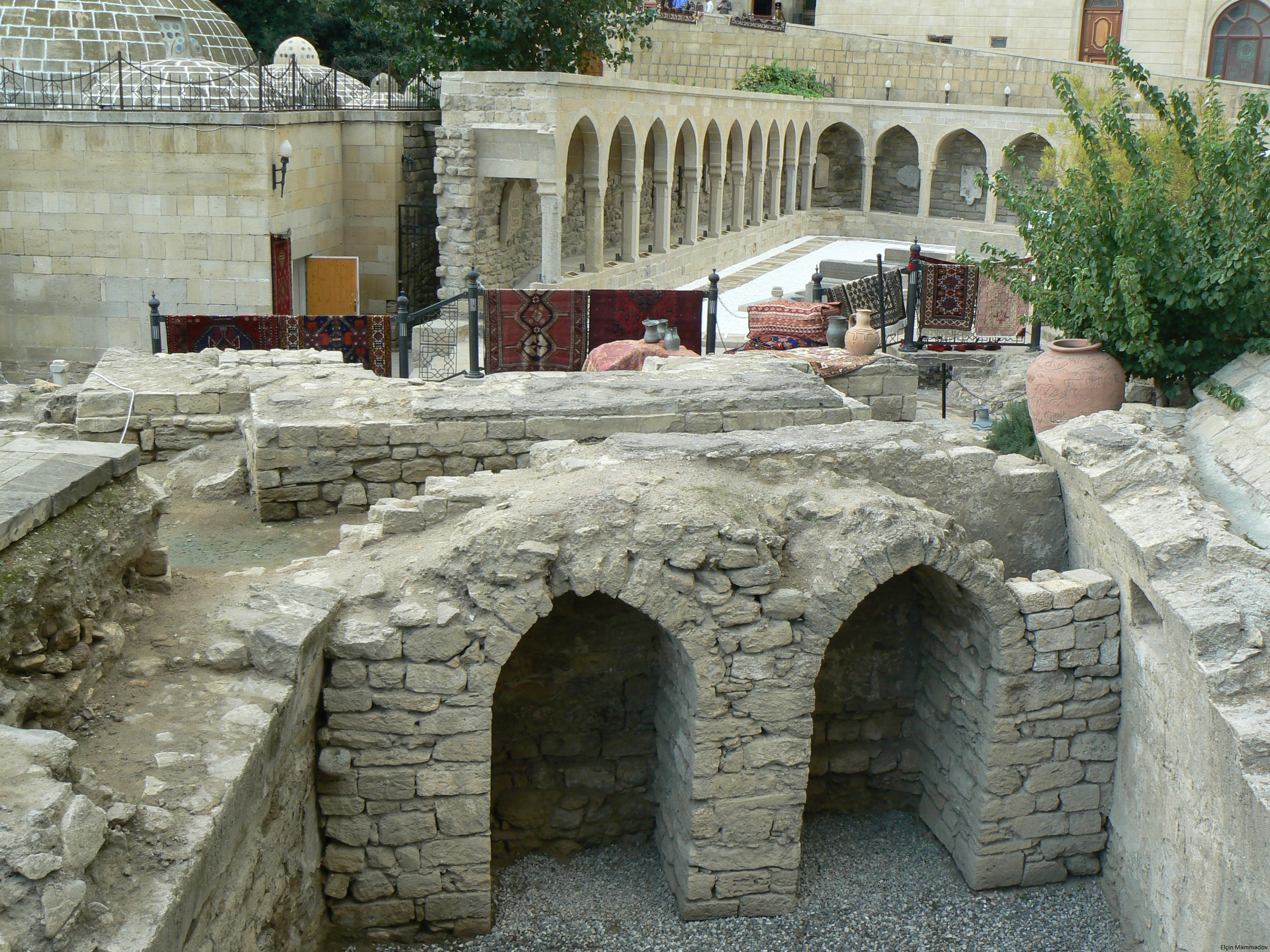

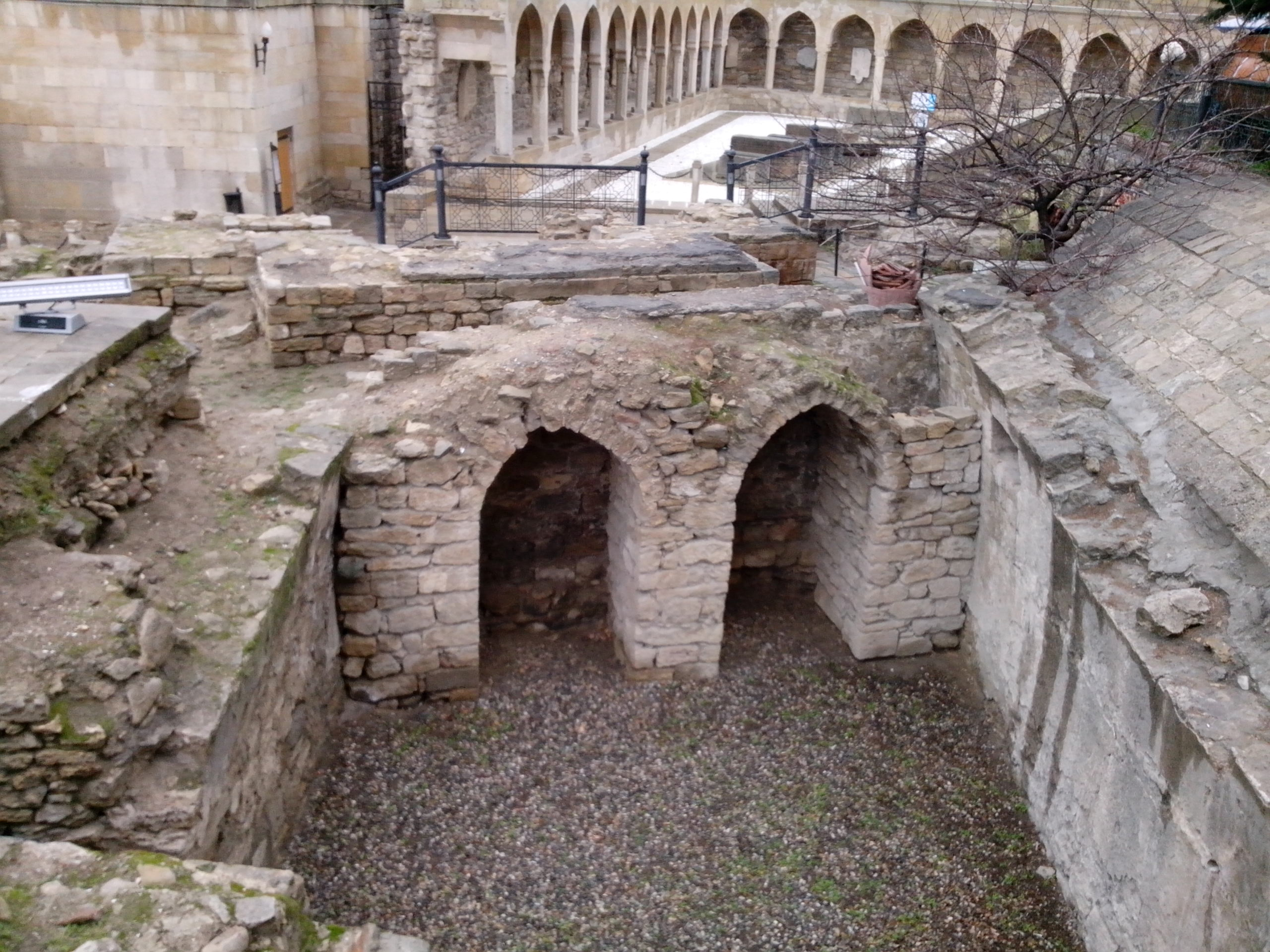

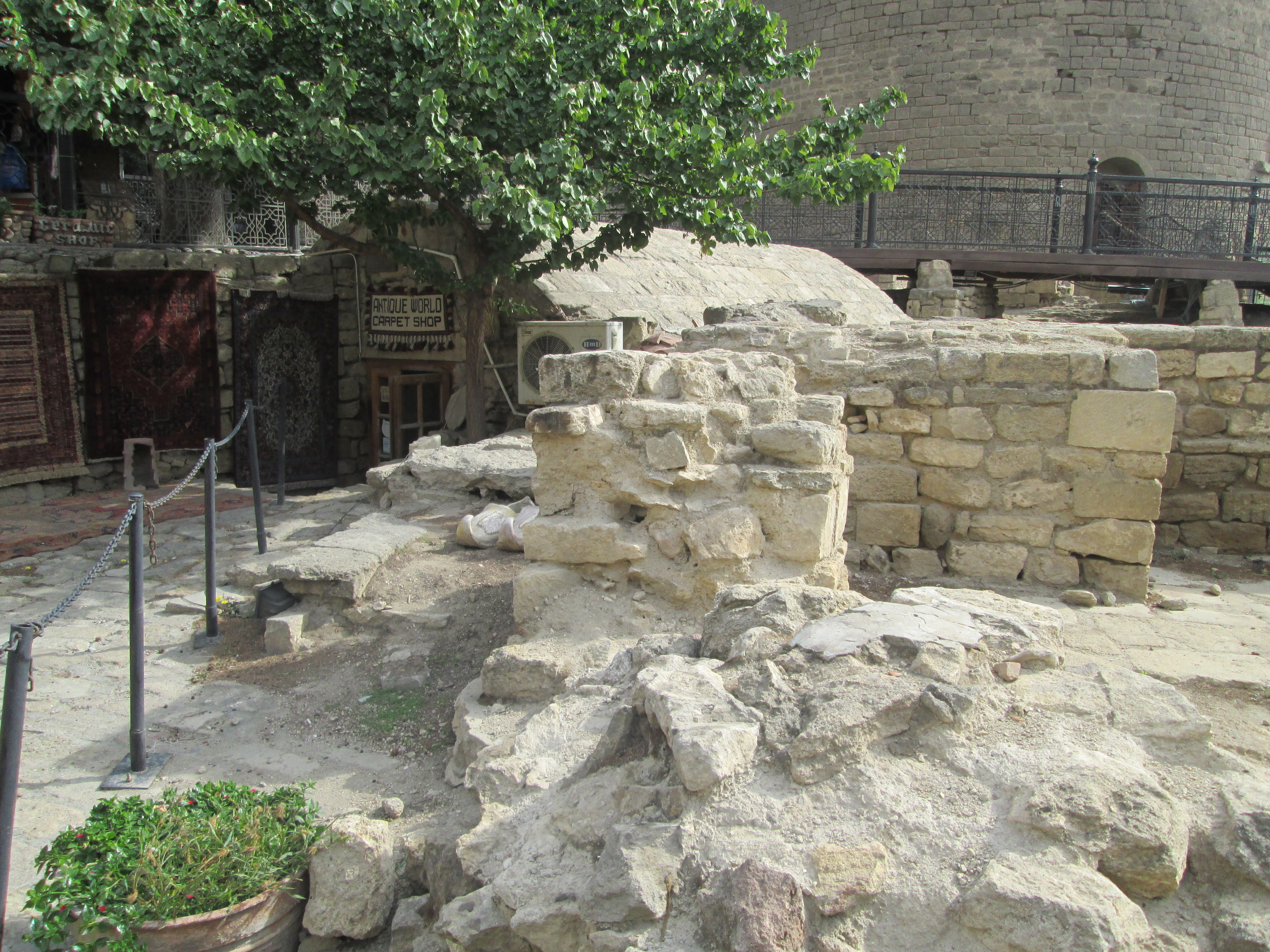

== See also ==
- Islam in Azerbaijan
- List of mosques in Azerbaijan
- List of mosques in Baku
