= Masud ibn Davud =

Masud ibn Davud was the architect, who designed the Maiden Tower in Baku, Azerbaijan in the 12th century. According to Azerbaijani historian Sara Ashurbeyli, Masud ibn Davud was probably the father of the architect of the Mardakan Round Tower.
