= List of Azerbaijani composers =

This is a list of Azerbaijani composers, alphabetically sorted by surname. It is by no means complete. It is not limited by classifications such as genre or time period—however, it includes only music composers of significant fame, notability or importance. Some further composers are included in Category of Azerbaijani composers.

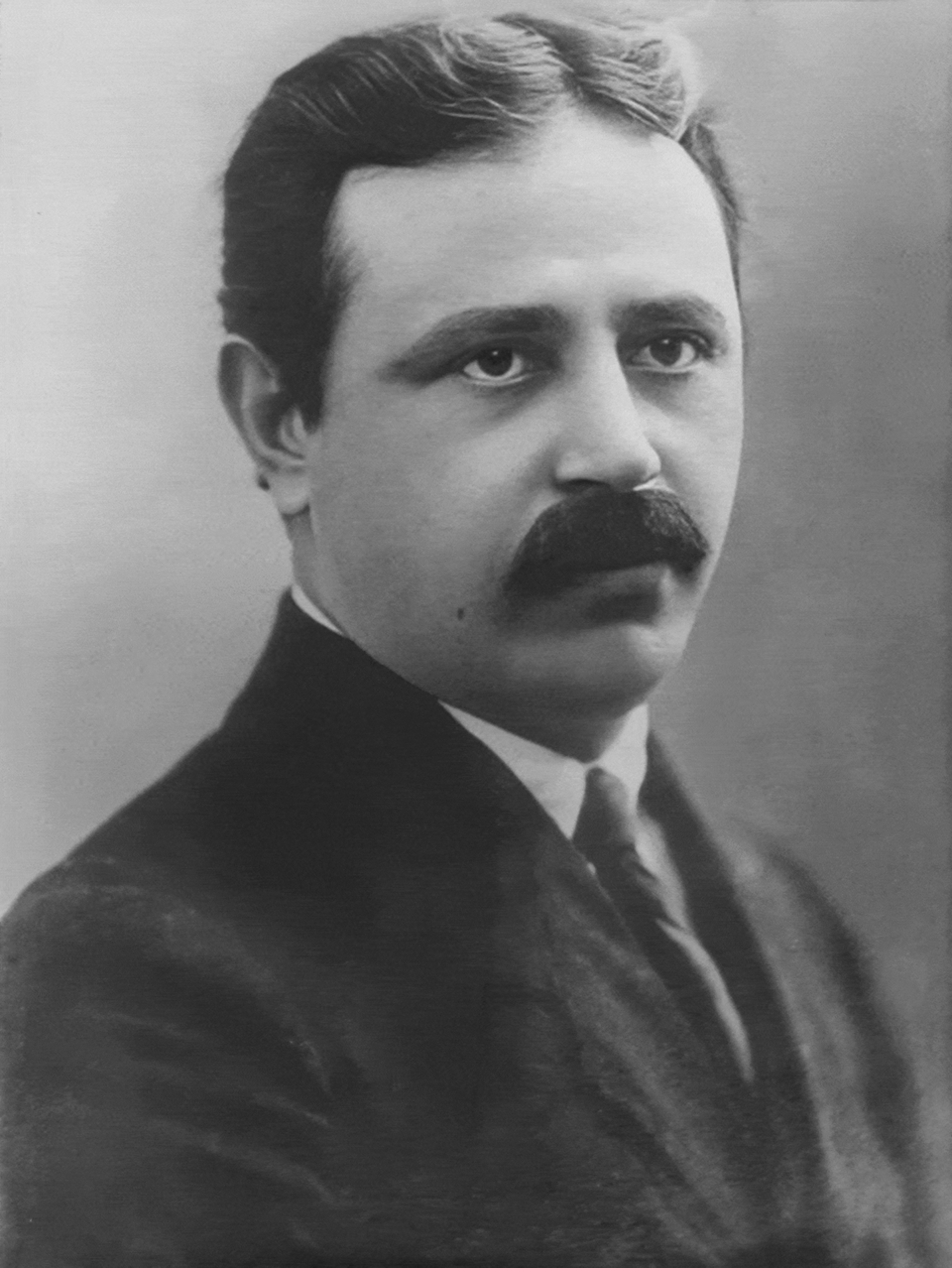
Uzeyir Hajibeyov

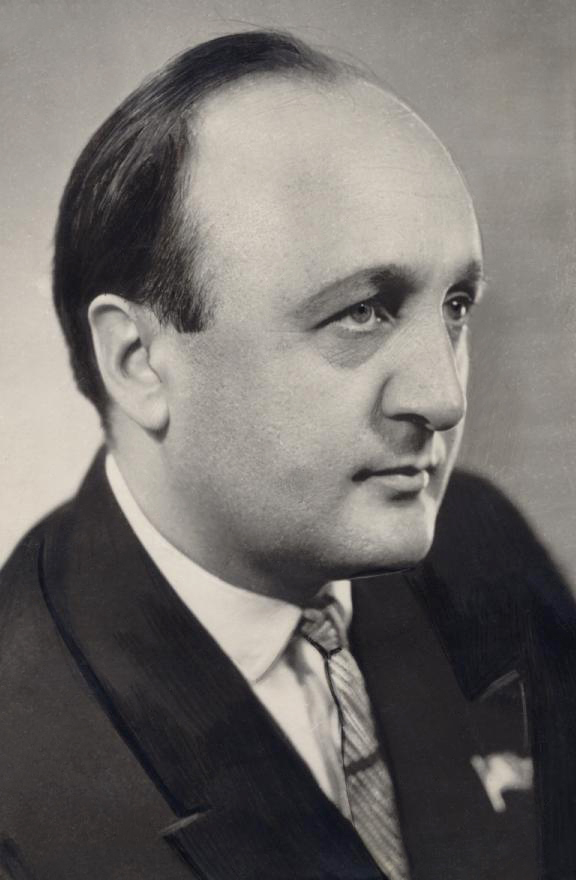
Fikret Amirov

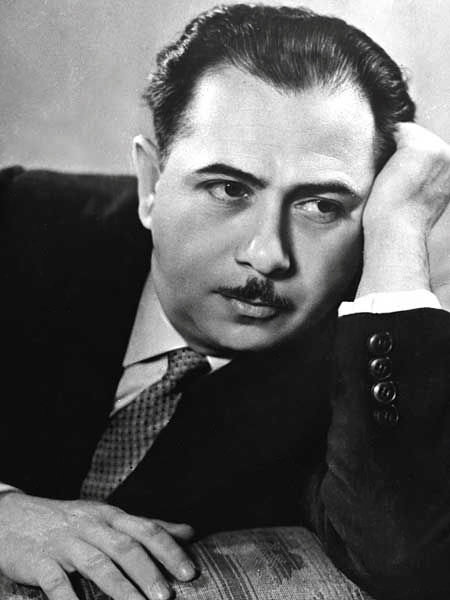
Tofig Guliyev

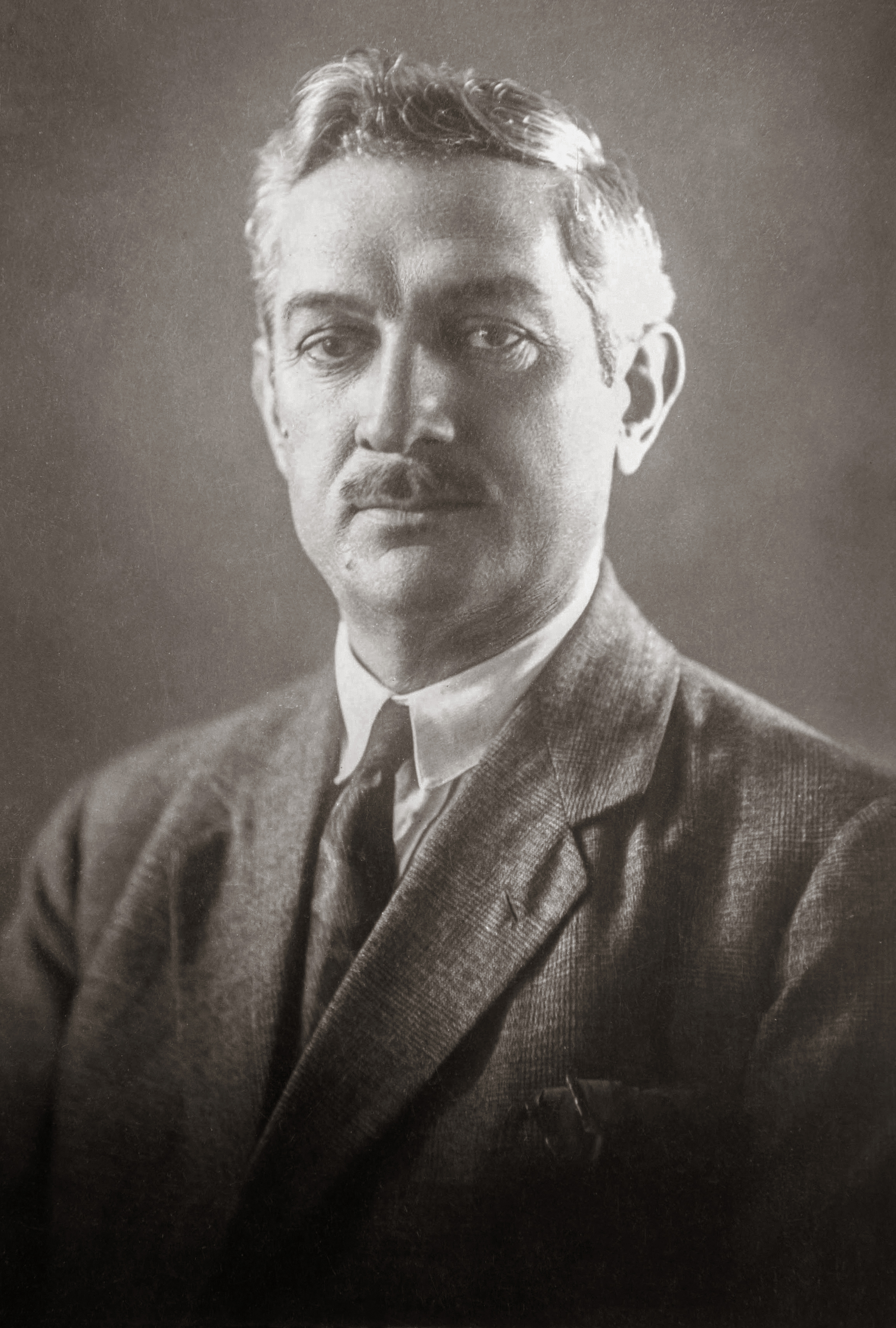
Muslim Magomaev

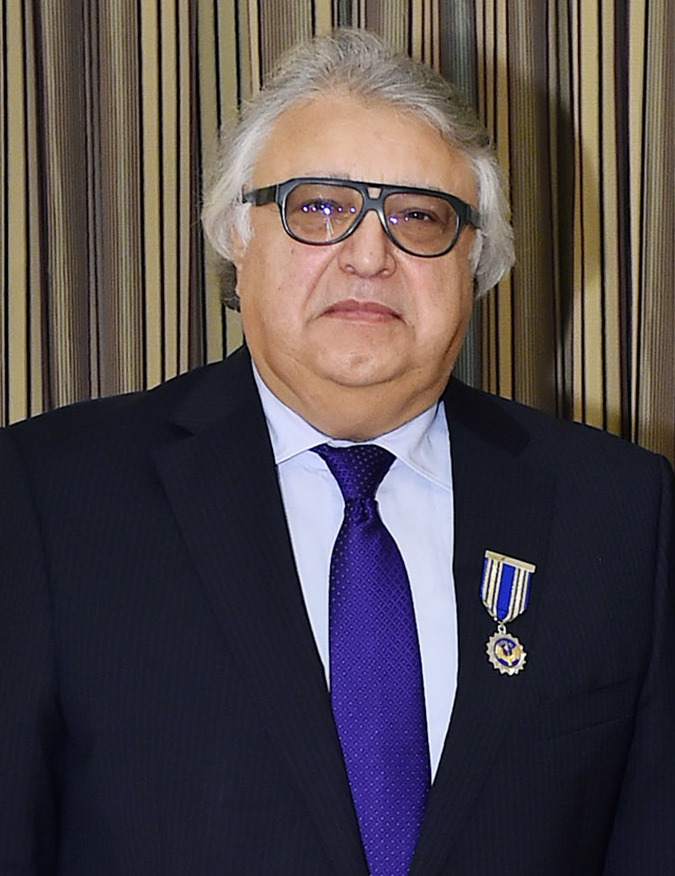
Farhad Badalbeyli

== A ==
- Franghiz Ali-Zadeh (born 1947)
- Agshin Alizadeh (1937–2014)
- Shafiga Akhundova (1924–2013)
- Vasif Adigozalov (1935–2006)
- Fikret Amirov (1922–1984)
- Mashadi Jamil Amirov (1875–1928)
- Ashraf Abbasov (1920–1992)
- Yegana Akhundova (born 1960)
- Gulara Aliyeva (1933–1991)
- Aydin Azim (born 1946)

== B ==
- Afrasiyab Badalbeyli (1907–1976)
- Farhad Badalbeyli (born 1947)
- Rafig Babayev (1937–1994)
- Polad Bülbüloğlu (born 1945)
- Tofig Bakikhanov (1930–2026)
- Zakir Baghirov (1916–1996)

== F ==
- Oleg Felzer (1939–1998)
- Amina Figarova (born 1964)

== G ==
- Gara Garayev (1918–1982)
- Tofig Guliyev (1917–2000)
- Faraj Garayev (born 1943)
- Salman Gambarov (born 1959)

== H ==
- Soltan Hajibeyov (1919–1974)
- Uzeyir Hajibeyov (1885–1948)
- Zulfugar Hajibeyov (1884–1950)
- Ismayil Hajiyev (1949–2006)
- Jovdat Hajiyev (1917–2002)
- Rauf Hajiyev (1922–1995)
- Ulviyya Hajibeyova (born 1960)

== I ==
- Elza Ibrahimova (1938–2012)

== J ==
- Jahangir Jahangirov (1921–1992)
- Afsar Javanshirov (1930–2006)

== K ==
- Haji Khanmammadov (1918–2005)

== M ==
- Alibaba Mammadov (1930–2022)
- Muslim Magomayev (1885–1937)
- Arif Malikov (1933–2019)
- Eldar Mansurov (born 1952)
- Aziza Mustafazadeh (born 1969)
- Vagif Mustafazadeh (1940–1979)
- Isa Melikov (born 1980)
- Khayyam Mirzazade (1935–2018)
- Arif Mirzayev (born 1944)
- Galib Mammadov (born 1946)
- Ramiz Mustafayev (1926–2008)
- Arif Mirzayev (born 1944)

== N ==
- Niyazi (1912–1984)

== R ==
- Said Rustamov (1907–1983)
- Aghabaji Rzayeva (1912–1975)

== S ==
- Asya Sultanova (1923–2021)
- Huseyngulu Sarabski (1879–1945)
- Emin Sabitoglu (1937–2000)
- Ali Salimi (1922–1997)
- Aygun Samedzade (born 1967)

== T ==
- Alakbar Taghiyev (1924–1981)

== U ==
- Mammadagha Umudov (born 1949)

== Z ==
- Asaf Zeynally (1909–1932)

== See also ==
- Music of Azerbaijan
- Azerbaijani classical music
- Azerbaijani opera
- Azerbaijani ballet
