= Ulviyya Hajibeyova =

Ulviyya Hajibeyova Ülviyyə Hacıbəyova
- Born: June 9, 1960 (age 65); Baku, Azerbaijan SSR, USSR
- Occupation(s): pianist, composer
- Instrument: piano
- Years active: 1983–present
- Awards: Honored Art Worker of Azerbaijan

Ulviyya Vagif gizi Hajibeyova (Azerbaijani: Ülviyyə Vaqif qızı Hacıbəyova; born June 9, 1960) is an Azerbaijani pianist and composer, Professor of Baku Music Academy, People's Artiste of Azerbaijan.

== Biography ==
Ulviyya Hajibeyova was born on June 9, 1960, in Baku. She started playing the piano at the age of 3. Ulviyya Hajibeyova received her primary education at Bulbul Secondary Music School, in the class of Y. L. Filatova. In 1983 she graduated from the Azerbaijan State Conservatory with a degree in piano, and in 1986 she graduated as an assistant trainee in the class of People's Artist of the Azerbaijan SSR Rauf Atakishiyev and she studied and practiced with professors of the Moscow Conservatory Jakob Milstein and Lev Naumov. Ulviyya Hajibeyova began her pedagogical activity in 1983 as a teacher at the Hajibeyov Azerbaijan State Conservatoire. She is currently a professor at the piano department of the Baku Music Academy.

== Career ==
Ulviyya Hajibeyova has been performing with Yegana Akhundova since 1985 as a piano duo in Azerbaijan and other countries. She has also performed successfully at a number of international festivals and competitions.

Ulviyya Hajibeyova composed her first work at the age of 6. As a result, Azerbaijan Telefilm made a film about her called "Songs of Ulviyya", which was shown on Baku and Moscow television. Ulviyya Hajibeyova edited the works of Jovdat Hajiyev, Soltan Hajibeyov, Niyazi and other composers and performed them for the first time.

Ulviya Hajibeyova is the performer of the German music disc "Dedication", "The musical world of Hajibeyovs", "Works of Azerbaijani composers found in the archives", and "Anthology of works of Azerbaijani composers" consisting of 15 discs, covering more than 1000 works of 143 Azerbaijani composers. In addition, she published a number of songs and piano works, as well as more than 30 scientific articles, and is the author of the books "Art Devotees. The world of music of Hajibeyovs", "Folk epics in the opera of Azerbaijani composers", three-volume "Performance problems of works written for piano within the project Anthology of works of Azerbaijani composers", "Ismayil Hajibeyov". In addition, she is the compiler and editor of the 3-volume "Anthology of works of Azerbaijani composers".

== Awards ==
- People's Artiste of Azerbaijan — May 27, 2018.
- Honored Art Worker of Azerbaijan — September 17, 2007.
