= Mammadagha Umudov =

Azerbaijani composer (born 1949)

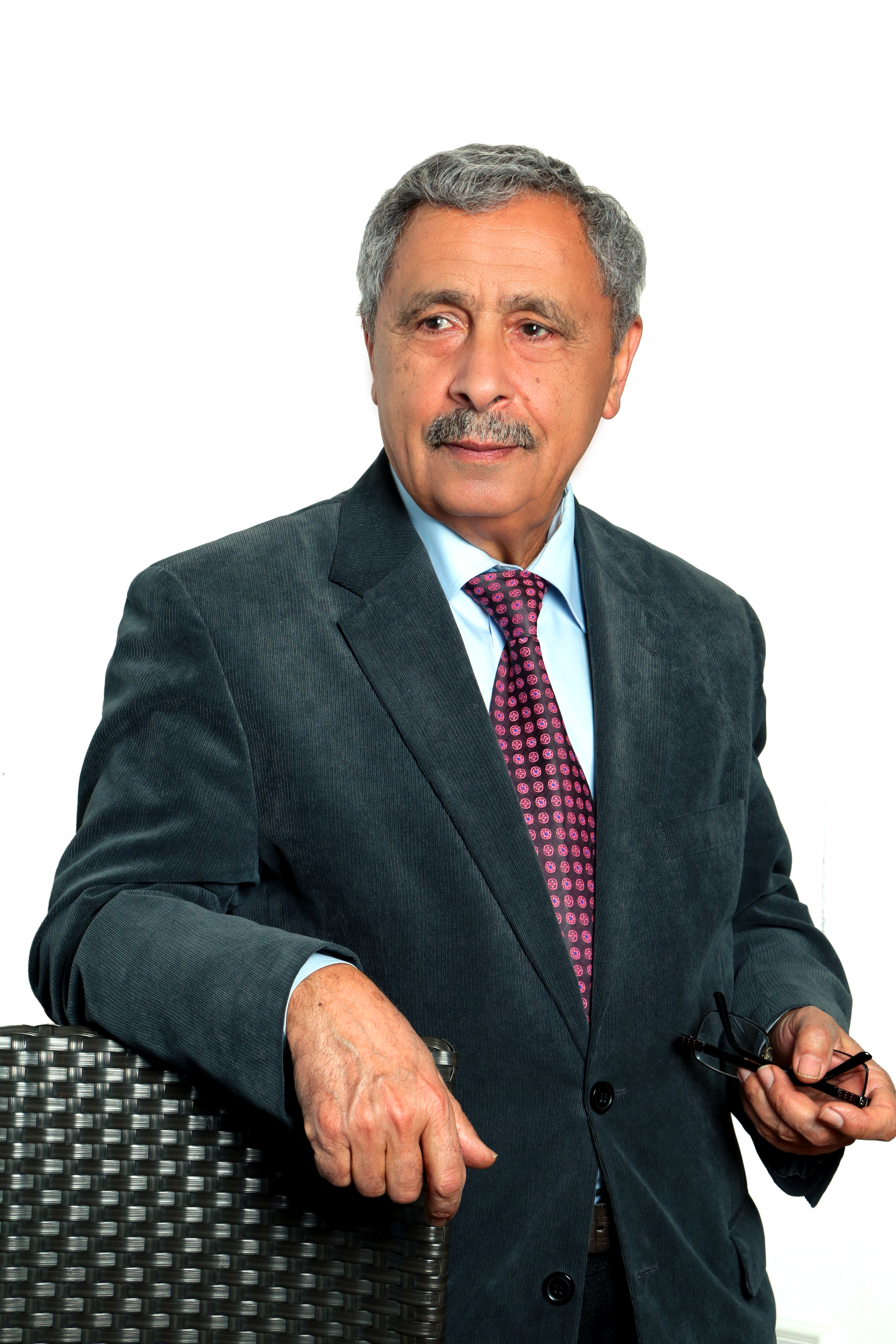

Background information
- Born: Mammadagha Mammadali oglu Umudov; May 27, 1949 (age 76)
- Origin: Əmircan, Baku, Azerbaijan SSR
- Awards

Mammadagha Mammadali oglu Umudov (Azerbaijani: Məmmədağa Məmmədəli oğlu Umudov; born May 27, 1949, Baku, Azerbaijan SSR) is an Azerbaijani musician and composer. Distinguished Artist of the Azerbaijan Republic (2007).

== Biography ==
At a young age, he was enrolled and taken by his father in a small class at a local House of Culture. Upon turning 15 years old, Mammadagha entered Baku Special Musical School named after Asaf Zeynalli. After finishing Baku Special Musical School named after Asaf Zeynalli, he was enrolled in the Department of Music Performance, majoring in the tar, at Azerbaijan State Conservatory named after Uzeyir Hajibayov. An iconic move forward to becoming a composer was made in 1973, with Umudov's admission to the 2nd year of studies at the Department of Composition at his alma mater, and started learning the fundamentals of composing music under the supervision of Jovdat Hajiyev.

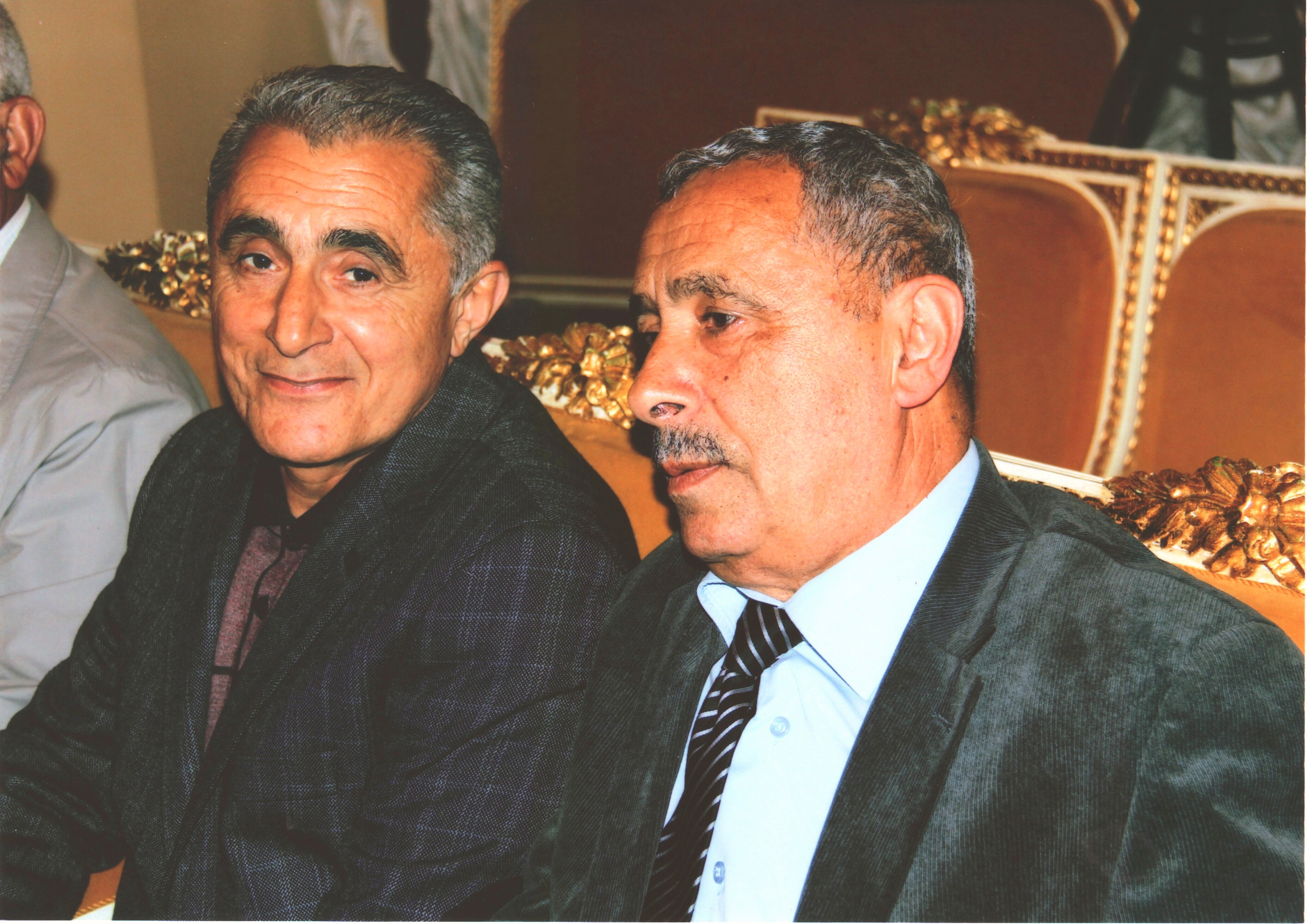
Alim Gasimov and Mammadagha Umudov

It is his idiosyncratic style that always distinguished Umudov. The composer's early works, including 12 preludes, piano trio, preludes for the piano and Sonatina, and string quartet, bore witness to how the young talent was gradually maturing, with the composition style, involving a wide variety of shades of the musical heritage of the Azerbaijani people that blended well with the 20th-century classical music. A wave of enthusiastic admiration was caused by the String Quartet that was highly acknowledged by the professional community as one of the best compositions performed during the Decade of Azerbaijani Art and Culture, in Moscow, in 1978.

Umudov's creative work during his conservatory studies culminated in his capstone project – Symphony No. 1., brought to light in 1977. The second, post-graduate period of his artistic activity got ingrained in the memory of professional musicians with a series of elaborate musical compositions. Overture Ganjlik (1980) was a clear indication of the beginning of Umudov's maturity as a composer, while Choreographic symphony (1983), Concerto for the Tar and Symphony Orchestra (1984) and the Piano trio (1987).

The Concerto, Umudov's masterpiece, is dedicated to prominent tarist Ramiz Guliyev, who was the first to perform it lively, under the guidance of conductor Ramiz Malikaslanov, at the 6th Congress of the Union of Composers of Azerbaijan Azerbaijan Soviet Socialist Republic, in 1985.

In the 1990s, Umudov's creative live went through a ‘reset’ stage: the composer had to examine himself and re-establish his sense of self-worth following a series of emotional, cultural, and other shocks he had to live through, including the Black January Tragedy, independence of Azerbaijan regained from the Soviet Union, Nagorno-Karabakh war, and a deep sociopolitical and a steep economic crisis in a newly independent country. Having preserved individual features identifying his musical traits, Umudov composed the Sonata for Solo Violin in 1992.

Symphony No. 3 for string orchestra Düşüncələr (reflections) came into being as the first monumental musical composition of Umudov in the 21st century. Later symphonic poem Gobustan (2012), the Concerto for Violin and Symphony Orchestra (2014), and the ballet suite (2014), added the flavor of scenic beauty to artistic programmes of momentous cultural events at the national level. In 2014, he completed yet another major work, symphonic mugham Chahargah. Symphonic mugham, a genre of classical Azerbaijani music. The distinctive feature of Umudov's Chahargah is the vocal and instrumental arrangement of mugham composition, as well as diverse orchestration. Solo parts performed by mugham masters, accompanied by the tar, balaban, and zurna, form the ‘coiled whole’ with recited lyric inclusions from Mugham poem.

Chahargah preceded several patriotic musical pieces — two marches To Victory and march Republic for choir and piano. The latter composition, dedicated to the 100th anniversary of the founding of the Azerbaijan Democratic Republic.

== Personal life ==
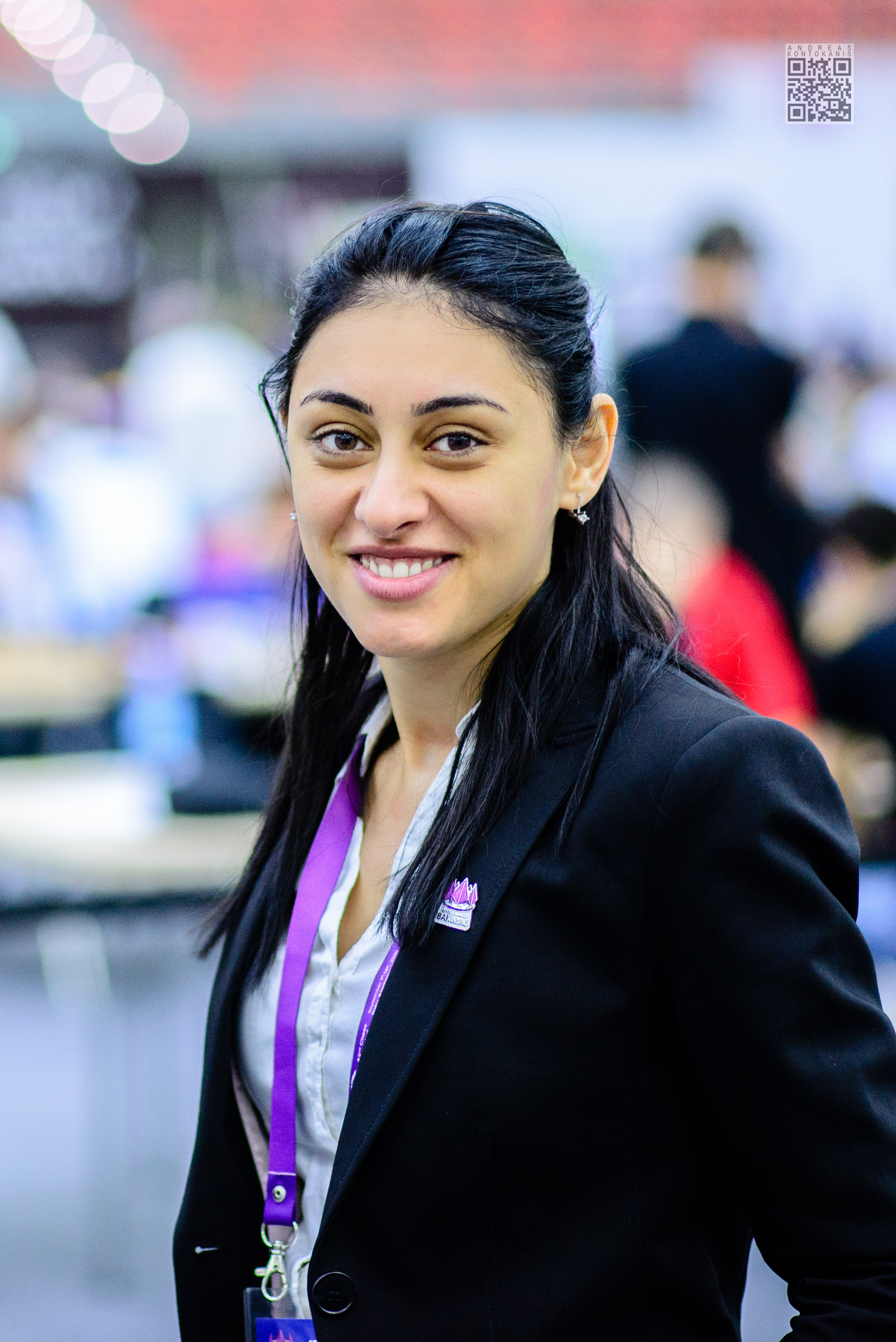
Ulkar Umudova

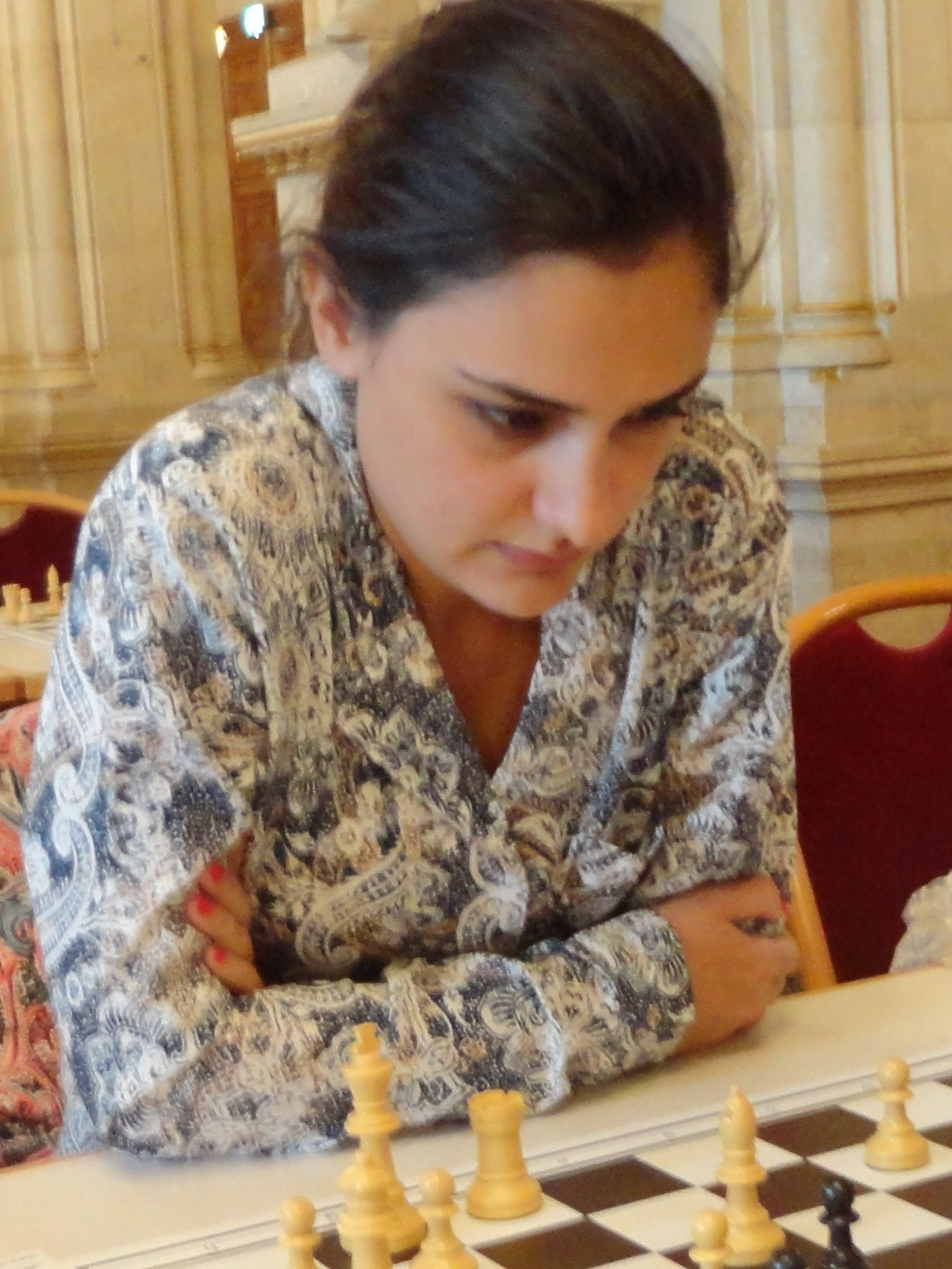
Nargiz Umudova

The compositional, pedagogic, and public activity of Umudov builds on strong family representation and support. He derived creational inspiration from four women, his spouse and three daughters. The elder daughter, Ulkar, made her contribution to the family name upon becoming the first female Azerbaijani International Arbiter, the highest title attained through FIDE. The youngest daughter, Nargiz, is a Woman Grandmaster and a silver medalist of the World Junior Chess Championship in 2006. She was a member of the Azerbaijan Women's National Chess Team between 2006 and 2016.

== Pedagogic activity ==
Mammadagha Umudov embarked on his teaching career at Baku College of Librarianship in 1968. Nine years later, in 1977, he undertook an assignment at Baku Special Musical School named after Asaf Zeynalli that later gained recognition as an institution forging a bright constellation of national professional musicians. Meanwhile, from 1978 through 1988, Umudov professed music at Azerbaijan State Conservatory named after Uzeyir Hajibayov, a leading musical institution in the country. Having devoted 28 years to Baku Special Musical School and carved out a name for himself in teaching, he received an offer to teach at the Azerbaijan National Conservatory, where he has worked ever since and risen in his colleagues’ esteem.

The subject he is teaching – organology – constitutes an integral part of creating musical pieces. Furthermore, the professor is the author of the textbook Organology, while the manual Recommendations, also authored by Mammadagha Umudov, contains a concise account of Organology, thereby becoming a handbook for many music teachers.

== Musical compositions performed/played and published ==
- 12 preludes, Piano Trio, 1973–75.
- String Quartet, 1975. The composition was first played at the Decade of Azerbaijani Art and Culture in Moscow, 1978.
- Preludes for the piano and Sonatina, 1974–75.
- Symphony No. 1, 1977. The composition was first performed on the state-controlled television channel AzTV in 1978, with Ramiz Malikaslanov directing the performance as a conductor.
- Overture Ganjlik (youth), 1980. The composition was first performed on AzTV, with Ali Javanshir directing the performance as a conductor.
- Concerto for the Tar and Symphony Orchestra, 1984. The composition was first performed by tarist Ramiz Guliyev at the 6th Congress of the Union of Composers of Azerbaijan Soviet Socialist Republic in 1985, with Ramiz Malikaslanov directing the performance as a conductor.
- Choreographic Symphony (Symphony No. 2), 1983.
- Piano Trio, 1987.
- Sonata for Solo Violin, 1992. The composition was first performed by Prof. Sarvar Ganiyev, People's Artist of the Azerbaijan Soviet Socialist Republic, in the Azerbaijan State Academic Philharmonic named after Muslim Magomayev, in 1985.
- Symphony No. 3 for string orchestra Düşüncələr (reflections), 2005. The inaugural performance was conducted by Teymur Goychayev, People's Artist of Azerbaijan and chief conductor of the State Chamber Orchestra of Azerbaijan, in the Concert Hall of Chamber and Organ Music, at the 8th Congress of the Union of Composers of Azerbaijan in 2007.
- Concerto for the Tar and Symphony Orchestra, 1984. The composition was performed by tarist Sahib Pashazada in the Azerbaijan State Academic Philharmonic named after Muslim Magomayev, at II International Festival World of Mugham, in 2011, with Fakhraddin Karimov directing the performance as a conductor.
- Symphonic poem Gobustan, 2012. The inaugural performance was conducted by Prof. Azad Aliyev, Distinguished Artist of Azerbaijan and chief conductor of the Symphony Orchestra named after Niyazi under Azerbaijan TV and Radio Company, in the Grand Hall of Baku Musical Academy named after Uzeyir Hajibayov, at the 9th Congress of the Union of Composers of Azerbaijan in 2012.
- Concerto for Violin and Symphony Orchestra, 2014. The composition was first performed by violinist Jamila Qarayusifli, a Presidential scholarship holder who studied in Switzerland, with maestro Rauf Abdullayev, People's Artist of the Azerbaijan Soviet Socialist Republic, directing the performance as a conductor.
- Ballet Suite, 2014. The inaugural performance was conducted by Eyyub Guliyev, at the concert dedicated to the 80th anniversary of the Union of Composers of Azerbaijan, in the Azerbaijan State Academic Philharmonic named after Muslim Magomayev.
- Concert Piece, 2015. The inaugural performance was conducted by Teymur Goychayev, People's Artist of Azerbaijan and chief conductor of the State Chamber Orchestra of Azerbaijan, in the Concert Hall of Chamber and Organ Music.
- Symphonic mugham Chahargah, 2014. The composition was performed with a vocal accompaniment involving excerpts from the poem Mugham written by Bakhtiyar Vahabzada, People's Poet and Distinguished Artist of the Azerbaijan SSR.
- Two marches To Victory. Ekoprint, Baku, 2015.
- Seven piano pieces and two marches. Ekoprint, Baku, 2017, 64 pages.
- Nine preludes for piano. Ekoprint, Baku, 2018, 48 pages.
- March Republic for choir and piano, with lyrics written by Vugar Ahmad. Ekoprint, Baku, 2018, 30 pages.
- Concerto for Violin and Symphony Orchestra. Clavier. Ekoprint, Baku, 2018, 56 pages.

== Study programmes, methodological guides, manuals and textbooks ==
- “Tar ilə simfonik orkestr üçün Konsert”in ifa xüsusiyyətləri. Metodik tövsiyə. Bakı, 2009 (Performance idiosyncrasies related to the Concerto for the Tar and Symphony Orchestra. Methodological guide. Baku, 2009).
- “Tar ilə simfonik oskestr üçün işlənmiş konsert” (klavir). Dərs vəsaiti. Bakı, 2010 (Transposition of the Concerto for the Tar and Symphony Orchestra. Manual. Baku, 2010).
- “Musiqi əsərlərinin Azərbaycan Xalq Çalğı alət¬lərinin simfonik orkestrləşdirilməsi”. Metodik tövsiyə. Bakı, 2013 (Symphonic orchestration of national musical instruments for musical compositions. Methodological guide. Baku, 2013).
- Milli Konservatoriya üçün çoxlu sayda proq¬ramlar. 2010-cu il (Study programmes for the Azerbaijan National Conservatory, 2010).
- Kamança və fortepiano üçün işlənmiş konsert. Bakı, 2014-cü il (Concerto transposition for the kamancha and piano. Baku, 2014).
- “Alətşünaslıq”. Dərslik. Bakı, 2015 (Organology. Textbook. Baku, 2015).
- “Simfonik Orkestr Alətlərinin Orkestrləşdi¬rilməsi” fənni bakalavr dərəcəsi alan tələbələr üçün proqram. Bakı, 2016, 15 səh (Study programme for undergraduate students studying the subject Orchestration of symphony orchestra instruments. Baku, 2016. 15 pages).
- “Simfonik Orkestr Alətləri və Orkestr” fənni magistr dərəcəsi alan tələbələr üçün proqram. Bakı, 2016, 15 səh (Study programme for master's degree students studying the subjects Symphony orchestra instruments and orchestra. Baku, 2016. 15 pages).
- “Alətşünaslıq”. Dirijorluq kafedrasının dirijor¬luq ixtisasında bakalavr dərəcəsi alan tələbələr üçün proqram. Bakı 2016, 19 səh (Organology. Study programme for undergraduate students majoring in the art of conducting at the Department of Conducting. Baku, 2016, 19 pages)
- “Alətşünaslıq”. Dirijorluq kafedrasının bəstə¬karlıq ixtisasında bakalavr dərəcəsi alan tələbələr üçün proqram. Bakı, 2016, 19 səh (Organology. Study programme for undergraduate students majoring in the art and craft of musical composition at the Department of Conducting. Baku, 2016, 19 pages).
- Qələbəyə doğru “İki marş”. Metodik vəsait. Bakı, 2017, 56 səh (Two marches To Victory. Handbook. Baku, 2017, 56 pages).
