= Naz elama (dance) =

National Azerbaijani dance

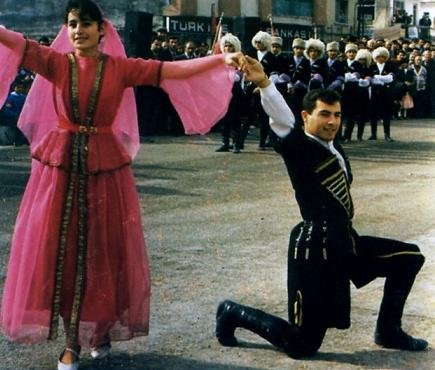
Performance of the dance in Iğdır. July, 2005.

Naz elama (Azerbaijani: Naz eləmə) – is a national Azerbaijani dance, performed by a couple of man and woman. In translation from Azerbaijani, it means “Don’t be capricious”, which is reflected in the dance itself, which demands a special expressiveness, refinement and impetuosity.

The dance became popular in performance of artists such as Amina Dilbazi. “Naz elama” was considered the crowning number of the dancer. The dancer said that: “”Naz elama” is the crowning dance, which I travelled all over the world with.” In a musical film called “The labour and rose”, shot by Tofig Taghizade and dedicated to Makhmud Esambayev, the People’s Artist of the USSR, the actor performs this dance together with Amina Dilbazi.

In 1989, Shafiga Hanifayeva and Kamil Dadashov performed this dance in Czechoslovakia.
