= Azerbaijan State Symphony Orchestra =

Hajibeyov Azerbaijan State Symphony Orchestra
- Orchestra
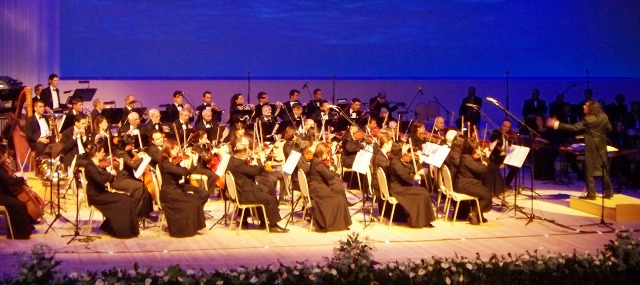
- Performing at the Mugham Festival, 2009
- Founded: 1920
- Location: Baku, Azerbaijan
- Website: www.mugam.az

The Hajibeyov Azerbaijan State Symphony Orchestra (Azeri: Hacıbəyov adına Azərbaycan Dövlət Simfonik Orkestri) was formed in 1920 being one of the first orchestras in the Soviet Union, at the request of composer Uzeyir Hajibeyov after whom it was later named. It is affiliated with the Azerbaijan State Philharmonic Society.

Composers such as Rhené-Baton and Otto Klemperer were invited from abroad to assist in establishing and training the orchestra body. From 1938 to 1984, Hajibeyov's nephew Niyazi was conducting the orchestra. After his death, the conducting has been performed by People's Artist of Azerbaijan, Professor Rauf Abdullayev. The orchestra has toured a number of countries including the United States, the United Kingdom, France, Germany, Switzerland, Italy, Turkey, and Egypt.

== Principal conductors ==
- Uzeyir Hajibeyov (1920–1938)
- Niyazi Hajibeyov (1938–1984)
- Rauf Abdullayev (1984–1991; 1998–2023)
- Yalchin Adigezalov (1991–1998)
- Fuad Ibrahimov (2023)
