= Sarvar Ibrahimov =

Sarvar Ibrahimov Sərvər İbrahimov
- Born: 13 February 1930; Shusha, NKAO, Azerbaijan SSR, TSFSR, USSR
- Died: 7 May 2002 (aged 72) Baku, Azerbaijan
- Occupations: musician, pedagogue
- Instrument: tar
- Years active: 1946–2002
- Awards: Honored Artist of the Republic of Azerbaijan

Sarvar Rza oghlu Ibrahimov (Azerbaijani: Sərvər Rza oğlu İbrahimov, 13 February 1930 – 7 May 2002) was an Azerbaijani tar player, Honored Artist of the Republic of Azerbaijan (2000).

== Biography ==
Sarvar Rza oglu Ibrahimov was born on 13 February 1930 in the city of Shusha. In 1944–1950, he studied at the Azerbaijan State Music School. He took lessons from Ahmad Bakikhanov and Mirza Mansur.

Sarvar Ibrahimov was the soloist of the Azerbaijan State Academic Philharmonic Hall in 1946–1955, and the Azerbaijan State Song and Dance Ensemble in 1955–1964. In 1978–1988, he worked in "Azkonsert" Tour-Concert Union. He accompanied many singers, including Khan Shushinski.

From 1985 to 2002, Sarvar Ibrahimov worked as a teacher at the Bulbul Secondary Music School. On 28 October 2000, he was awarded the honorary title "Honored Artist of the Republic of Azerbaijan".

Sarvar Ibrahimov died on 7 May 2002 in Baku.
