= Asaf Zeynally =

Azerbaijani composer

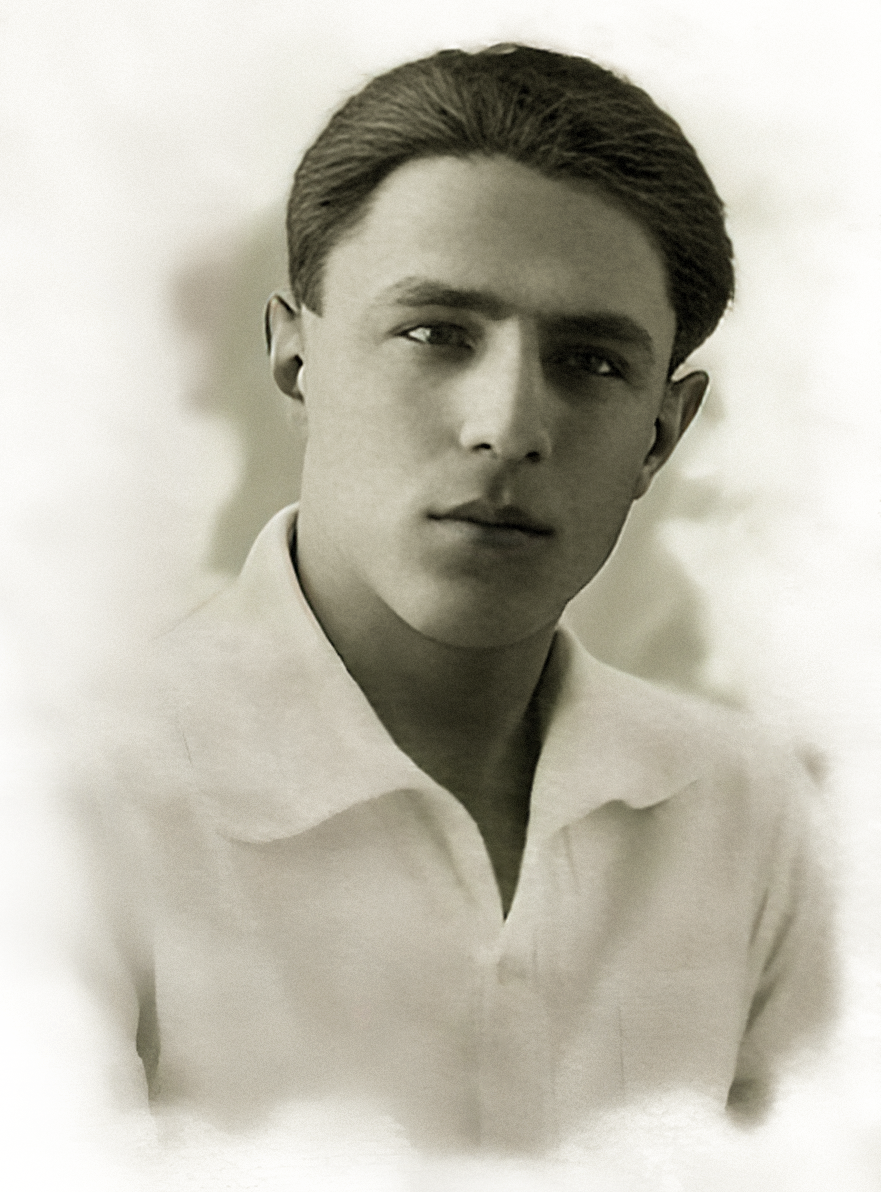
Asaf Zeynally

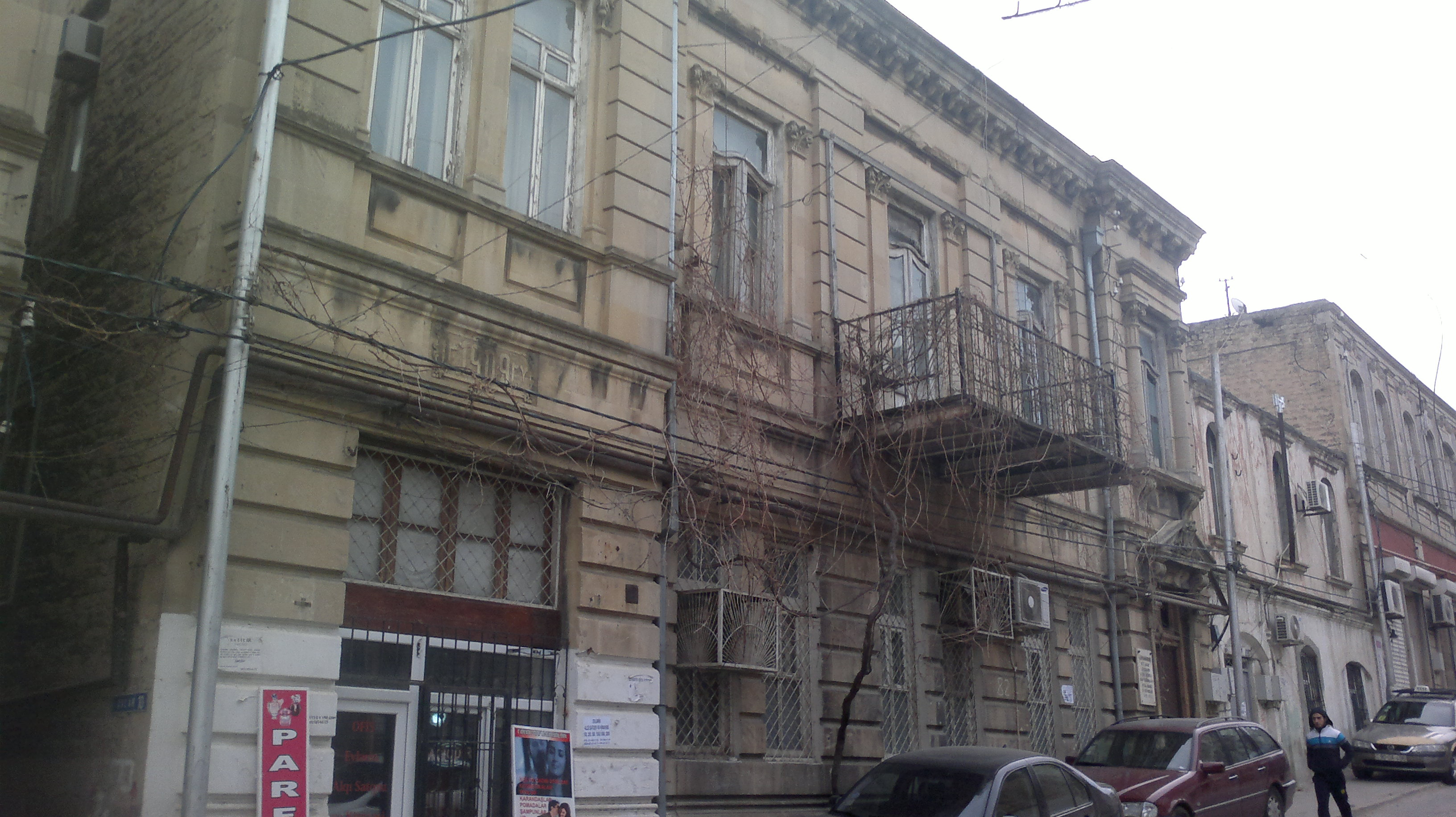
House in Baku, where Asaf Zeynally lived

Asaf Zeynalabdin oglu Zeynally (Azerbaijani: Asəf Zeynallı), also spelled Zeynalli (5 April 1909, Derbent – 27 October 1932, Baku), was an Azerbaijani composer.

== Early life ==
Asaf Zeynally was the third child of the gardener Zeynalabdin and his wife Asband. He grew up in a house located next to Derbent's famous historical Naryn-Kala sight. Asaf Zeynally's father died shortly after his birth, and his mother, Asband, a weaver, became the family's breadwinner. She was also an amateur musician and singer, and she played the accordion contributing to her younger son's growing passion for music. In 1916, 7-year-old Zeynally started attending the Derbent Realschule, a local primary school, where he became a member of the school choir and was taught to play the clarinet often participating in public performances of an amateur brass band outside school. In 1920, the family moved to Baku, Azerbaijan, where Zeynally continued his education at a military school, at which he also learned to play the trumpet.

== Contributions ==
In 1923, Zeynally enrolled in the newly established musical college (which would be later named after him) where he was taught by prominent composer Uzeyir Hajibeyov. While studying at the college, he composed his first work entitled Mahni ("The Song") and performed it on a trumpet. The performance was perceived at revolutionary by music experts as the young composer managed to adjust the ceremonial march-like tune of the instrument in order to play folk Azeri music. Encouraged by Hajibeyov, Zeynally enrolled in the composer program at the Azerbaijan State Conservatoire upon graduating from the musical college in 1926. Along with writing music, Zeynally publishes articles on Azeri musical culture, in which he mainly develops Hajibeyov's method of merging traditional Azeri styles with Western European classical music. In the early 1930s, he was among members of intelligentsia who opposed the goal of the Soviets to ban tar. Since 1928 Zeynally taught at the music school by the Conservatoire, where he teaches theories of music (Gara Garayev, Jovdat Hajiyev and Tofig Guliyev were among his students). 1929 becomes the peak of the composer's activity. Among his works produced that year, there was the romance Olkam ("My Country"), children's suite, Garabagh shikastasi for a symphonic orchestra, and other folk songs adjusted for Western instruments. In 1931 graduated from the Conservatoire and was appointed head of the Department of Music of the Baku Turkic Labour Theatre. There, his main contribution was writing music for the controversial propaganda play Sevil. In 1932, the theatre successfully toured Saint Petersburg.

Asaf Zeynally died in 1932, at the age of 23, of an illness, never getting to compose the monumental symphony dedicated to Baku that he had planned earlier.

The Asaf Zeynally Music School in Baku currently bears his name.
