= Musa Mirzayev =

Musa Mirzayev Musa Mirzəyev
- Born: January 26, 1933; Baku, Azerbaijan SSR, TSFSR, USSR
- Died: January 29, 2016 (aged 83); Baku, Azerbaijan
- Genres: symphonic metal, chamber music
- Occupation: composer
- Years active: 1958–2016
- Burial place: II Alley of Honor
- Education: Hajibeyov Azerbaijan State Conservatoire
- Awards

Musa Abdulla oghlu Mirzayev (Azerbaijani: Musa Abdulla oğlu Mirzəyev, January 26, 1933 — January 29, 2016) was the People's Artiste of Azerbaijan (2005), member of the Board of Directors of the Composers Union of Azerbaijan, professor of the Baku Music Academy, presidential scholarship holder, laureate of the "Sharaf Order" and "Shohrat Order".

== Biography ==
Musa Mirzayev was born on January 26, 1933, in Baku. In 1947–1951, he studied at the Asaf Zeynalli Baku Music College, and in 1952–1958, he studied composition at the Hajibeyov Azerbaijan State Conservatoire in the class of Gara Garayev.

Musa Mirzayev, who started his career in the Azerbaijan State Radio and Television Broadcasting Committee as a concertmaster of the youth choir in 1958, worked there until 1978, and in 1978-1979 he held the position of artistic director of the Azerbaijan State Philharmonic. In the following period, Musa Mirzayev, who was only engaged in creativity and created compositional works, worked in various positions in "Shur" music publishing house in 1992–1993. At the invitation of Farhad Badalbeyli, he began teaching at the Baku Music Academy from 1992 until the end of his life.

Musa Mirzayev died of a stroke on January 29, 2016, in Baku.

== Awards ==
- People's Artiste of Azerbaijan — September 16, 2005
- Honored Art Worker of the Azerbaijan SSR — 1982
- Sharaf Order — January 31, 2013
- Shohrat Order — January 25, 2003
