= House-Museum of Niyazi =

- Azerbaijani: Niyazinin ev-muzeyi
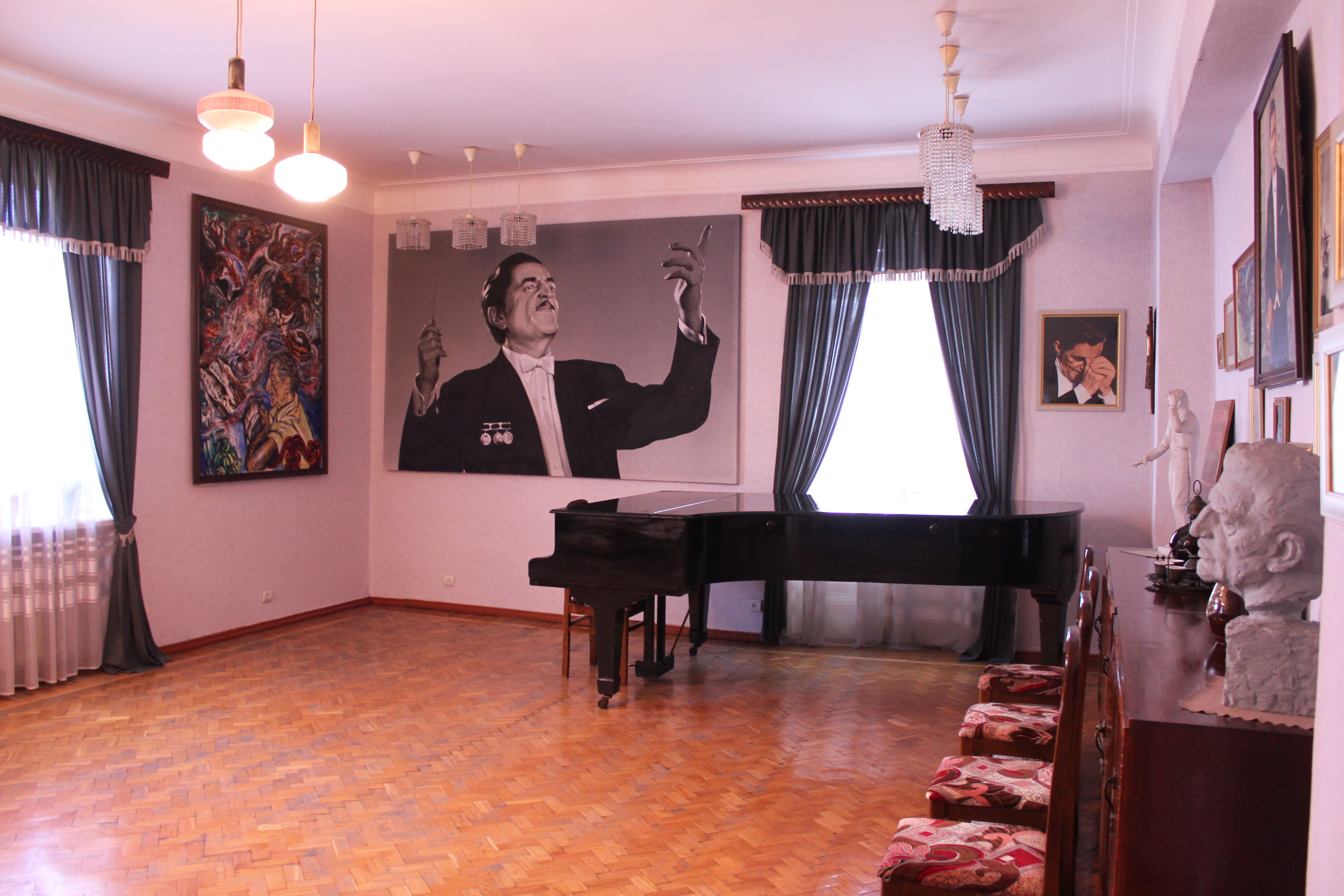

- Location within Azerbaijan
- Established: September 18, 1994; 31 years ago
- Location: Bulbul avenue, 29, Baku, Azerbaijan
- Coordinates: 40.374841°N 49.843003°E
- Director: Rza Bayramov
- Website: musicmuseum.az

The house-museum of Niyazi (Azerbaijani: Niyazinin ev-muzeyi) is a memorial museum dedicated to the Azerbaijani conductor and composer, People's Artist of the USSR, Niyazi. It is located in the capital of Azerbaijan, the city of Baku, Bulbul avenue. The museum is a branch of the Azerbaijan State Museum of Musical Culture.

== History ==
Maestro Niyazi lived and worked in this apartment from 1958 until the end of his life. The House-Museum of Niyazi was established by order of the Ministry of Culture of Azerbaijan on December 28, 1990. The museum was inaugurated on September 18, 1994. The director of the museum is Bayramov Rza Rafig oglu.

The House-Museum of Niyazi regularly organizes various events dedicated to musical life of the Republic: memorable evenings, conferences and concerts.

== Exposition ==
The apartment house consists of 5 rooms: 3 of them (dining-room, bedroom and work room) are memorial rooms. They are preserved as they were during the time of Niyazi. The other 2 rooms are used for the exposition and artistic guest room. In the exposition room photographs, notes, posters, programs, etc. are exhibited. Those reflect life and creativity of Niyazi from his childhood until the end of his life. In the living room there are photos reflecting Niyazi's public activity, paintings donated to Maestro and obtained by the museum in various years.

Niyazi's office is the center of his creative work. Particular attention is paid to the central wall, hung with photographs by Niyazi himself. On the wall there are photos of famous artists of Azerbaijan and famous musicians of the world.

In the bedroom personal items, furniture, which give an opportunity to get an idea of the taste of the owner and the fashion for clothing and interior in 60-80s in the Soviet Union are exhibited.

At the museum currently are exhibited:

- Niyazi Museum currently: 120 Niyazi's note manuscripts;
- 2746 photos;
- 486 books and notes in Niyazi's personal library;
- 279 vinyl records;
- 5 manuscripts of other composers

== Gallery ==
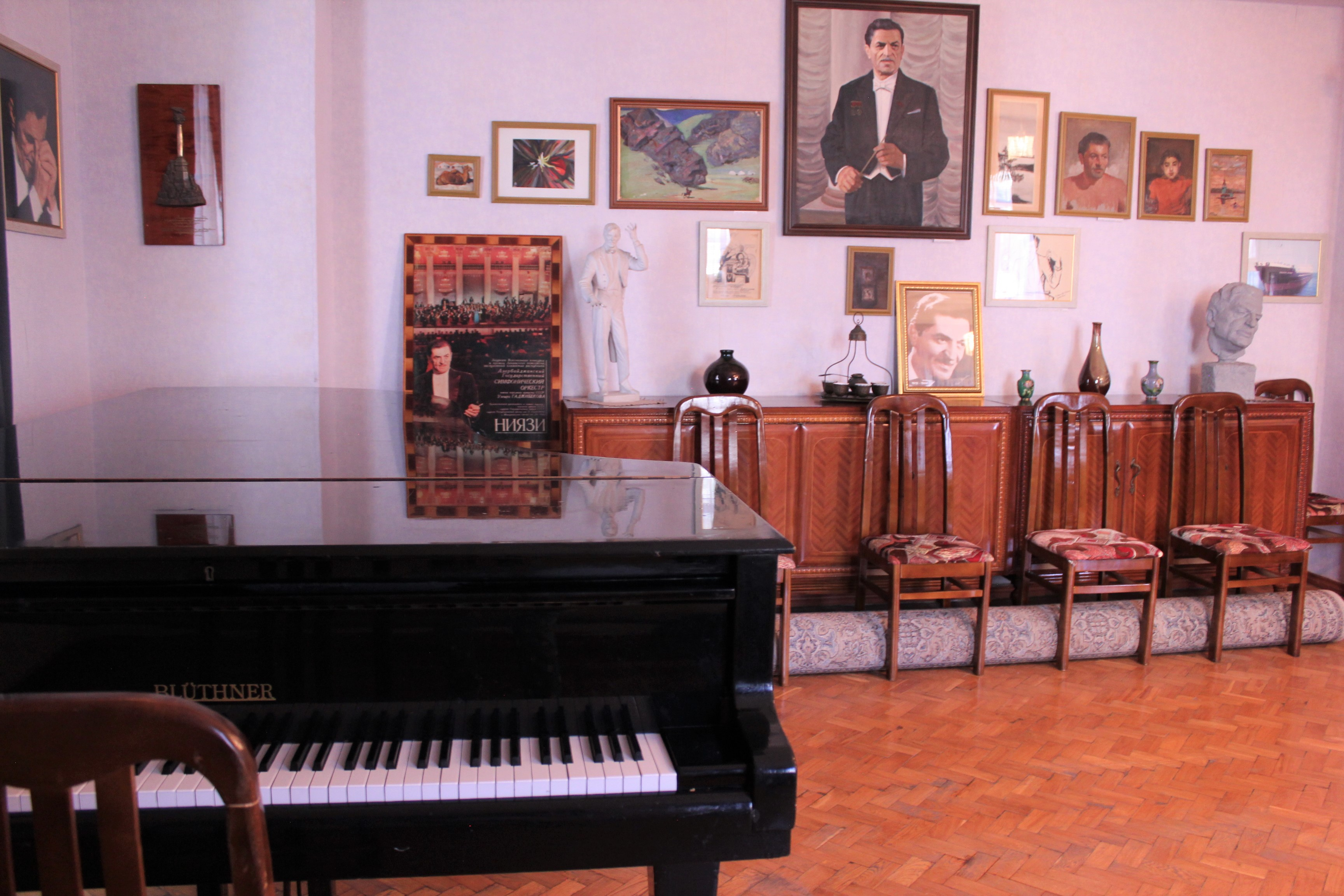
Interior of guest room

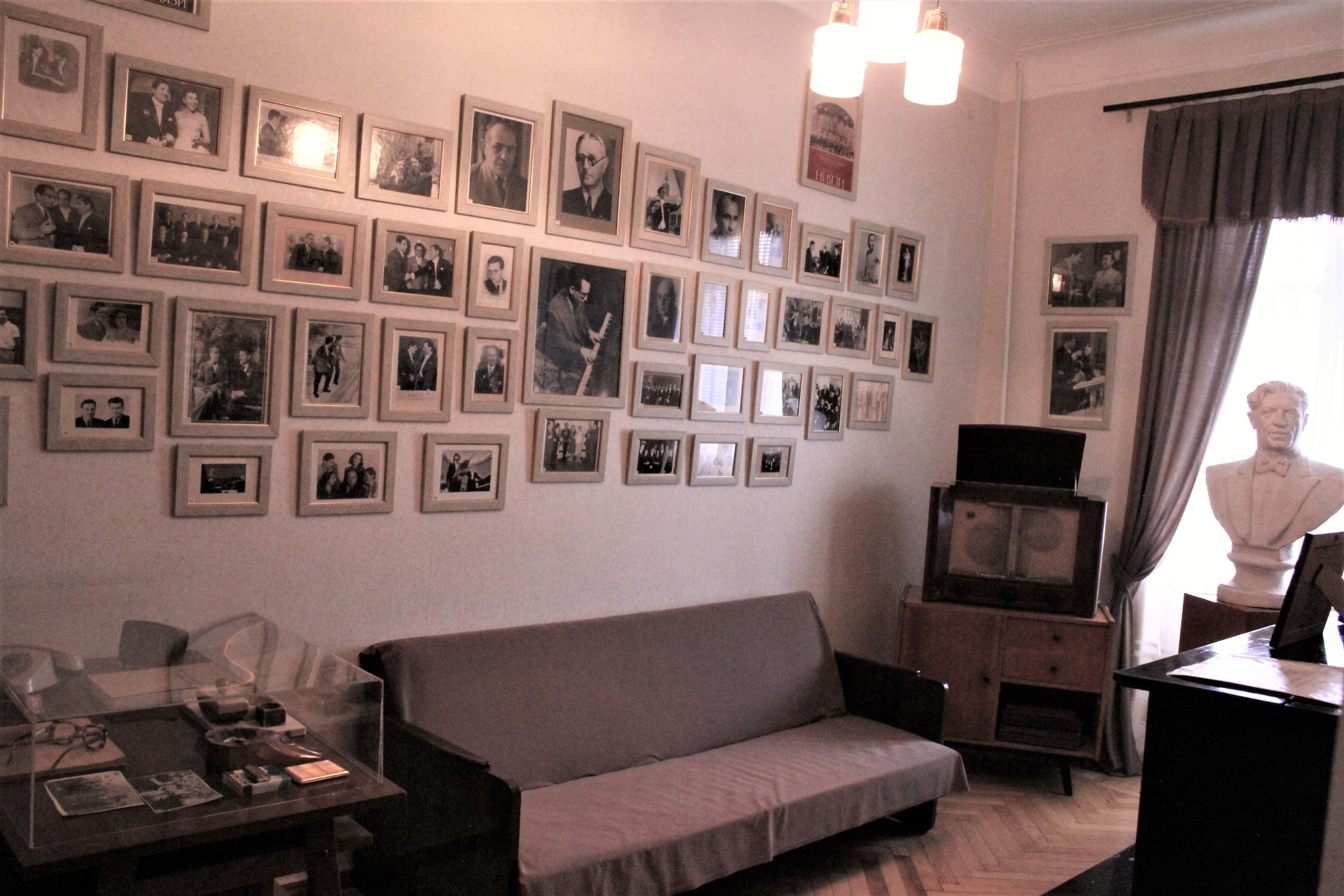
Interior cabinet. On the wall are photos of famous artists of Azerbaijan and famous musicians of the world

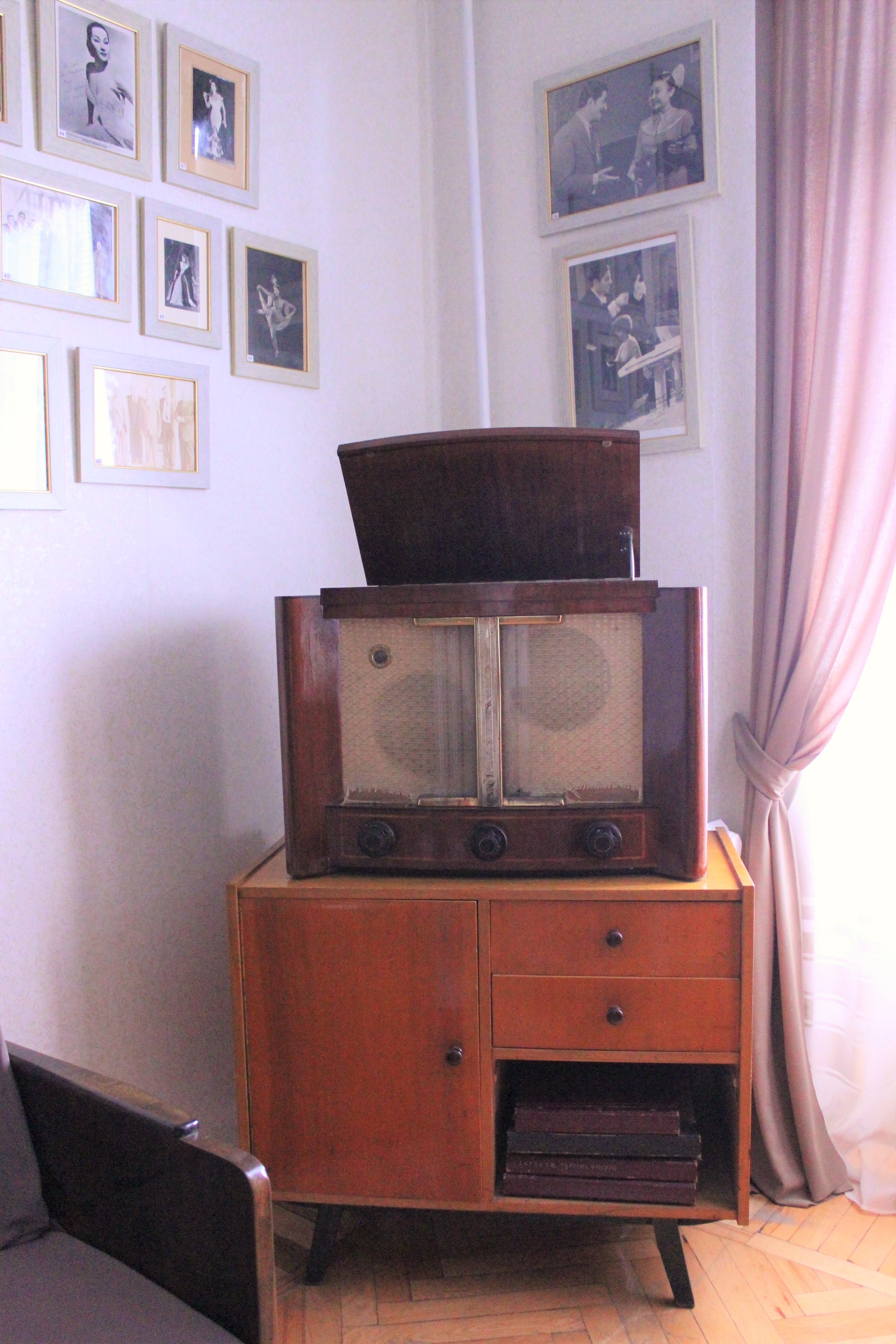
Exhibits of the museum

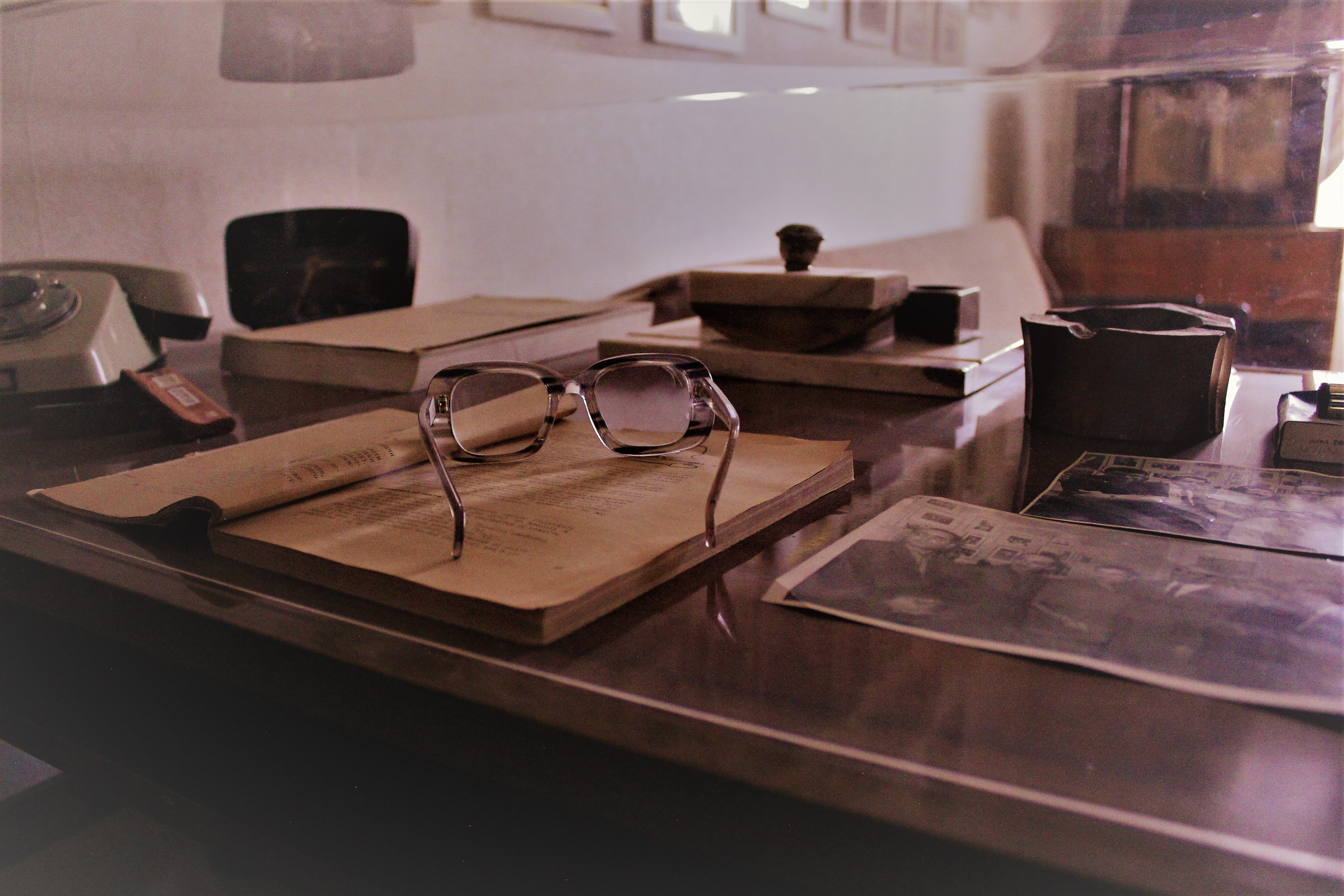
Exhibits of the museum. Niyazi's personal belongings

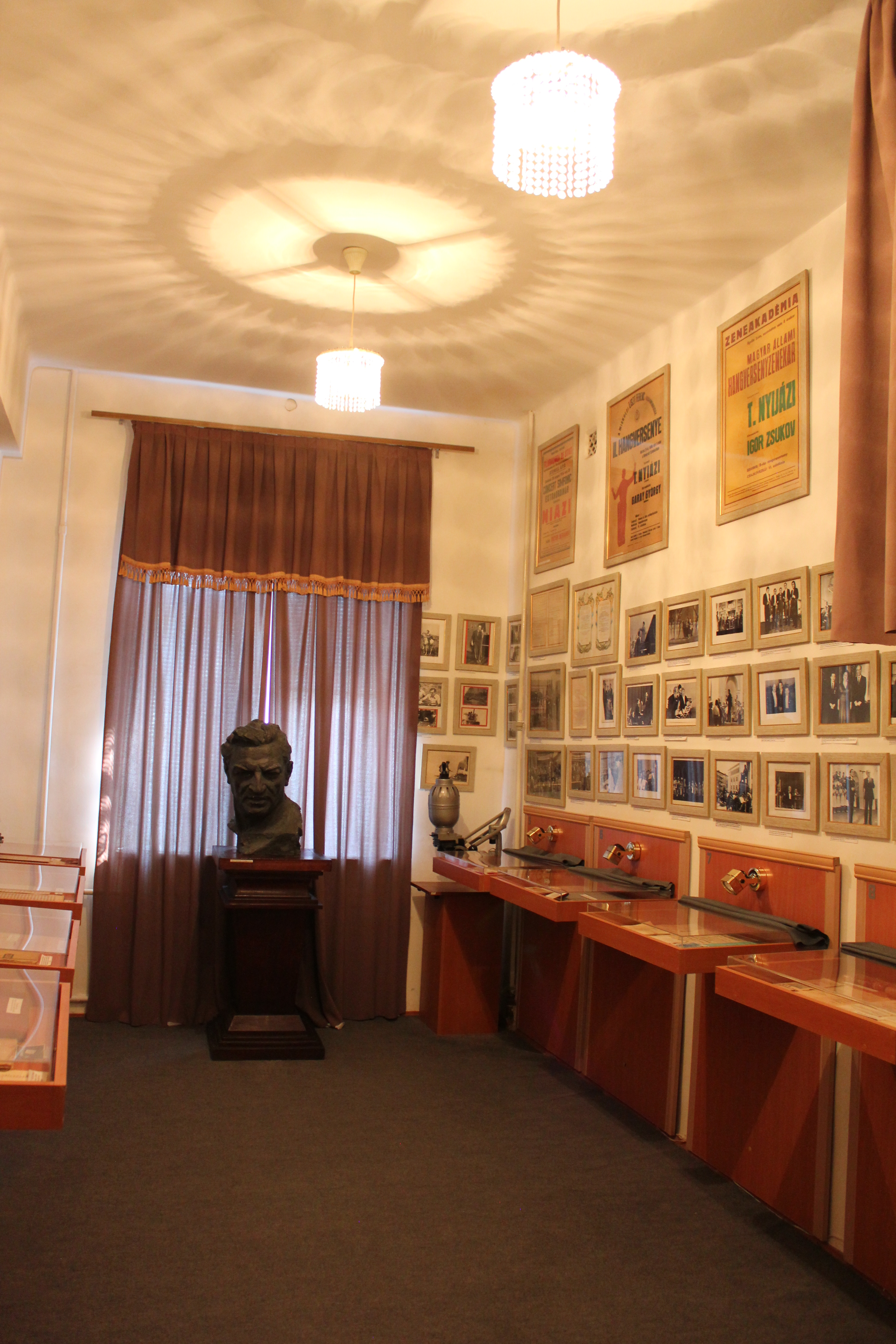
The materials of the exposition room reflect the creativity of Niyazi

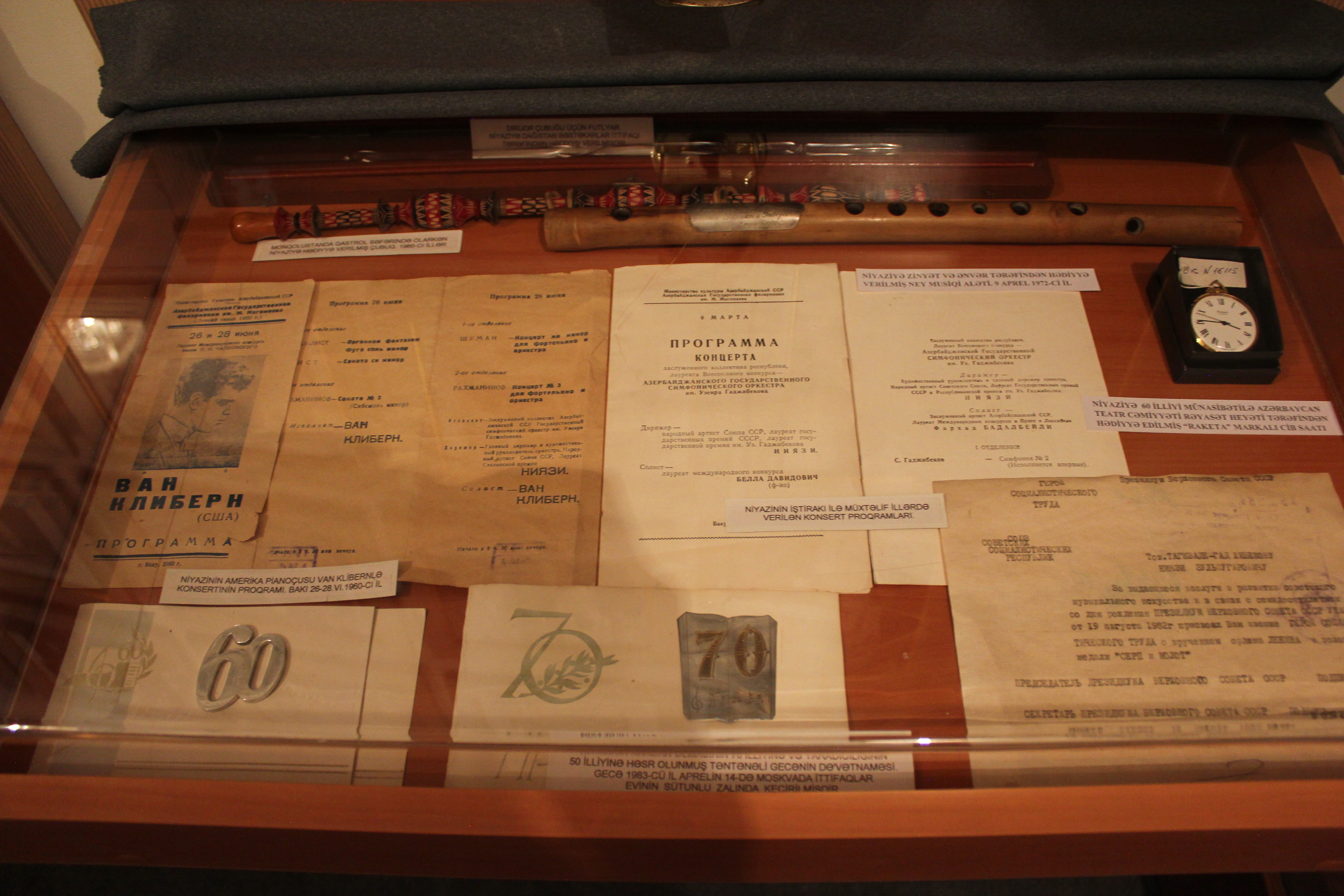
Exhibits of the museum

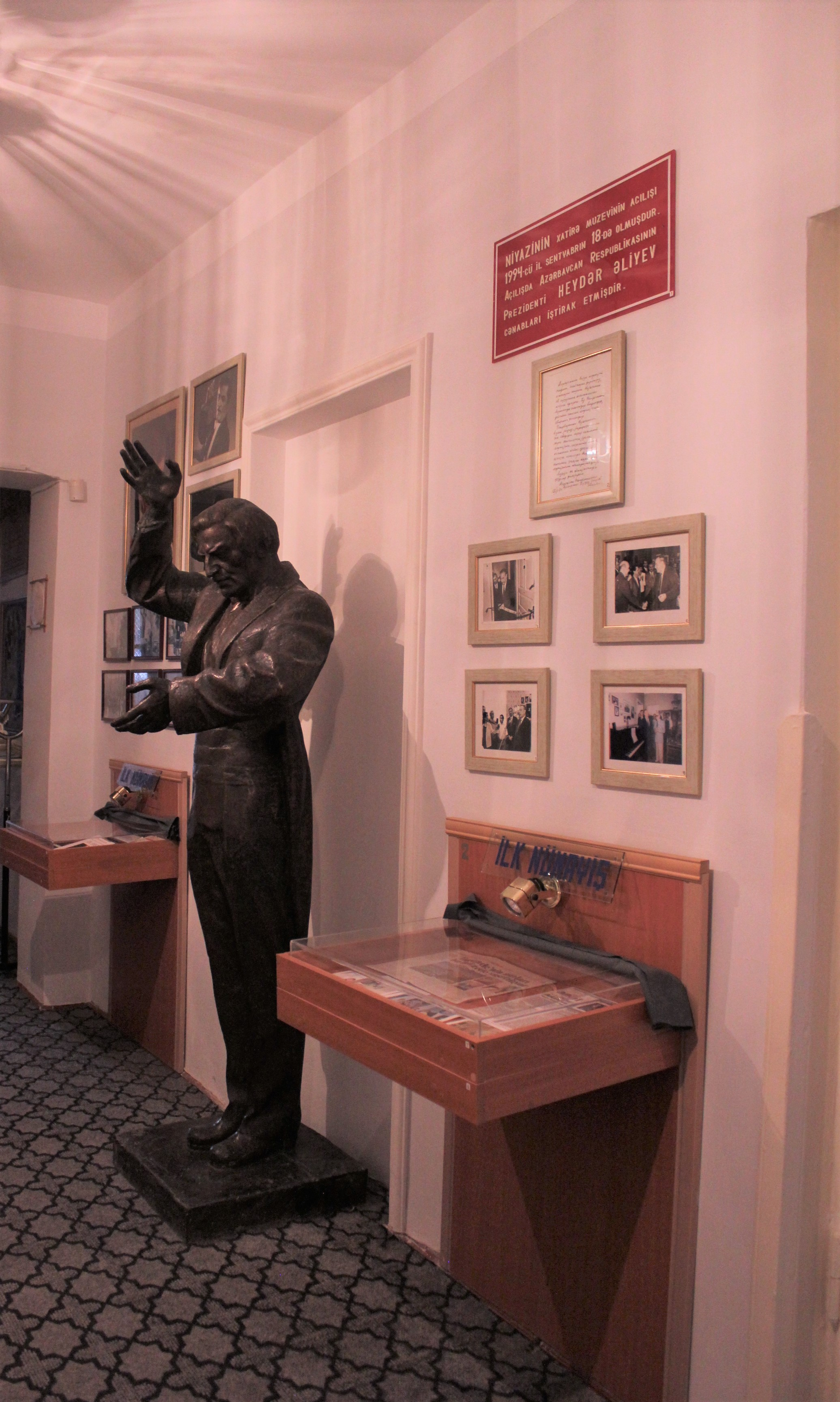
Exhibits of the museum

== See also ==
- Niyazi Zulfigar oglu Tagizade Hajibeyov
- Maestro Niyazi conducts his own piece - symphonic mugham of Rast
