= Arif Mirzayev =

Soviet musician (1944–2026)

- Arif Mirzəyev
- Mirzayev, in c. 2014
- Born: 10 April 1944; Baku, Azerbaijan SSR, USSR
- Died: 10 November 2026 (aged 82); Fulda, Hesse, Germany
- Occupations: Composer; Organist; Pianist
- Awards: Honored Art Worker of Azerbaijan
- Website: www.mirsojew.de

Arif Abdulla oglu Mirzayev (Azerbaijani: Arif Abdulla oğlu Mirzəyev; 10 April 1944 – 10 November 2026) was an Azerbaijani composer, organist and pianist active in the Soviet Union and Russia and in Germany later in his life. His surname is also given as Mirzojew and Mirzoev. He was a Bach scholar, and created in his works, mostly for organ, a synthesis of Eastern and Western music traditions. He played his compositions, especially the Organ Symphony in Memory of Bach, from 1986 at international venues including the Matthias Church in Budapest, Westminster Abbey in London, and the Washington National Cathedral.

== Life and career ==
Mirzayev was born in Baku on 10 April 1944 into a family with deep musical traditions. His father, Abdullah Kishi, was a tar player, and his brother, Musa Mirzayev, became a composer and professor. He first experienced a pipe organ at age five and later said that he was "captivated by its sound". Miryazev attended a school for musically gifted children. During this time he composed his first work, Chorale and Classical Fugue for organ. He studied at the Azerbaijan State Conservatoire with Gara Garayev. He studied further at the Moscow Conservatory, theory, history of organ music, and organ performing. He lived in Moscow from 1975 for 25 years.

Mirzayev introduced Western religious organ and polyphonic music to Azerbaijan, and also incorporated music of ancient Islam in his works, using polistylistics. He was a specialist for the music by Johann Sebastian Bach. In memory of Bach's birth in 1685, he composed an Organ Symphony in Memory of Bach in 1985, which he first performed in Kyiv in 1986, at the Tchaikovsky Concert Hall and the Grand Hall of the Philharmonic in Saint Petersburg, in Minsk, Tallinn, Kaliningrad, at the Matthias Church in Budapest, at Westminster Abbey in London in 1996, at the York Minster, and at the Washington National Cathedral, among others. He played the work for a 2010 Leipzig festival at the Nikolaikirche, together with works by Bach.

Mirzayev was a member of the Composers' Union of Russia and Azerbaijan from 1979, and a member of the New International Music Union named after J.S. Bach, in Leipzig from 1994.

Mirzayev moved to Fulda, Germany, in the 2000s, where he continued studies and gave concerts. He was noted as a musician from the Islamic tradition who performed a prayer service with choir in a Christian church there, the Johanniskirche.

=== Personal life ===
Mirzayev's wife was Tamara Mirzayeva.

Mirzayev died in Fulda on 10 November 2026, at the age of 82. (Note: Sources mislabel his age as "83".) His body was transferred to Baku where he was buried at the Gurd Gapisi Cemetery.

== Work ==
Mirzayev's works are polistylistic, incorporating neo-renaissance music of the East and West, based on music from the East – mugham ― and Western Baroque polyphony, and also spiritual music of various religious background, Islam and both Protestant and Catholic church music. Mirzayev wrote also chamber music, vocal music and jazz.

== Awards ==
Mirzayev was nominated for the State Prize of the Russian Federation in 2000 and 2002 in the art category, for his Organ Symphony. He was recognised as an Honored Art Worker of Azerbaijan in 2011 and also received an international "Heirs of Johann Sebastian Bach" medal.
