= Sabina Ilyasova =

- Genre: Mugham
- Years active: 1982–present

Sabina Ilyasova is an Azerbaijani singer recognized for her contributions to folk and popular music in Azerbaijan. Her performed songs are recorded in the AzTV Golden Fund.

== Biography ==
Born in Siyazan in 1959, she has received notable acclaim, including the title of Honored Artist of the Republic of Azerbaijan. In 1979–1984, she graduated from the "Mugham" class of the Asaf Zeynally Music College. She received mugham lessons from the honored teacher, master singer Nariman Aliyev.

From 1982 to 1989 she worked at the Azerbaijan State Song Theatre at the invitation of the world-famous singer and outstanding artist Rashid Behbudov.

In 1980–1991 the instrumental ensemble "Dan ulduzu" performed under the direction of the late artist Gulara Aliyeva.

1989–2013 she worked as a soloist at the Azerbaijan State Mugham Theater.

== Awards ==
- In 1979 she was awarded a first-degree diploma as the winner of the republican competition "Sing Tar" (Oxu Tar).
- In 1983 she was awarded a "First Degree" diploma as the winner of the republican competition "Mugham" organized in Khankendi.
- In 1999 she was awarded the title of laureate of the "Mahsati Ganjavi" award for her achievements in art.
- In 2012 according to Article 109, paragraph 23 of the Constitution of the Republic of Azerbaijan, she was awarded the honorary title of "Honored Artist" for her services to the development of Azerbaijani culture.
- Moscow Azerbaijan Variety Theatre and KIZ Royal of Ostankino TV Tower award Sabina as the winner of the nomination contribution to the development of Azerbaijan art.
- The Academy of Public Administration awarded her an Honorary Order under the President of the Republic of Azerbaijan for his active participation in the solemn events dedicated to the 82nd and 83rd birthdays of Heydar Aliyev.
