= Azerbaijan State Museum of Musical Culture =

Museum in Baku, Azerbaijan

- Azərbacan Musiqi Mədəniyyət Dövlət Muzeyi
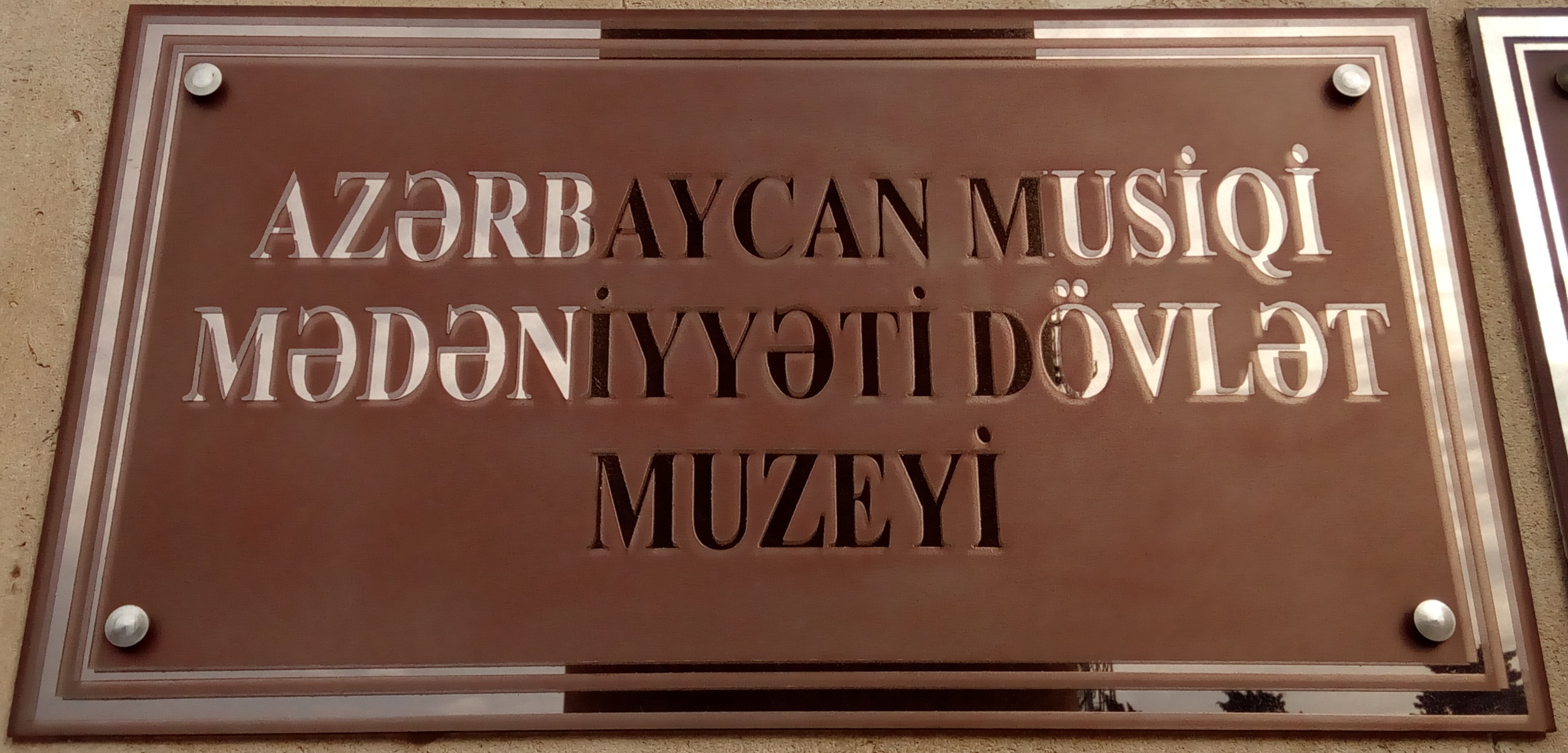
- Established: 1967
- Location: Azerbaijan, Baku, Neftchilar Avenue, 49
- Coordinates: 40.3665237°N 49.8326589°E
- Collection size: more than 20 000 items
- Website: Museum website

The Azerbaijan State Museum of Musical Culture (Azerbaijani: Azərbacan Musiqi Mədəniyyət Dövlət Muzeyi) was opened in 1967, in Baku. The goal of the museum is the collection, storage, investigation and popularization of materials related to the musical history of Azerbaijan.

== Exhibits ==
The museum has a collection size of more than 20,000 items. Among these exhibits are musical instruments such as the tar, kamancha, saz, qaval, qoshanaghara, zurna, and ney, and are rare instruments including the asa-tar and asa-saz.

The collection also includes gramophones, portable gramophones and gramophone records, and archives of opera singers such as H.Sarabski, F.Mukhtarov, M.Bagirov and others are included in this museum. In addition, there are music manuscripts, personal belongings, records, posters, programs, photos, works of visual arts, notes, and books in the collection.

The museum also runs the House-Museum of Niyazi.

== See also ==
- List of music museums
