= Amina Dilbazi =

Amina Dilbazi Əminə Dilbazi
- Born: December 26, 1919; Qazax, Kazakh uezd, Elizavetpol Governorate, Azerbaijan Democratic Republic
- Died: April 30, 2010 (aged 90); Baku, Azerbaijan
- Occupations: ballet master, dancer, pedagogue
- Awards

Amina Pasha qizi Dilbazi (Azerbaijani: Əminə Dilbazi; 26 December 1919, Qazakh, Azerbaijan – 30 April 2010, Baku, Azerbaijan) was an Azerbaijani folk dancer.

== Biography ==
Cousin of poet Mirvarid Dilbazi, Amina Dilbazi was born in a rural community near Qazakh, but grew up in Baku where the family settled after her older brother's death. Despite this, Dilbazi spoke Azeri with a distinct Qazakh drawl for rest of her life. At age 10, after suffering from severe tonsillitis, young Amina was diagnosed with paralysis, for which she underwent long-term treatment. At 16, she was already a recognised amateur gymnast, and around that time, she passed the audition to join the newly created Azerbaijan State Folk Song and Dance Ensemble. Her dance instructor was balletmaster Ilya Arbatov. In just three years, Dilbazi herself became assistant balletmaster of the said ensemble.

A major turning point of her career came later in the 1940s when Niyazi agreed to musically accompany Dilbazi's performance of the Turaji folk dance at a concert attended by Azerbaijan's ruling Stalinist elite, including the republic's Communist Party leader Mir Jafar Baghirov. Dilbazi had severely injured her knee during one of the practices and was advised by doctors not to perform, but she concealed this fact and made a successful performance under the risk of having her leg amputated. Dilbazi was hospitalised immediately after the concert and underwent treatment for many months. Niyazi found out about this risky exploit only on his deathbed in 1984; from a confession Dilbazi herself later bitterly regretted making. Turaji, however, came to be Dilbazi's favourite dance. As a balletmaster, she staged folk dances, the most famous ones being (in addition to Turaji) Innabi, Tarakama, Mirzai and Naz Elama. In 1949, she started working as a dance instructor at the Baku School of Choreography. In the following decades, she was the choreographer for a number of Azerbaijani musicals, including the 1956 film version of If Not That One, Then This One, where Dilbazi herself featured performing a dance in one of the scenes.

In 1959, the already retired Amina Dilbazi was recognised with the title of People's Artiste of the Azerbaijan SSR. After her retirement as a dancer, she continued her work as a dance instructor and artistic director of several dance ensembles.

== Personal life ==
In the early 1940s, during her Kirovabad tour, Amina Dilbazi met Fikrat Amirov who was three years her junior. Amirov proposed to her, and the two were due to get married but Dilbazi decided to break off their engagement, having been nurturing feelings for Jovdat Hajiyev, another young composer and her artistic director at the time. Hajiyev and Dilbazi registered their marriage before the end of World War II and remained happily married for nearly six decades (until Hajiyev's death in 2002), producing four children. Their elder son Ismayil Hajiyev is the conductor of the Canadian Silk Way Orchestra.

In March 2010, Amina Dilbazi suffered a stroke and died having failed to recover.

== See also ==
- List of People's Artistes of the Azerbaijan SSR
