= Aghabaji Rzayeva =

Azerbaijani composer (1912–1975)

Aghabaji Rzayeva Ağabacı Rzayeva
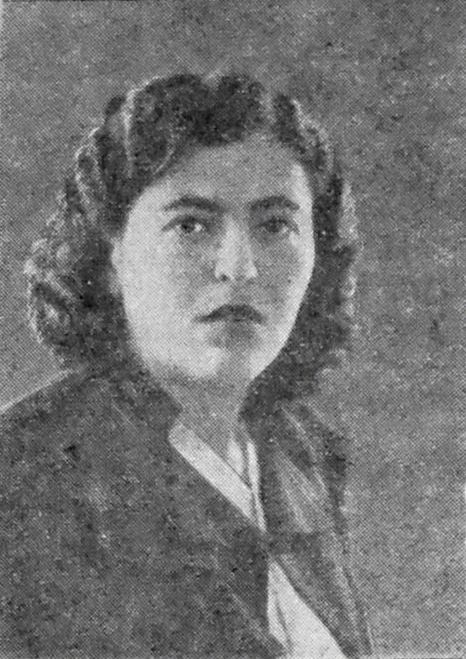

Background information
- Born: 15 December 1912; Baku, Russian Empire
- Died: 5 July 1975 (aged 62) Baku, Azerbaijan SSR, Soviet Union
- Occupation: Composer
- Education: Azerbaijan State Conservatoire
- Awards: Honored Art Worker of the Azerbaijan SSR Order of the Red Banner of Labour Order of the Badge of Honour

Aghabaji Ismayil gizi Rzayeva (Azerbaijani: Ağabacı İsmayıl qızı Rzayeva, December 15, 1912 – July 5, 1975) was the first female composer of Azerbaijan, Honored Art Worker of the Azerbaijan SSR.

== Biography ==
Aghabaji Rzayeva was born on December 15, 1912, in Baku. She graduated from the Baku Pedagogical College in 1929 and taught in Saray, Kurdakhani and Mashtaga for several years. A. Rzayeva took lessons from composer Said Rustamov on music and Mirza Mansur Mansurov on mugham. She studied in the composition class of Uzeyir Hajibeyov at Azerbaijan State Conservatoire. A year later, she was admitted to the Azerbaijan Folk Instruments Orchestra created by Uzeyir Hajibeyov. In 1938, she took part in the Decade of Azerbaijani Art in Moscow. She is the first female composer to receive professional music education both in Azerbaijan and in the whole East.

In 1935–1944, Rzayeva worked as a tar player in the Azerbaijan Folk Instruments Orchestra. She was the responsible music editor of Azerbaijan Radio.

Rzayeva's first important musical work was the "Vətənpərvərlik Marşı" written in 1941 for an orchestra of folk instruments. He is also the author of a number of songs and romances, the musical comedy "Mübahisə etmə" (1965, with I. Guliyev), plays for the string quartet of the orchestra of folk instruments. Most of his songs (more than 60) are dedicated to children. In addition, Rzayeva composed seven romances to the lyrics of the great poet Nasimi.

She was elected deputy to the Baku Soviet three times in 1950, 1953 and 1955, and in 1963 she was a member of the Supreme Soviet of the Azerbaijan SSR.

Aghabaji Rzayeva died on July 5, 1975, in Baku and was buried in the II Alley of Honor.

== Awards ==
- Honored Art Worker of the Azerbaijan SSR — 1960
- Order of the Red Banner of Labour
- Order of the Badge of Honour — 1972

== Sources ==
- Üzeyir Hacıbəyov Ensiklopediyası. Bakı, 2007. səh.181.
- Babayeva, H. Nəğmələrdə yaşayan ömur- Ağabacı Rzayeva – 100: //525-ci qəzet.- 2012.- 26 dekabr.- S. 5.
- Əsgərova, Z. Nəğmələrdə “gəlin” köçən arzular: [görkəmli bəstəkar haqqında] //Mədəniyyət.- 2012.- 14 dekabr.- S. 10; Kaspi.- 2012.- 6 dekabr.- S.12.
- Xəlilzadə, F. Sənət xəzinəmizin bəzəyi //Azərbaycan.- 2012.- 13 dekabr.- S.7.
- Osmanova, A. Azərbaycanın ilk qadın bəstəkarının 100 illik yubileyi qeyd olundu //Mərkəz.- 2012.- 13 dekabr.- S.14.
- Təranə. Böyük sənətkarlara ən böyük qiyməti zaman verir: [R.Behbudov adına Dövlət Mahnı Teatrında görkəmli bəstəkarın yubileyinə həsr edilmiş tədbir keçirildi] //Mədəniyyət. - 2012.- 12 dekabr.- S. 7.
- Vahid, T. “Biz səni heç vaxt unutmayacağıq” //Mədəniyyət.- 2012.- 7 dekabr.- S. 12.
