= Ismayil Hajiyev =

Azerbaijani-Canadian conductor and composer

Ismayil Ahmad Jovdat oglu Hajiyev (Azerbaijani: İsmayıl Əhməd Cövdət oğlu Hacıyev; born 18 November 1949) is an Azerbaijani Canadian conductor and composer. He is the son of Azerbaijani composer Jovdat Hajiyev and folk dancer Amina Dilbazi.

== Early life and education ==
In 1973 Ismail Hajiyev graduated from the Azerbaijan State Conservatoire with high honours in the field of Theory of Music and Composition under mentorship of famous Azerbaijani composer Qara Qarayev, and received a degree of the Master of Music.

== Career ==
In 1975 he became a member of the Union of Composers of the USSR and created symphonies, symphonic variations, string quarters, three symphonic poems, piano compositions and passacaglia for the orchestra. In 1975-1981 Hajiyev studied in Saint Petersburg Conservatory specialising in Opera and Symphonic Conducting under the supervision of Professor Ilya Musin, and Musical Director of St. Petersburg Kirov Theater, and the Principal Guest Conductor of Metropolitan Opera, New York, Valery Gergiev. After graduation, he became an assistant to the Saint Petersburg Philharmonic Orchestra Artistic Director, Evgeny Mravinsky. In this period of time, Hajiyev made a lot of recordings with his performances.

In 1985, Ismayil Hajiyev created the first Commercial Chamber Orchestra of Classical and Contemporary music called Ilham in Azerbaijan. With this orchestra, he toured around the world and gave numerous successful performances. Ilham's repertoire included both Western and Oriental musical compositions.

Since 1999, Ismayil Hajiyev has resided in Canada. In 2001, he founded the Silk Road Chamber Orchestra in Canada. With this orchestra, he has given a series of successful performances in Toronto, Ottawa and Niagara-on-the-Lake.
