= Rauf Abdullayev =

Azerbaijani conductor

- Born: October 29, 1937 (age 88); Baku, Azerbaijan SSR, USSR
- Genres: symphonic music
- Occupation: conductor
- Years active: 1965–present
- Citizenship: Soviet Union; Azerbaijan
- Education: Hajibeyov Azerbaijan State Conservatoire; Leningrad State Conservatory
- Awards

Rauf Janbakhish oghlu Abdullayev (Azerbaijani: Rauf Canbaxış oğlu Abdullayev, 29 October 1937) is a chief conductor of Azerbaijan State Symphony Orchestra, professor, People's Artist of the Azerbaijan SSR, laureate of the State Prize of the Azerbaijan SSR, Istiglal Order and "Golden Plane" international award.

== Early life and education ==
Rauf Abdullayev was born on October 29, 1937, in Baku. He graduated from Hajibeyov Azerbaijan State Conservatoire (1959) and Leningrad State Conservatory (1965) in conducting.

== Career ==
He was the chief conductor of Azerbaijan State Academic Opera and Ballet Theater from 1965 to 1984, art director and chief conductor of Ankara State Opera and Ballet Theater from 1991 to 1994 and since 1984 he has been the art director and chief conductor of Azerbaijan State Symphony Orchestra. In the 1970s, he was one of the founders of the Modern Music Chamber Orchestra and the BAKARA ensemble.

For more than 20 years, he has conducted about 30 opera and ballet performances (both classical and modern repertoire) as the chief conductor of the theater. He performed in many countries with famous collectives (Russia, Germany, Netherlands, Switzerland, France, Turkey, Egypt, United States, Italy, Dubai, etc.). His repertoire includes works by many Western European, Russian and Azerbaijani composers.

== Awards ==
- People's Artist of the Azerbaijan SSR — December 1, 1982
- Honored Art Worker of the Azerbaijan SSR — May 21, 1970
- State Prize of the Azerbaijan SSR — 1988
- Honorary Decree of the Supreme Soviet of the Azerbaijan SSR — February 24, 1979
- Istiglal Order — October 28, 2017
- Sharaf Order — October 22, 2012
- Shohrat Order — December 6, 1997
- "Golden Plane" international award — May 10, 2018
- Heydar Aliyev Order — May 10, 2023

Rauf Abdullayev was twice awarded the title of "Best Conductor of the Year" in Turkey for his work as a conductor at Ankara State Opera and Ballet Theater, where he worked as chief conductor from 1993 to 1997.

== Filmography ==
- Babek (film, 1979)
- Seven Beauties (film, 1982)
- Buta (film, 2011)
- The day of the murder (film, 1990)
- Life of Javid (film, 2007)
- Javad Khan (film, 2009)
- Death turn (film, 2009)
- Maestro Niyazi (film, 2007)
- Prisoners (film, 2007)
- Maestro (film, 2002)
