= Mirza Mansur Mansurov =

Mirza Mansur Mansurov Mirzə Mansur Mansurov
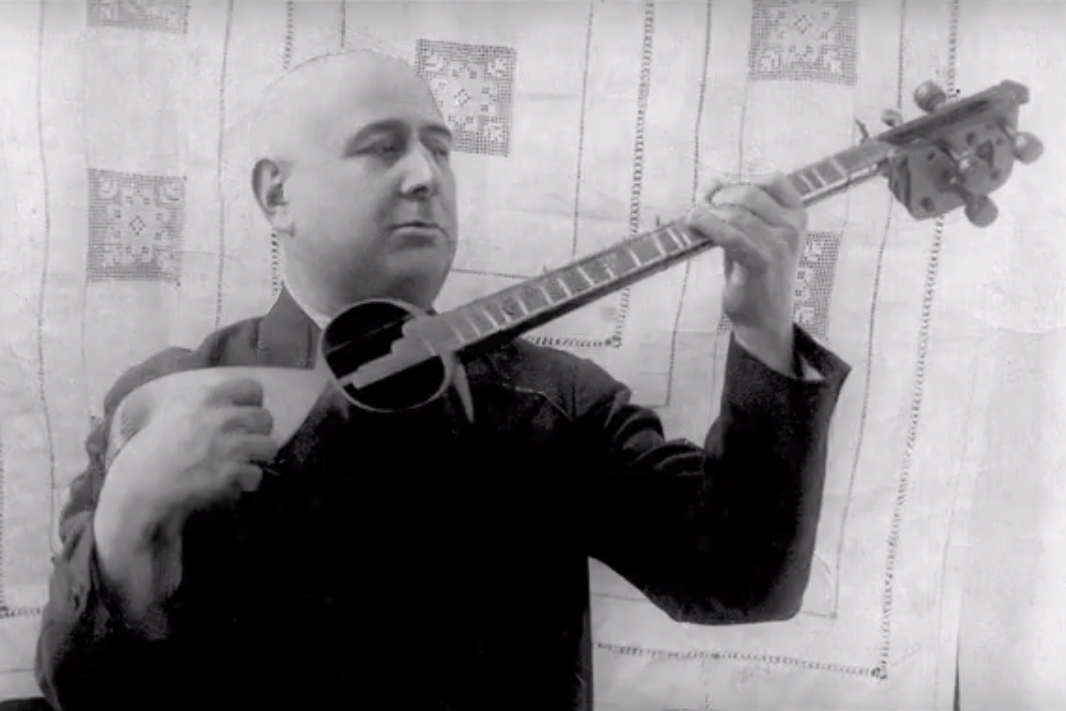

Background information
- Born: January 5, 1887; Baku, Baku Governorate, Russian Empire
- Died: June 30, 1967 (aged 80); Baku, Azerbaijan SSR, USSR
- Genres: mugham
- Instrument: tar
- Awards: Honored Art Worker of the Azerbaijan SSR

Mirza Mansur Mashadi Malik oghlu Mansurov (Azerbaijani: Mirzə Mansur Məşədi Məlik oğlu Mansurov, January 5, 1887 — June 30, 1967) was an Azerbaijani tar player, pedagogue, Honored Art Worker of the Azerbaijan SSR.

== Biography ==
Mirza Mansur was born on January 5, 1887, in Baku. At the age of 11, he studied at a madrasa in the Siniggala Mosque and learned Persian perfectly. Mirza Mansur's father Mashadi Malik bey is known as the founder of Baku Mugham Gatherings. Mirza Mansur took his first tar lessons from the tar player Mirza Faraj Rzayev. His first mugham performances were "Shur" and "Rast". Mirza Mansur was a worthy successor of Sadigjan school.

he was known as a mugham theorist. After 1920, he taught tar at the Eastern Conservatory, and in 1923 at the Azerbaijan State Turkish Music College organized by Uzeyir Hajibeyov. In 1926–1946, he taught mugham at the Azerbaijan State Conservatory. Mirza Mansur was the person who made the first mugam curriculum for tar class. On the instructions of Uzeyir Hajibeyov, young composers Tofig Guliyev and Zakir Baghirov first recorded "Rast", "Dugah" and "Zabul" mughams performed by Mirza Mansur in the mid-1930s.

He improved the tar instrument and brought innovations to the reconstruction of the tar. One of the four tars invented by Mirza Mansur is preserved in the Hermitage, the second in the Louvre, and the third in the museum in Istanbul. He kept the last tar. Two tape recordings of Mirza Mansur performed on the tar remained: "Khojasta" and "Mahur-Hindi" mughams.

Mirza Mansur died on June 30, 1967, in Baku.

== Awards ==
- Honored Art Worker of the Azerbaijan SSR — April 23, 1940
