= Aygun Samedzade =

Azerbaijani composer (born 1967)

- Born: Aygun Ziyad gizi Samedzade; January 11, 1967 (age 59)
- Origin: Baku, Azerbaijan SSR
- Genres: Pop, traditional, classic
- Occupations: Composer, songwriter, musician
- Instrument: Piano
- Years active: 1999–present
- Label: Nefes Art Group

Aygun Ziyad gizi Samedzade (Azerbaijani: Aygün Ziyad qızı Səmədzadə, IPA: [ɑjˈɟʏn ziˌjɑːd‿gɯˌzɯ sæˌmædzɑːˈdæ]; born 11 January 1967) is an Azerbaijani composer and songwriter. She has been People's Artist of Azerbaijan since 2018.

== Biography ==
Aygun Samedzade was born on January 11, 1967, in Baku, Azerbaijan. She got her primary education at the Bulbul Music School and graduated with a gold medal and an individual scholarship in 1985. In the same year she entered to the Faculty of History and Theory of the Azerbaijan State Conservatory (now the Baku Music Academy) and was a participant and winner of a number of republican and all-Union scientific conferences and competitions. She was awarded with a diploma in the competition that dedicated to the 100th anniversary of Uzeyir Hajibeyov, a gold medal for the best student's scientific work at the III Republican Scientific Conference and a first-class diploma in the competition that held among the countries of Caucasus. After graduating with an Honorary Diploma and an individual scholarship named after Uzeyir Hajibeyov, she started working as a teacher at the Department of “History of Music”, taught the history of music in European countries, music culture of Turkic speaking peoples, music criticism and was an associate professor of the same department in the same year.

Composer, musicologist Aygun Samedzade has been a member of the Union of Composers of Azerbaijan since 2003. In 2003, Aygun Samedzade defended her Phd dissertation on the works of great Turkish composer Ahmet Adnan Saygun. In addition she is the author of a number of scientific articles and articles on the history of Azerbaijani music, including "The role of art patronage in Azerbaijan" ("Azərbaycanda sənət himayədarlığının rolu"), "Khurshudbanu Natavan and Azerbaijani culture" ("Xurşudbanu Natəvan və Azərbaycan mədəniyyəti"),"Shah Ismail Khatai and Azerbaijani culture"("Şah İsmayıl Xətai və Azərbaycan mədəniyyəti"), "Mir Movsun Navvab" ("Mir Mövsün Nəvvab"), "Haji Zeynalabdin Tagiyev's contribution to the development of Azerbaijan’s culture" ("Hacı Zeynalabdin Tağıyevin mədəniyyətimizin inkişafında xidmətləri"), "Some stylistic features of Adnan Saygun's work"("Adnan Sayqun yaradıcılığının bəzi üslub xüsusiyyətləri").

Aygun Samedzade is the author of the more than 200 songs which has a special place in the repertoire of many famous singers. Many of these songs are concentrated in the album "Bu dünyanı nağıl bilək", the album "Əhməd Cavad", the album "Azərbaycan" which consisted of 4 discs and the album "Vətən mahnıları".

Aygun Samedzade also composed music for many theater performances and movies. She is the composer of the movies, including Elchin Afandiyev's "Killer", "Shakespeare", Huseyn Javid's "Amir Teymur", "Iblis", Ilgar Fahmi's "I am, I…", Stefan Zweig's "Letter from a Stranger Woman", "Additional Impact", "Mystery".

Aygun Samadzade is the author of "Turkestan", "Hasret, Gumsal", "Eshq" symphonies, vocal-choreographic composition named after Hazrat-i Fatima, Independence Anthem dedicated to the 100th anniversary of the Republic. She composed a series of songs such as the "Diaspora Anthem", "Can Azerbaijan", "Victory Song", "My Hero" during the war. Among her recent projects is "The end of longing" a musical work dedicated to Azerbaijan's victory in the Second Karabakh War. The video of the song was filmed in territories reclaimed by Azerbaijan following the war. The project can be considered to be an artistic initiative intended to communicate wartime experiences and the impact of destruction of the war in these areas through music and visual media.

Aygun Samedzade also created a series of works on Ahmad Javad’s poems, including "The Turkish cantata", "Ey Turk", "Bismillah", "Türk ordusuna", "Elin bayrağı", "Mən bulmuşam" and instrumental composition called "Sen aglama", romances "Niye gelmedin", "Qurban oldugum" and others. The premieres of these works took place on September 15, 2018, in Ankara, on November 10, 2018, in Baku, and on March 20, 2019, in Eskisehir. The works were performed by the Turkish Presidential Symphony Orchestra, the TRT Choir and the Azerbaijan State Symphony Orchestra. In the 2000, at "Best of Best “competition, her “Məktəb illəri", in 2002, at "Song of the songs Competition-Festival", "Bu dünyanı nağıl bilək", "Yağış" songs were awarded first places, and "Tut ağacım" was awarded the Grand Prix and Audience Choice Awards.

In 2008, a song called "Qelebe cal" was awarded first place by the National Olympic Committee, together with the Ministry of Culture and Tourism and the Union of Composers of Azerbaijan at the song contest on "Sports and Olympics". Many concert programs dedicated to her songs were organized at the Heydar Aliyev Palace in 2005, 2009, 2015, at the International Mugam Center in 2015, at the Silk Road International Music Festival in Sheki in 2017, at the Green Theater on the occasion of the 100th anniversary of the Republic on June 9, 2018.

Aygun Samedzade was the author and head of a number of television projects related to the promotion of Azerbaijani culture, including "Əslində Mən", "Bir mahnının tarixçəsi", "İntrada", "Ekspromt". In 2019, she was the author and project manager of the project called "Azerbaijan in 100 songs", consisting of songs about the homeland by Azerbaijani composers.

Aygun Samedzade has been the head of the NEFES Art Center since 2012.

On September 15, 2011, she was awarded the title of Honored Art Worker of the Republic of Azerbaijan, and on May 27, 2018, she was awarded the title of People's Artist of Azerbaijan.

== Works ==
=== Songs ===
- Ad günü I (versiya 1) – Rəşad İlyasov
- Ad günü I (versiya 1) – Aysel Əlizadə
- Ad günü II (versiya 1) – Aygün Kazımova
- Ad günü II (versiya 2) – Ayaz Qasımov
- Ağla – Eyyub Yaqubov
- Ayrılıq – İlahə Fəda
- Azərbaycan – Nurlan Növrəsli, Qismət Məmmədzadə, Leyla İdrisova, Aygün Kazımova, İlqar Muradov, Elton Hüseynəliyev
- Azərbaycan – Vüsal Hacıyev
- Bakı haqqında nağıl – Eyyub Yaqubov
- Bakı küləyi – Eyyub Yaqubov
- Bakım – Elvin Rəcəbov
- Bakım mənim – Abbas Bağırov
- Bakinskiy roman – Qismət Məmmədzadə
- Bağışla – Lalə Məmmədova
- Bayatılar – Gülüstan Əliyeva
- Bilirəm – Kəmalə Əhmədova
- Bir sevgi (versiya 1) – Nüşabə Ələsgərli
- Bir sevgi (versiya 2) – Lalə Məmmədova
- Bismillah (versiya 1) – Orxan Cəlilov
- Bismillah (versiya 2) – Teyyub Aslanov
- Bizdən danışaq – Aygün Kazımova, Rauf Əhmədov
- Bu dünyanı nağıl bilək – İlqar Muradov
- Bu gecə – Aygun Samedzade
- Bu sevgi – Fidan Süleymanova
- Bu şəhər ikimizindir – Ayaz Qasımov
- Can Azərbaycan – Kəmalə Əhmədova
- Darıxdım – Aygün Bəylər
- De ki – Brilliant Dadashova
- Deyirdilər inanmırdım – Nurlan Növrəsli
- Dəli eşq – Lalə Məmmədova
- Dəniz – Nigar Cəlilova
- Diaspora marşı – Pərviz Abdullayev, Almaxanım Əhmədli, Orxan Cəlilov, Ayaz Qasımov, Kəmalə Əhmədova, Vüsal Hacıyev, Nigar Cəlilova
- Dostum – Parviz Abdullayev
- Duman, al, apar məni! – Şeron qrupu
- Elegiya – Ayaz Qasımov
- Elin bayrağı – Vüsal Hacıyev, Nurlan Növrəsli, Parviz Abdullayev, Orxan Cəilov, Emin Zeynallı
- Eşidirsənsə tələs – Elton Hüseynəliyev
- Eşq yağışı – Parviz Abdullayev
- Ey, vətən! – Ayaz Qasımov
- Ey Türk- Teyyub Aslanov, Orxan Cəlilov, Nigar Cəlilova
- Gecələr – Azerin
- Gecə valsı – Nurlan Növrəsli
- Gecikmiş etiraf – Aygun Samedzade, Vüsal Hacıyev
- Gəl qayıdaq bu sahilə – Rəşad İlyasov
- Gəncə – Abbas Bağırov
- Gəncə – Ayaz Qasımov
- Gözəlimsən – Aygun Samedzade, Ayaz Qasımov
- Gözlərindən gülənim (versiya 1) – Nüşabə Ələsgərli
- Gözlərindən gülənim (versiya 2) – Leyla İdrisova
- Gözüm səni axtarır – Nüşabə Ələsgərli
- Həsrət nəğməsi – Rəşad İlyasov
- İnan, günəş doğacaq – Brilliant Dadashova, Vüsal Hacıyev, Zamiq Hüseynov, Günay İbrahimli, Orxan Cəlilov, Parviz Abdullayev, Nigar Cəlilova, Aygün Kazımova, Lamiyə Haşımova
- İstəmirəm bu eşqi – Mətanət İsgəndərli
- İstiqlal – Parviz Abdullayev, Günay İbrahimli, Nigar Cəlilova, Vüsal Hacıyev, Ayaz Qasımov, Kamilə Nəbiyeva, Orxan Cəlilov
- Kaderinle barış – Günay İbrahimli
- Köçüm gərək bu şəhərdən – Gülüstan Əliyeva
- Qəhrəmanım – Aygun Samedzade, İlqar Muradov, Kəmalə Əhmədova, Eyyub Yaqubov, Abbas Bağırov
- Qəfil zəng – Ayaz Qasımov
- Qəlbində gizli yaşayım – Elnur Məmmədov
- Qələbə çal – Aygün Bəylər, Ayaz Qasımov, Natavan Habibi, Şeron qrupu, Fidan Süleymanova
- Qurban olduğum- Parviz Abdullayev, Nigar Cəlilova
- Layla – Leyla İdrisova
- Məktəb illəri – Lalə Məmmədova
- Məktub – Zəminə Rəhimova
- Mən bulmuşam – Malakkhanim Ayyubova
- Mən də varam – Hacı Nazim
- Mənim soyadımda – Lalə Məmmədova
- Neyləyim? – Zulfiyya Khanbabayeva
- Nədən həyat? – Röya Ayxan
- Niyə gəlmədin? – Parviz Abdullayev
- Olmadı olmaz – Aygun Samedzade
- Ömrümüzün ilk sevgisi – Elnur Məmmədov
- Ömür gedir – Aygun Samedzade
- Payız yağışı – Elton Hüseynəliyev
- Peşmanam – Ayaz Qasımov
- Ruhumuz qovuşacaq – Flora Karimova
- Sevəcəksən gizlicə – Ayaz Qasımov, Hava Dolev
- Sevgi deyilmiş – Rəşad İlyasov
- Sən bizimləsən – Brilliant Dadashova, Ilqar Muradov
- Səndən danışmaq nə xoş – Fidan Süleymanova
- Sənə möhtacam – Şeron qrupu
- Sənətkar taleyi – Aygun Samedzade
- Sənli günlərimçün darıxmışam – Ilhama Guliyeva
- Subaylığın son gecəsi – Elton Hüseynəliyev
- Susan mahnı – Aygun Samedzade
- Şəhidlərə – Vüsal Hacıyev, Almaxanım Əhmədli, Nigar Cəlilova, Nurlan Növrəsli, Parviz Abdullayev, Orxan Cəlilov, Emin Zeynallı
- Tənha royal – İlqar Muradov
- Tut ağacım – Aygün Bəylər
- Tut ağacım – Akif Süleymanbəyli
- Tut əlimdən – Emil Bədəlov
- Türk ordusuna – Nigar Cəlilova
- Unuda bilmirəm – Aytac Vidadiqızı
- Unut bir anlıq – Gülüstan Əliyeva
- Yağış – Eyyub Yaqubov
- Yar onun – Rəşad İlyasov
- Yarpaqlar titrəsə – Vüsal Hacıyev, Aynur Xəlilov, Nərmin Süleymanova
- Yeni il – Vüsal Hacıyev, Leyla İdrisova, Ayaz Qasımov, Ceyhun Zeynalov, Fidan Süleymanova, Yaşar Yusub
- Yol gedirəm (versiya 1) – Aygün Kazımova
- Yol gedirəm (versiya 2) – Nigar Cəlilova
- Zəfər nəğməsi – Günay İbrahimli
