= Zakir Baghirov (composer) =

Zakir Baghirov Zakir Bağırov
- Born: March 16, 1916; Shusha, Shusha uezd, Elizavetpol Governorate, Russian Empire
- Died: January 8, 1996 (aged 79) Baku, Azerbaijan
- Genres: opera, classical music
- Occupation: composer
- Years active: 1949–1992
- Education: Moscow State Conservatory
- Awards: Honored Art Worker of the Azerbaijan SSR Order of the Badge of Honour

Zakir Javad oghlu Baghirov (Azerbaijani: Zakir Cavad oğlu Bağırov, March 16, 1916–January 8, 1996) was an Azerbaijani composer, professor, and Honored Art Worker of the Azerbaijan SSR.

== Biography ==
Zakir Baghirov was born on March 16, 1916, in Shusha. After graduating from the Moscow State Conservatory in 1949, he worked as a teacher at the Hajibeyov Azerbaijan State Conservatoire. From 1970 he was the head of the department of music theory. He has been a member of the Composers Union of Azerbaijan since 1950, as well as a member of the Board of this union. In different years, he worked as the art director of the Muslim Magomayev Azerbaijan State Philharmonic Hall, the art director of the Committee for Television and Radio Broadcasting of the Republic, the chairman of the Board of the Azerbaijan Music Foundation.

For the first time in 1935, Zakir Bagirov, together with composer Tofig Guliyev, wrote and published mughams "Rast", "Dugah" and "Zabul" performed by tar player Mirza Mansur Mansurov. He is also one of the authors of the collection "Azerbaijani folk dances" (1951).

Z. Baghirov died on January 8, 1996, in Baku.

== Awards and honorary titles ==
- Honored Art Worker of the Azerbaijan SSR — May 24, 1960
- Order of the Badge of Honour — June 9, 1959
- Medal "For Distinguished Labour" — August 22, 1986
