= Yegana Akhundova =

Yegana Akhundova Yeganə Əsgər qızı Axundova
- Born: May 22, 1960; Sheki, Azerbaijan SSR, USSR
- Origin: Azerbaijan
- Occupations: Pianist, composer, teacher

Yegana Akhundova (Azerbaijani: Yeganə Əsgər qızı Axundova; born May 22, 1960, Sheki, Azerbaijan SSR, USSR) is an Azerbaijani pianist, composer, and teacher. She has held the title of People's Artist of Azerbaijan since 2012.

== Biography ==
Yegana Akhundova was born on May 22, 1960, in Sheki, Azerbaijan.

In 1983 she graduated from the Azerbaijan National Conservatory named after U.Hajibeyov (N.Usubova's class) and, in 1985, completed her on-job training under the guidance of professor Lev Naumov in Moscow State Conservatory.

There are different music styles and epochs in the repertoire of Yegana Akhundova: Bach, Beethoven, Mozart, Chopin, Schumann, Liszt, Debussy, Rakhmaninov, Shostakovich and others including the works of the Azerbaijanian composers Uzeyir Hajibeyli, Gara Garayev, Fikrat Amirov, Jeyhun Hajibeyli, and Arif Malikov.

Yegana Akhundova has numerous concert tours abroad; she played in Germany, Greece, Italy, Norway, Turkey, France, Austria, Poland, Great Britain, Russia, Spain, Hungary, Morocco, and Romania. She performed with the Budapest's "Duna Palota" (Hungary) and UK Royal Filarmonic Orchestras as well as the Istanbul, Israel, Johannesburg, and Vienna Chamber Orchestras in collaboration with the famous conductors K. Kerssenbrok, Sh. Minz, J. Lorenza, N. Nakata, R. Abdullayev, R. Melikaslanov, E. Bagirov, Y. Adygozalov, and E. Guliyev.

Yegana Akhundova has been working in Azerbaijan National Conservatory as a piano teacher since 1984, as a senior lecturer since 2003, and as the Vice-Rector on International Relations since 2005. In 2009 she was conferred an honorary professor degree.

Yegana Akhundova has been actively composing all these years; she is the author of numerous piano preludes, sonatinas, "Ashug" concert play for two pianos and various songs. The "Mi Parti" video clip which was shot to the music of Yegana Akhundova won the "Best Musical Video Clip on TV in Azerbaijan" award. Later, she composed the music for another 2 video clips "İthaf" and "Mea memoria".

Yegana Akhundova has given lectures on Azerbaijan and World Culture at Khazar University since 2005. In December 2006 she initiated the premiere of Uzeyir Hajibeyov's famous musical comedy "Arshin Mal Alan" in English, with the participation of the students and teachers of Khazar University.

== Scientific works ==
- "Rakhmaninov's Piano Concerts"
- "Methodological and Performing Analysis of A. A. Skryabin's Piano Sonata No. 3"
- "Issues of contemporary performing arts"
- "Performing arts as the artistic creativity"
- "Analysis of the performance of Rakhmaninov's 13 preludes"
- Various textbooks for elementary & secondary school pupils as well as the high school students

== Awards and Titles ==
Diploma of the Trans Caucasus International Piano Festival in Baku (Azerbaijan 1985)

- The Title of "Honored Artist of Azerbaijan" (2006)
- "Humai" National Award (2007)
- Yousif Mammadaliyev's Medal (2007)
- International Euro-American Women's Consortium (EAWC in Greece) award – "Woman of Achievements"
- "Golden Muse of Niagara" International Award (Canada, Niagara International Music Festival, 2007)
- The Title of "National Artist of Azerbaijan" (2012)
