= Azerbaijan National Conservatory Music College =

Asaf Zeynally Music School in Baku
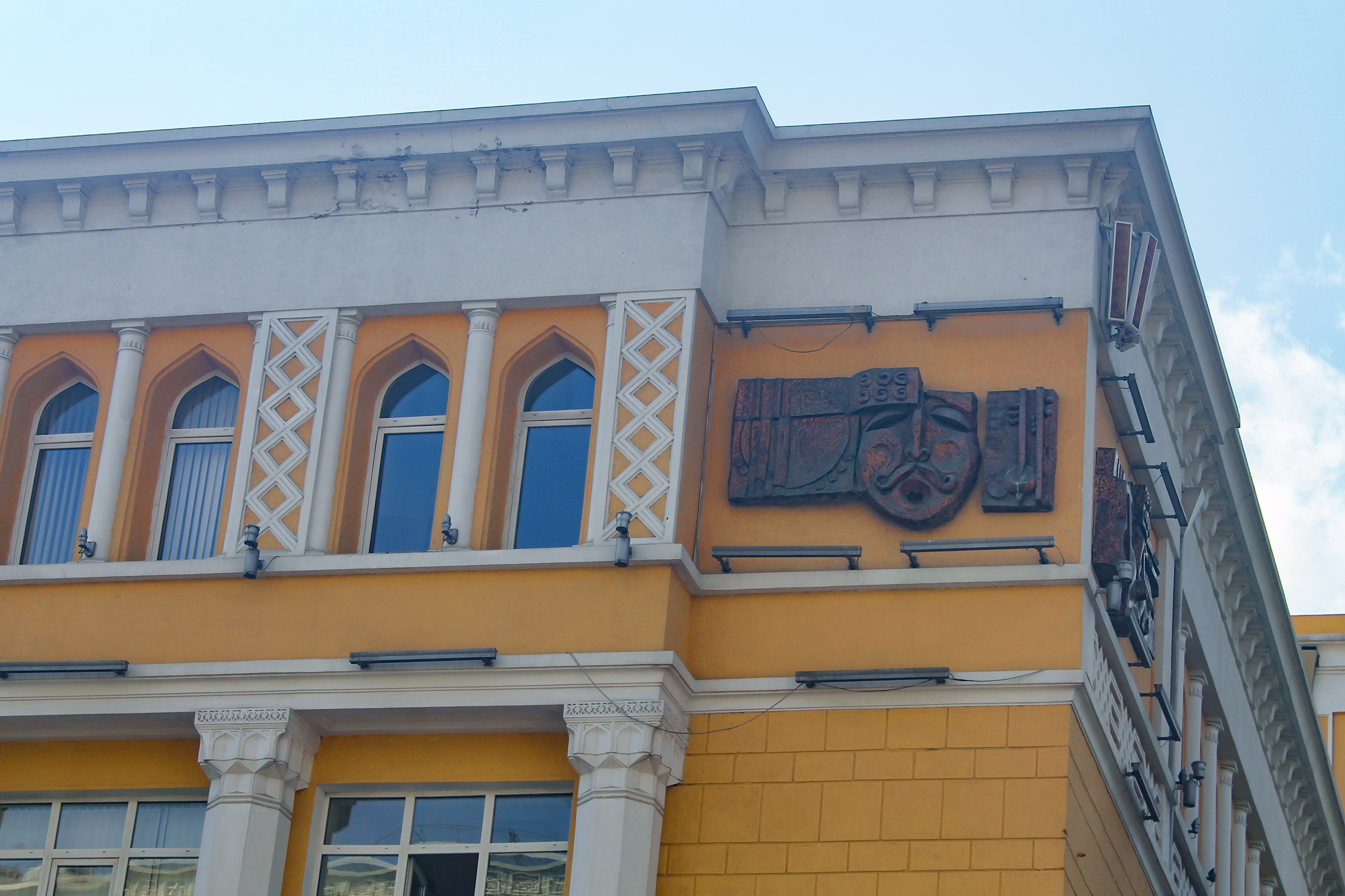
- College in 2016
- Interactive map of the Asaf Zeynally Music School in Baku area

General information
- Location: Baku, Azerbaijan
- Coordinates: 40°22′37″N 49°50′47″E
- Completed: 1916

The Baku Musical College (now the Azerbaijan National Conservatory Music College) is a state college of professional secondary education in Baku and one of the leading secondary musical schools of Azerbaijan.

== General information ==
Asaf Zeynalli Baku College of Music is a four-year special secondary school. About 1,400 students study and 400 pedagogues teach there. More than 8,000 musical personnel studied in this college since its foundation. Nazim Kazimov, "Honored Art Worker of Azerbaijan" is the chairman of the college.

== History ==
In 1885, Antonina Yermolayeva, alumni of the Moscow Conservatory, opened a private music school with the support of her sisters Yelizaveta and Yevgeniya. Antonina Yermolayeva became director of the school. Musical classes under the Baku department of the "Musical Union of Russia" were opened on the basis of this school in 1901. Antonina Yermolayeva was in charge of them too. Education in these classes was professional. In 1916, musical courses were transformed into a musical school. Pedagogical staff of the school mainly consisted of alumni of Russian conservatoires. Education was based on the curriculum which was accepted in Saint Petersburg and Moscow, in the beginning of the 19th century. In, 1922, Uzeyir Hajibeyov, eminent Azerbaijani composer, led the school. New faculties, where foundation of theory and play on Eastern instruments was also taught along with the European instruments, were opened in time of Uzeyir Hajibeyov's direction (1922-1926 and 1939–1941). In 1953, the school was named after Asaf Zeynally, an Azerbaijani composer and pedagogue.

== Famous alumni ==
- Khan Shushinski
- Asaf Zeynally
- Said Rustamov
- Sabina Babayeva
- Ahmad Bakikhanov
- Muslim Magomayev
- Zeynab Khanlarova
- Alim Qasimov
- Lutfiyar Imanov
- Valentin Jenevskiy

== See also ==
- Sabina Ilyasova
