= Jovdat Hajiyev =

Jovdat Hajiyev Cövdət Hacıyev
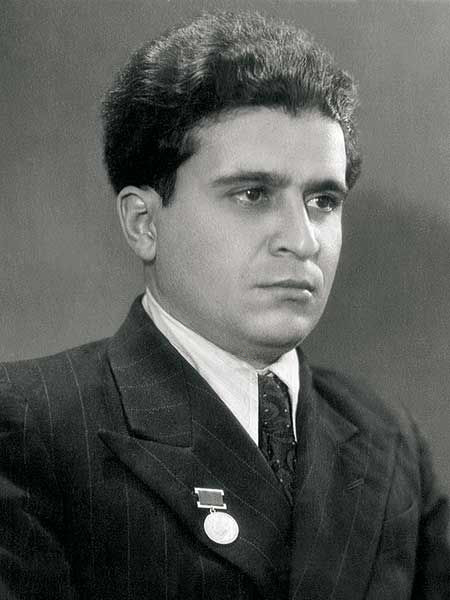

Background information
- Born: June 5, 1917; Shaki, Azerbaijan
- Died: January 18, 2002 (aged 84) Baku, Azerbaijan
- Genres: Symphony; Opera

Ahmad Jovdat Ismayil oglu Hajiyev (Azerbaijani: Əhməd-Cövdət İsmayıl oğlu Hacıyev / Әһмәд-Ҹөвдәт Исмајыл оғлу Һаҹыјев, Azerbaijani pronunciation: [æhˈmæt d͡ʒœvˈdæt isˈmɑjəl ɔˈɣlu hɑˈd͡ʒəjɪf], June 18, 1917 - January 18, 2002) was one of the major Azerbaijani composers of the Soviet period. He is remembered for his monumental orchestral works, having been the first Azerbaijani to compose a symphony (1936). He studied under Azerbaijan's Founder of Composed Music, Uzeyir Hajibeyov and under Russian composer Dmitri Shostakovich.

== Early life ==
Hajiyev was born in Shaki (then Nukha), a town in the foothills of the Caucasus Mountains in northwestern Azerbaijan. From an early age, he was deeply influenced by the traditional music of folk songs, ashug music (folk minstrel) and mugham (modal music).

In 1924, his family moved to Baku. In 1935, he enrolled in the theoretical composition faculty at Baku Conservatory, studying under Uzeyir Hajibeyov and the Latvian-born Leopold Rudolf, a student of Sergei Taneyev. The following year, Hajiyev composed his single movement "Symphony No. 1", the first symphonic piece ever written by an Azerbaijani composer. This work enabled him to enter Moscow Conservatory in 1938.

In Moscow, World War II interrupted his studies and he had to return to Baku.

== Career ==
After the war, Hajiyev and fellow student Gara Garayev (1918-1982) returned to Moscow and were profoundly influenced by composer Shostakovich. Hajiyev completed "Symphony No. 3" to graduate in 1947.

During his lifetime, Hajiyev composed eight symphonic works plus the heroic-patriotic opera "Vatan" (Motherland), which he wrote with Gara Garayev in 1944. After the opera's premiere in May 1945, Hajiyev and Garayev were awarded the prestigious Stalin Prize. Hajiyev won a second Stalin Prize in 1952, for his symphonic poem "For Peace".

Hajiyev served briefly as Artistic Director of the Baku Philharmonic Orchestra (1947–48) and was appointed to the staff of the Azerbaijan State Conservatory. He later served as the Conservatory's Rector (1957-1969) and in 1963 was appointed Professor of Composition. He went on to teach at the Conservatory for more than four decades. His students include well-known musicians such as Agshin Alizade, Dadash Dadashov and song composers Eldar Mansurov and Javanshir Guliyev.

It is for his contribution to the development of the symphony in Azerbaijan that Hajiyev will best be remembered. It was to this genre that Hajiyev returned with renewed inspiration in the 1990s, producing a number of works influenced by contemporary events. His last symphonic work entitled, "January 20", composed in 1991, was dedicated to the victims of Black January (1990), when Soviet troops and tanks killed hundreds of Baku civilians.

In 1997, President Heydar Aliyev bestowed upon Hajiyev Azerbaijan's highest recognition, the "Azerbaijan Order of Glory" on the occasion of his 80th Jubilee, commemorating "60 long years of fruitful work which is highly appreciated by the nation and the State". In Aliyev's official citation for this award, Hajiyev was praised as a "well-known composer, innovator, pedagogue, well-known public figure and model for the new generation of musicians." His music was commended for its "deep context, spirit of citizenship and high level of elegance."

== Personal life ==
Jovdat Hajiyev was married to Amina Dilbazi, well-known Azeri ballet-master and folk music dancer. Their two sons, Ismayil Hajiyev and Telman Hajiyev are both composers.
