= Niyazi =

Tarif Niyazi Lyricist and composer (1912-1984)

Niyazi Hajibeyov Niyazi Hacıbəyov
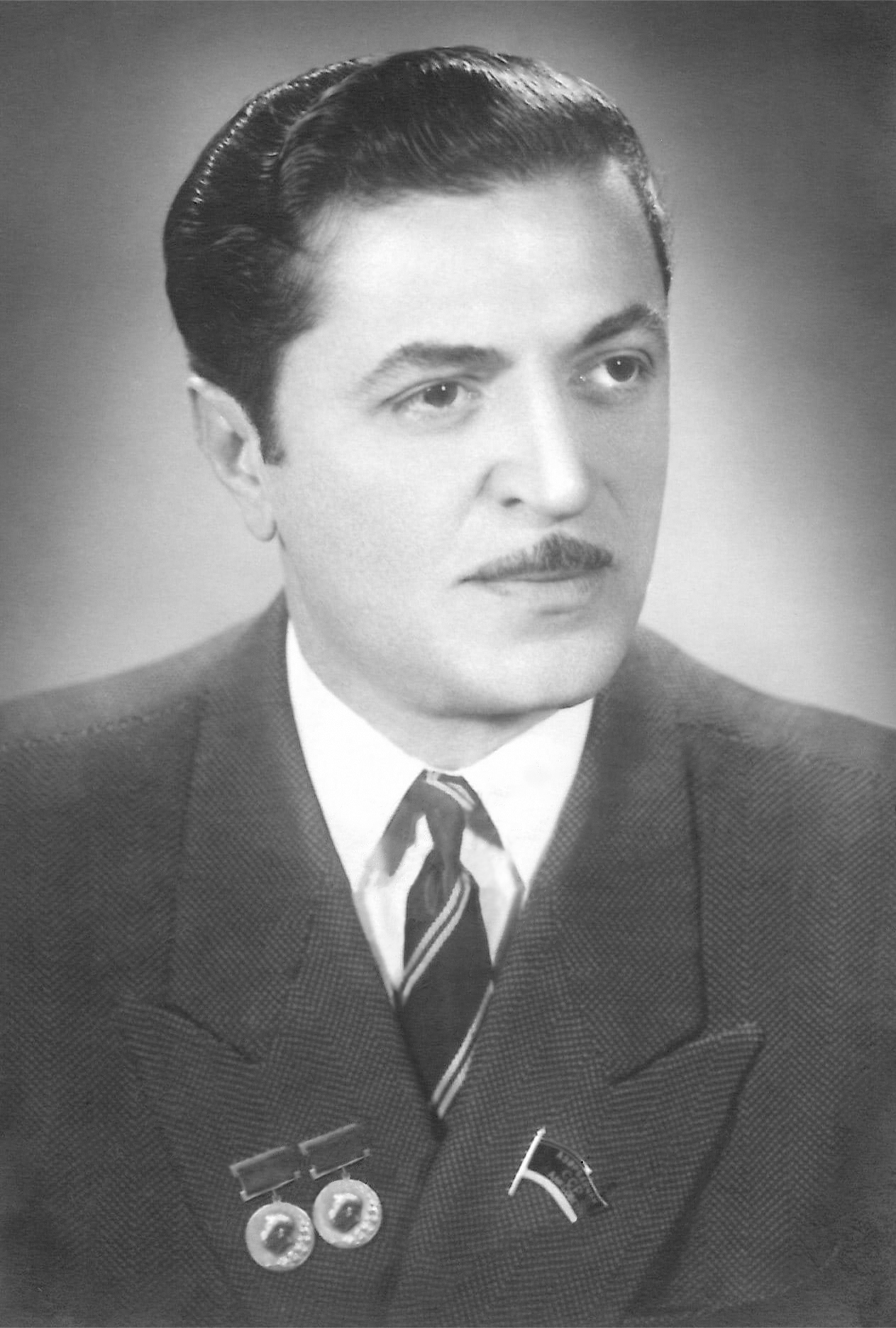

Background information
- Also known as: Maestro Niyazi; Nijazi Zul'fugarovich Tagi-zade-Hajibeyov
- Born: Niyazi Hajibeyli; August 20, 1912; Tiflis, Russian Empire
- Died: August 2, 1984 (aged 71) Baku, Azerbaijan SSR, Soviet Union
- Genres: Classical, opera
- Occupations: Composer, conductor
- Years active: 1934–1984

Niyazi Zulfugar oghlu Taghizade Hajibeyov (Azerbaijani: Niyazi Zülfüqar bəy oğlu Hacıbəyov; 20 August 1912 – 2 August 1984) was a Soviet and Azerbaijani conductor and composer. People's Artist of the USSR (1959) and Hero of Socialist Labour (1982).

== Biography ==
Niyazi was born on August 20, 1912, in Tbilisi in a family of prominent Shusha musicians. His father was the composer Zulfugar Hajibeyov. He is the nephew of Uzeyir Hajibeyov, who is recognized as the father of Azerbaijani classical music. He played the violin in "Qırmızı Kadet" Turkish military orchestra in 1921. He studied at the Gnessin Music School in Moscow in 1925-1926. In 1929-30 he studied at the Central Musical Technical School in Leningrad, but dropped out due to health problems. He returned to Baku in 1931. Soon after, he was sent to Dagestan, where he met his future wife Hajar Khanum. Her family did not approve of the marriage, so she and Niyazi ran away and married in secret. His love for his wife motivated him to produce most of his masterpieces.

== Works ==
Niyazi conducted many of the major symphony orchestras in Prague, Berlin, Budapest, Bucharest, New York, Paris, Istanbul, London, Tehran, Beijing and Ulan-Bator and played an important role in making the Azeri classical music known to the world.

Niyazi was also a talented composer. Building upon the traditions of Uzeyir Hajibeyov, he splendidly synthesized the traditional Azeri folk songs and mugham with western classical symphonic music. Niyazi's most significant works include the opera "Khosrow and Shirin" (1942), and the ballet "Chitra" (1960). His symphonic mugham "Rast" achieved worldwide popularity and was included in the repertoire of many symphony orchestras around the world.

Niyazi was the conductor and music director of the Azerbaijan State Symphony orchestra for 46 years, from 1938 to his death. He died on August 2, 1984.

Niyazi was honored as the People's Artist of the USSR (1959) and received the Stalin Prize (1951, 1952) and Hero of Socialist Labour (1982).

== See also ==
- List of People's Artistes of the Azerbaijan SSR
- House-Museum of Niyazi
