= List of mugham artists =

Mugham is a form of Azerbaijani traditional music and comes in a variety of forms. It is usually performed by a singer or khananda, accompanied by an ensemble, often a trio of instruments including the tar, kamancha, and daf (drum).

Mugham artists and musicians, including khananda and instrumentalists, are listed below by the first letter in their last name (not including the words "a", "an", or "the"). If you see notice a significant artist that is missing from this page, please start a page for them before adding them to this list.

== A ==
- Aghakhan Abdullayev
- Habil Aliyev, kamancha performer
- Malakkhanim Ayyubova

== B ==
- Arif Babayev

== G ==
- Sara Gadimova
- Jabbar Garyagdyoglu
- Alim Gasimov

== H ==
- Hajibaba Huseynov

== I ==
- Mansum Ibrahimov

== J ==
- Janali Akbarov

== M ==
- Yagub Mammadov
- Rubaba Muradova

== R ==
- Gadir Rustamov

== S ==
- Khan Shushinski
- Seyid Shushinski

== Z ==
- Abdulbagi Zulalov (Bulbuljan)
