= List of Azerbaijani musicians =

This is a list of Azerbaijani musicians and musical groups.

== Ashiq music ==
- Maryam Akhondy

== Azerbaijani folk / instrumental ==
- Nairuhi Alaverdyan
- Habil Aliyev
- Gulara Aliyeva
- Kamil Jalilov
- Bahram Mansurov
- Gurban Pirimov
- Sadigjan
- Alihan Samedov

== Classical ==
=== Azerbaijani classical / traditional ===
- Rashid Behbudov
- Şövkət Ələkbərova
- Hasan Enami Olia
- Flora Karimova
- Zeynab Khanlarova

=== Composers ===
- Fikret Amirov
- Gara Garayev
- Tofig Guliyev
- Soltan Hajibeyov
- Uzeyir Hajibeyov
- Jovdat Hajiyev
- Rauf Hajiyev
- Jahangir Jahangirov
- Arif Malikov
- Eldar Mansurov
- Said Rustamov
- Ali Salimi
- Asya Sultanova

=== Western classical / Azerbaijani symphonic ===
- Azerbaijan State Choir Capella
- Sona Aslanova
- Huseyngulu Sarabski

== Hip hop ==
- Chingiz Mustafayev
- Dayirman
- H.O.S.T.
- Huseyn Derya
- Miri Yusif
- Elşad Xose
- Murad Arif

== Jazz ==
- Rafig Babayev
- Amina Figarova
- Salman Gambarov
- Aziza Mustafa Zadeh
- Vagif Mustafazadeh
- Shahin Novrasli
- Isfar Sarabski
- Rain Sultanov

== Meykhana ==
- Aghasalim Childagh

== Mugham ==
- Jabbar Garyagdyoglu
- Seyid Shushinski
- Khan Shushinski
- Hajibaba Huseynov
- Aghakhan Abdullayev
- Arif Babayev
- Rubaba Muradova
- Janali Akbarov
- Alim Qasimov
- Nezaket Memmedova

== Pop ==
- Bulbul (Murtuza Mammadov)
- Rashid Behbudov
- Lutfiyar Imanov
- Röya
- Aygün Kazımova
- Safura Alizadeh
- Aisel
- Muslim Magomayev

== Rock ==
- Coldünya
- Unformal
- Yuxu

== See also ==
- Music of Azerbaijan
- Mugham
- Meykhana
- Azerbaijani hip hop
