= Golden Autumn-69 =

Golden autumn-69 Azerbaijani: Qızıl payız-69
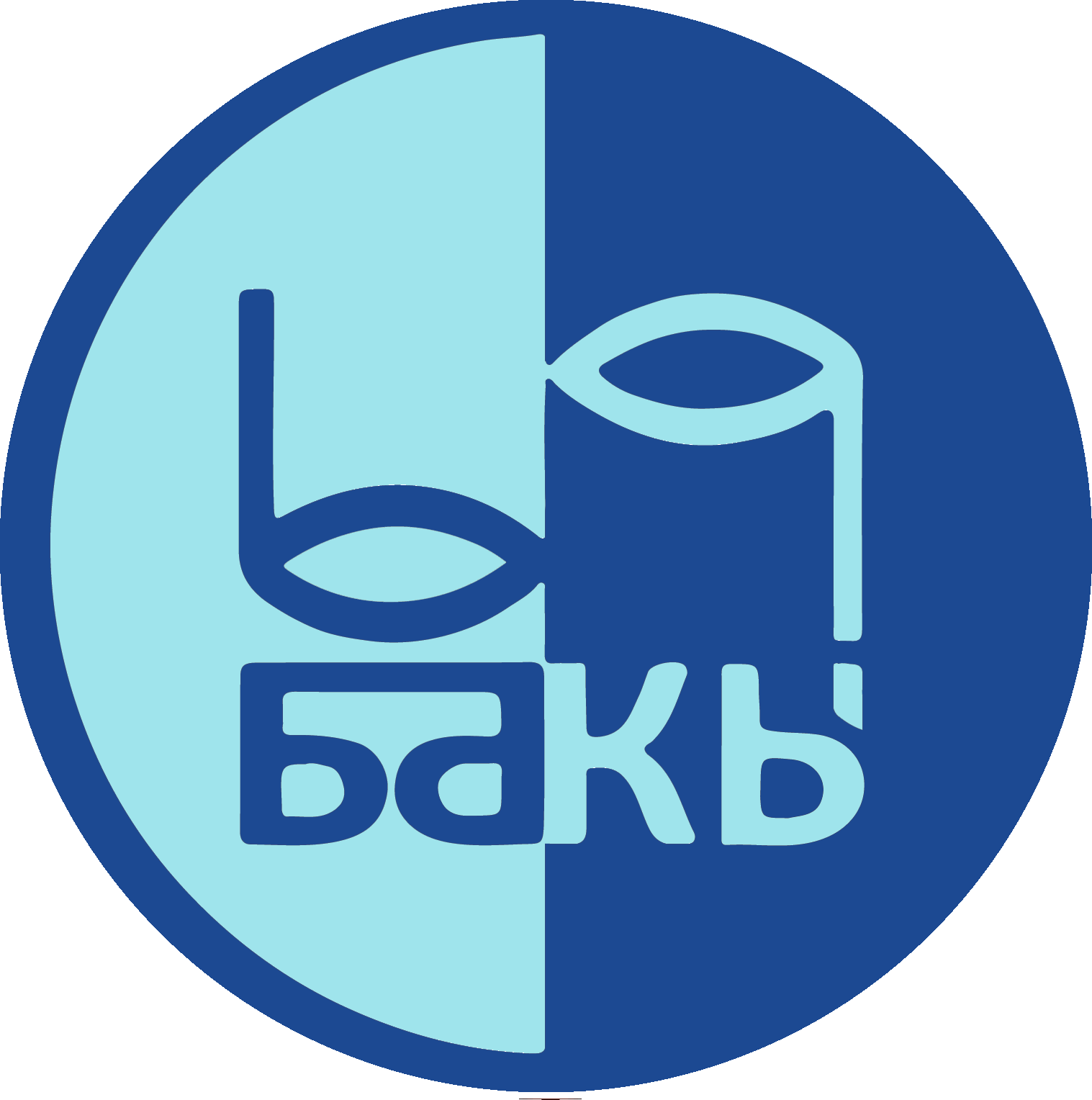
- Logo of the week of the festival
- Genre: Music festival
- Begins: October 23, 1969
- Ends: October 29, 1969
- Locations: Baku Sports Palace, Baku
- Country: Azerbaijan SSR

Golden Autumn-69 (Azerbaijani: Qızıl Payız-69) was a musical week held on October 23–29, 1969 in the Palace of Hand Games of Baku in pop, mugham and jazz genres. The festival was held by the All-Union Communist Youth Union of Lenin and the Culture Department of the Baku City Executive Committee.

In the late 1960s and early 1970s, various song and rock competitions were held in Baku. "Golden Autumn-69" was the first of the "Golden Autumn" festivals and included the previous Baku music festivals. It was considered more successful than its predecessors, both in terms of the number of viewers and the level of professionalism of the performers. Thus, more than 400 members of the artistic self-activity association participated in the festival, most of them were professional musicians. The number of spectators was tens of thousands.

The program of the concert week included contests on popular music genres of that time in Azerbaijan — pop song, mugham and jazz music performers' contests. They were called "Estrada-69", "Mugam-69" and "Jazz-69", respectively, and lasted two days each. The winners of each competition were named "festival laureate" and awarded with first, second and third class diplomas.

In preparation for the next "Golden Autumn-71" festival, in 1970, inter-university competitions "AZI-1970", "AQU-51" were held in Baku.

== Estrada-69 ==
The III Baku festival of pop songs "Estrada-69" was held on October 23 and 24, 1969. About thirty singers from thirteen collectives of Baku city fought to win this festival. The jury of the competition included Rauf Atakishiyev, Jabir Novruz, Ogtay Kazimov, Leonid Weinstein, Vagif Mustafazadeh, Rafig Babayev and others, with the chairman of the Azerbaijan SSR honored artist, composer Zakir Bagirov.

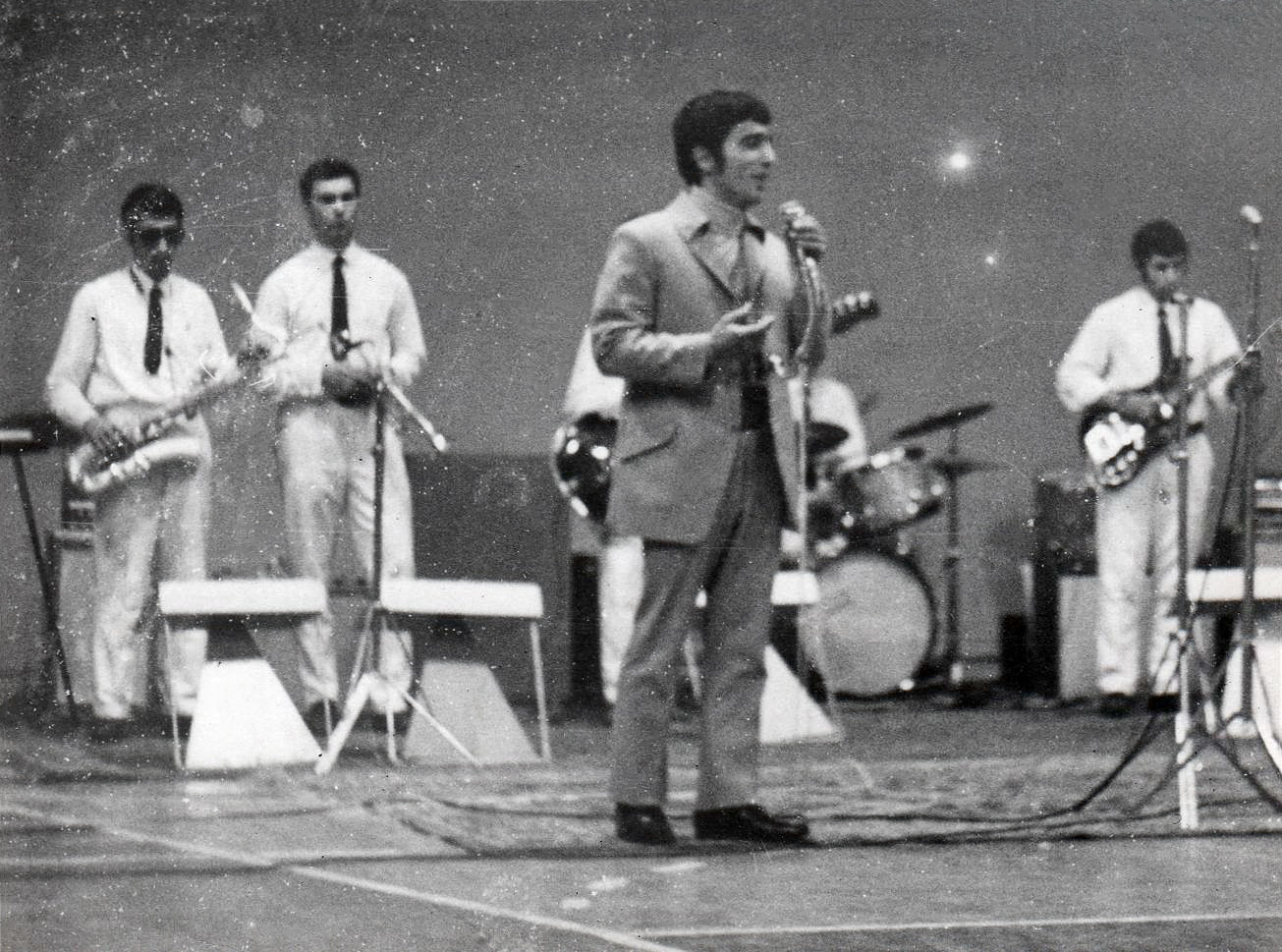
"Qara Qayalar" group at the Golden Autumn-69 festival. Soloist – Gasim Khalilov.

"Express-118", "3+2", "Melody", "Minor", "Цвет" (English: Colour), "Gamma", "Mashal", "Odlar", "Sun", "Black Rocks", "Ritm" and other groups had participated in the festival. Most of the vocalists were participating in the show for the first time. Compositions composed by Soviet, Azerbaijani and foreign composers were performed here in Azerbaijani, Russian, English and Persian.

On the first day of the festival, only new songs by Azerbaijani composers were performed. In addition to the songs of Tofig Babayev and Khayyam Mirzazade, as well as the songs of previous festival winners Eldar Behbudzade and Javanshir Zeynalli, many songs were presented by amateur authors and a total of 25 new songs were performed at the competition.

On that day, composer Ogtay Kazimov wrote to the words of poet Jabir Novruz "O life, what are you strange?!" The song was performed by the international vocal ensemble - Yen Ruda and Pris Kote, students of the GDR studying in Baku, Radi Fernandes from Cuba and Sedim Melum Eldaim from Algeria. Vagif Huseynov, who came from Leningrad, played a song dedicated to Baku with his guitar. Later, the "Odlar" instrumental ensemble performed the Azerbaijani folk song "Evlari var khana-khana".

In the continuation of the concert, "Gunesh" of repair and mechanical plant named after 26 Baku Commissioners, "Gamma" of Ilyich oilmen's culture palace, "Melody" of Baku city veterans' home and other collectives performed. Singer Emin Babayev, a student of the Azerbaijan State Conservatory, and young composers Eldar Rustamov (Said Rustamov's son), Eldar Behbudov, Eldar Bagirov, and Tunzale Kahramanova were among the pop singers. Guests from the regions of Azerbaijan and neighboring countries also participated in the event.

Also at the festival were the performances of the vocal-instrumental ensemble "Цвет" (English: Colour) of the Designing Institute of Azerbaijan State Oil Enterprises, the symphonic jazz of the Azerbaijan State Institute of National Economy named after D. Bunyadzade, the "Mashal" ensemble, singers Bijan Alizade, Ismayil Abdullahi and others. Bijan Alizadeh, the soloist of Mashal group, performed his song.

The first day of the third Baku Pop Song Festival, included in the program of the "Golden Autumn" music week at the Palace of Hand Games, ended late at night. The entire grandstand here was completely full. 17 bands from Baku performed on the first day of the festival. This festival was considered more successful than its predecessors both in terms of the number of spectators and the level of professionalism of the performer.

On October 24, the student of the Azerbaijan Polytechnic Institute and the soloist of the "Rhythm" group Elmar Muradov performed the song "Bəri bax" (English: Look here). That night, Javanshir Zeynalli from the "3+2" ensemble sang the Azerbaijani folk song "Evləri var xana-xana", and Bijan Alizadeh, the soloist of the "Mashal" ensemble, sang the Iranian song "Bahar gəldi". In addition, the song "Ay bəri bax" (English: Hey, look here) was played with a new tune at the concert. Eldar Behbudzade's song "Khazar" was also performed.

Sailors and performers from the Officers' House also took part in the festival. Among them, 19-year-old soloist Fazil Mammadov appeared on stage in a sailor's uniform and sang a song from the movie "Captain Grant's Children" and a song by Khayyam Mirzazadeh.

== Mugham-69 ==
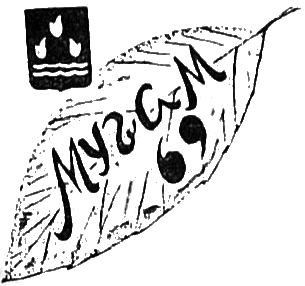
Logo of the "Mugham-69" music festival

The next stage of the festival — "Mugam-69" was held on October 25 and 26, where amateur and well-known musicians from Shusha, Aghdam and Kirovabad took part in addition to Baku. The competition of mugham singers was judged by a jury consisting of Azerbaijani singer Khan Shushinski, people's artist of the republic Sara Gadimova, honored artist Sahib Shukurov, Hajibaba Huseynov, composer-teacher Hajibaba Hasanov, candidate of philology Vali Mammadov and others.

The first day of the "Mugam-69" festival opened with "Bayati-Shiraz". Mugam was performed by Tofig Zeynalov on the tar. After him, Elmira Aliyeva, a student of the Music School named after Asaf Zeynalli, from Baku sang "Mirza Huseyn segah", Janali Akbarov "Heyrati", Mammadali Mammadov "Rast", and Jafargulu Jafarguliyev "Bayati-Shiraz". "Rahab" mugam was performed by three brothers from Maştağa - Ismayil, Sabir and Balash Alakbarov. Among them, Ismayil, a graduate of the mugham class of the Baku music school named after A. Zeynalli and the director of the Bulbula culture house at that time, accompanied Balash on the tar, and Sabir on the kamancha. Together they performed "Rahab" mugham, while Sabir and another performer on the tar played solo and "Orta Mahur" mugham. Khasay Garvandli from Kirovabad also read "Mirza Huseyn segahi".

Singer Suleyman Agayev and kamancha player Kheyrulla Karimov performed "Chahargah" from among the youth. At the end of the first day, Tamilla Mammadova sang "Qatar" mugham accompanied by the ensemble. Tamilla Mammadova, the author of several works and symphonic compositions, together with Firidun Huseynzade, was the leader of the instrumental ensemble of Azerbaijan State University named after S. M. Kirov "Shalala".

The second day of the mugham festival started with "Kharij sigah" performed by Sidgi Mustafayev, head of the Taravat Folk Instrument Ensemble of Balakhani Culture House. Lumu Bayramova, a member of the House of Culture named after Uzeyir Hajibeyov, performed "Sigah" mugam.

The "Golden Autumn" festival was attended by musicians from Darbend - honored artist of the Dagestan MSSR, singer Duriya Rahimova, Verzant Mahammadova, honored cultural worker of the Dagestan MSSR tarzan Sadi Zamanov and others. Dagestan Azerbaijanis performed mughams in the Azerbaijani language. Duriya Rahmanova sang the music of Lezgi, Qumug, Dargin, Avar and other peoples, as well as "Sigah" mugham. Tarzan Sadi Zamanov sang "Jahargah" mugham. Agha Rustamov sang "Rast" mugam accompanied by the ensemble of folk instruments led by tarzan Sadi Zamanov. He chose the ghazals from Aliagha Vahid.

Then the amateur singer Abbasgulu Safarov performed the mugham "Bayati-Shiraz" with Fuzuli's lyrics. His performance was flawed. Two female singers who took part in the competition - Lumu Bayramova and Honored Artist of the Dagestan MSSR Duriya Rahimova sang "Mirzahuseyn sigah". Tahir Guliyev performed "Shustar" mugam on kamanche. In addition, Tahir Aliyev recited "Jahargah" mugham. At the end of the concert, Baba Mirzayev, the soloist of the Azerbaijan State Philharmonic named after M. Magomayev, finished the "Qatar" mugham with jingling bells.

On October 27, the "Mugam-69" festival was completed in the Palace of Hand Games. In general, 24 singers and musicians participated in the festival during two days. 6 of them were awarded the title of "laureate of the festival".

== Jazz-69 ==
The last stage of the "Golden Autumn" festival — the III Baku jazz music festival "Jazz-69" was held on October 27 and 28. Apart from Baku, jazz groups from Moscow, Leningrad, Novosibirsk, Tallinn and Tbilisi took part here. Baku was represented by the Rafiq Babayev quartet, the "RD" quartet, the "Caucasus" trio led by Vagif Mustafazadeh and other groups.

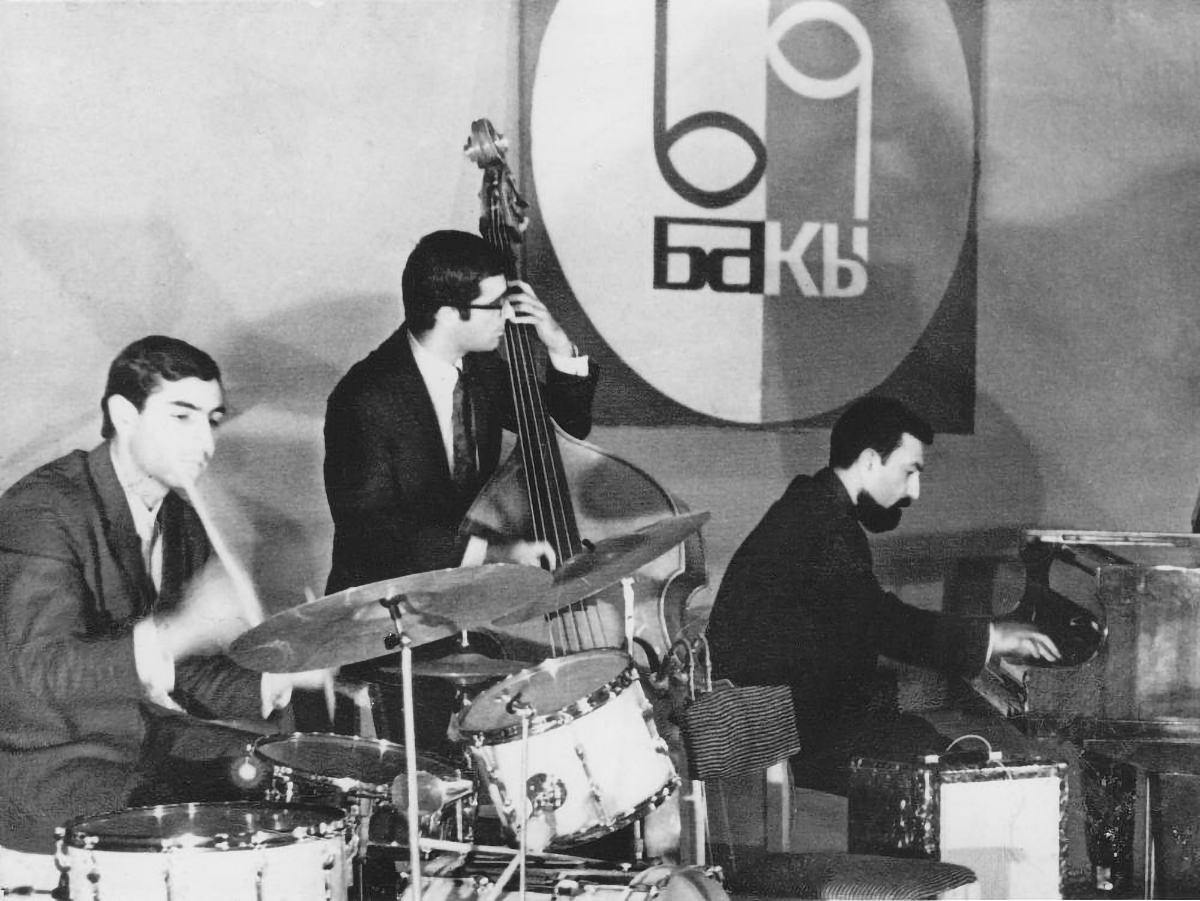
The "Caucasus" trio led by Vagif Mustafazadeh performed at the "Golden Autumn-69" festival.

The performances of the jazz ensembles were evaluated by the jury consisting of chairman Khayyam Mirzazade, people's artists of Azerbaijan SSR Tofig Guliyev, Rauf Hajiyev, participants of the festival - Rafig Babayev, Vagif Mustafazadeh and others.

In the first part of the concert, the dance of the "Indian beauty" from the ballet "Seven beautiful" by Gara Garayev was performed by the "Khazar" jazz quartet under the direction of Yuri Gukasov. Young people - saxophonist Yuri Gukasov, double bassist Alexander Simonyan, percussionist Valery Grigoryan and piano player Mikhail Khotyanov performed in the jazz quartet. The second piece in their performance was John Coltrane's "Ballad". They concluded their performance with "Blues" by Y. Gukasov, artistic director of the quartet. Later, under the leadership of amateur composer Alexander Kocharov, jazz trio "KM" performed Tofig Guliyev's "You are mine, I am yours", Duke Ellington's "In de melagon", Alexander Kocharov performed "Ballad of Golden Autumn", "Blues for Tatyana"

Irina Allegrova, a member of the "Express-118" ensemble, also participated in the Jazz-69 festival.

The quartet of Baku's "Dostlug" restaurant also performed at the event. This ensemble, led by trumpet player Tofig Alakbarov, performed a number of works by Azerbaijani and Soviet composers. Later, jazz quartets from Tbilisi started their performances. The leader of the ensemble was Alexander Rakviashvili, the group's guitarist was Roman Bragvadze, the double bass player was Tamaz Kurashvili, and the percussionist was Ivan Arutyunov. A melody from the movie "The Fate of American Soldiers", Anton Newell's "Who Will Replace Me" and the Russian folk song "O Children" were played by them.

At the "Golden Autumn" jazz music festival, the "Caucasus" ensemble presented four compositions to the audience and the jury, among them was the new "Festival" composition dedicated to the third Baku jazz music festival by author Vagif Mustafazade. The ensemble, led by Vagif Mustafazade, performed in a unique way, preserving the rhythms of mughams, especially "Jahargah".

The "RD" quartet led by Tofig Alakbarov and the "KM" collective from Moscow, consisting of Vladimir Sermakashev, Valeriya Baghiryan, Vladimir Kocharyan and Yuriya Tushinsky, also performed on the jazz day. "KM" collective, whose leader and saxophonist Vladimir Sermakashev performed a number of original compositions, as well as V. Sermakashev's composition "Blues" at the event. Tofig Alakbarov performed his composition "1002 night".

The "Radio-television" quartet led by Faig Suceddinov performed the composition "Icherisheher" using mugham music in its improvisation.

On the last day of the jazz festival, groups from the Georgian SSR also participated. Among them, guitarist Roman Bragvadze was the winner of the previous Baku festival. In addition, the symphojaz group led by Albert Avadyaev also performed. Members of pop-jazz ensembles were more inclined to the works of foreign composers. Songs of Azerbaijani composers were less common in the repertoire.

== Laureates ==
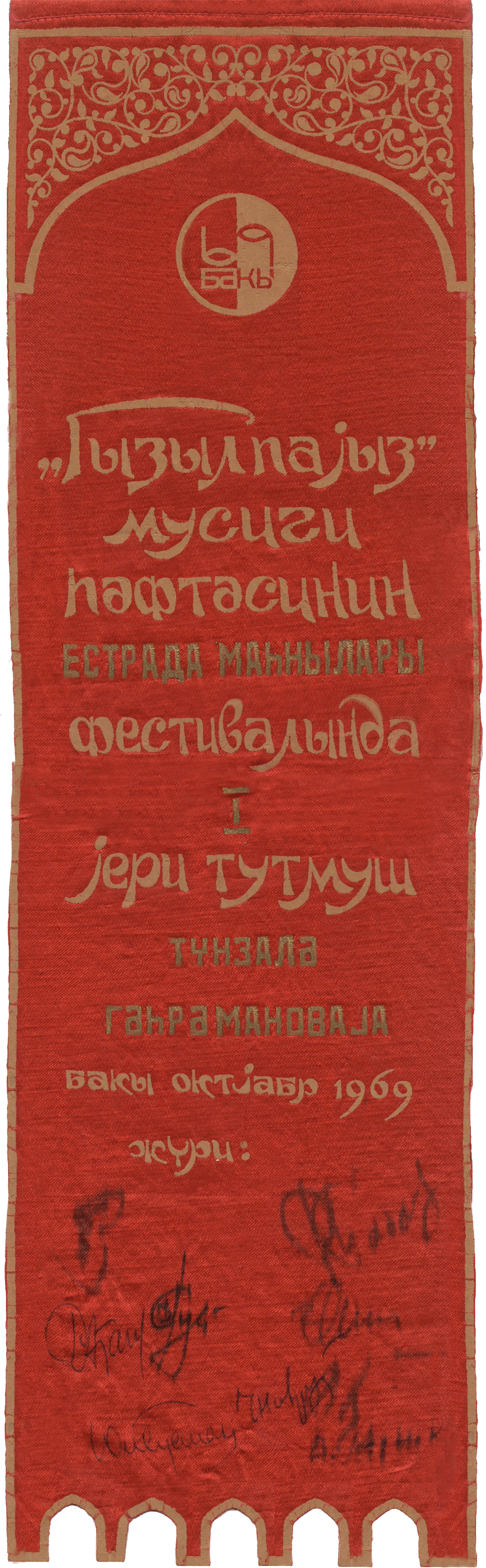
The winning tape presented to Tunzala Kahranova, who won the 1st place at the festival of pop songs of the "Golden Autumn-69" music week

People's artists of the Azerbaijan SSR Khan Shushinski and Sara Gadimova, composer, honored art worker of the Azerbaijan SSR Zakir Bagirov, secretary of the Baku Komsomol Committee Elmir Sharifov and other judges presented the awards to the festival laureates.

Young composers Eldar Behbudzadeh and Eldar Rustamov, who participated in the festival, won the title of laureate for the songs they composed and were awarded with a second degree diploma. Irina Allegrova won the laureate title for her performance of Eldar Behbudzade's song "Khazar". Georgian singer Elsa Bandzeladze and 23-year-old Eldar Rustamov, the author of the song "A and B" became laureates of the festival.

First-class diplomas of the Mugham-69 festival were presented to laureates Elmira Aliyeva and Khasay Garvendli from Kirovabad. Second degree diplomas were awarded to Jafargulu Jafarguluyev and Abdulla Azizov (for the performance of the "Segah" mugham). Agha Rustamov and Baba Mirzayev from Derbent were the laureates of third degree diplomas. Encouraging awards were given to those who excelled in performance.

The Tbilisi jazz quartet led by Aleksandr Rekviashvili, who came from foreign countries, also received the title of laureate. Baku students Tunzale Kahramanova and Eldar Bagirov were awarded first-class diplomas for the performance of pop songs. Composer Tofig Babayev was given a special award by "Baku" evening newspaper for composing a song about the city of Baku.

The laureates of the three competitions of the festival performed at the final concert held at the Baku Palace of Hand Games on October 29. 28-year-old Vagif Mustafazadeh became a three-time laureate of the festival. The piano performance in the "Caucasus" jazz trio led by Vagif and the composition "Festival" won him first prizes.
