= Bayaty-Shiraz (mode) =

Musical system in traditional mugham music

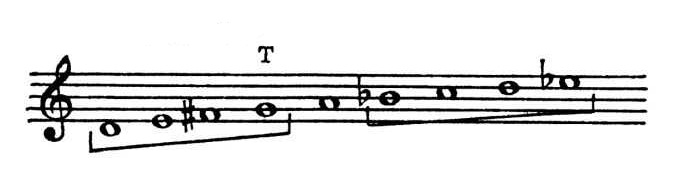
Musical scale of Bayaty-Shiraz in Azerbaijani mugham

Bayaty-Shiraz (Azerbaijani: Bayatı-Şiraz) is a musical modal system in traditional mugham music.

This is the sixth mode and consists of 1–1–0.5 tone, which is created in amalgamation of two tetra-chords with the third method. It consists of nine membranes. There passes membrane among the tetra-chords. It creates melancholic feelings at listener. Subgenres of Bayaty-Shiraz are: Bardasht, Isfahanak, Maye, Gardaniyye, Nishibi-Faraz, Bayaty-Isfahan, Khums-Ravan, high-pitched tone Bayaty-Shiraz, Abulchap, Khaveran, Huzzal, Shikasteyi-Fars, Dilruba, space.

Bayaty-Shiraz is called the “bride of the music” in the countries which are the home of the mugham. This dastgah is played in the “left” tone of the Bayaty-Shiraz.

The Azerbaijani tar player Bahram Mansurov notes that Bayaty-Shiraz, formerly known as Bayaty-Isfahan, existed as independent dastgah only in the early 19th century. M. Navab described Bayaty-Shiraz mugham as a section in the “Vuzuhul-Argam” treatise, and named the fifth of 12 mug-hams as Isfahan.

== Structure ==
Being one of the 7 main mughams of the Azerbaijani oral music, Bayaty-Shiraz has sections with the same name. "Ba-62 yati-Shiraz" and its classifications, colors and many folk songs and dances have been created on the base of Bayati-Shiraz. Composer Uzeyir Hajibeyov said that Bayaty-Shiraz mugam arouses a sense of sadness in the listeners.

In the table compiled by Mirza Faraj Rzayev, Bayati-Shiraz consisted of 17 sections and chapters: “Daramed”, “Bayati-Isfahan”, “Bayati-Shiraz”, “Abul-Chap”, “Jafariyya”, “Budashti”, “Bayati-Kurd”, “Haji Yuni”, “Gilachi, Dashti”, “Mahdi-Zerrabi”, “Qatar”, “Bayati”, “Ashiqi-Gush”, “Niiriz-Davudi” and “Huzzal”. In 1925, in the program prepared by Hajibeyov, the Bayaty-Shiraz dastgah was described as "Bayati-Isfahan" and consisted of ten sections and chapters: "Maye-Bayati-Shiraz", "Bayati-Isfahan", "Abul-chap", "Azerbaijan", “Bayaty-Kurd”, “Haji Yuni”, “Dashti”, “Qatar”, “Huzzal” and “Bayati-Shiraz.”

When comparing the Bayaty-Shiraz dastgahs in the mugham table of M. F. Rzayev and the mugham program of Uzeyir Hajibeyov, it turns out that, some sections and chapters are same. As a result of the development of Bayaty-Shiraz some sections and chapters were removed from the dastgah. Thus, some parts and chapters were cut off from the components as they did not correspond to the Bayaty-Shiraz dastgah. The subgenre of “Azerbaijan” began to be used in the footsteps of "Shahnaz" (cadence), "Bayati-Kurd" as "Nava" dastgah, in parallel as small independent "Bayati-Kurd" mugam, "Haji Yuni" as “Shur”, "Qatar" as "Mahur-hindi". The "Dashti" dastgah first existed as a branch in "Nava", and then began to be used as a small independent mugham called "Dashti".

=== Maye-Bayaty-Shiraz ===
Presently the Bayaty-Shiraz dastgah consists of 8 sections and chapters: “Bardasht”, “Maye-Bayati-Shiraz”, “Nishibi-Faraz”, “Bayati-Isfahan”, “Zil Bayat-Shiraz”, “Khavaran”, “Huzzal”, “Dulruba” and “Foot to Bayati-Shiraz” (cadence). The khananda, who sings mughams, performs the fast-paced "Nishibi-sepat" instead of "Bardasht". Some khanandas start Bayaty-Shiraz dastagh with "Maye-Bayaty-Shiraz". Some of them begin with the part of “Molevi” of "Bardasht" of Bayaty-Shiraz. The “Molevi” is followed by the Maye-Bayaty-Shiraz, one of the main sections of the dastgah. This section is the basis of the Bayaty-Shiraz dastgah.

=== Nishibi-faraz ===
After Maye-Bayati-Shiraz, "Nishibi-faraz" section is played. "Nishibi-faraz" also serves as a connecting role, which combines the "Maye-Bayati-Shiraz" and "Bayati-Isfahan" sections. The khanandas, who perform the "Bayati-Shiraz", sing "Bayati-Isfahan" after Bardasht ("Nishibi-sepaz") and "Maye-Bayati-Shiraz". At the same time "Nishibi-faraz" plays the role of transition “Sarenj” to the “Maye-Shura”.

The "Nishibi-faraz" sections of “Shur” and Bayaty-Shiraz differ from each other from melodic point of view. Thus, the "Nishibi-sepat" sections in both dastgahs have different characters and tones. The "Bayati Isfahan", the central part of the Bayati-Shiraz covers the average range of dastgah in the tessitura. Strong sounding is a prerequisite for Bayati-Isfahan's vocal and instrumental performance.

=== Bayati-Isfahan ===
After the "Bayati-Isfahan", the high-range sections are coming. These sections include “Zil Bayaty-Shiraz”, “Khaveran”, “Huzzal” and “Dulruba”. "Zil Bayaty-Shiraz" is the repetition of Maye-Bayati-Shiraz in high-range. There is also a difference here because of the change of the melodies' shades and the other character. In the "Maye-Bayaty-Shiraz" is dominated by sadness, in "Zil Bayati-Shiraz" rhythm is dominant.

=== Khaveran ===
The "Khaveran" section, which is performed after "Zil Bayati-Shiraz", was previously performed between "Shikasteyi-fars" and "Eraq" sections of the Rast dastgah. Then the Khawaran section was removed from the Rast dastgah, and it was positioned only between “Bayati-Isfahan” and “Huzzal” sections of Bayati-Shiraz. In addition, the "Khaveran" section plays a role of bridge between Bayati-Shiraz and Segah dastgahs.

=== Huzzal ===
Khaveran is followed by "Huzzal" section. This section requires khanandas a loud voice.

=== Dilruba ===
After the "Uzzal" section, “Dilruba” section (in Persian the word “dülrüba” means beautiful, favorite) is coming in a frivolous manner, which did not include Bayati-Shiraz dastgah previously.

== Azerbaijani khanandas (mugham singers) ==
The famous Azerbaijani performers of Bayaty-Shiraz are Sattarari, Agabala Agha Said, Jabbar Garyagdioglu, Dadash Muradkhanov (1858-1930), Abulhasan Khan Azer Iqbal-Soltani, Gasim Abdullayev (Zabul Gasim), Mirza Gullar, Islam Abdullaev, Seyid Shushinski, Musa Shushinski, Zulfu Adigozalov, Huseynaga Hajibababeyov, Khan Shushinski, Yavar Kalanterli, Aliovsat Sadigov (1906-1971), Mutallim Mutallimov, Sara Gadimova, Yagub Mammadov, Alibaba Mammadov, Nariman Aliyev, Eynulla Asadov, Murshud Mammadov, Aghababa Novruzov, Karakhan Behbudov, Ramiz Hacıyev, Arif Babayev, Janali Akbarov, Vahid Abdullayev, Agakhan Abdullayev, Nisa Gasimova (1954), Sahibe Ahmedova (Abbasova), Alim Gasimov, Mansum Ibrahimov, Zahid Guliyev, Maleykekhanim Eyyubova (1962), Zabit Nabizade, Maharram Hasanov, Almaz Orujova, Gulustan Aliyeva, Nuriya Huse Ynovani, Gulyaz Mammadova, Nazakat Teymurova, and Sabuhi Ibayev.

== See also ==
- Mugham
- Music of Azerbaijan
- International Mugham Center of Azerbaijan
