= Zohra Abdullayeva =

Azerbaijani singer (1952–2021)

- from a 2019 video

Background information
- Born: Zohra Abdulla gizi Abdullayeva; 18 December 1952; Shusha, Azerbaijani SSR, Soviet Union
- Died: 28 May 2021 (aged 68) Baku, Azerbaijan
- Occupation: Singer

Zohra Abdulla gizi Abdullayeva (18 December 1952 – 28 May 2021) was an Azerbaijani singer.

== Early life ==
Abdullayeva was born on 16 December 1952 in Shusha. She graduated from Azerbaijan Technological University. She received individual mugam lessons from artists such as Sara Gadimova, Abulfat Aliyev and Munavvar Kalantarli. Her first teacher was Rahila Hasanova. Islam Rzayev brought Abdullayeva to the professional stage.

== Career ==
Abdullayeva worked as a soloist of the "Lalə qızlar anasmblının" (Lala Girls Ensemble) and then as a soloist of the Azerbaijan State Philharmonic. She is known for her duets with Mammadbagir Bagirzade. She also sang folk and composer songs and mughams. She sang Azerbaijani music in thirty countries around the world. In 1985, Abdullayeva won the "İstedadlar axtarılır" (Looking for Talents) concert competition. In 2000, she was awarded a diploma at the Babylonian Festival in Baghdad.

== Personal life and death ==
Abdullayeva married at the age of 16. She had one son and two grandchildren. Her son died on 28 May 2018 from a serious illness. Abdullayeva died on 28 May 2021 after a long and serious illness.

== See also ==
Gulyanag Mammadova
