= Tukavila =

Tukavila may refer to:

- Tüklə, Azerbaijan
- Tükəvilə, Azerbaijan
