= Sara Gadimova =

Azerbaijani singer (1922–2005)

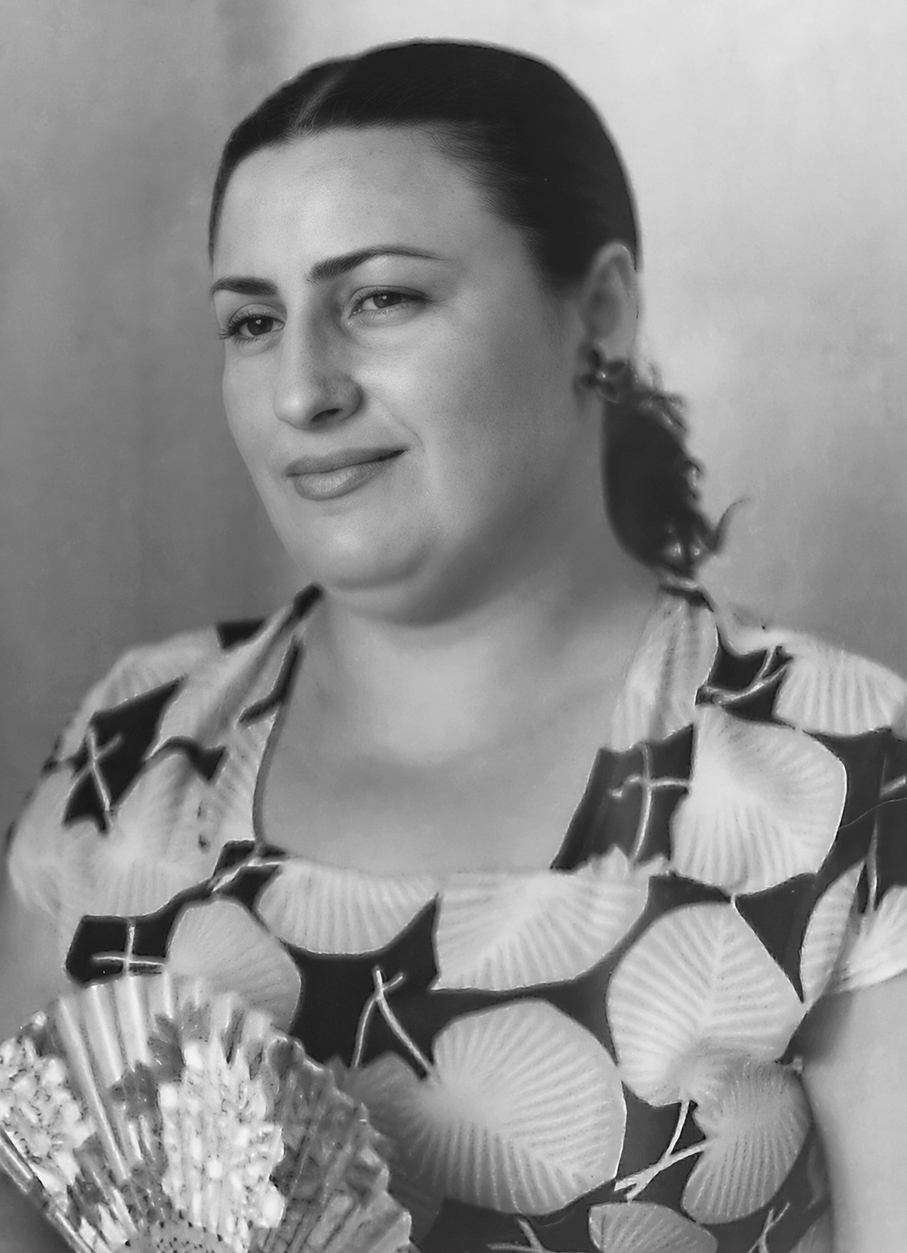
- Gadimova in the late 1950s
- Born: 31 May 1922; Baku, Azerbaijan
- Died: 12 May 2005 (aged 82)
- Occupation: Soprano singer
- Years active: 1941–2005
- Awards: Sharaf Order; Shohrat Order
- Honours: People's Artist of Azerbaijan (1954)
- Musical career
- Genres: Azerbaijani folk; mugham; opera
- Formerly of: Azerbaijan State Philharmonic Society; Azerbaijan State Academic Opera and Ballet Theater (1957–1962)

Sara Gadimova (Azerbaijani: Sara Qədimova; Russian: Сара Кадымова, 31 May 1922 – 12 May 2005) was an Azerbaijani singer who started her career as a soloist of the Azerbaijan State Philharmonic Society in 1941.

The song "Compassionate Sister", composed by Uzeyir Hajibeyov to a poem by Samad Vurgun, was read by Gadimova before the Azerbaijani soldiers on the front line in World War II. Noted particularly for her dastgāh performance, which surpassed other female dastgāh performances, she also sang Bayaty-Shiraz, Karabakh Shikastasi and other mugham varieties. She was awarded the Sharaf Order and Shohrat Order.

== Biography ==
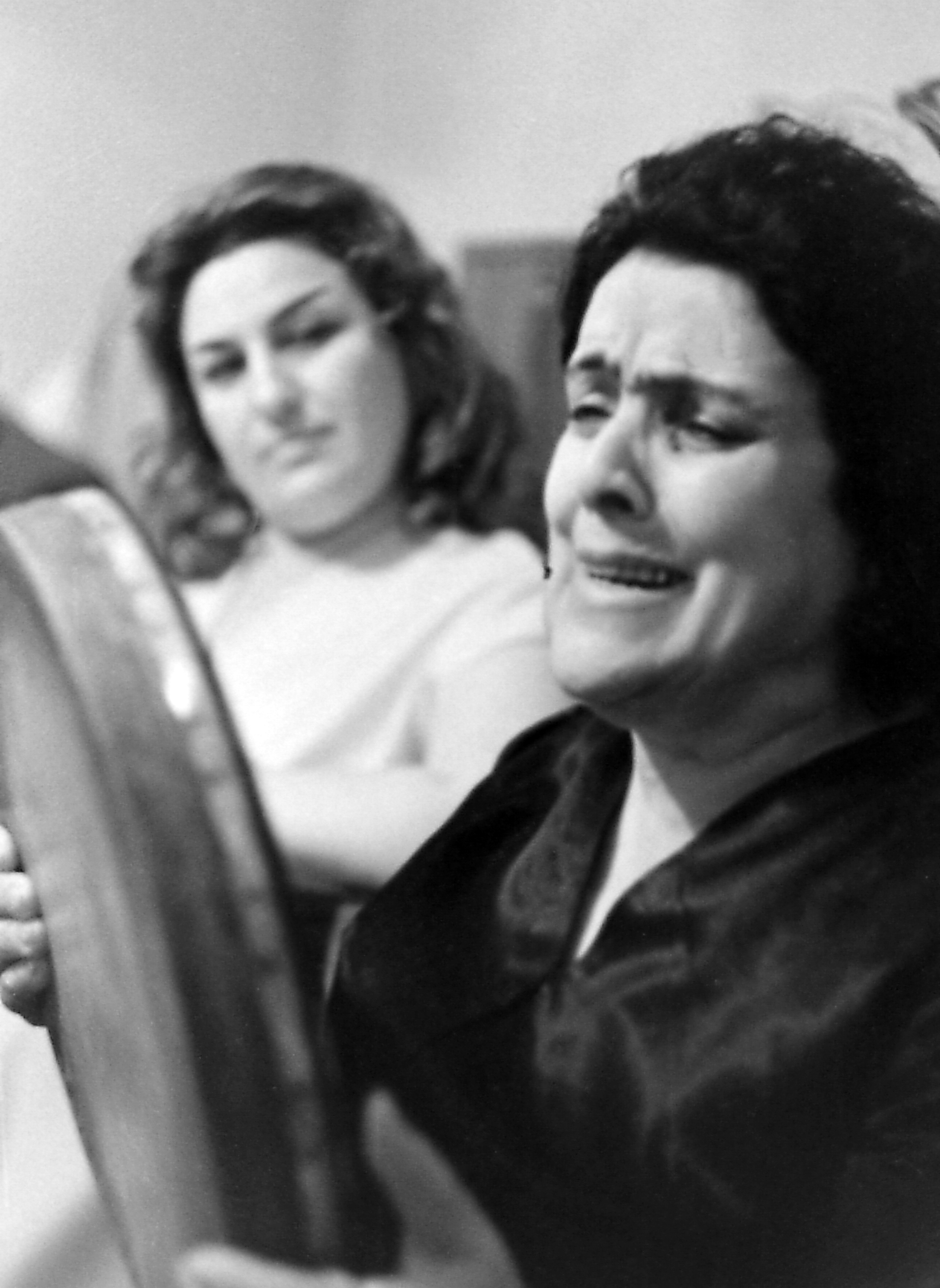
Gadimova (left) with Azerbaijan-Soviet khananda singer Yaver Kelenterli, early 1960s

Gadimova was born in Baku. Her father, Babish, hailed from the village of Gülablı but settled in Baku. Having graduated from medical school, she entered the Baku Academy of Music and completed studies there in 1941. Among her music mentors were Huseyngulu Sarabski, Khan Shushinski and Seyid Shushinski. During World War II, and later, the First Nagorno-Karabakh War, Gadimova performed patriotic songs for soldiers. At the age of 22, she married Gadir Islamzadeh, who was 24 years her senior. They eventually separated after eight years. In the 1950s, Gadimova was already a popular singer; in 1954, she was awarded the title of the People's Artist of Azerbaijan.

Her voice is a lyric-coloratric soprano. Along with being a soloist with the Azerbaijan State Philharmonic Society (from 1941), she was also a partner with the Azerbaijan State Academic Opera and Ballet Theater in 1957–1962, with whom she performed at leading parties and was remembered in paintings of Leyli and Aslı (characters whom she played) created on the opera scene. She was deeply fascinated by folk music, and performed Bayaty-Shiraz, Shur, Shahnaz, Qatar, Mahur-hindi and Foreign Seagah mughams and various Azerbaijani folk songs, which are written in golden letters. Particularly, she sang Garabagh Shikestesi, a mugham which holds a special place in the history of Azerbaijani music. She also contributed to the development of the Azerbaijani khanate school, with its deep historical roots traditions. She remained loyal to the Azerbaijani tradition of classical singing through the end of her life.

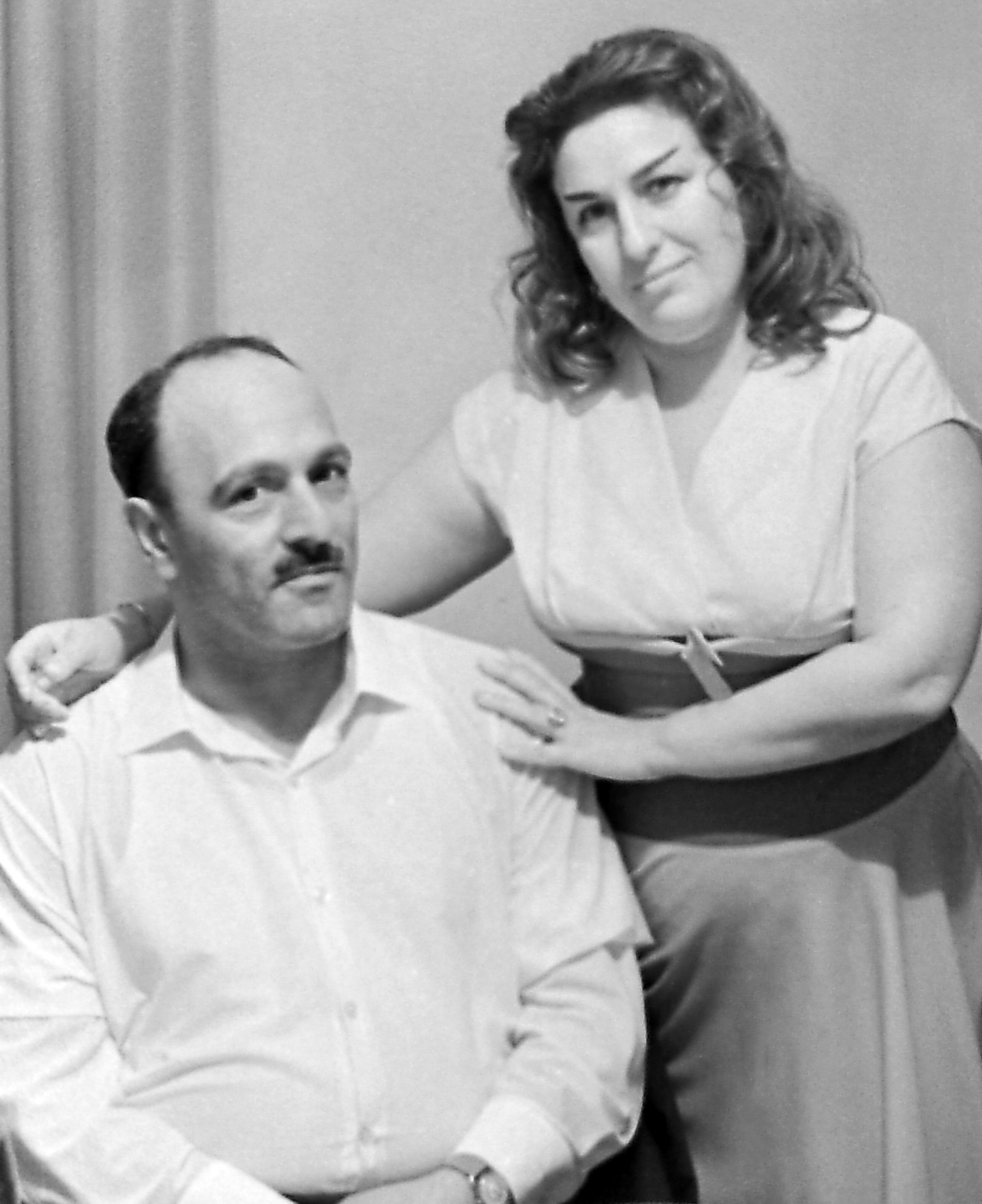
Gidimova with Azerbaijani khananda poet Hajibaba Huseynov, early 1960s

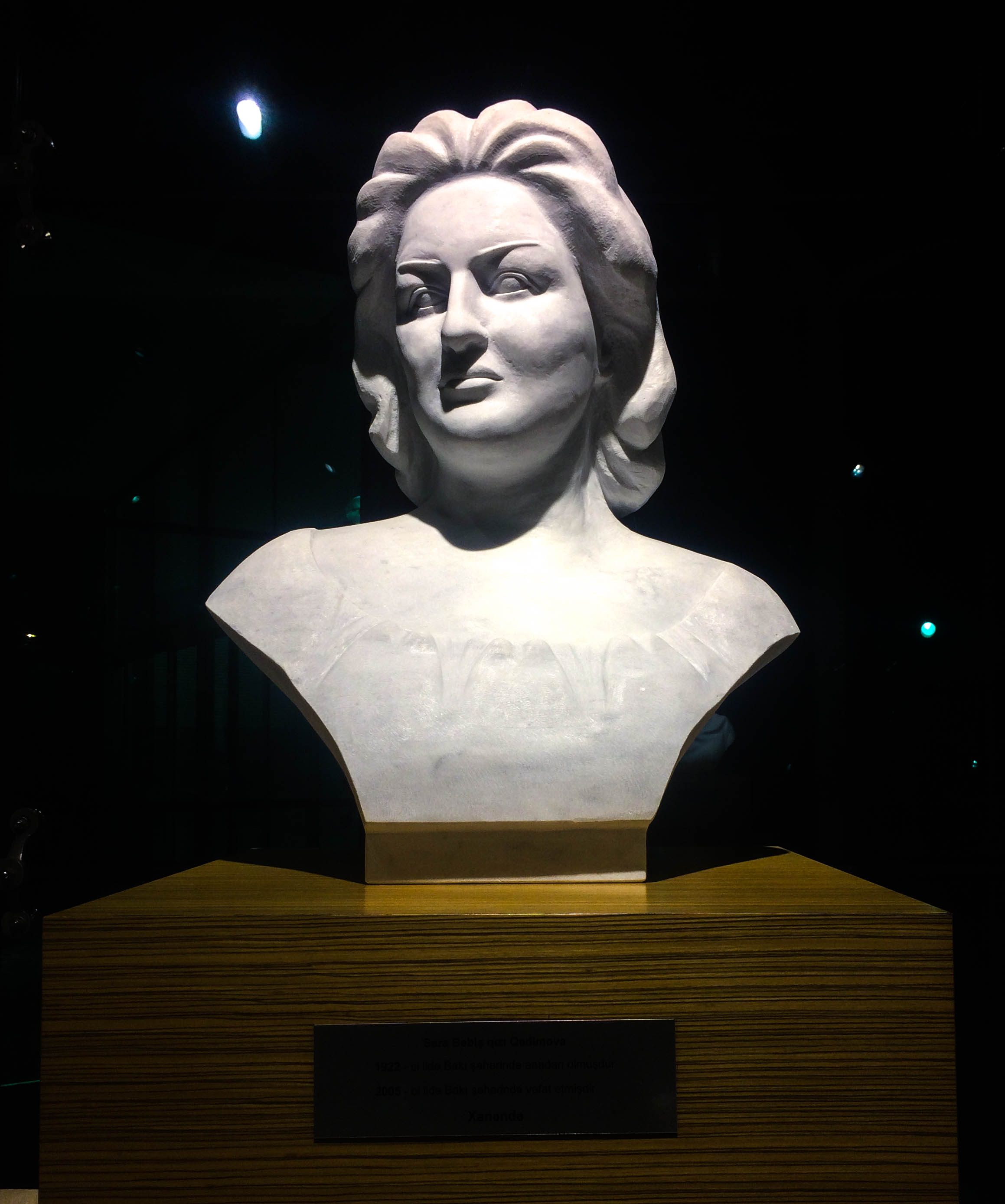
An honorary bust of Gadimova

Gadimova died on 12 May 2003, at the age of 82, after a prolonged illness, having not achieved her desire of performing Karabakh Shikastasi in the Armenian-occupied Aghdam District of Azerbaijan.

She has repeatedly represented Azerbaijan's national culture in foreign countries, having drawn Azerbaijani folk music to representatives of different nationalities, and she was deeply sympathetic to the most prestigious scenes.

== Commemoration ==
On 30 May 2007, a commemorative plaque dedicated to Gadimova was unveiled, located at 27 Uzeyir Hajibayov Street in Baku, where she lived.

== See also ==
- Gulyanag Mammadova
