= Hajibaba Huseynov =

Azerbaijani poet (1919–1993)

Hajibaba Huseynov Hacıbaba Hüseynov
- Born: 15 March 1919 Baku, Azerbaijan Democratic Republic
- Died: 24 October 1993 (aged 74) Baku, Azerbaijan
- Genres: mugham
- Occupation(s): khananda, singer
- Instrument: dayereh
- Years active: 1945–1993
- Burial place: Alley of Honor
- Citizenship: Azerbaijan Democratic Republic; Soviet Union; Azerbaijan
- Awards: People's Artist of the Azerbaijan SSR Honored Artist of the Azerbaijan SSR

Hajibaba Huseynali oghlu Huseynov (Azerbaijani: Hacıbaba Hüseynəli oğlu Hüseynov; 15 March 1919 – 24 October 1993) was an Azerbaijani khananda, poet, pedagogue. He was awarded the People's Artiste of the Azerbaijan SSR.

== Biography ==
Hajibaba Huseynov was born on 15 March 1919, in Baku. With the outbreak of the Great Patriotic War in 1941, he began to work as a lathe operator at the "Parkommuna" plant. After the end of the war in 1945, the famous singer Sara Gadimova, the sister-in-law of him, introduced Hajibaba Huseynov to the prominent pedagogue, tar player Ahmad Bakikhanov. A. Bakikhanov invited H. Huseynov to his ensemble and he worked there for three years.

In 1962–1992, Hajibaba Huseynov taught mugham at Azerbaijan State Music School named after Asaf Zeynally. Nazakat Mammadova, Gadir Rustamov, Sakhavat Mammadov, Zaur Rzayev, Teymur Mustafayev, Sabir Aliyev, Bilal Aliyev, Zabit Nabizade and others were his students.

Hajibaba Huseynov was the first performer of "Ushshag", "Husseini", "Novruzi ravanda" sections of Rast mugham and "Shah Khatai" section of other mughams. At his initiative, the "Dilruba" section of Bayaty-Shiraz mugham was added to the textbook.

The singer had started touring abroad since 1989. His first visit was to Iraq with a great musician staff. He gave concerts in Turkey (Adana) in 1990 and in Belgium (Brussels), France (Paris, Marseille, Lyon, Montpellier), Switzerland and the Netherlands for one month in 1991. His last visit was to the Islamic Republic of Iran in 1992, which lasted more than two months with a group of twelve musicians.

H. Huseynov died on 24 October 1993, in Baku. By the order of Heydar Aliyev, the singer was buried on 26 October 1993, in the First Alley of onor.

On 22 February 2019, President Ilham Aliyev signed an order to celebrate the 100th anniversary of Hajibaba Huseynov.

== Awards ==
- People's Artiste of the Azerbaijan SSR – 29 October 1990
- Honored Artist of the Azerbaijan SSR – 21 March 1989

== Literature ==
- "Һаҹыбаба Һүсејнəли оғлу Һүсејнов". Әдәбијјат гәзәти. 43 (2894). 29 October 1993.
- Hüseynov, Rafael (2017). Hacıbaba Hüseynov (in Azerbaijani). Baku: Şərq-Qərb. p. 144. ISBN 978-9952-34-361-8.
