= Janali Akbarov =

Azerbaijani folk singer (1940–2021)

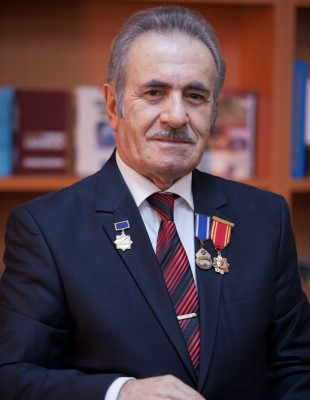

Background information
- Birth name: Canəli Əkbərov
- Born: 10 March 1940; Tukavila, Lankaran, Azerbaijani SSR, USSR
- Died: 22 October 2021 (aged 81); Baku, Azerbaijan
- Genres: Mugham; Folk
- Occupation: Musician
- Instruments: Dayereh
- Years active: 1965—2021

Janali Akbarov (Azerbaijani: Canəli Əkbərov), born Əkbərov Canəli Xanəli oğlu (10 March 1940 – 22 October 2021), was an Azerbaijani khananda folk singer. In 1992, he was awarded the title of the People's Artist of Azerbaijan. He was awarded the Order of Labor in 2020. Janali Akbarov has been awarded for his long-term efficient activity for the sake of the development of the Azerbaijani culture.

== Life and career ==
Akbarov was born on 10 March 1940 in the Tukavila village of the Lankaran region. He learned mugam from his father and studied music at the Azerbaijan State Music School in Baku.

He studied under Seyid Shushinski and Khan Shushinski. In 1965, Akbarov was a soloist of the State Philharmonic, and in 1976, he was a soloist of the State Opera and Ballet Theater. In 1992, he was awarded the title of the People's Artist of Azerbaijan.

== Awards and honors ==
- In 2002 he was awarded the Order of Glory.
- In 2020 he was awarded the Order of Labor.
- Shohrat Order
- Sharaf Order
- Labor Order (Azerbaijan)

== Discography ==
- Janali Akbarov Sings Azerbaijanian Mughams
- Classical Mugham
