= Mansurov =

Mansurov is a surname. Notable people with the surname include:

- Bahram Mansurov (1911–1985), Azerbaijani Soviet musician
- Dilshod Mansurov (born 1983), Uzbekistani sport wrestler
- Eldar Mansurov (born 1952), Azerbaijani musician, composer and songwriter
- Farid Mansurov (born 1982), Azerbaijani sport wrestler
- Fuat Mansurov (1928–2010), Russian Soviet conductor

== Meaning And background ==
Mansurov has an unknown meaning.

While there are a few cases of Mansurov being a given name, Mansurov has been the given name to 53 people in four countries thus far. It is common as a surname, having found the surname Mansurov at least 1067 times in at least 15 countries.

Mansurov may have some Russian origins seeing as the name is commonly given to Russians.
