= List of Azerbaijani opera singers =

This is a list of notable Azerbaijani opera singers, which is arranged alphabetically.

== A ==
- Abulfat Aliyev
- Ahmed Agdamski
- Sona Aslanova, soprano
- Elchin Azizov, baritone

== B ==
- Bulbul, tenor
- Behbudov Rashid, tenor

== G ==
- Fidan Gasimova, soprano
- Khuraman Gasimova

== H ==
- Gulkhar Hasanova
- Sarabski Huseyngulu, tenor

== I ==
- Lutfiyar Imanov, tenor

== M ==
- Muslim Magomayev, baritone
- Shovkat Mammadova, soprano
- Fatma Mukhtarova, mezzo-soprano
- Rubaba Muradova, mezzo-soprano

== R ==
- Hagigat Rzayeva

== S ==
- Huseyngulu Sarabski, tenor
