= Tukla =

Tukla may refer to:

- Tüklə, a village in Azerbaijan
- Tukla, Leh, a village in India
- Tukla Bagh, a village in Iran
