= Heyrati =

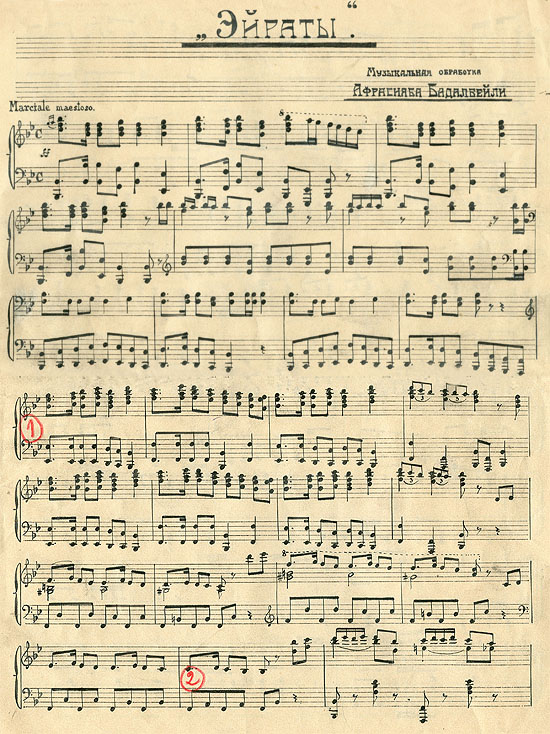
An edited version by Afrasiyab Badalbeyli

“Heyrati” (Azerbaijani: Heyratı) – is one of the rhythmic mughams of Azerbaijan. It’s performed at a key of “C rast” of “Mahur-hindi” branch. Its time signature is – 4/4. It has a vital and heroic character. Musical performance like an introduction is executed after each vocal part.

In performance of Jabbar Garyaghdioglu

In performance of Khan Shushinski

Mugham was used in “Leyli and Majnun” opera by Uzeyir Hajibeyov. Signal calls of Azerbaijani radio were based on the beginning notes of this mugham.
