= Malakkhanim Eyubova =

Azerbaijani khananda

- Born: November 5, 1962 (age 63); Shamakhi, Azerbaijan SSR
- Genres: Mugham, Azerbaijani folk music
- Occupation: singer
- Instrument: Voice
- Years active: 1979–present

Malakkhanim Eyubova (Azerbaijani: Mələkxanım Eyubova; born November 5, 1962, Shamakhi) is an Azerbaijani khananda (folk singer).

== Life ==
She attended music school to study the accordion and was a soloist in the choir under Afsar Javanshirov.

In 1979 she began studying musical comedy at the M.A. Aliyev Azerbaijan State Arts University, graduating in 1984.

She performed in countries including the United States, Germany, Australia, France, Romania, Belgium, and Russia. In 1995 she played the title role of Leyli in Uzeyir Hajibeyov's opera Leyli and Majnun at the Azerbaijan State Academic Opera and Ballet Theatre.

She recorded albums in Germany, France, and Turkey. Eyubova was awarded the title of Honored Artist and People's Artist of Azerbaijan.
