= People's Artiste of the Azerbaijan SSR =

Soviet Azerbaijan honorary title (1931–1990)

People's Artiste of the Azerbaijan SSR Azərbaycan SSR xalq artisti
- Awarded for: Theater, cinema, music fields
- Date: July 28, 1928 – February 5, 1991

The People's Artiste of the Azerbaijan SSR (Azerbaijani: Azərbaycan SSR xalq artisti, lit. 'People's Artiste of the Azerbaijan SSR') was an honorary title awarded from 1931 to 1991 (and active from 1928 to 1991), it was granted to artistes of the Azerbaijan SSR for their contributions to the development of Azerbaijani culture in the fields of theater, cinema, music. This award was succeeded by the People's Artiste of Azerbaijan.

== History ==
The first award was given to musician Gurban Pirimov in 1931. The last award was given to film director Ajdar Ibrahimbeyov in 1991.

This honorary title award was succeeded by the People's Artiste of Azerbaijan title in 1990.

== See also ==
- List of Azerbaijani actors
- List of Azerbaijani composers
- List of Azerbaijani dramatists and playwrights
- List of Azerbaijani musicians
- List of Azerbaijani opera singers
