= Azerbaijan State Choir Capella =

Azerbaijani choir collective established in 1966

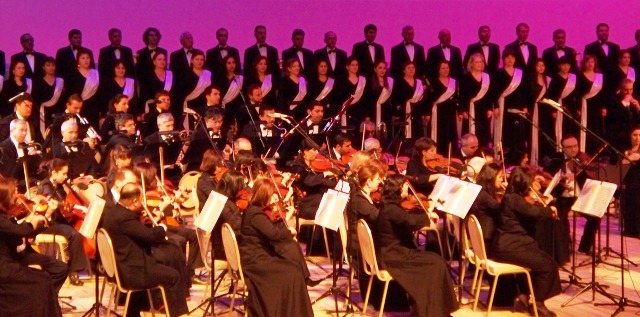
- Performance of the Azerbaijan State Choir Capella accompanied by the Azerbaijan State Symphony Orchestra at International World of Mugam Festival.

Background information
- Origin: Baku, Azerbaijan
- Occupation: Orchestra of National Instruments
- Years active: 1966–present
- Website: www.mugam.az

The Azerbaijan State Choir Capella an Azerbaijani choir collective established in 1966 and affiliated with the Azerbaijan State Philharmonic Hall. Repertoire of the capella includes more than thousand compositions of Azerbaijani and foreign composers (Johann Sebastian Bach, Wolfgang Amadeus Mozart, Giuseppe Verdi, Carl Orff, Igor Stravinsky, Vasif Adigozalov, Mammad Guliyev and others) and also folk songs and various patterns of choir music in it. Members of the capella have participated at Soviet and international festivals and ceremonies held both in Azerbaijan and other countries.

== Conductors of the capella ==
- E.Novruzov, Honored Art Worker, was the first director and chief conductor of the capella.
- Gulbaji Imanova, professor and People’s Artist of the Azerbaijani Republic, is the first artistic director and chief conductor of the Azerbaijan State Choir Capella since 1996.
