= Symphonic mugham =

- Stylistic origins: Mugham, Classical music, Azerbaijani folk music
- Cultural origins: Mid-20th century, Azerbaijan
- Typical instruments: Tar, kamancha, piano, violin, cello, clarinet, percussion
- Derivative forms: Contemporary classical music, World fusion

Other topics
- Fikret Amirov, Uzeyir Hajibeyov

Symphonic mugham (Azerbaijani: Simfonik muğam) is a genre of music that blends the traditional mugham with the structure and orchestration of Western classical music. It represents one of the most innovative musical movements in 20th-century Azerbaijan, uniting the improvisational spirit of mugham with the rich harmonies and textures of the symphony orchestra.

== History ==
The development of symphonic mugham began in the 1940s and 1950s, when Azerbaijani composers sought to bring national musical traditions into dialogue with European classical forms. The genre was pioneered by Fikret Amirov, whose works Shur (1946) and Kürd Ovşarı (1948) became milestones in Azerbaijani music history. Amirov's approach was later developed by other composers such as Niyazi, who created his own symphonic mugham Rast, and by Uzeyir Hajibeyov, who laid much of the theoretical groundwork for combining folk modes with orchestral harmony.

== Characteristics ==
Symphonic mugham combines the modal system and improvisational character of traditional mugham with the formal structure of a symphonic composition. While mugham typically relies on solo improvisation by singers or instrumentalists, symphonic mugham uses orchestral arrangement to convey the same spiritual and emotional depth. The genre often follows a programmatic form, moving from slow, meditative sections to powerful, dynamic climaxes.

Unlike pure Western symphonic music, symphonic mugham avoids strict tonal harmony, instead drawing on the microtonal intervals and modal scales of Azerbaijani music. It usually features instruments like the tar and kamancha alongside violins, cellos, and clarinets, symbolizing the meeting of East and West.

== Legacy ==
Symphonic mugham became one of the most recognized musical exports of Soviet Azerbaijan. It influenced generations of Azerbaijani composers and helped establish mugham as a sophisticated art form beyond the borders of the Caucasus. Today, works by Fikret Amirov and Niyazi are still performed by orchestras across the world, often featured in international festivals dedicated to world or fusion music.

== Notable works ==
- Fikret Amirov – Shur (1946)
- Fikret Amirov – Kürd Ovşarı (1948)
- Niyazi – Rast (1950s)
- Vasif Adigozalov – Gurjistan (later period)

== See also ==
- Music of Azerbaijan
