= Afsar Javanshirov =

Azerbaijani composer

- Əfsər Cavanşirov
- Born: 8 October 1930; Horadiz, Azerbaijan SSR, Soviet Union
- Died: 20 May 2006 (aged 75); Baku, Azerbaijan
- Education: Moscow Conservatory; Hajibeyov Azerbaijan State Conservatoire
- Occupation: Composer

Afsar Bayram oghlu Javanshirov (Note: Azerbaijani: Əfsər Bayram oğlu Cavanşirov) (8 November 1930 – 20 May 2006) was an Azerbaijani composer, Honored Art Worker of the Azerbaijan SSR.

== Biography ==
Afsar Javanshirov was born on 8 November 1930 in the Horadiz village. In 1948, he graduated from high school and children's music school No. 2. He graduated from the Baku Music College in 1952. In the same year he was admitted to the composition faculty of the Hajibeyov Azerbaijan State Conservatoire, in 1958 he graduated from the class of Professor Jovdat Hajiyev.

He was the art director of the "Bənövşə" children's choir and dance ensemble of the Azerbaijan State Television and Radio Broadcasting Company. He is the author of 7 symphonies for the Great Symphony Orchestra, poems, works for the a cappella choir, works for the children's choir, etc.

Afsar Javanshirov died on 20 May 2006 in Baku.

== Awards ==
- Honored Art Worker of the Azerbaijan SSR — 1 December 1982
- Honorary Decree of the Supreme Soviet of the Azerbaijan SSR — 18 May 1972
