= Gadir Rustamov =

- Born: Qədir Çərkəz oğlu Rüstəmov; 3 March 1935; Aghdam, Azerbaijani SSR, USSR
- Died: 14 December 2011 (aged 76) Istanbul, Turkey
- Genres: Mugham
- Occupation: Musician
- Instruments: Vocals, daf
- Years active: 1950–2009

Gadir Rustamov (Azerbaijani: Qədir Rüstəmov; 3 March 1935 – 14 December 2011) was an Azerbaijani mugham singer. He was taught mugham by Hajibaba Huseynov. He received the title of National Artist of Azerbaijan in 1992.
