= Abulfat Aliyev =

Azerbaijani singer

- Azerbaijani: Əbülfət Əliyev
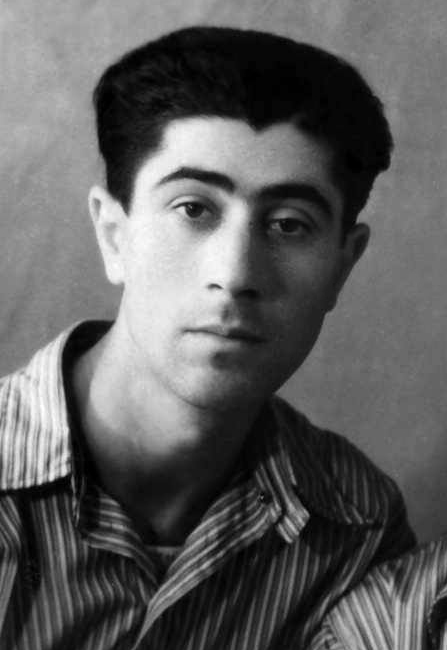
- Born: Əbülfət Əsəd oğlu Əliyev; December 30, 1926; Shusha, Azerbaijan SSR, TSFSR, USSR
- Died: December 27, 1990 (aged 63); Baku, Azerbaijan SSR, USSR
- Occupation: singer
- Awards: UNESCO badge

Abulfat Asad oghlu Aliyev (Azerbaijani: Əbülfət Əsəd oğlu Əliyev; December 30, 1926 – December 27, 1990) was an Azerbaijani opera and mugham singer, People's Artist of the Azerbaijan SSR.

== Biography ==
Abulfat Aliyev was born on December 30, 1926, in Shusha. After his father's death Aliyev's family moved from Shusha to Fuzuli where they lived for four years. His family then moved to Aghdam and he continued with his education at a city school. For the first time he sang the song "Shushanin Daghlari" on the radio. At that time 19-year-old Abulfat moved to Baku.

From 1945 he became a soloist of Azerbaijan State Academic Philharmonic Hall. The repertoire of the singer included more than 400 folk and composer songs such as "Dina bilmadim", "Bu gala, dashli qala", "Ay Pari", "Endim bulag bashina", "Bulbullar gazar baghi", "Tel nazik", "Sachlari burma", "Gel-gel", "Xal yanaghinda", "Gara gozlum".

In 1956 he appeared on the stage of Opera and Ballet Theater for the first time. Aliyev worked there until 1962.

The singer, who took part in the International Music Congress in Moscow in 1971, was awarded a UNESCO badge and diploma for high performance, and his performance was broadcast on All-Union Radio.

Aliyev died on December 27, 1990, in Baku.

== Memorial ==
- December 27, 1994 – Memorial evening at Azerbaijan State Academic Philharmonic Hall
- 2004 – A documentary about Abulfat Aliyev

== Awards and honorary titles ==
- Honored Artist of the Azerbaijan SSR – 26 April 1958
- People's Artist of the Azerbaijan SSR – 29 June 1964
- UNESCO badge – 1971
