= Sakhavat Mammadov =

- Born: Sakhavat Amirkhan oglu Mahammadov; 5 May 1953; Abdal, Aghdam District, Azerbaijani SSR, USSR
- Died: 30 September 1991 (aged 38) Azerbaijan
- Genres: Mugham
- Occupation: Musician
- Instruments: Singing, Daf
- Years active: 1963–1991

Sakhavat Mammadov (Azerbaijani: Səxavət Məmmədov; 23 October 1953 – 30 September 1991) was an Azerbaijani mugham singer.

== Death ==
On Monday, 30 September 1991, Sakhavat died in a motor vehicle accident. He could not be buried in his home village due to Armenian occupation of Aghdam.
