= Segah =

Musical Notation

Characteristic trichord of maqam sigah, on E half-flat

Segah (From Persian se-gāh, سه + گاه = سه‌گاه "third place") is a musical mugham in Persian, Azeri and Turkish traditional music.

== Description ==
It is named Segah because the maqam starts on the third degree in relation to the "basic" "Magham" scale found in Rast. Sigah features a half-flat tonic and a half-flat fifth scale degree; as such, it has an unstable sound that tends to favor its own third degree, found on a whole tone.

This is the third mode and consists of 0.5-1-1 tone which is created in amalgamation of three tetra-chords with the reach method. Segah mugam associated with love, romantic feelings at listener. Subgenres of Segah includes: egah Zabul-Segah-Bardasht, Maye, Muya, Manandi-Mukhalif, Segah, high-pitched tone Zabul, Manandi-Hisar (in high-pitched tone), Manandi-Mukhalif (in high-pitched tone), Ashig-Kush, Mubarriga, Zabul, space for Segah, Kharij Segah-Bardasht, Maye, Takhtigah, Mubarriga, Manandi-Hisar, Manandi-Mukhalif, high-pitched tone Segah, space for Kharij Segah. Other mugams relating to the Segah are: Hashym Segah-sol, Kharij Segah-si, Mirza-Huseyn-lya, Orta Segah-mi, Zabul Segah.

In classical Turkish music, it denotes the "si half flat" pitch and the melody type in this pitch.

Middle eastern Sephardic Jews make heavy use of this in their liturgy. For the prayers during Parashas Bo, Beha'alotecha, and Eqeb, parashas that are the "third" in their respective books, maqam Sigah is used. It is also applied on holidays. This maqam is linked to the holiday of Purim due to the abundance of pizmonim related to the holiday in this maqam (no doubt because the maqam is of Persian origin, and the events of the book of Esther take place in Persia). This maqam is also of importance because it is the maqam that is always used for the cantillation of the Torah.

Related maqamat are Huzam and Iraq.

== See also ==
- Dastgah
