= Tüklə =

- Municipality
- Location within Azerbaijan
- Coordinates: 38°52′30″N 48°40′22″E
- Country: Azerbaijan
- Rayon: Masally

Population
  - Total: 1,571
- Time zone: UTC+4 (AZT)
  - Summer (DST): UTC+5 (AZT)

Tüklə (also, Tükävilä, Tyukavilya, and Tyukevilya) is a village and municipality in the Masally District of Azerbaijan. It has a population of 1,571.
