= Horadiz (village) =

Horadiz Horadiz
- Location within Azerbaijan
- Coordinates: 39°27′4″N 47°14′8″E
- Country: Azerbaijan
- District: Fuzuli
- Time zone: UTC+4 (AZT)

Horadiz is a village in the Fuzuli District of Azerbaijan.
