= Gulyanag Mammadova =

Azerbaijani singer (born 1973)

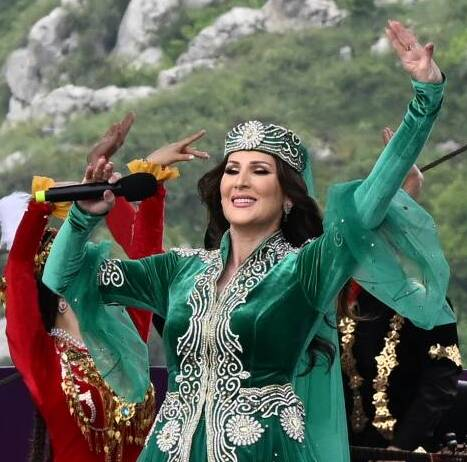
- Born: Məmmədova Gülyanaq Zakir qızı July 10, 1973 (age 53); Böyük Dəhnə, Shaki District, Azerbaijan SSR, USSR
- Occupation: singer
- Awards: Народный артист Азербайджанской Республики — 2014 (People's Artiste of Azerbaijan); Заслуженный артист Азербайджанской Республики — 1998 (Honored Artist of Azerbaijan); Народный артист Республики Узбекистан — 30 августа 2022( (People's Artist of Uzbekistan)

Gulyanag Mamedova (Azerbaijani: Məmmədova Gülyanaq Zakir qızı; born June 10, 1973) is an Azerbaijani vocal performer, a soloist at the Rashid Behbudov Azerbaijan State Song Theatre. She was awarded the title of People's Artist of Azerbaijan in 2014 and later became a People's Artist of the Republic of Uzbekistan in 2022.

== Biography ==
Gulyanag Mamedova was born on June 10, 1973, in the village of Böyük Dəhnə, Shaki District, Azerbaijan SSR.

From 1980 to 1990, she attended School No. 1 in Böyük Dəhnə. Between 1992 and 1996, she studied music at the music college affiliated with the Azerbaijan National Conservatory. Following that, from 1996 to 2000, she pursued studies at the acting faculty of the Azerbaijan State University of Culture and Arts, specializing in musical theater and cinema acting. In 2002, she graduated from the university with a master's degree.

From 1990 to 1992, she worked at the Shaki District House of Culture. In 1993, she began her career as a vocalist at the Rashid Behbudov Azerbaijan State Song Theatre. From 1995 to 1997, she participated in the "Malme" festival in Malmo, Sweden. She held solo concerts in Stockholm and Gothenburg, performed at the 2000 Expo in Hannover, Germany, the 2000 "Bosphorus" festival in Turkey in Istanbul and Ankara.

Between 2001 and 2002, she performed in the concert program for the promotion of the "Baku-Tbilisi-Ceyhan" pipeline group. In 2002, she represented Azerbaijan in Strasbourg, France, on the first anniversary of Azerbaijan's accession to the Council of Europe. She toured with concerts in Austria, Russia, and Ukraine from 2002 to 2003. She represented Azerbaijan's national culture in Moscow during the "Days of Azerbaijani Culture." Similar events took place in Ukraine, Belarus, and Germany. In 2004, she performed for the Nowruz celebration in Yekaterinburg, in 2005, in Chisinau and Vienna, and in 2006, a concert featuring her took place in Nakhchivan.

== Family ==
Sister - Gulyaz Zakir Mamedova, People's Artist of the Republic of Azerbaijan.

== Awards ==
- Народный артист Азербайджанской Республики — 2014 (People's Artiste of Azerbaijan)
- Заслуженный артист Азербайджанской Республики — 1998 (Honored Artist of Azerbaijan)
- Народный артист Республики Узбекистан — 30 августа 2022(People's Artist of Uzbekistan)
- Президентская премия — 2012 (Presidential Award - 2012)
