= Bahram Mansurov =

Azerbaijani musician (1911–1985)

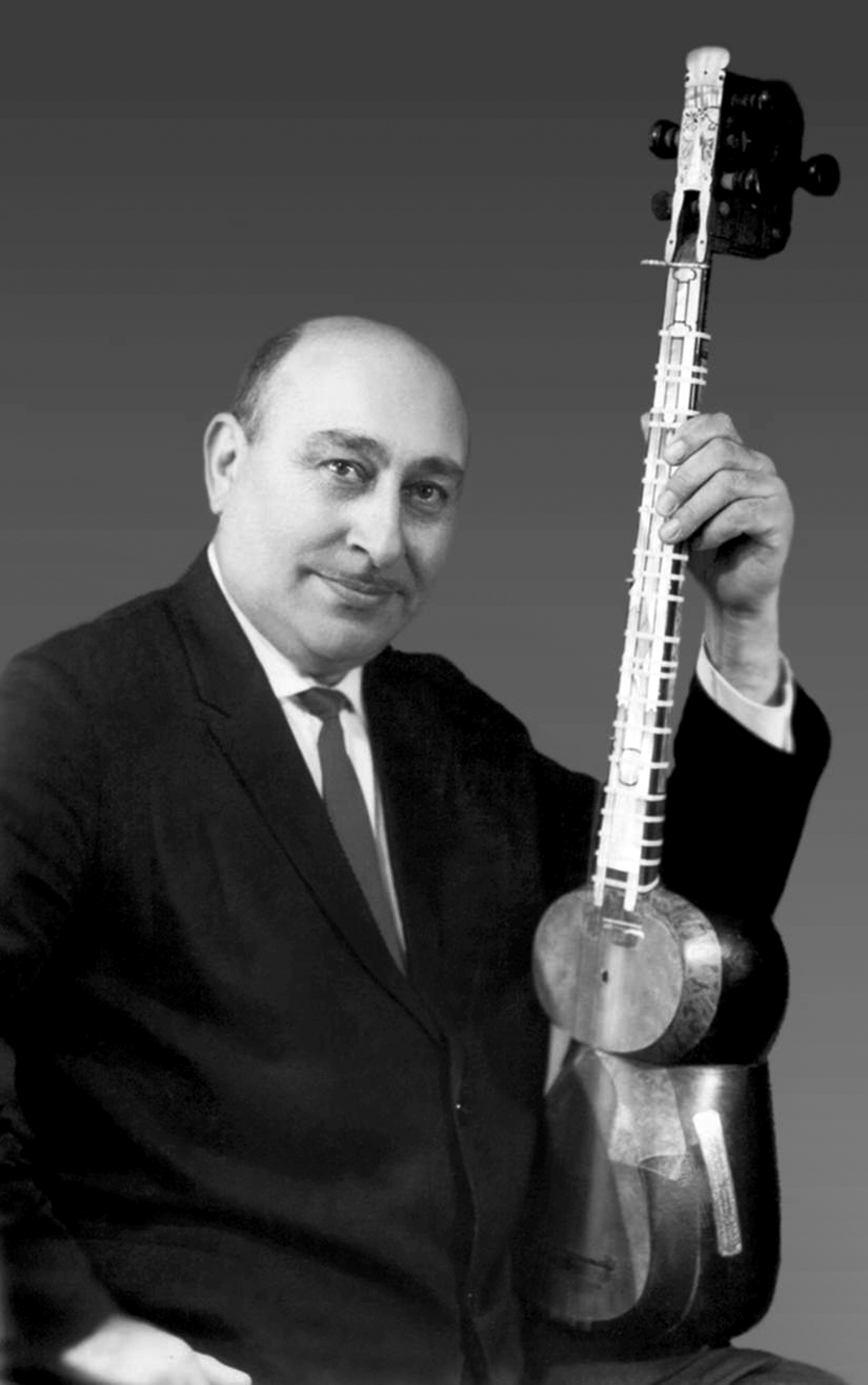

Background information
- Born: Bahram Meshadi Suleyman oglu Mansurov; 12 February 1911; Baku, Baku Governorate
- Died: 14 May 1985 (aged 74) Baku, Azerbaijan SSR
- Genres: Mugham
- Instrument: tar
- Formerly of: Eldar Mansurov (son)

Bahram Meshadi Suleyman oglu Mansurov (Azerbaijani: Bəhram Məşədi Süleyman bəy oğlu Mansurov / Бәһрам Мәшәди Сүлејман бәј оғлу Мансуров, IPA: [bæhˈɾɑm mæʃæˈdi sylejˈmɑn bæj oɣˈlu mɑnˈsuɾof]; 12 February 1911, Baku – 14 May 1985, Baku) was a Soviet and Azerbaijani Tar (lute) player. He also served as People's Artist of the Azerbaijan SSR (10.01.1978).

== Biography ==
Bahram Mansurov was born into a well-to-do family of Baku. His father, Meshadi Suleyman bey Mansurov, was famed as a philanthropist and great expert on mugham. Meshadi Suleyman bey—a virtuosic player of tar—often held musical majlises (parties) in his mansion in Icheri Sheher. In 1925, Bahram Mansurov graduated from school. In 1929, he was invited as a tar player to the orchestra under the artistic association "Azconcert", the main participants of which were such well-known performers as, Gurban Pirimov, Jabbar Garyagdioglu, Khan Shushinski and others. Working in the orchestra, the musician travelled throughout Azerbaijan and visited many Soviet cities. In 1931, Bahram Mansurov was invited to newly originated folk orchestra, but afterward the tar player was admitted to work on the radio. In 1932, on Muslim Magomayev, the senior's initiative Bahram Mansurov began to work in the Azerbaijan State Academic Opera and Ballet Theater as the soloist-accompanist. In 1938, Bahram Mansurov participated in the decade of Azerbaijani culture, in Moscow. In 1941, Bahram Mansurov went to Iran with the membership of the Azerbaijan State Academic Opera and Ballet Theatre. Tours of this team were successful in this country. Mansurov was invited to Baku Musical School to teach mugham after the return from Iran.

During the Great Patriotic War, Bahram Mansurov performed in front of the soldiers and injured men. In 1944, he repeatedly went to Iran and performed in many cities of Iran. After the war, the musician was awarded many orders and honorary diplomas.

In 1971 and 1975, two recording discs were produced under the auspices of UNESCO, and Bahram Mansurov repeatedly took part in international symposiums and concerts in Europe with the support of this organization. In the issue of collaboration of the musician with some museums and archives of the USSR, valuable materials about the musical history of Azerbaijan were presented to them from the family archive. Bahram Mansurov presented his tar to the museum of Japan city Osaka. In 1978, he was awarded the honorary title of People's Artist of the Azerbaijan SSR.

== Awards ==
- Medal "For the Defence of the Caucasus"
- Medal "For Valiant Labour in the Great Patriotic War 1941-1945"
- Jubilee Medal "Thirty Years of Victory in the Great Patriotic War 1941-1945"
- Jubilee Medal "Forty Years of Victory in the Great Patriotic War 1941-1945"
