= Nazakat Mammadova =

Nazakat Mammadova (Azerbaijani: Nəzakət Məmmədova, Назакет Мамедова; February 28, 1944, in Ganja – October 21, 1980, in Sochi) was an Azerbaijani singer. She started her career in the Lale girls musical group and between 1970 and 1980 she was with the Azerbaijan State Academic Opera and Ballet Theater. She sang folk music as well as mugham.
