= Rubaba Muradova =

Azerbaijani singer (1930–1983)

- Born: Rubaba Khalil qizi Ishragi; 21 March 1933; Ardabil, Pahlavi Iran
- Died: 28 August 1983 (aged 50) Baku, Azerbaijan SSR, Soviet Union
- Genres: Opera, Folk
- Years active: 1947–1983

Rubaba Khalil qizi Muradova (Azerbaijani: Rübabə Muradova) (née Rubaba Ishragi; 21 March 1933 – 28 August 1983), was an Iranian and Azerbaijani opera (mezzo-soprano) and folk singer. She graduated from the Zeynalli College of Music in Baku and worked at the Azerbaijan State Opera and Ballet Theatre, where she started in 1954. In 1971, Muradova became the People's Artiste of the Azerbaijan SSR.

== Early life ==
Rubaba Muradova was born to a family of cleric in the Iranian city of Ardabil. In 1943, she moved to the Soviet Azerbaijan, and settled in the city of Ali Bayramli. Since age 17, she acted in various roles at the local theaters.

== Career ==
In 1950, a troupe from Baku was touring the region. During the tour, an actress for one of the main roles got sick, and the head trouper agreed to replace her with Muradova for one night. Despite poor performance (according to Muradova herself), she was successful mostly due to her vocal improvisation of the role. She then was invited to move to Baku to pursue a degree in professional singing.

In 1953, she graduated from the Zeynalli College of Music in Baku, where she was taught by prominent khananda Seyid Shushinski. She started working at the Azerbaijan State Opera and Ballet Theatre in 1954. Her most famous role was that of Leyli in Uzeyir Hajibeyov's Leyli and Majnun (1908). Muradova's melodic improvisations are remembered for their emotional qualities that often bring the audience to tears. Her colleagues explained this emotional singing by the difficulties Muradova experienced in her personal life, particularly her being homesick for Ardabil and not being able to visit it because of the closed Soviet-Iranian border.

== Awards ==
In 1971, Muradova became the People's Artiste of the Azerbaijan SSR.
