= Aghakhan Abdullayev =

Azerbaijani singer (1950–2016)

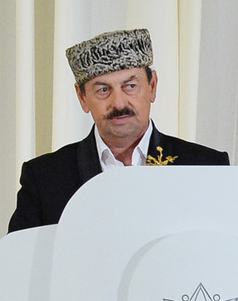

Background information
- Born: 6 February 1950; Baku, Azerbaijan SSR, USSR
- Died: 25 December 2016 (aged 66)
- Genres: Mugham
- Occupation: Musician
- Instruments: Vocals, daf
- Years active: 1975–present

Aghakhan Minakhan oghlu Abdullayev (Azerbaijani: Ağaxan Minaxan oğlu Abdullayev; 6 February 1950 – 25 December 2016) was an Azerbaijani khananda folk singer. He was often called "Guardian" of the Mugham.

== Life ==
Abdullayev was born in Baku, where he graduated from secondary school in 1968, then continued his education at the Zeynally Music College until 1973. He became a mugham teacher in 1973 at the Abilov Culture House in Baku and also worked as a teacher at the Zeynally Music College in 1977.

His concert career started in 1975 on the stage of Azerbaijan State Philharmonic Hall. He performed concerts in several countries of the world, including Iran, Canada, Russia, Austria, Sweden, US, and many other countries in Europe, Asia, and Latin America.

In 1992, he was awarded the title of Honored Artist of the Azerbaijan Republic, and in 1998, he was designated People's Artist of the Azerbaijan Republic. In 2000, for his pedagogical activity, he was awarded an Honorary Diploma by the Ministry of Education of the Azerbaijan Republic. In 2001, he received the "Simurg" Award of the National Award Fund, and in 2002, the Humay National Award. He also received in 2003 the "Live on, Azerbaijan" Award.
