= International Mugham Center of Azerbaijan =

Music center aiming to preserve mugham genre

Coordinates: 40°21′39″N 49°50′06″E

- Exterior view of the Mugham Center

General information
- Type: Performance venue, studio, museum
- Architectural style: Modern architecture
- Location: Baku, Azerbaijan
- Completed: 29 December 2008
- Owner: Azerbaijani Government

Technical details
- Floor count: 3
- Floor area: 7,500 m^{2} (81,000 sq ft)

The International Mugham Center of Azerbaijan is a center of Azerbaijani arts and music aiming to promote, preserve, and popularize the mugham genre of Azerbaijani music. It is located in Baku Boulevard, in downtown Baku.

== Overview of the center ==
Center interior

The Mugham Center was built on the initiative of the First Lady of Azerbaijan, Mehriban Aliyeva. Mugham is a genre included in the representative list of the UNESCO Intangible Cultural Heritage of Humanity. The official opening of the International Mugham Center took place on December 27, 2008. UNESCO's ninth Director-General Koichiro Matsuura also participated in that opening ceremony.

== Architectural description ==
The construction of the building started in April 2005. The center covers 7,500 square meters and has 3 stories. The funding was provided by the Heydar Aliyev Foundation. The design of the building was based on the elements and shapes of the tar, an Azeri musical instrument used in performing mugham. Furthermore, the center was commenced on the basis of the architectural works of Vahid Tansu, Xauddin Yayk and Etirne Ahmed. The concert hall fits 350 people. The center also has a club, 80-seat restaurant called "Ud", study halls, and record studios. Modern heating and ventilation systems were also provided in the center. The building was constructed with equipment from Italy, Austria, France and Turkey.

== Target of the center ==
The center hosts mugham festivals, concerts, and recitals of various singers and performers. Young performers become aware of the art of mugham, which has a special role in the Azerbaijani music culture. The center hosts famous masters, mugham evenings, international conferences, and festivals.

== Attendants of the projects ==
Participants come from different countries such as Spain, Netherlands, Belgium, Slovenia, USA, Germany, France, Great Britain, Tajikistan, Iran, Uzbekistan, Turkey, China, India, Tunisia, Jordan and Russia.

== International World of Mugham Festival ==
The International World of Mugham Festival (Azerbaijani: Beynəlxalq Muğam Dünyası Festivalı) was held on Heydar Aliyev Foundation’s initiative, on March 18–25, 2009, in Baku. The opening ceremony of the festival was held on March 20, in the International Mugham Center of Azerbaijan. A contest of mugham singers, multiple mugham operas, and symphonic and classical mugham concerts were held during the festival. The festival was concluded by a gala concert, which was held on March 25, 2009, in Heydar Aliyev Palace, in Baku.

A scientific symposium of mugham was held during the international festival and lasted for 3 days. About 30 scientists, musicians, and also promoters of traditional eastern music from the more than 16 countries took part at the symposium. Presentations about musical cultures of Azerbaijan, Iran, Turkey, Pakistan, India, Tunisia, Uzbekistan, Tajikistan were given during the festival and the issue of First Nagorno-Karabakh War was also raised there.
