= Tükəvilə =

Village in Lankaran Rayon, Azerbaijan

Coordinates: 38°51′N 48°41′E

Tükəvilə is a village and municipality in the Lankaran Rayon of Azerbaijan. It has a population of 1,344.
