= Mugham =

Folk musical composition from Azerbaijan

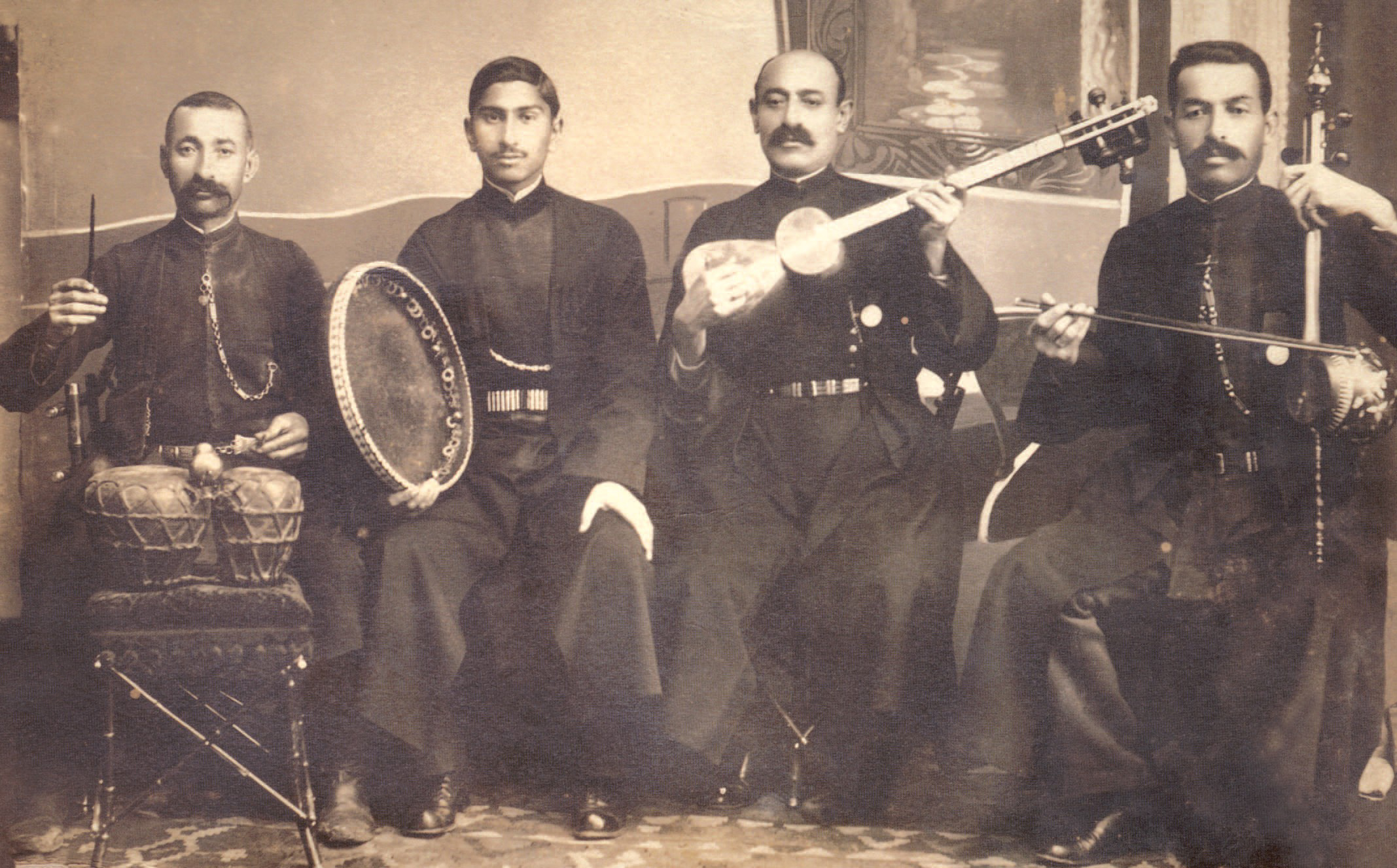
- Mugham performer khananda Seyid Shushinski (second from left) with his ensemble in 1916
- Native name: Muğam
- Cultural origins: Middle Ages
- Typical instruments: Daf, Tar, Kamancheh, Balaban, Qanun, Oud, Çeng, Naqareh

Subgenres
- Dastgah, tesnif, zerbi mugham, reng

Fusion genres
- Mugham opera, Symphonic mugham, Azerbaijani jazz

Azerbaijani Mugham
- UNESCO Intangible Cultural Heritage
- Country: Azerbaijan
- Reference: 00039
- Region: Europe and North America

Inscription history
- Inscription: 2008 (3rd session)
- List: Representative

Mugham (Azerbaijani: Muğam) or Mughamat (Azerbaijani: Muğamat) is one of the many classical compositions from Azerbaijan, contrasting with tasnif and ashik.

It is an art form that weds classical poetry and musical improvisation in specific local modes. Mugham is a modal system. Unlike Western modes, "mugham" modes are associated not only with scales but also with an orally transmitted collection of melodies and melodic fragments that performers use in the course of improvisation. Mugham is a compound composition of many parts. The choice of a particular mugham and a style of performance fits a specific event. The dramatic unfolding in performance is typically associated with increasing intensity and rising pitches, and a form of poetic-musical communication between performers and initiated listeners.

Three major schools of mugham performance existed from the late 19th and early 20th centuries in the regions of Karabakh, Shirvan, and Baku. The town of Shusha of Karabakh, was noted for this art.

A short selection of Azerbaijani mugham, played on the wind instrument balaban, was included among many cultural achievements of humanity on the Voyager Golden Record, which was attached to the Voyager spacecraft to represent world music.

In 2003, UNESCO proclaimed Azerbaijani Mugham a "Masterpiece of the Oral and Intangible Heritage of Humanity". It was added to the UNESCO Intangible Cultural Heritage Lists in 2008.

== History ==
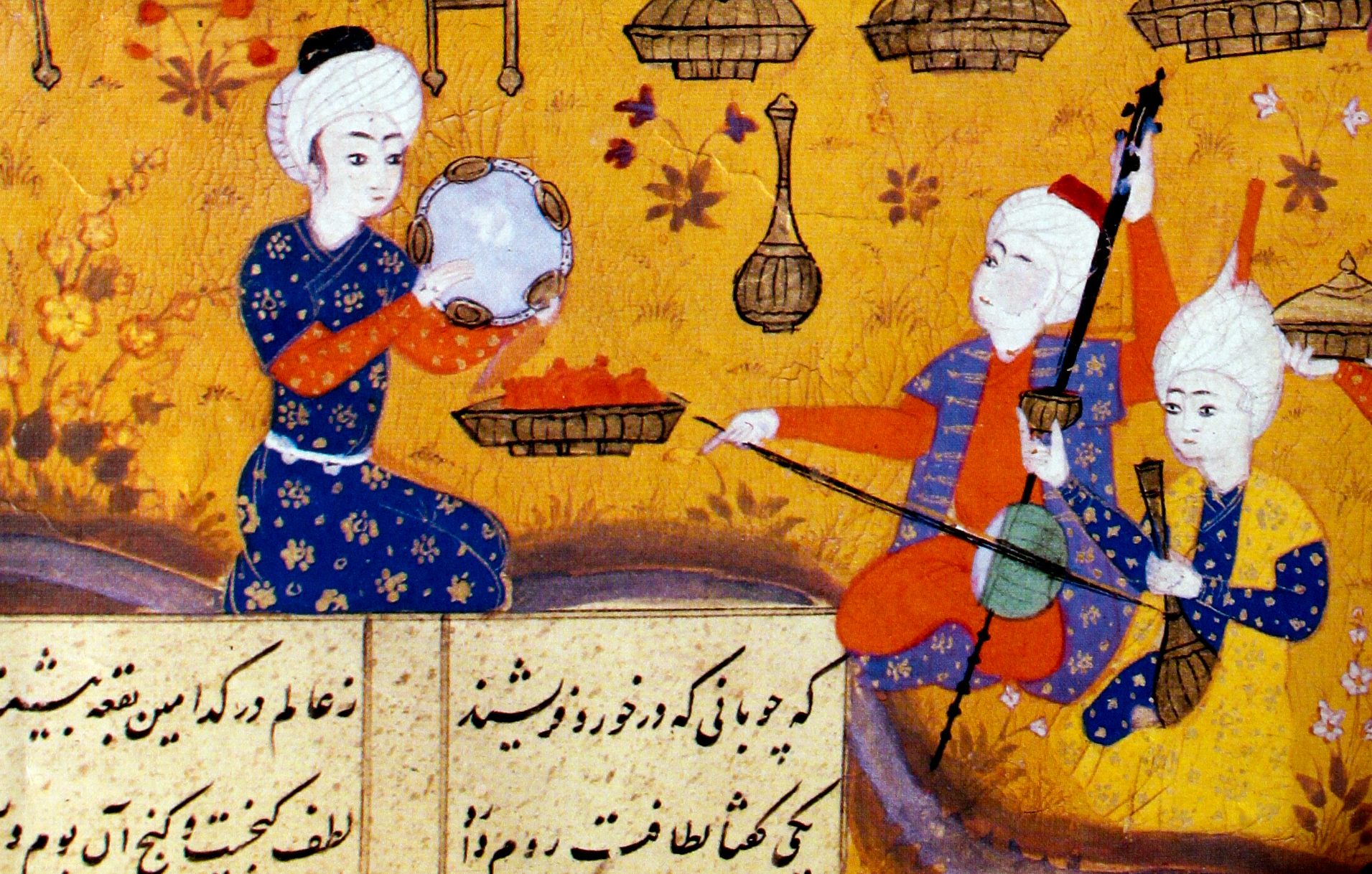
Persian performance, 16th century CE

In the course of its history, the people of Azerbaijan have retained their ancient musical tradition. Mugham belongs to the system of modal music and may have derived from Persian musical tradition. The Uighurs in Xinjiang (新疆) call this musical development muqam, the Uzbeks and Tajiks call it maqom (or shasmaqom), while Arabs call it maqam and Persians dastgah.

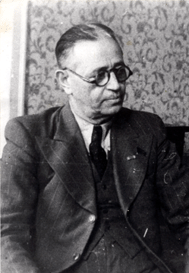
Uzeyir Hajibeyov merged traditional Azerbaijani music styles with Western styles early in the 20th century.

The meta-ethnicity and complexity of this music also becomes apparent in the fact that terms such as mugham, maqam, or dastgah, omnipresent in oriental music, can mean one thing in the Turkish tradition, while the same term in the music of Uzbekistan takes on quite another meaning, and yet another in the classical Arabic tradition. So, in one culture mugham may be related to a strictly fixed melodic type, while in another it is only the cadences, the melody endings that are associated with it. In a third culture it may only correspond to a specific type of tone scales.

Uzeyir Hajibeyov asserted that the mugham tradition disintegrated around the end of the fourteenth century during the Mongol rule. Afterward, each ethnic group in the area reconstructed its own system from the remnants.

In the 16–17th centuries the art of mugham was passing through the development process as a professional music of the palace. In this period a dastgah form starts to develop in the structure and forms of mugham. New colors and shades as well as tasnifs developed in mugham performance. The masters of mugham of Azerbaijan sang gazals written in aruz genre by Fuzuli, Habibi and Khatai. The music events were held in most regions of today's Azerbaijan in the 19th century and mugham was performed at these events. In the 19th century famous French writer Alexandre Dumas who attended the ceremony in Shamakhy, wrote in his works about his trip saying he was greatly impressed by mugham that sounded there. Such events held in Azerbaijan were attended by khanendes from Karabakh, Baku and Tabriz which in turn caused the blending of singing traditions of different regions.

In the early decades of the 20th century, a member of native intelligentsia, Uzeyir Hajibeyov, the author of the first national opera Leyli and Majnun, also formulated the theoretical basis of Azerbaijani mugham in his work The Principles of Azerbaijan Folk Music. Famous Azerbaijani composer Gara Garayev and Fikrat Amirov also made a great contribution to the development of the art of mugham through creating the mugham symphony.

Hajibaba Huseynov was credited as a key figure in the popularization of mugham, and developing talented mugham khanandas such as Alim Qasimov, Aghakhan Abdullayev and Gadir Rustamov. As of 1985, Agdam Mugham School functions in Azerbaijan, which produced the "Karabakh Nightingales" mugham ensemble.

Azerbaijan also has a great tradition of composers and musicians of western classical music. Uzeyir Hajibeyov with his Leyli and Majnun created the genre of mugham-opera. Fikret Amirov (1922–1984) was the first composer of symphonic mughams, namely Shur, Kurd Ovshari, and Gulistan Bayati Shiraz. Azerbaijani composers created a plethora of compositions that fused mugham and traditional European genres. Among those, for example, Vasif Adigozal's mugham oratorio Karabakh Shikastasi. Such works are obviously very different from traditional mugham formations but in fact incorporate many mugham idioms. On the level of musicians, there remains a strict separation between classical and "traditional" music in terms of training. Even if the musicians are educated at the same conservatorium they stick to one camp.

In 2005, International Center of Mugham created under the decree of Azerbaijani president Ilham Aliyev. In August of same year, on the territory of the Baku Boulevard, Ilham Aliyev with his spouse, the Goodwill Ambassador of UNESCO Mehriban Aliyeva and UNESCO Director General Koichiro Matsuura, laid the first stone at the base of the complex. Opening of the complex took place on December 27, 2008. The total area of center is 7500 meters squared, which also includes concert saloon of 350 people, recording studio, rooms for rehearsals. In the foyer, visitors can find busts of famous mugham performers, also a rich collection of musical instruments.

== The modes of mugham ==
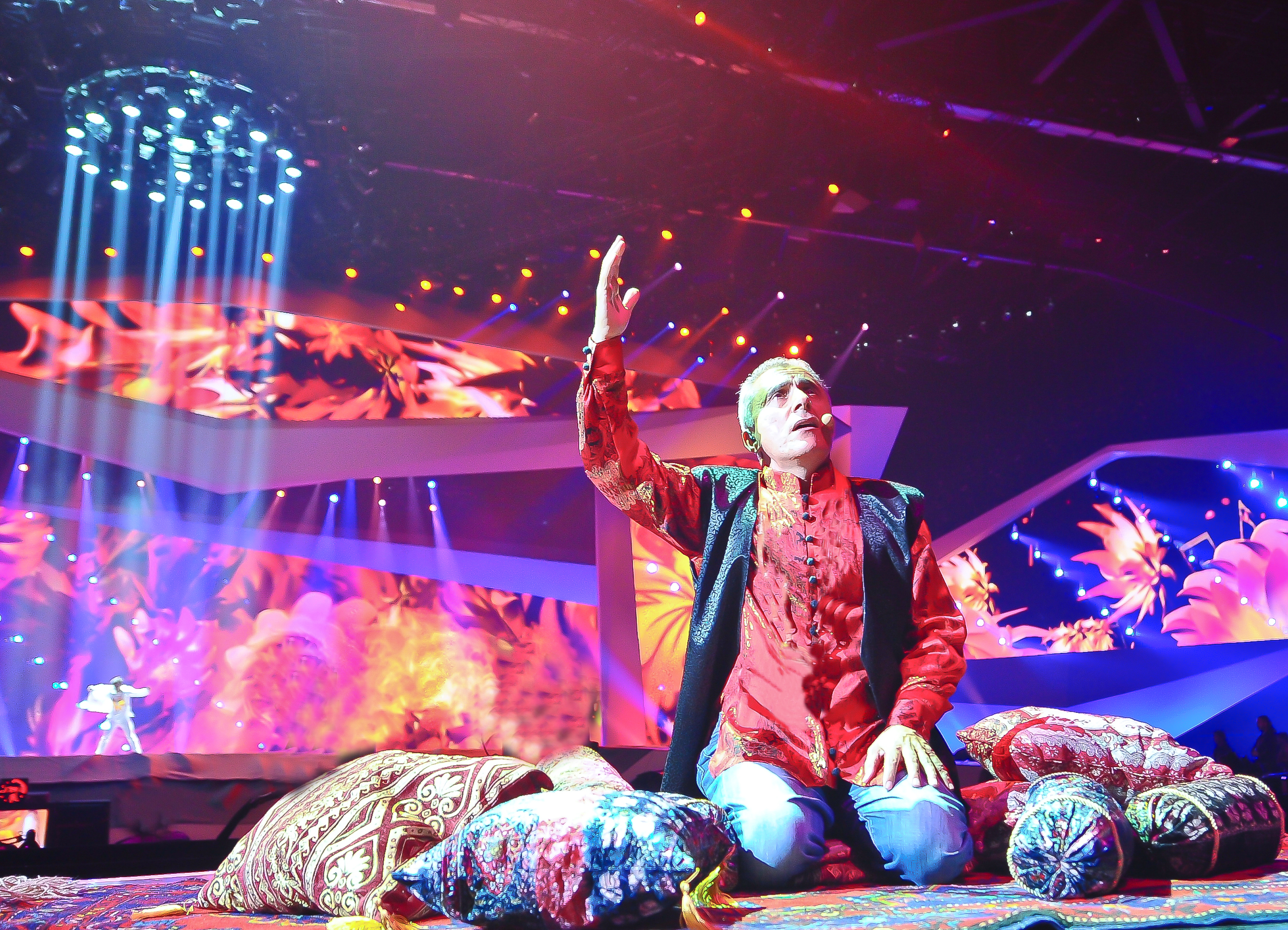
Alim Gasimov performs mugham in Eurovision Song Contest.

In recent years, Azerbaijan folk music existed within the scope of folk art. The vocal-instrumental forms of folklore contain the elements of polyphony. The peculiarity of folk music clarifies itself firstly with the development of a modal system. It contains seven main modes – Rast, Shur, Segah (are especially common), Shushtar, Bayaty-Shiraz, Chahargah, Humayun and three collateral kinds – shahnaz, sarendj, chargah in some other form. Before, it was considered that each of the modes has its special vivid emotional meaning. Every mode represents a strongly organized scale, possessing a firm tonic prop (maye), and each step of the mode has its melodic function.

Jabbar Garyaghdioglu performs "Heyrati" mugham (with Gurban Pirimov on tar and Gylman Salahov on kamancheh).

Zarbi mugham includes nine modes – Heyrati, Arazbari, Samayi-Shams, Mansuriyya, Mani, Ovshari, Heydari, Karabakh Shikastasi and Kasma Shikastasi.

== Analysis ==
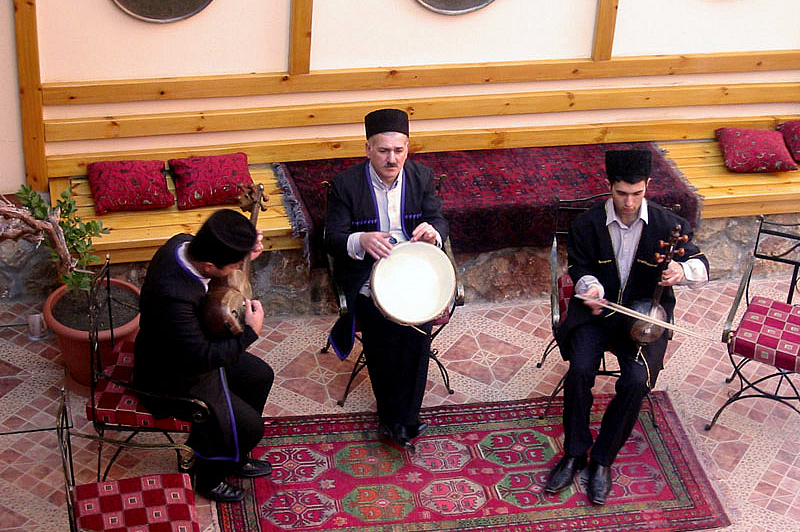
Mugham performers in Baku. From left (tar, daf, kamancha).

Part of the confusion arises from the fact that the term itself can have two different, if related meanings. The famous Azerbaijani composer Gara Garayev has the following explanation: "The expression mugham is used in two senses in the folk music of Azerbaijan. On the one hand the word mugham describes the same thing as the term lad [Russian for key, mode, scale]. An analysis of Azerbaijani songs, dances and other folk-music forms show that they are always constructed according to one [of these] modes. On the other hand the term mugham refers to an individual, multi-movement form. This form combines elements of a suite and a rhapsody, is symphonic in nature, and has its own set of structural rules. In particular one should observe that the suite-rhapsody-mugham is constructed according to one particular mode-mugham and is subject to all of the particular requirements of this mode." (Sovetskaya Muzyka 1949:3). Azerbaijani conservatory throughout the 20th century produced significant scholars and scholarship. Among them, Rena Mamedova explored the philosophical content of mugham, as an Azerbaijani "formula of creative thinking". Elkhan Babayev wrote extensively on rhythmic aspect of mugham performance. The native scholars continued and expanded Hajibeyov's analysis of mugham.

Mugham describes a specific type of musical composition and performance, which is hard to grasp with western concepts of music in another respect: for one, mugham composition is improvisational in nature. At the same time it follows exact rules. Furthermore, in the case of a suite-rhapsody-mugham the concept of improvisation is not really an accurate one, since the artistic imagination of the performers is based on a strict foundation of principles determined by the respective mode. The performance of mughams does therefore not present an amorphous and spontaneous, impulsive improvisation.

With respect to the concept of improvisation, mugham music is often put in relation to jazz, a comparison that is accurate to a certain point only. Although mugham does allow for a wide margin of interpretation, an equation with jazz is oversimplified, since it fails to account for the different kinds of improvisation for different mugham modes. The performance of a certain mugham may last for hours. (For the uninitiated listener it is close to impossible to know whether a musician is actually improvising or playing a prearranged composition.) Furthermore, as Garayev stresses, mugham music has a symphonic character.

The songs are often based on the medieval and modern poetry of Azerbaijan, and although love is a common topic in these poems, to the uninitiated ear many of the intricacies and allusions are lost. For one, the poems do not primarily deal with worldly love but with the mystical love for god. Yet, strictly speaking, this is still secular music/poetry, as opposed to, say, Sufism. Nevertheless, mugham composition is designed very similarly to Sufism in that it seeks to achieve ascension from a lower level of awareness to a transcendental union with god. It is a spiritual search for god.

== Derivatives and offshoots ==
=== Jazz mugham ===
The famous Azerbaijani jazz musician Vagif Mustafazadeh, who died in 1979, is credited with fusing jazz with mugham. Jazz mugham is jazz based on the modal forms or scales of mughams, just as a mugham symphonies are symphonies based on mughams. Ordinary jazz is marked by metered rhythm. But mugham jazz does not follow a metered system. Both rhythm and scales are improvised.

In recent years, interest to jazz mugham has seen rise in many western countries, particularly in the United States, Austria and Japan. In 1995, Jeff Buckley performed "What Will You Say" as a duet with Alim Qasimov at the Festival de la Musique Sacrée (Festival of Sacred Music) in France.

== Cultural significance ==
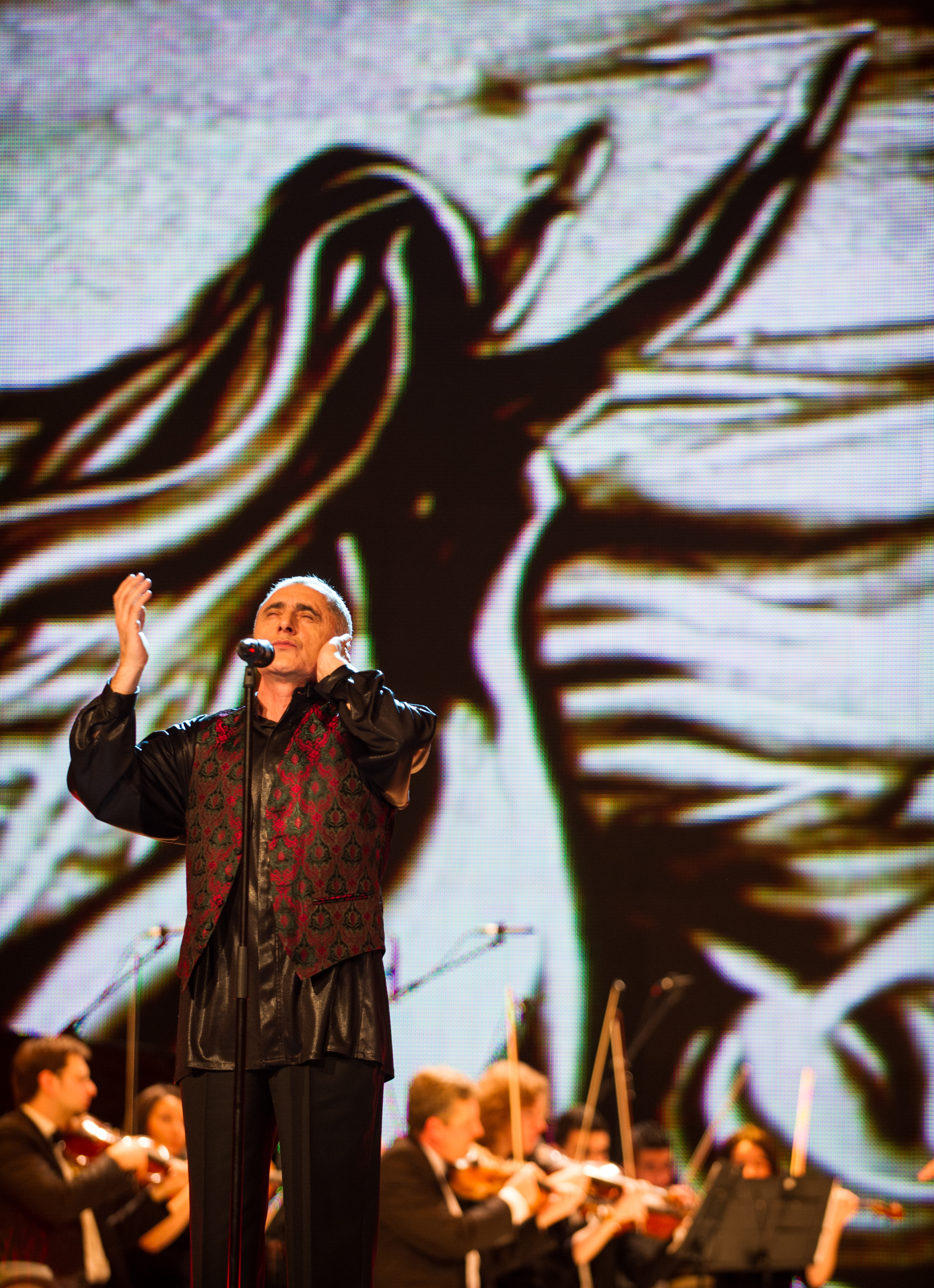
Alim Gasimov on the semi-final allocation draw ceremony of Eurovision Song Contest 2012

In 2003, UNESCO has acknowledged the authenticity, richness and cultural significance of mugham both national and global culture, and in 2003 announced it as a "Masterpiece of Oral and Intangible Cultural Heritage of Humanity".

Considered to be the classical music of Azerbaijan, the mugham is a traditional musical form characterized by a large degree of improvisation and draws upon popular stories and local melodies. The recent evolution of the cultural industry has threatened the improvisational nature and the ear-to-ear transmission of this art form. During his official visit to the country in August 2005, the Director-General of UNESCO, in the company of President Ilham Aliyev and several Goodwill Ambassadors, attended a foundation stone-laying ceremony of a Mugham Centre. In 2004, Mehriban Aliyeva, the First Lady of Azerbaijan, was named as a UNESCO Goodwill Ambassador for the oral and musical traditions.

Since 2009, International World of Mugham Festival is held with the participations of famous artists from all over the world.

== Social impact ==
The massive popularity of mugham resulted in a powerful impact on worldwide society. Many of mugham khanandas were known as country-loving, powerful, respectful characters, and mugham was popularly associated with sign of pain and hope during First Nagorno-Karabakh War.

Mugham has lived and sounded in Azerbaijan in all periods, independently of political, public and economic situations, and reserved its place in Azerbaijani culture. The mugham masters play a large role in the transition of mugham from generation to generation.

== Notable performers ==
=== Individuals ===
==== Female ====
- Malakkhanim Ayyubova
- Shovkat Alakbarova
- Konul Khasiyeva
- Sara Gadimova
- Gandab Guliyeva
- Sakina Ismayilova
- Tukezban Ismayilova
- Yaver Kelenterli
- Farghana Qasimova
- Nazakat Mammadova
- Rubaba Muradova
- Basti Sevdiyeva
- Jahan Talyshinskaya
- Nazaket Teymurova
- Zuzu Zakaria

==== Male ====
Alim Qasimov · Jabbar Garyagdioglu · Seyid Shushinski

- Aghakhan Abdullayev
- Abulfat Aliyev
- Ahmed Agdamski
- Shakili Alasgar
- Janali Akbarov
- Gulu Asgarov
- Arif Babayev
- Bulbuljan
- Jabbar Garyagdyoglu
- Talat Gasimov
- Zahid Guliyev
- Hajibaba Huseynov
- Mansum Ibrahimov
- Kechachioghlu Muhammed
- Sabir Mirzayev
- Alibaba Mammadov
- Sakhavat Mammadov
- Yagub Mammadov
- Zabit Nabizadeh
- Alim Qasimov
- Islam Rzayev
- Gadir Rustamov
- Khan Shushinski
- Musa Shushinski
- Seyid Shushinski

=== Musicians ===
- Elnur Ahmadov
- Firuz Aliyev
- Habil Aliyev
- Firuz Aliyev
- Elchin Hashimov
- Sahib Pashazade
- Kamil Jalilov
- Mansur Mansurov
- Mazahir Mammadov
- Bahram Mansurov
- Gurban Pirimov
- Sadigjan

== See also ==
- Franghiz Ali-Zadeh
- Vagif Mustafazadeh
- Aziza Mustafazadeh
- Music of Azerbaijan
- Culture of Azerbaijan
- History of Azerbaijan
- International Mugham Center of Azerbaijan
- Mugham triads
