= Seyid Shushinski =

Azerbaijani khananda folk singer (1889–1965)

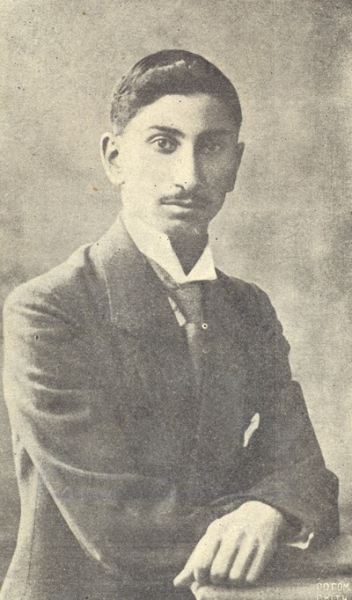

Background information
- Born: 12 April 1889 the village of Horadiz, present-day Azerbaijan
- Died: 1 November 1965 (aged 76) Baku, Azerbaijan
- Genres: Folk
- Years active: 1904 – 1963

Seyid Shushinski (Azerbaijani: Seyid Şuşinski), born Mir Mohsun Seyid Ibrahim oglu Shushinski (12 April 1889, the village of Horadiz – 1 November 1965, Baku), was an Azerbaijani khananda folk singer.

== Early career ==
He was born in the village of Horadiz, in the present-day Fizuli District, Azerbaijan. He lost his father at a young age and was raised by his aunt Meshadi Khurzad, who was a folk singer. Shushinski received primary education at a religious school in his hometown. Thanks to his musical talent, he joined his first musical ensemble at the age of 15. He made his first public performance in 1908 in Shusha, which proved to be a great success and brought the 19-year-old singer big fame in the city. At his uncle's insistence, Shushinski completed another 2 years of musical education at Mir Mohsun Navvab's school and was recognized as a professional khananda. His performance was admired outside the Azeri community. In 1911 he was invited by the Armenian club Obschestvennoe sobranie to give a concert in Tiflis (nowadays Tbilisi, Georgia), first one in a series of remarkable concerts given by Shushinski in this city in the next 8 years. The money made off these concerts was donated to various Azeri publishing houses and spent on training young singers in vocal arts. In 1913 a vinyl record was released in Kiev containing, among others, several folk pieces by Seyid Shushinski. In 1919 he moved to Baku.

== Career in the Soviet period ==
After Sovietization Shushinski was a soloist of a drama theatre in Baku, and in 1926–1933 he taught at the Azerbaijan State Conservatoire. In 1933, along with Jahan Talyshinskaya, he founded the Oriental Music Ensemble, which toured Russia, Ukraine, and Kazakhstan. In 1933–1938 he worked as the artistic director of the Fizuli State Drama Theatre, still continuing to give concerts in Baku. In 1939–1960 Shushinski was a soloist with the Azerbaijan State Philharmonic Society. In his last years he was a mugham opera consultant at the Azerbaijan State Academic Opera and Ballet Theatre.
