= Azerbaijan State Academic Philharmonic Hall =

Concert hall in Baku, Azerbaijan

Muslim Magomayev Azerbaijan State Academic Philharmonic Hall
- Müslüm Maqomayev adına Azərbaycan Dövlət Akademik Filarmoniyası
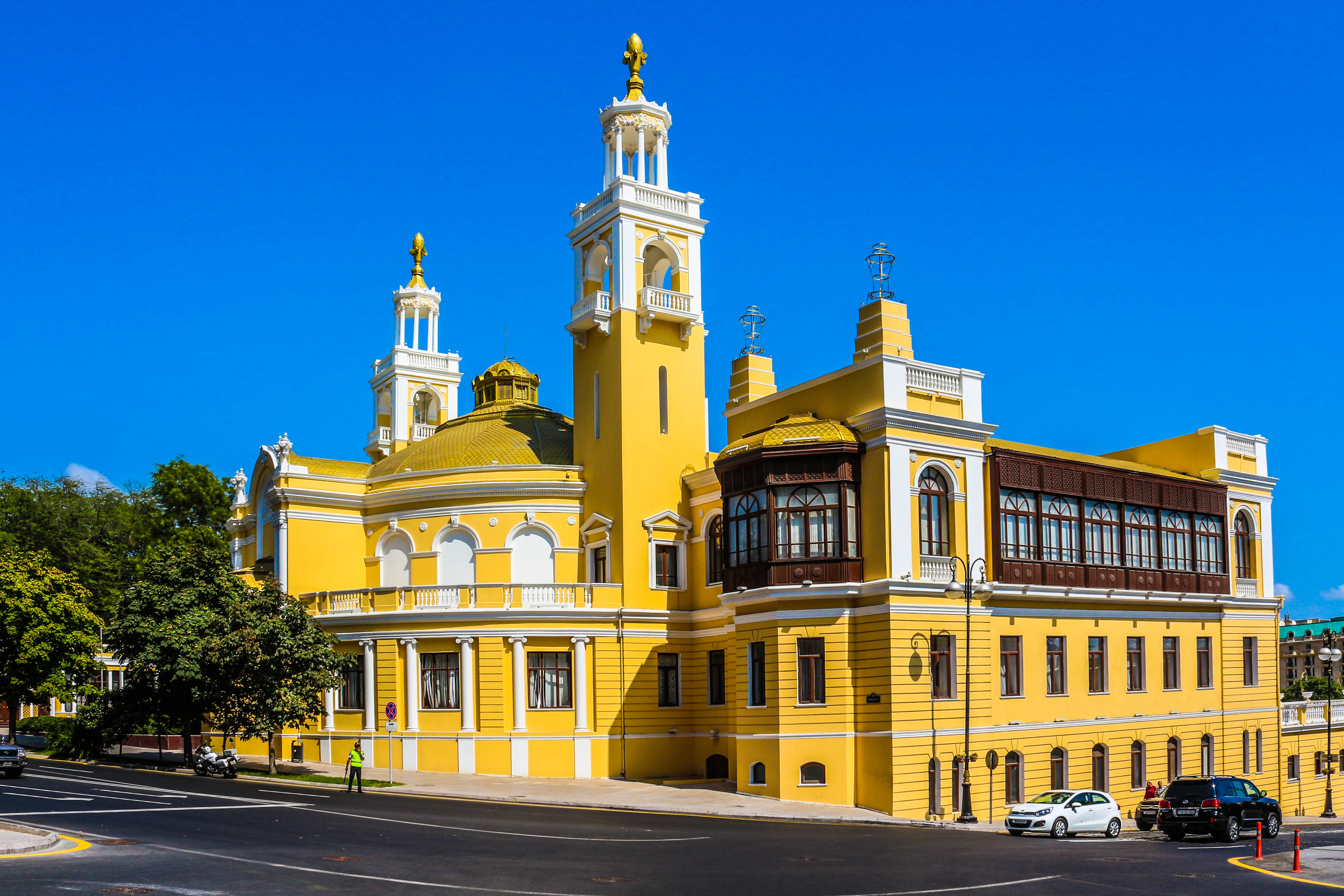
- Interactive map of Muslim Magomayev Azerbaijan State Academic Philharmonic Hall
- Location: Baku, Azerbaijan
- Coordinates: 40.3664°N 49.8350°E
- Capacity: 1,100 (Summer Hall); 610 (Winter Hall)

Construction
- Built: 1910–1912
- Opened: 1912; 27 January 2004
- Renovated: 1937, November 2002–2004
- Closed: 1995
- Architect: Gabriel Ter-Mikelov

Website
- filarmoniya.az

The Muslim Magomayev Azerbaijan State Academic Philharmonic Hall (Azerbaijani: Müslüm Maqomayev adına Azərbaycan Dövlət Akademik Filarmoniyası), located in Baku, is a concert hall in Azerbaijan. Since 2006 Murad Adigozalzade is the director of the Azerbaijan State Academic Philharmonic Hall.

The building was designed by Gabriel Ter-Mikelov, an architect of Armenian descent, and was constructed in 1910–1912.

== History ==
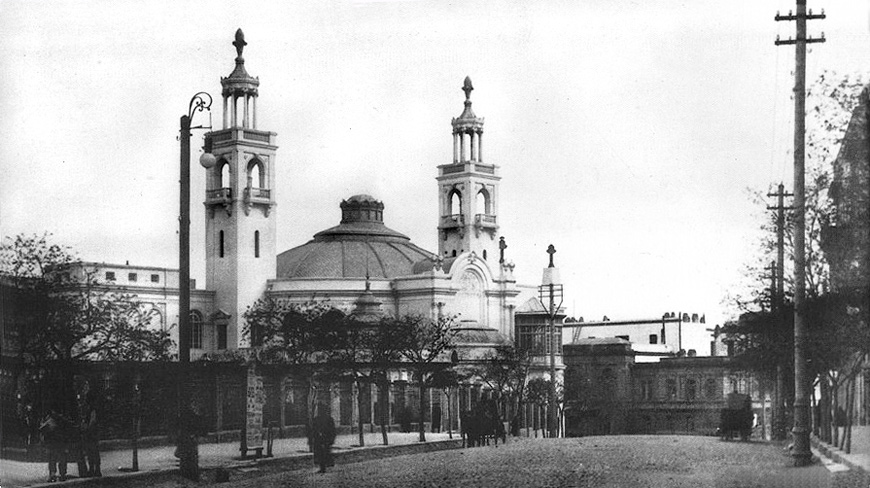
The Philharmonic Hall in the 20th century

The Azerbaijan State Academic Philharmonic Hall was constructed throughout 1910–1912 at the request of the city elite and designed by the Soviet architect of Armenian descent Gabriel Ter-Mikelov in the Italian Renaissance (exterior) and German Rococo (interior) styles. Its design was inspired by the architectural style of buildings within the Monte-Carlo Casino, particularly l'Opéra de Monte-Carlo. The society (known as the Summer Center for Public Gatherings prior to 1936) was originally organized as a club for the wealthy of Baku, who attended it for banquets and entertainment. During the Russian Civil War it served as a place for public rallies.

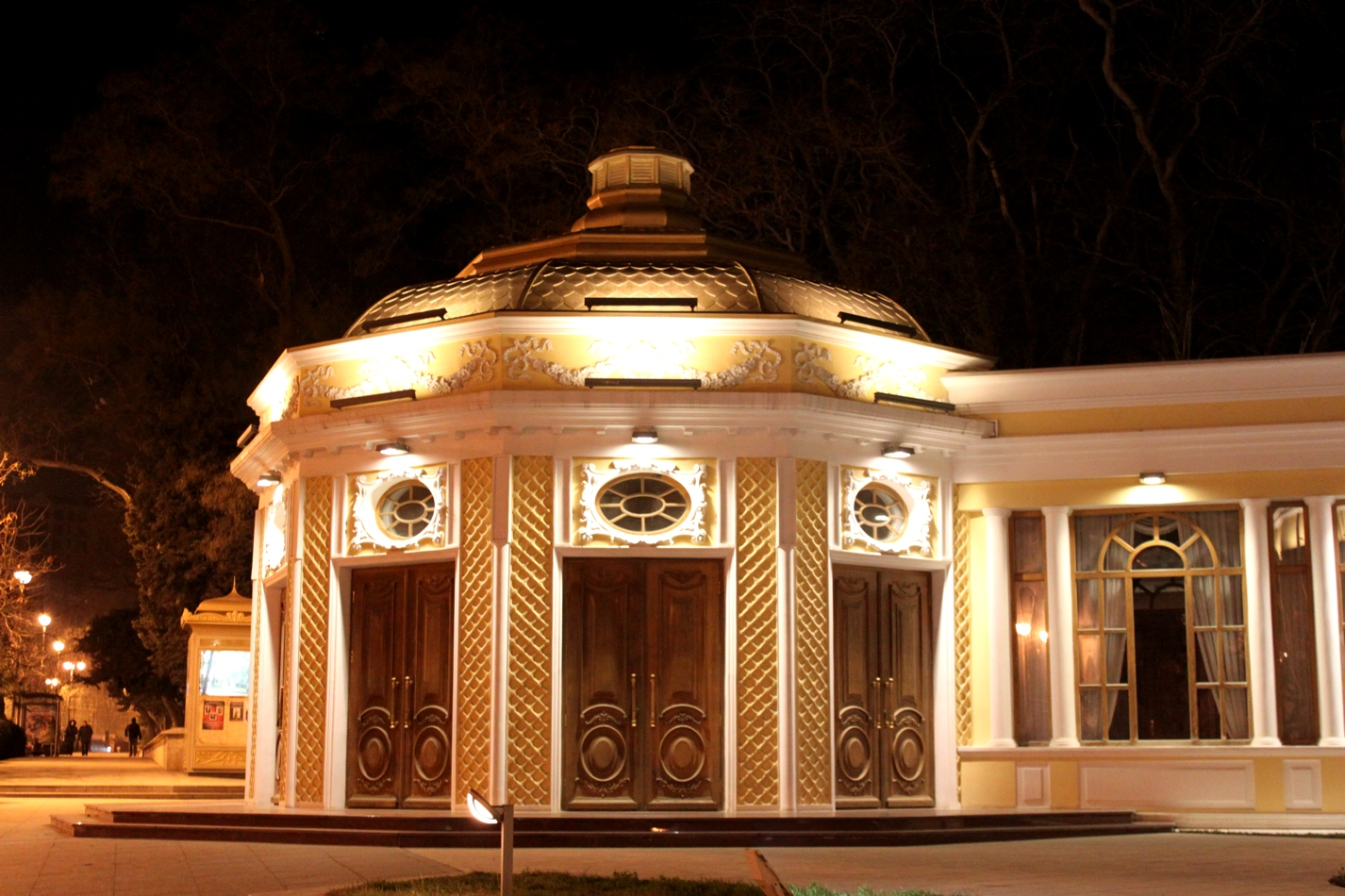
Side doors to the Philharmonic Hall facing Istiglaliyyat street

From 1918 to 1920, the meetings of the first parliament of the Azerbaijan Democratic Republic were held here.

In 1936, the club was reorganized into a residence for the Philharmonic society, aimed at promoting Azerbaijani classical and folk music. Throughout 1936-1937, the building was restored. On 11 August 1937, after the building underwent renovation, it was named after the composer Muslim Magomayev.

In 1995, the hall was closed down for the more than 8 years for another renovation. However, no restoration works were performed for the most part of that period, much to the discontent of many residents of Baku. Azerbaijan's Minister of Culture explained such delay by the fact that underground waters had damaged the base of the building over time. The restoration works resumed due to President Heydar Aliyev's special decree. The opening ceremony of the newly renovated building was held on January 27, 2004. Several famous people attended the ceremony, like President Ilham Aliyev, former minister of culture Polad Bulbuloglu, outstanding cellist Mstislav Rostropovich, professor Ferhad Badalbayli.

Beginning from 2007, International Mstislav Rostropovich Festival is held in December in Azerbaijan's Philharmonic Hall. A festival organized by Mstislav Rostropovich and dedicated to the 100th anniversary of Dmitri Shostakovich's birthday in 2006 was the basis of this festival.

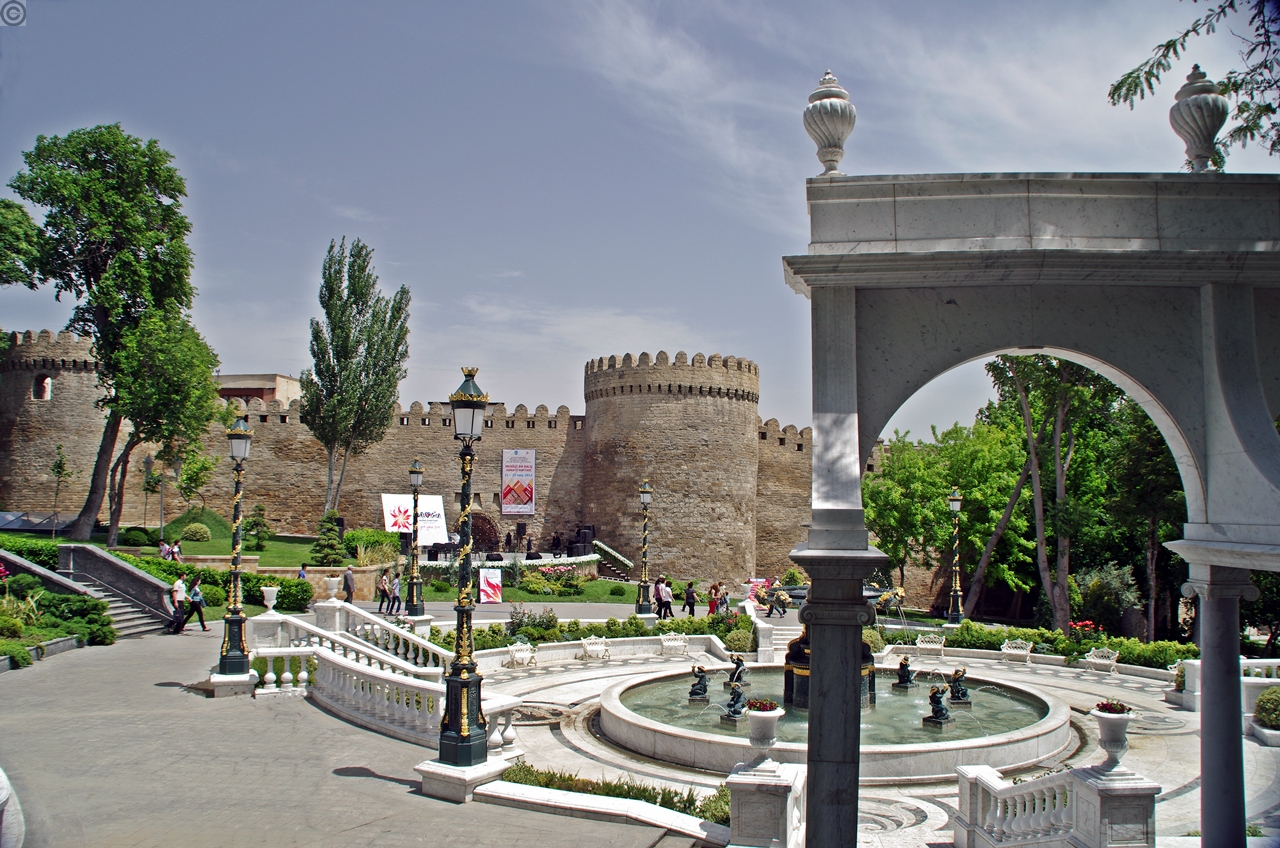
The Philharmonic Garden

== Structure ==
The main building consists of the Summer Hall (1100 seats) and the Winter Hall (610 seats) joined by a single stage. The society affiliates 7 performing groups, namely:

- The Azerbaijan State Symphony Orchestra
- The Azerbaijan State Choir Capella
- The Azerbaijan State Chamber Orchestra
- The Azerbaijan State Piano Trio
- The Azerbaijan State String Quartet
- The Azerbaijan State Folk Song and Dance Ensemble
- The Azerbaijan State Orchestra of Folk Instruments

== Philharmonic Garden ==
The garden of the Philharmonic hall, sometimes called Governor's Park, was established in 1830 next to Baku fortress. It was extended throughout 1860-1870s to 4.6 hectares (11 acres) and originally called Mikhaelovsky Garden, after the governor. In the early 20th century, there were plans to create a concert hall in the park, but the necessary felling of trees led to objections. Therefore, summer pavilion was built. The park was renovated in the 1970s and then in 2007.

== See also ==
- List of concert halls
