= Khan Shushinski =

Azerbaijani khananda folk singer (1901–1979)

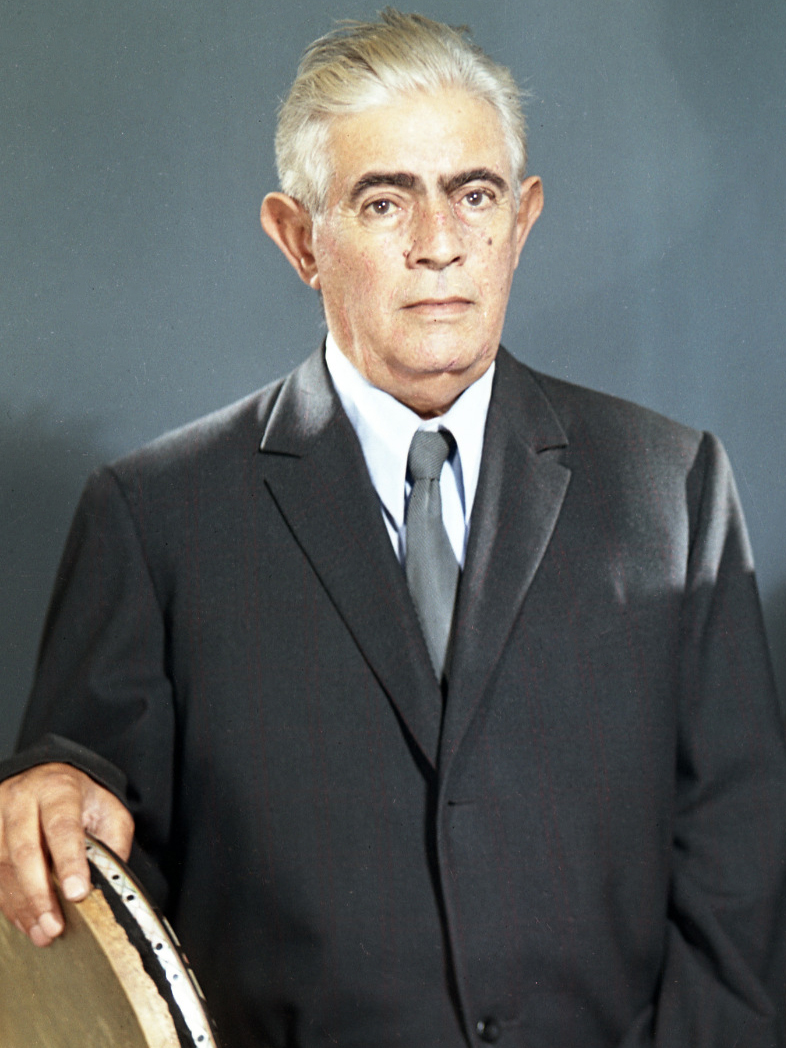

Background information
- Born: Isfandiyar Javanshir; 20 August 1901; Shusha, Elisabethpol Governorate (now part of Azerbaijan)
- Died: 18 March 1979 (aged 77) Baku, Azerbaijan
- Genres: Folk
- Years active: 1918–1979

Khan Shushinski (Azerbaijani: Xan Şuşinski), born Isfandiyar Aslan oglu Javanshir (20 August 1901, Shusha – 18 March 1979, Baku), was an Azerbaijani khananda folk singer.

== Life ==
Despite Shushinski's relation to the khans of Karabakh, his stage name derives from an episode in his adolescence. In 1918, he and his mugham teacher, Islam Abdullayev attended a wedding in the village of Novruzlu (today in the Agdam Rayon of Azerbaijan), where guests listened to a gramophone record of the Iranian singer Abul Hasan Khan performing the Kurd Shahnaz variety of mugham. After the song, young Isfandiyar was asked to re-sing that song live. Despite the complicated nature of Kurd Shahnaz, his performance impressed the guests to the point of them comparing Isfandiyar to Abul Hasan Khan and saying, "Now, here's the real Khan."

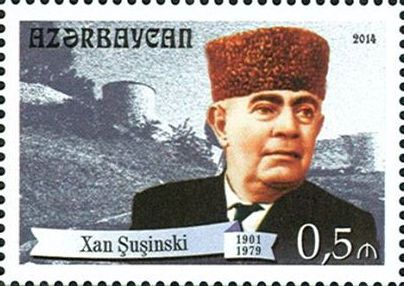
Khan Shushinski on Azerbaijani postage stamp

Shushinski made his first appearance in Baku in 1923, at the Azerbaijan State Philharmonic Hall. He spent the next two decades touring cities of the South Caucasus, gaining huge popularity for his voice and being often mentioned in the local media, as well as in the poem Azerbaijan by Samad Vurgun. In 1944, a year after he became People's Artist of Azerbaijan, he visited Tehran (along with four other cities in Iran) and was invited to perform at a banquet organized by Shah Mohammad Reza Pahlavi.

In 1960, he created the "Mugham studio" in the Azerbaijan State Philharmonic, where he gave private lessons to the younger hanendes.

Khan Shushinski became known as a talented composer after writing a number of songs, the most famous of them being Shushanin daghlari ("The Mountains of Shusha"), dedicated to his native city. He later taught vocal arts at the Zeynally College of Music in Baku.

== Awards ==
- People's Artist of the Azerbaijan SSR (1943)
- Order of the Badge of Honour (1959)
- Jubilee Medal "In Commemoration of the 100th Anniversary of the Birth of Vladimir Ilyich Lenin"

== Legacy ==
The Khan Shushinsky Foundation operates in Azerbaijan to perpetuate the singer's name. The director of the foundation is the singer's daughter, Bayimkhanim Verdiyeva. There is a street named after him in Baku.
