= Mugham triads =

Azerbaijani music triad who play traditional tar, kamancheh and daf instruments

Mugham trio or mugham triads (Azerbaijani: Muğam üçlüyü) is a classical ensemble of three Azerbaijani national musical instruments: tar, kamancheh, and qaval performers. It is a traditional musical group of Azerbaijani musicians who perform the mugham repertoire and represent the ensemble of khanandas and sazandas.

The performance of the muğam trio is called a complete vocal-instrumental mugham dastgah. The dastgah represents the entire mugham, including its form, all sections and branches, as well as the sequential performance of each section or diringah. The sections that make up the mugham composition are improvised recitative with melody, which determine the musical-poetic content of the work. These are alternated with songs that have a precise rhythm, as well as dance episodes. The song episodes are called tasnif, while the dance episodes are called rang.

== Structure ==
As the name suggests, the muğam trio consists of three people. This ensemble is the only one that performs the complete muğam in dastgah form with all its intricacies delivered to the listener.

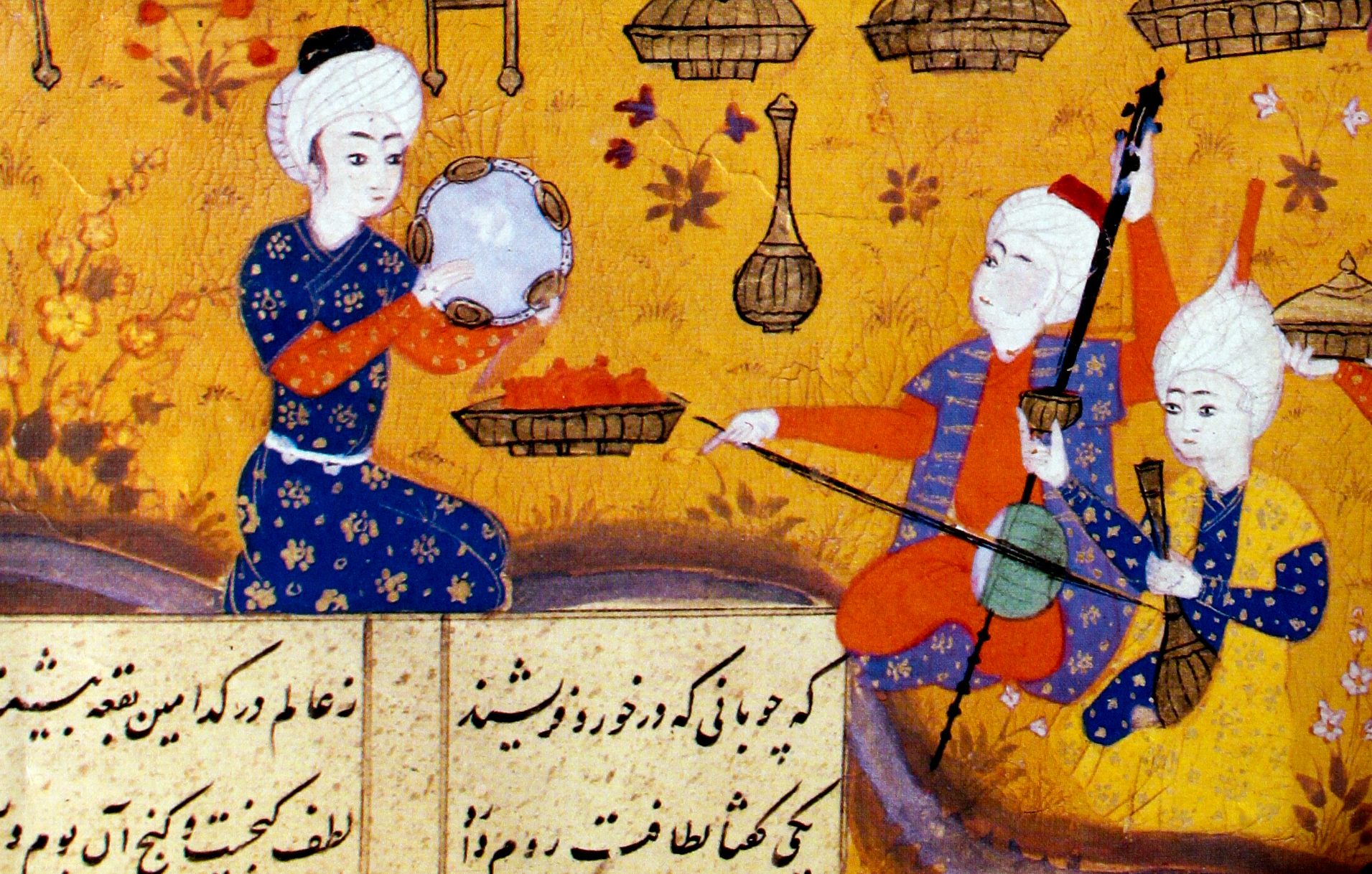
"The mugham trio depicted in a miniature from the 16th century, which was based on Nizami Ganjavi's "Khosrow and Shirin" poem

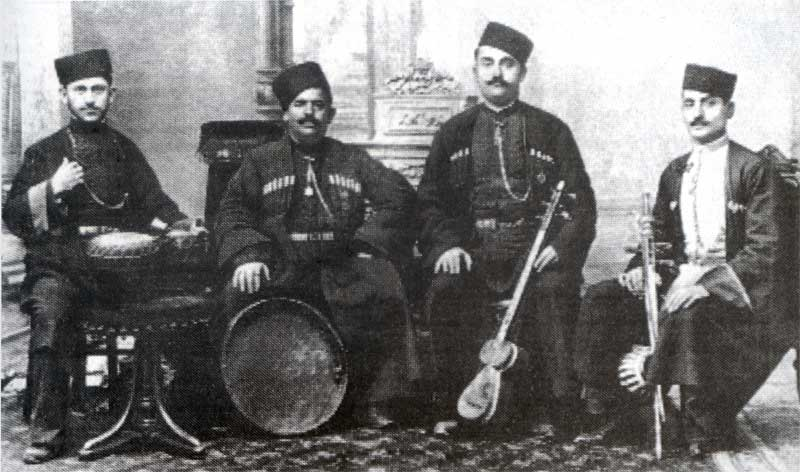
Mugham ensemble including qoshanaqarah – Bulbuljan's ensemble, end of the 19th century

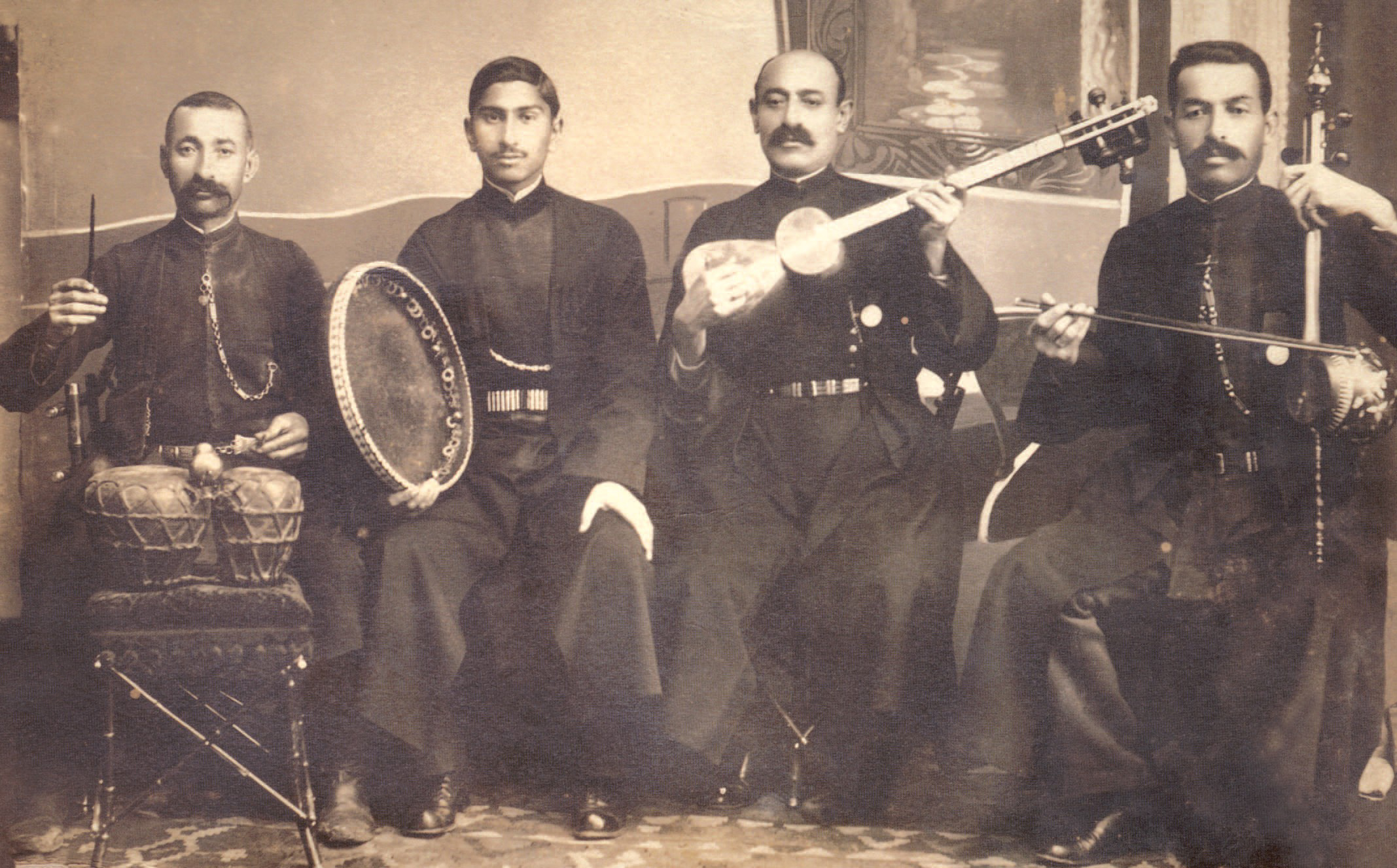
Mugham ensemble including qoshanaqarah – Seyid Shushinski's ensemble, 1916.

In the early times, the sazanda (ensemble of musicians) used to include the tar, kamancheh, and balaban for playing tasnif and rangs. When playing tunes and color pieces, the daira and qoshanaqara were used. After famous musician Mirza Sadiq Asad oghlu made improvements to the tar, the need for the loud qoshanaqara disappeared and it was replaced with the soft and subtle sound of the shepherd's flute (qaval) held by khananda. As a result, this ensemble became composed of only three people: the tar player, kamancheh player, and khananda, and since the second half of the 19th century, this trio has been active until today. Their role in the development of Azerbaijani folk music and the creation of the mugham performance school is immeasurable.

The main performer in the trio is the khananda who plays the qaval. According to their personal taste and abilities, they create compositions. In other words, it is the khananda who decides which branches and tunes should be included in the dastgah, their volume, rang, or the placement of the tasnif. When performing the mugham, khananda brings the qaval close to their face, ensuring that its sound is directed towards the listeners and resonates. During the performance of tunes with different colors and tunings, the khananda competes with and accompanies the qaval.

The second participant of the trio is the tarzen (Azerbaijani: tarzən), and his instrument is the tar. When the khananda sings, the tar player accompanies him with the organ point, playing solo mugham pieces between the vocal lines and modulating to new modes. The performance of the dastgah is a dialogue between the khananda and the tar player, as the tar initially plays any given gusha (section) instrumentally before handing it over to the khananda. In the instrumental pieces that alternate with the vocal sections of the mugham, the tar player is the sole soloist. The tar player must have a keen sense of ensemble, supporting the khananda while also being sensitive to his individual capabilities and knowing when to breathe.

The third participant of the trio plays the kamancheh which has a somewhat limited function in mugham performance when compared to the qaval and tar. The kamancheh player accompanies the kamancheh and tar player and serves to bring about the complex expression style of mugham. In addition to that, while the tar imitates the khananda, the kamancheh's imitation of the tar creates a complex expression style called "two-fold imitation" in the language of musicology. However, the kamancheh is not just an accompanist. In the most lyrical and passionate episodes of mugham, after the khananda's declamatory passages, the solos of the kamancheh sound as expressive and impactful as the human voice.

== Musical instruments used ==
Qaval is a wind instrument. It is made of a cylindrical body with a width of 60–75 mm and a diameter of 350–450 mm, covered with fish skin on one end. Thin rings are carved into the inside of the cylinder, and they produce sound when played. It is widely used in Mugam performance and is an attribute of the khananda. The Khananda participates in the precise rhythmic music episodes of the trio while playing the qaval. Therefore, the qaval instrument has been transformed into an attribute of the khananda.

Tar is a stringed instrument played with a pick, producing shimmering and melodious sounds. Its body resembles a figure eight and consists of a large and small bowl. The front part of the bowls is covered with skin. The small bowl has twenty-two strings called "Arm," which are tied to animal intestines called "qrif." The strings of the tar pass over the top of the instrument and are tied to the upper part of the bowl with the help of "ashug" from above and to the metal anchor at the bottom of the larger bowl from below. The tar is the leading instrument in the mugham trio.

The Azerbaijani tar used in the Mugham trio is unique in its structure, design, and artistic and technical possibilities. The modern Azerbaijani tar with eleven strings has a wide range of sounds and rich performance capabilities. The instrument was developed in the second half of the 19th century by the renowned Azerbaijani artist Mirza Sadig, known as Sadigjan, based on the Iranian tar. He increased the number of strings from five to eleven, slimmed down the body, raised the bridge, and created the Azerbaijani tar, which greatly increased the instrument's tonal and technical capabilities.

Kamancheh is a stringed musical instrument with a pear-shaped body covered with a stretched membrane or skin. It is one of the oldest musical instruments in Azerbaijan and the only bowed string instrument among Azerbaijani folk instruments. The name of kamancheh is mentioned in Nizami Ganjavi's "Khosrow and Shirin" poem, and it is depicted in miniatures of Tabriz art (Aghamirak Isfahani, Mir Seyid Ali). Kamancheh is mainly made of walnut wood. The instrument consists of a wine bowl-shaped resonator, a circular neck, a "kelleh" (the part where the "ashiqs" rest their chin), and a steel rod called "sish." A metal brace attached to the lower part of the body allows the kamancheh to be played on the knee. The metal brace also holds the four strings that pass over the instrument's arms and body from the top. The front of the body is covered with skin. The instrument's sound is produced by drawing the bow across the strings. The bow is made of a horsehair-covered wooden stick with a metal ring attached to its end. The total length of the instrument is between 65 and 90 cm. The kamancheh used to have 1–3 strings, but now it has four. The notes "lya" in the small octave, "mi" and "lya" in the first octave, and "mi" in the second octave are played on the instrument. The range of the instrument is from the "lya" note in the small octave to the "mi" note in the third octave (sometimes solo). The kamancheh has a delicate and tender sound.

Musical instruments of mugham trio

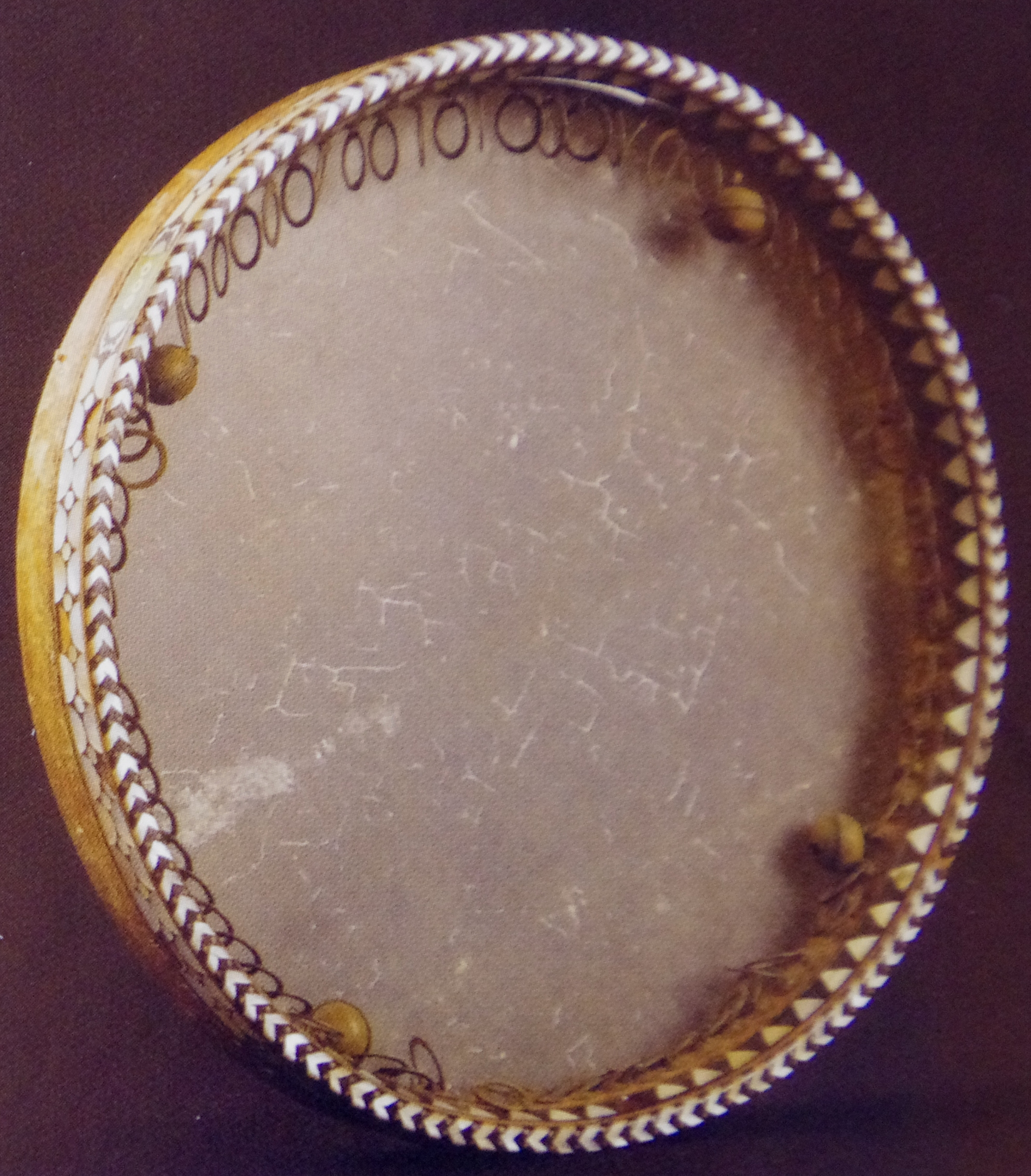
Qaval

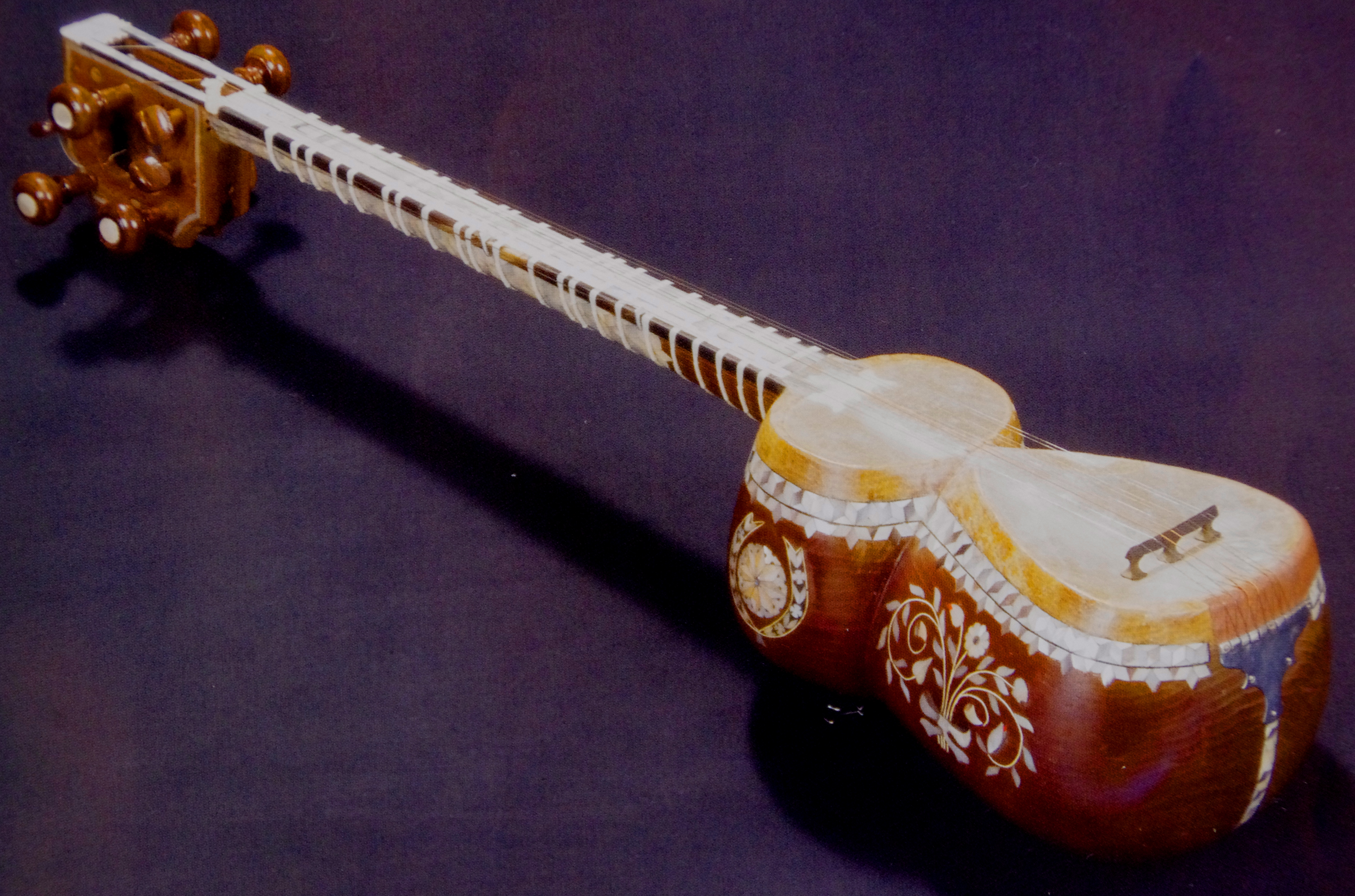
Tar

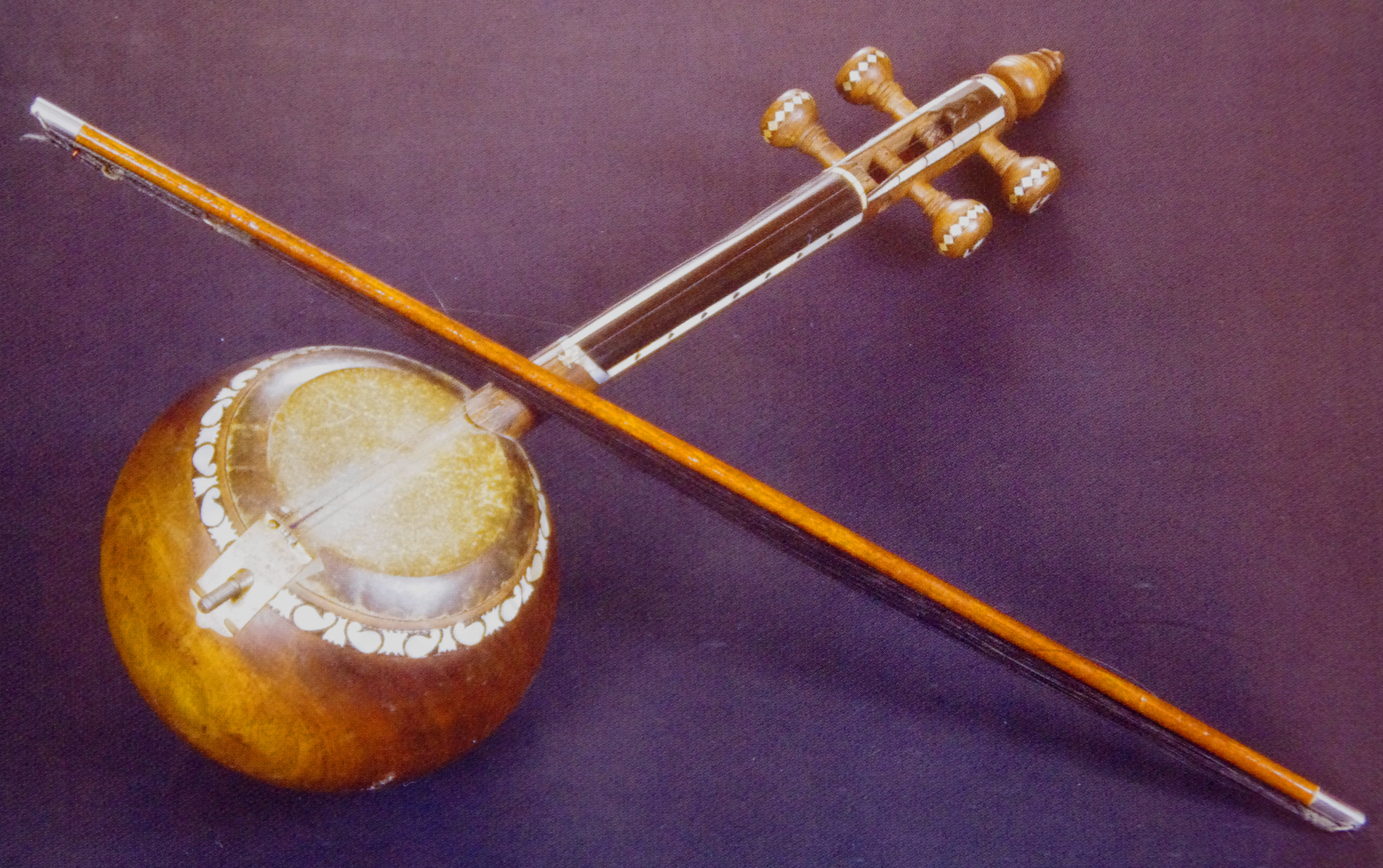
Kamancheh

== Famous trios ==
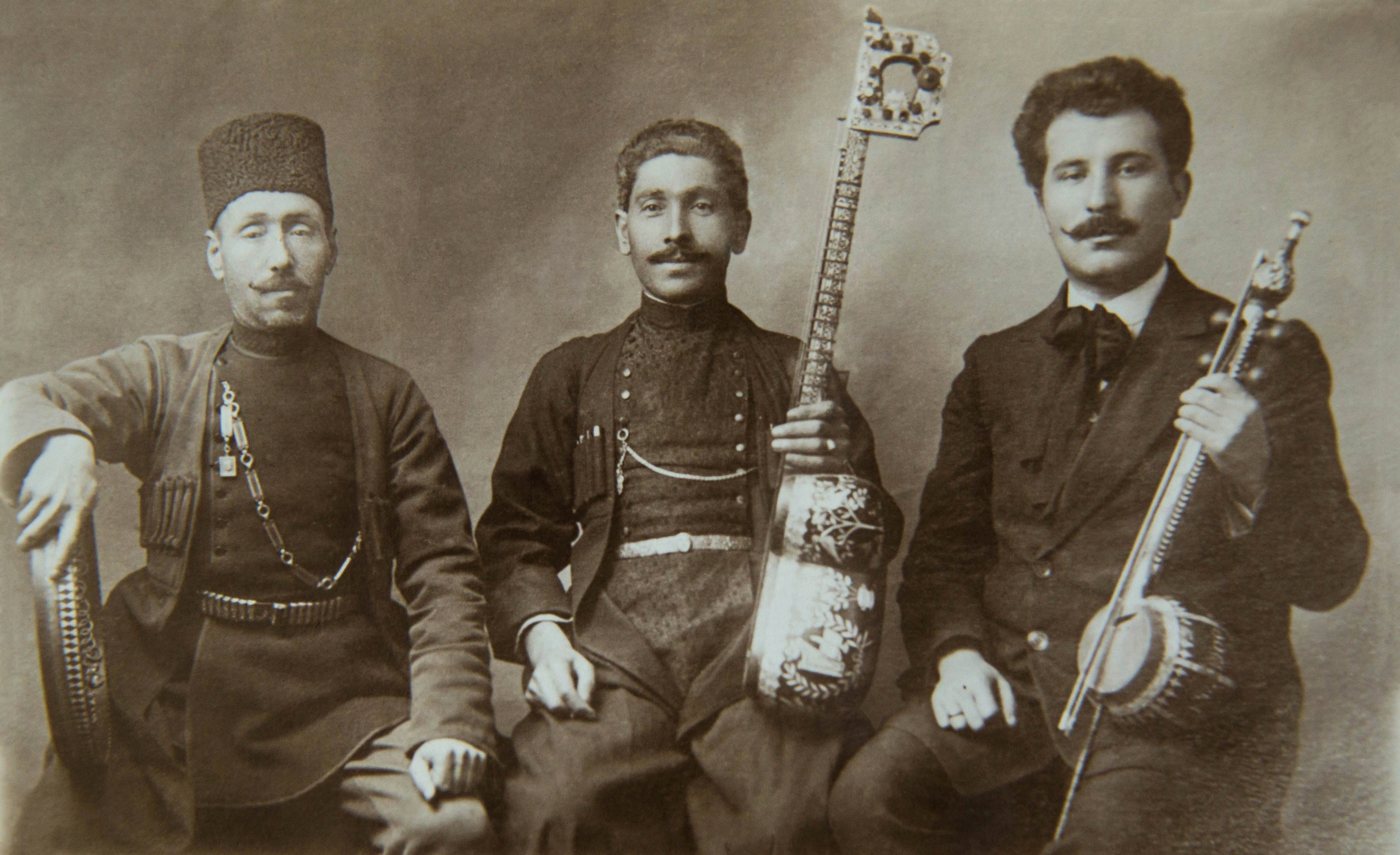
Kechachioghlu Muhammed's ensemble in Warsaw in 1912

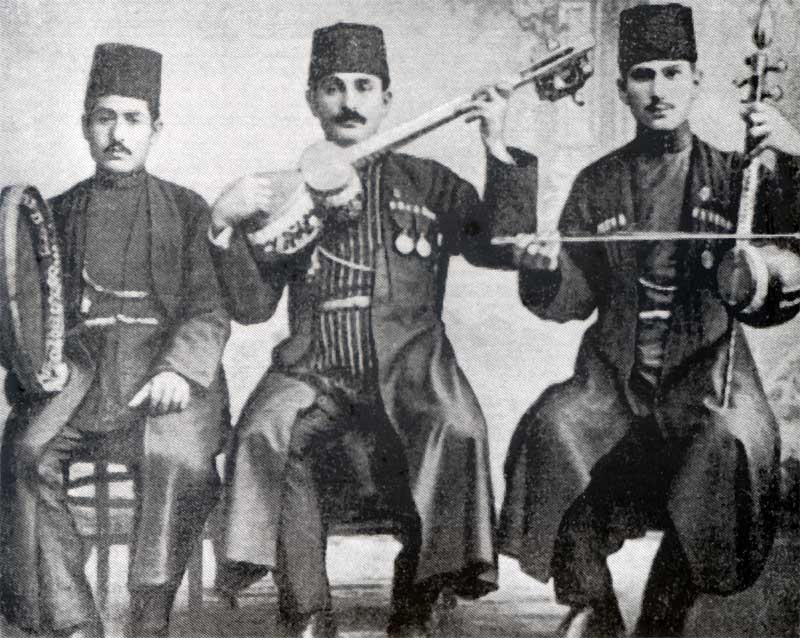
Mugham trio – Segah Islam's ensemble, in 1912 Baku. From left to right: Islam Abdullayev, Shirin Akhundov, Levon Garakhanov.

In the 19th century, the famous tar player Mirza Sadig accompanied the great musician of the East, Haji Husu, playing the kamancheh first with Ata Bagdagul oglu and then with the trio of Shusha khananda Mashadi Isi. In 1880, he was invited to the wedding of Prince Mozaffar ad-Din Shah Qajar, son of Naser al-Din Shah Qajar, in Tabriz. Many artists played and performed at the wedding, but Haji Husu was recognized as the best khananda and Sadigjan was recognized as the best tar player, and they were awarded the prestigious "Shiri-Khurshid" order.

In the early 20th century, Kechachioghlu Muhammed's ensemble was one of the famous mugham trios. The ensemble even performed in Warsaw, the capital of Poland, in 1912. At that time, the ensemble consisted of not only Mohammad himself, but also the tar player Gurban Pirimov and the kamancheh player Sasha Okanezashvili.

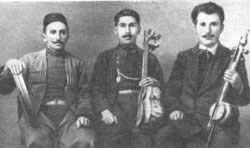
The trio created by the master khananda Jabbar Garyagdioglu and kamancheh player Sasha Oganezashvili together with tar player Gurban Pirimov

In the 1930s, Jabbar Garyaghdioglu performed "Heyrati" mugham (accompanied by Gurban Pirimov on tar and Qilman Salahov on kamancheh)..

It should be noted the activity of the mugham trio created together by tar player Gurban Pirimov, master khananda Jabbar Garyaghdioglu, and kamancheh player Sasha Okanezashvili. This mugham trio, active for up to 20 years starting from 1905, was a special stage in their creativity. This trio became known not only in Azerbaijan and the Caucasus but also throughout Central Asia. They became famous during that period of activity, made concert tours to various countries, and their performances were recorded on gramophone records. In this regard, it is possible to note the records written by "Potte," "Sport-Rekord," and "Gramophone" companies in the cities of Riga, Warsaw, and Kiev between 1906 and 1916. It should also be noted that in these rare records, Gurban Pirimov accompanied not only Jabbar Garyaghdioglu but also other khanandas such as Kechachioghlu Muhammed, Mashadi Mammad Farzaliyev, Islam Abdullayev, Alasgar Abdullayev, and Seyid Shushinski.

In the 1970s, the mugham trio emerged in a new format. The famous composer, pianist, and founder of the jazz-mugham style, Vagif Mustafazadeh, created the "Mugham" jazz trio in 1977. He led this trio and they became laureates of festivals held in Tallinn and Tbilisi.

In 1987, the first mugham trio was created at the Azerbaijan State Philharmonic Society named after M. Magomayev, called the "Jabbar Garyaghdioglu mugham trio". The ensemble consisted of People's Artists Mohlat Muslumov (tar player), Fakhraddin Dadashov (kamancheh player), and Zahid Guliyev (khananda). In subsequent years, this mugam trio collaborated with many khanandas and went on concert tours to many countries around the world. Their performances were recorded on various albums released in foreign countries.

In 1992, the trio of khananda Aghakhan Abdullayev, tar player Zamiq Aliyev, and kamancheh player Adalat Vezirov created the "Zulfu Adigozelov mugham trio". This trio performed at UNESCO events in Iran and Iraq related to the 500th anniversary of the poet Muhammad Fuzuli. In 1997, Aghakhan Abdullayev was replaced by an unknown female student, Simara Imanova, and they performed under the name "East Nightingale mugham trio". The trio participated in the "Melodies of the East" festival in Samarkand, Uzbekistan in 1997, and among 46 musicians from different countries, they were awarded the highest prize, the "Gran-Pri". The trio's successful performance and bright victory were acknowledged by the then-President of Azerbaijan, Heydar Aliyev, who awarded all three with the honorary title of "Honored Artist". After that, the state began to invite this mugam trio to national events and provide them with continuous support.

In 2005, the "Khan Shushinski mugham trio" led by honored artist and laureate of the Union of Composers, tar musician Rafiq Rustamov, performed in Aghdam during a concert tour, giving performances in the cities of France, Lille and Lyon for 5 days. After the concerts, the musicians also held master classes for students at the Lille Conservatory. In general, France is one of the countries where young mugham trios from Azerbaijan perform the most. For example, in May 2010, at the invitation of the Embassy of Azerbaijan in France and with the support of the Ministry of Culture and Tourism of the Republic of Azerbaijan, the "Vefa Orucova mugham trio" – laureate of the International Mugham Festival, young khananda Vefa Orucova, tar musician Rufat Hasanov, and kamancheh player Elnur Mikayilov participated in the 1000th anniversary celebrations in France.

Alim Gasimov, who is considered one of the most impressive performers of the mugham art, and leads the famous mugham trio, has introduced mugham art to France and other foreign countries on numerous occasions. He started performing with the Mansurov brothers – Tar player Jamal and kamancheh player Elshan – in 1989.

The "Aypara" mugham trio, which has been active since December 2009, has become the young representative of Azerbaijani mugham by participating in national and international competitions, festivals and events. The performers of this trio, who are the young successors of the famous "Karabakh" mugham trio, are Aytan Maharramova (khananda), Adalat Behbudov (tar) and Perviz Farhadov (kamancheh), all of whom are students of People's Artist Mansum Ibrahimov, Honored Artist Elchin Hashimov, and Honored Artist Elnur Ahmadov, respectively. They achieved great success by winning the first prize at the 2011 II Republic Mugham competition.

As a result of increasing interest of women in this field, several mugham trios consisting only of women have also been formed. Sakina Ismayilova created the first all-female mugham trio in 1989 and this small collective has performed in several foreign countries. Their first tour was to France in 1992, where they achieved great success. Later, this trio performed concerts in the UK, Italy, Iran, Turkey, the Netherlands, India, and other countries and received several diplomas and awards. These concerts were widely covered in the mass media of those countries.

== In different fields ==
=== Culture ===
The mugham trio holds a special role in Azerbaijan's national wedding customs. For example, traditional mughams play a special role in the peak stage of the boy's wedding ceremony in Lankaran, which is the most responsible stage. Often, musicians who are invited to play at the wedding are first invited to the village tea house, where they are given a good place to perform. After that, all the elders and dignitaries of the village would give their consent, and those musicians would be entrusted with performing at the wedding. The mugham trio would perform at the boy's wedding, especially on the second day, with a "concert program" dedicated to the wedding. The second night of the boy's wedding was considered a responsible night for the mugham performers, as the elders, respectable men, and dignitaries of the village would gather to listen to the mugams. Since the 1950s, these weddings have frequently invited the mugham trio in Lankaran and its villages. In recent years, Tariyel Aliyev, a kamancheh player and the initiator and active participant of the newly opened mugham theater in Lankaran, has said this about these weddings:

They also reserved a room for our mugham trio. We would rest and practice there depending on our needs. An hour before we entered the assembly, instead of the black clarinet, the low-pitched balaban would be played. This created an opportunity for the delicate sound of our mugham trio to be heard.

This group, which used to participate in wedding and other festive gatherings, now performs in theaters and concert halls in modern times. In fact, the history of this change goes back to the end of the 19th century. At that time, the art of singing had moved from gatherings, weddings, and festivals to theaters and concert halls, and musical performances began to emerge. This idea was first realized by the distinguished writer Abdurrahim bey Hagverdiyev, who was then a student at the University of St. Petersburg, in Shusha. In 1897, a musical performance titled "On the Grave of Majnun Layla" was organized with his leadership. This was the theatrical musical interpretation of the last part of the poem "Layla and Majnun" by the great Azerbaijani poet Muhammad Fuzuli. For the first time, theater, poetry, and mugham were brought together here. The performers, who were mugham singers, performed certain parts of the poem's text on the mugham. The famous mugham singers of that time, Jabbar Qaryagdioglu and Ahmed Agdamski, played the roles, and they were accompanied by the traditional mugham trio led by Mirza Sadig Asad oglu. Onların ifası Mirzə Sadıq Əsəd oğlunun başçılıq etdiyi ənənəvi muğam üçlüyü ilə müşayiət olunurdu.

=== Art ===
"Mugham trio" is a subject widely explored by Azerbaijani painters (such as Togrul Narimanbekov's work "Mugham") and sculptors (such as Zakir Ahmadov). Additionally, clothing collections featuring garments inspired by this trio of instruments – the qaval, tar, and kamancheh – have been showcased and presented. Moreover, for instance, embroidery artist Mehriban Khalilzade has created the work "Mugham trio" using needles. Samadagha Jafarov's "Mugham trio" photograph taken on a rocky ledge in this subject area also draws attention.

=== Cinema ===
Mugham trios have been featured in a number of films. For example, in the 1956 Azerbaijani film "If Not That One, Then This One", a trio consisting of Khan Shushinski, Bahram Mansurov, and Talat Bakıkhanov played a role.

=== Philately ===
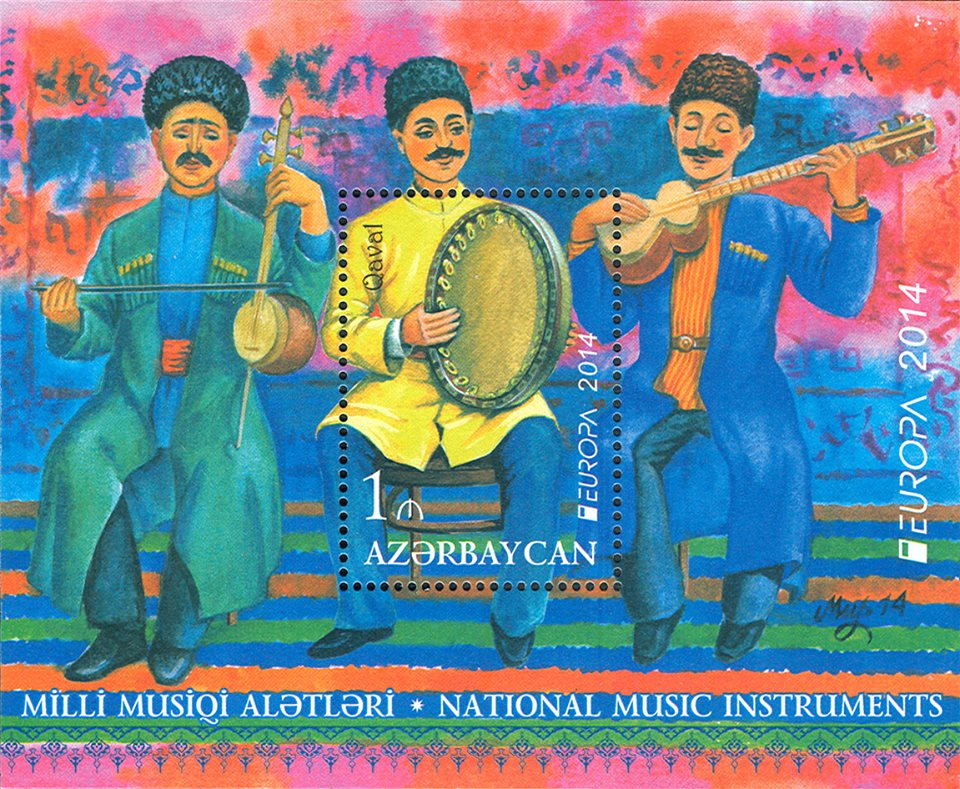
The postage stamp of Azerbaijan issued in 2014, featuring the depiction of the mugham trio.

On 17 February 2014, a postage stamp featuring the image of the mugham trio was released as an Azerbaijani philatelic product by Azermarka. The part of the image featuring the qaval was also separately released as a postage stamp.

=== Economy ===
The musical instruments of the mugham trio were depicted on Azerbaijan's 1 manat banknotes issued by the Central Bank of the Republic of Azerbaijan in 2005 and 2009, and on Azerbaijan's 1 gapik coin issued in 2006.

== Interesting facts ==
During his trip to Paris, the famous Azerbaijani millionaire and philanthropist Haji Zeynalabdin Taghiyev was accompanied not only by his business team but also by the mugham trio. He took a group of musicians with him on his spiritual demand to Europe, not for the sake of fame or to impress foreigners, but for personal reasons.

== Gallery ==
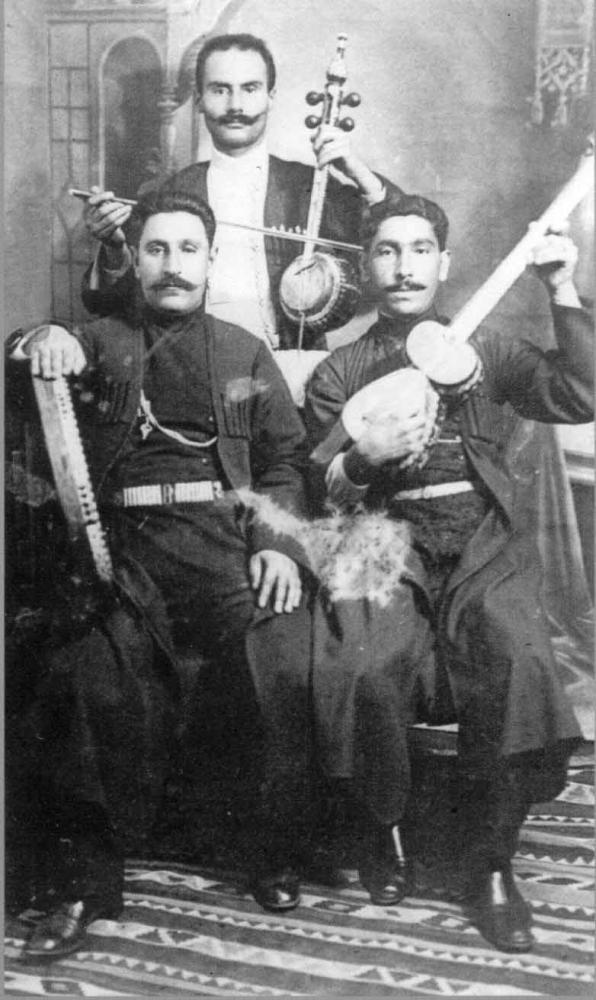
The ensemble of Meshedi Mehrali Farzeliyev consisting of muğam trio, Ganja, 1911.
