= Mashadi Zeynal =

Mashadi Zeynal Məşədi Zeynal
- Born: 1850s Karkijahan, Shusha uezd, Elizavetpol Governorate, Russian Empire
- Died: 1918; Baku, Azerbaijan Democratic Republic
- Genres: Mugham, folk
- Occupation: tar player

Mashadi Zeynal Hagverdiyev (Azerbaijani: Məşədi Zeynal Haqverdiyev; 1850s – 1918) was an Azerbaijani musician and one of the first tar players in Azerbaijani music.

== Biography ==
Mashadi Zeynal Hagverdiyev was born in the 1850s (according to some sources in 1861) in the village of Karkijahan of Shusha uezd. During his education years at Shusha Realni School, he grew up in the environment of Azerbaijani cultural figures such as Firidun bey Kocharli, Yusif bey Malikhagnazarov, Azad bey Amirov, Karim bey Mehmandarov, Najaf bey Vazirov, Abdurrahim bey Hagverdiyev and Jabbar Garyaghdioglu.

Mashadi took lessons from Ali Asgar and Sadigjan, well-known artists of his era, and participated in Shusha musical gatherings from a young age. For many years, he accompanied Shahnaz Abbas, Abdulbagi Zulalov, Chekmachi Mohammad, Mashadi Mammad Farzaliyev, Segah Islam, Majid Behbudov, and later Seyid Shushinski and others at public musical gatherings and "Oriental concerts" with his tar. He performed at the first "Oriental concerts" in Shusha.

In 1911–1918, Mashadi Zeynal performed as a tar player in opera and drama performances and charity nights in Baku, Tbilisi and Shusha, and accompanied singers Segah Islam, Seyid Shushinski, and Majid Behbudov. On 20 January 1907 he participated with other artists in a night by the Muslim Charitable Society dedicated to benefit the Muslims in-need. He was invited by Uzeyir Hajibeyov to opera performances, and in 1911 he played tar in the opera "Leyli and Majnun". On 13 March 1915 Mashadi played the "Rahab" mugam at the "Eastern Night" organized by the Nijat Society in Baku.

Mashadi Zeynal was one of the first solo tar players after Sadigjan in Azerbaijani music. In 1897, he played "Chahargah" at the charity night organized in Khandamirov's theatre in Shusha. This mugham is particularly distinguished in his performance. In addition, he is known as a soloist of "Zabul" mugham.

Tarzan Mashadi Zeynal died in Baku in 1918.
