= Islam Abdullayev =

Azerbaijani musician (1876–1964)

Islam Abdullayev İslam Abdullayev
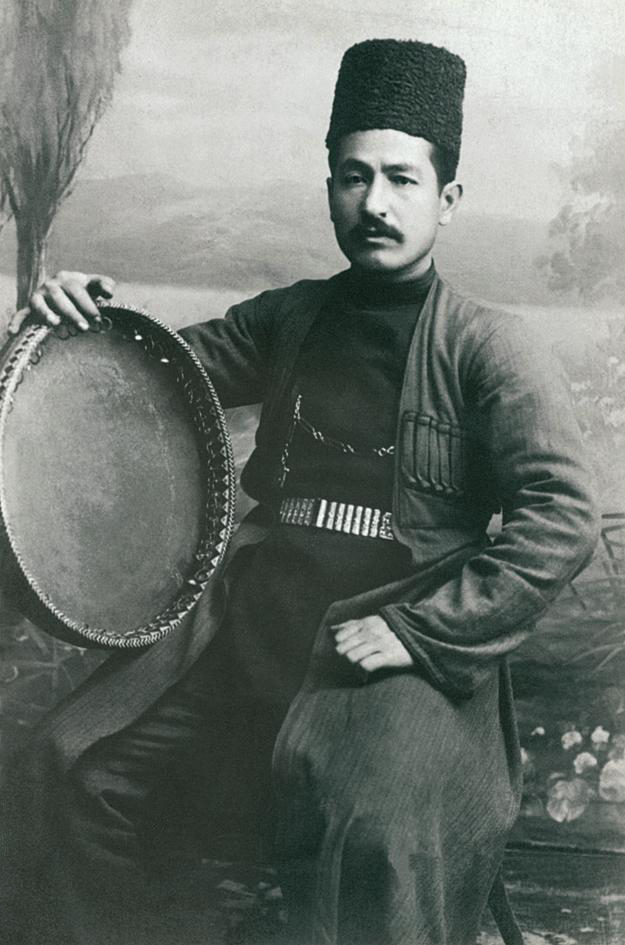

Background information
- Also known as: Segah Islam
- Born: İslam Əbdül oğlu Abdullayev; December 1876; Shusha, Elisabethpol Governorate, Russian Empire
- Origin: Azerbaijani
- Died: September 22, 1964 (aged 87) Baku, Azerbaijan SSR, USSR
- Genres: mugham
- Instrument: Daf

Islam Abdullayev (also known as Segah Islam) (Azerbaijani: İslam Abdullayev, December 1876 — 22 September 1964) was an Azerbaijani khananda, Honored Art Worker of the Azerbaijan SSR.

== Biography ==
Islam Abdullayev was born in December, 1876 in Shusha where he received his first education. In the history of Azerbaijani music, Islam Abdullayev is known as a unique performer of the Segah mugham.

Music scientist Mir Mohsun Navvab, who created the "Gathering of Singers" in Shusha in 1883 invited I.Abdullayev to this assembly. So he learned from such artists as Mir Mohsun Navvab, Haji Husu, Mashadi Isi, Mirza Mukhtar Mammadov, Dali Ismayil, and Keshtazly Hashim, and performed with the accompaniment of Sadigjan. The first Segah performance by Islam Abdullayev was at the wedding of Sadigjan's son, after which he became more famous. In 1901-1905, he performed with Gurban Pirimov in Karabakh and Ganja assemblies.

He was called "Segah Islam" by the people for his special enthusiasm and skillful singing of Segah mugham and all its variants - "Zabul-Segah", "Mirza Huseyn", "Orta Segah" and "Kharij Segah". In 1910-1915, the recording companies "Sport-Record" and "Extrafon" recorded Segah, Bayati-Qajar, Shahnaz, Shushtar and other classifications which were performed by Islam Abdullayev and recorded on vinyl.

Segah Islam was also a pedagogue. He played an important role as a mentor of singers like Khan Shushinski, Yagub Mammadov and Sahib Shukurov. He worked as the director of a music school in Shusha and organized an orchestra of folk instruments in Ganja. Shortly before the end of his life he moved to Aghdam, and taught mugham in a music school and became the teacher of many singers.

Abdullayev died on September 22, 1964, in Baku.

== Awards ==
- Honored Art Worker of the Azerbaijan SSR — 1949

== Literature ==
- Hüseynoğlu, Sərvaz (2017). Segah İslam (İslam Abdullayev) (in Azerbaijani). Bakı. p. 136.

== See also ==
- Shakili Alasgar
- Aghabala Abdullayev
- Gasim Abdullayev
