= Kharrat Gulu =

Kharrat Gulu Xarrat Qulu
- Born: 1823; Shusha, Russian Empire
- Died: 1883 (aged 59–60); Shusha, Shusha uezd, Elizavetpol Governorate, Russian Empire
- Occupation(s): poet, musicologist

Karbalayi Gulu Mahammad oghlu Azerbaijani: Kərbəlayı Qulu Məhəmməd oğlu; 1823–1883) was a musicologist, poet, founder of music school in Shusha.

== Biography ==
The founder of music school in Shusha, musicologist Karbalayi Gulu was born in 1823.

Kharrat Gulu used to attract young people with suitable voices for mugham gatherings in Shusha, teaching them mugham and how to sing it. He used to attract young people to the assembly he organized during Muharram ceremonies, and taught them to play the roles of Sakina, Zeynab, Ali Akbar and others. He knew classical Eastern music and also wrote poems. Because he was under the influence of religious figures, he did not speak in public meetings.

Kharrat Gulu's music school, which operated in the middle of the 19th century, mainly served religion, but it also led to the training of a number of musicians who played an important role in the development of Azerbaijani mugham art. Haji Husu, Mashadi Isi, Deli Ismail, Shahnaz Abbas, Bulbuljan, Keshtazli Hashim, Kechachioghlu Muhammed, Jabbar Garyaghdioglu and Tarzen Sadigjan were students of this school.

Karbalayi Kharrat Gulu died in Shusha in 1883 at the age of 60 and was buried there. After his death, Kor Khalifa continued his path and opened a music school in Shusha. After the death of Kor Khalifa, the school stopped its activities. Then Molla Ibrahim continued this music teaching in Shusha.
