= Gasim Abdullayev =

Gasim Abdullayev Qasım Abdullayev
- Also known as: Zabul Gasim
- Born: Qasım İbrahim oğlu Abdullayev; 1873; Shusha, Elisabethpol Governorate, Russian Empire
- Origin: Azerbaijani
- Died: 1927 (aged 53–54) Shusha, Nagorno-Karabakh Autonomous Oblast, Azerbaijani SSR, Transcaucasian Socialist Federative Soviet Republic, USSR
- Genres: mugham
- Occupation: khananda

Gasim Abdullayev or Zabul Gasim (Azerbaijani: Qasım Abdullayev (Zabul Qasım), 1873 – 1927) was an Azerbaijani khananda.

== Biography ==
Gasim Abdullayev was born in 1873 in Shusha.

In the last years of his life, he taught mugham at the Shusha Music School and served as chairman of the Republican Trade Union Council of Art Workers.

Zabul Gasim died in 1927 in Shusha.

== Creativity ==
Gasim Abdullayev was also known as "Zabul Gasim" for his well-known performance of "Zabul" mugham.

At that time, "Sigah" mugham was more popular in the assemblies of the Azerbaijani people. However, in the late 19th century, singers were more inclined toward "Zabul-segah". The main reason for this popularity was that, Sadigjan had added a "Zabul" veil to the tar.

At the beginning of the 20th century, Zabul Gasim had performed in Baku for several times. Zabul Gasim performed for the first time in front of the Baku audience at the "Oriental Concert" held on January 27, 1903, in the theater building of H.Z.Taghiyev with Jabbar Garyaghdioglu, Shakili Alasgar and Seyid Mirbabayev.

Zabul Gasim was not only a professional singer, he was also known as an opera artist. Zulfugar Hajibeyov, an Azerbaijani composer, invited him to the stage for the first time and highly appreciated his art. With the request of the composer, he played the role of Majnun's father in the opera "Leyli and Majnun", which was performed at the Shusha summer club on August 7, 1913.

In 1914, "Sport-Record" Company invited Gasim Abdullayev to Tbilisi and recorded his voice. Zabul Qasim sang "Zabul-segah", "Bayaty-Shiraz", "Humayun", "Shur", "Mahur-Hindi" and several other classifications.
