= Mashadi Isi =

Mashadi Isi Məşədi İsi
- Born: c. 1840s
- Died: 1905; Aghdam, Shusha uezd, Elizavetpol Governorate, Russian Empire
- Occupation: khananda
- Awards

Mashadi Isi (Azerbaijani: Məşədi İsi, c. 1840s — 1905) was a 19th-century Azerbaijani singer, representative of the Karabakh mugham school.

== Biography ==
Mashadi Isi received his first musical education in Shusha, at Kharrat Gulu's school. The singer was one of the active members of "Khanandalar majlisi" of Haji Husu.

Mashadi Isi became a connoisseur of classical Eastern, especially Azerbaijani mughams, and taught his knowledge and artistic skills to the young singers of the "Khanandalar majlisi". He performed "Rast", "Shur", "Humayun", especially "Mahur" dastgah with a unique individuality. Along with ghazals and poems of Azerbaijani poets, he also sang the works of Hafez and Saadi Shirazi. According to musicologist Jalil Baghdadbeyov, Mashadi Isi was the first to sing the poems of Azerbaijani poets in gatherings.

Mashadi Isi has performed many times in different assemblies not only in Karabakh, but also in many cities of Azerbaijan - Ganja, Agdash, Shamakhi and Baku. He sang for months at the gatherings of Mahmud Agha from Shamakhi. He was invited to Tehran several times by the Iranian king Naser al-Din Shah Qajar, won a competition with Iranian singers in the Shah's palace, and was awarded the "Order of the Lion and the Sun" by the Shah of Iran.

In the 1890s, Mashadi Isi took part in folk festivals in Ashgabat, Samarkand, Tashkent and other cities of Central Asia together with tarzen Sadigjan. In addition to being a mugham performer and connoisseur, he is also known as a classifier. Many of his classifications, especially "Rast" and "Mahur" classifications, have gained popularity. He mainly wrote classifications for many mukhammas and couplets of Molla Panah Vagif and Gasim bey Zakir.

Mashadi Isi died in 1905 in the city of Aghdam.
