= Kechachioghlu Muhammed =

Musical artist (1864–1940)

Kechachioghlu Muhammed Keçəçioğlu Məhəmməd
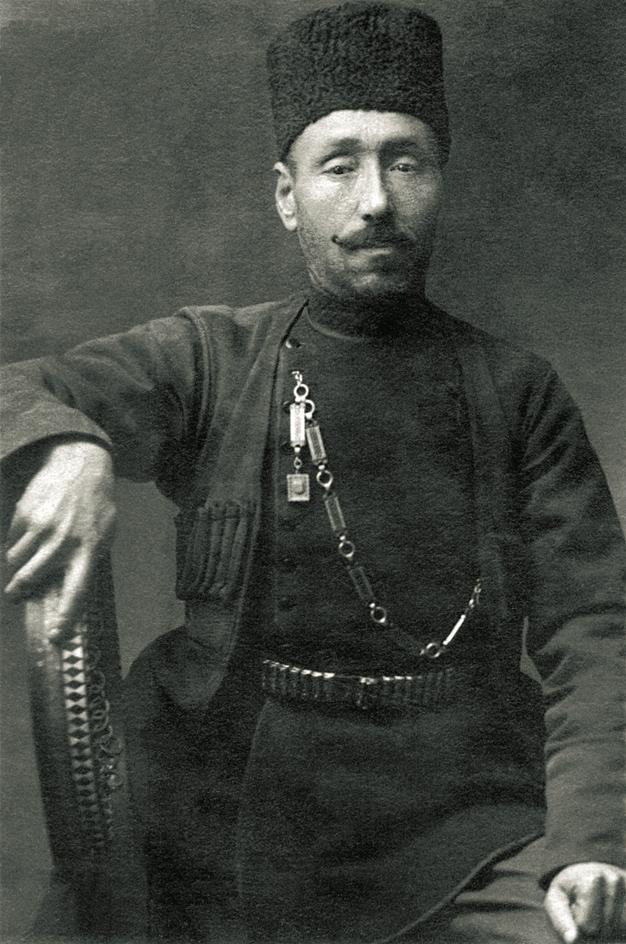
- Kechachioghlu Muhammed. Warsaw, in 1912

Background information
- Born: Məhəmməd Məşədi Xəlil oğlu June 18, 1864; Shusha, Baku Governorate, Russian Empire
- Died: November 20, 1940 (aged 76) Quba, Azerbaijan SSR, USSR
- Genre: mugham
- Occupation: khananda
- Instrument: dayereh

Kechachioghlu Muhammed (Azerbaijani: Keçəçioğlu Məhəmməd, 18 June 1864 — 20 November 1940) was an Azerbaijani khananda.

== Biography ==
Kechachioghlu was born in 1864 in Shusha. He played a special role in the development of the musical culture of Azerbaijan. He learned the art of singing in the school of Kharrat Gulu in Shusha and from the famous singer Mashadi Isi. Creative trips were widely used in his work. In addition to singing, he was engaged in pedagogical activities. In 1926 he was invited by Uzeyir Hajibeyov to the Azerbaijan State Philharmonic Hall and trained young singers.

The khananda died on 20 November 1940, in Quba.

== Creativity ==
His repertoire featured classical mugams, tasnif and folk songs. His and Jabbar Garyaghdioglu's reading of Fuzuli's scenes from the poem "Leyli and Majnun" in the form of a duet was especially famous. A number of mugham, tasnif and folk songs performed by him were recorded on the gramophone record by the "Sport-Record" (Warsaw, 1912) and "Ekstrafon" (Kiev, 1914).
