= Sakina Ismayilova =

Sakina Ismayilova Səkinə İsmayılova
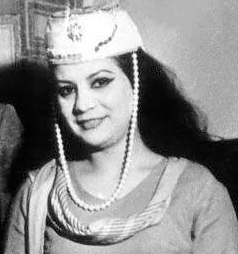
- Sakina Ismayilova

Background information
- Born: February 24, 1956 (age 70)
- Occupations: singer, mugham performer
- Instrument: dayereh
- Years active: 1974–present
- Education: Azerbaijan State University of Culture and Arts
- Awards

Sakina Gulu gizi Ismayilova (Azerbaijani: Səkinə Qulu qızı İsmayılova, born February 24, 1956) is a singer, mugham performer, and People's Artiste of Azerbaijan (1992).

== Biography ==
Sakina Ismayilova was born on February 24, 1956. She graduated from the mugham class of Asaf Zeynally Music School in 1979 and Azerbaijan State University of Culture and Arts in 1990. Ismayilova is the first female khananda to perform mugham with the dayereh. She created a mugham triads consisting of women for the first time and has performed with this ensemble in several foreign countries.

Sakina Ismayilova is a teacher at Azerbaijan State University of Culture and Arts and National Conservatory of Azerbaijan.

== Awards ==
- Honored Artist of the Azerbaijan SSR
- People's Artiste of Azerbaijan — November 18, 1992
- Shohrat Order — February 24, 2016
