= Gurban Pirimov =

Gurban Pirimov Qurban Pirimov
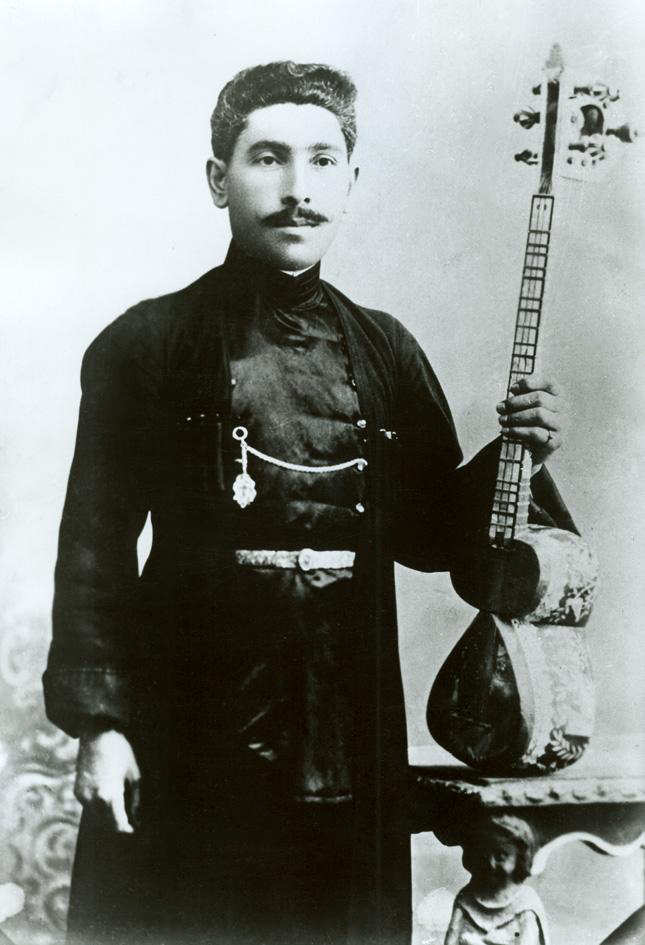
- Gurban Pirimov in 1912

Background information
- Born: Gurban Bakhshali oglu Primov; October 1880; Gülablı, Shusha uezd, Elizavetpol Governorate, Caucasus Viceroyalty, Russian Empire
- Origin: Shusha, Karabakh, Azerbaijan
- Died: 29 August 1965 (aged 84) Baku, Azerbaijan SSR, Soviet Union
- Genres: Azerbaijan folk music, mugham
- Instruments: Primary: Tar

Gurban Bakhshali oglu Pirimov (Primov) (Azerbaijani: Qurban Baxşəli oğlu Pirimov; October 1880, Gülablı – 29 August 1965, Baku) was an Azerbaijani folk musician and tar-player.

== Life and career ==
Gurban Bakhshali oglu Pirimov was born in Karabakh, in mountainous village of Gülablı near Shusha, Azerbaijan then in the Russian Empire. The Primov family had had long lasting musical traditions: Gurban's great-grandfather Valeh was a famous Karabakhi ashik; and his older brother Aghalar was a saz-player. Deeply in love with folk music, Gurban Primov dropped out of school at age 13 to move to Shusha, then one of the important cultural centres of the Caucasus.

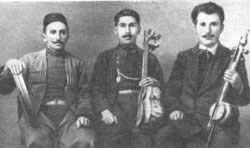
The legendary trio: Jabbar Garyagdioglu (left), Gurban Primov (centre) and Sasha Ohanezashvili

He was introduced to the celebrated musician of the time and the designer of the Azerbaijani tar, Sadigjan, whose apprentice he later became. By 1895 Pirimov was already widely known in Karabakh as a talented musician who worked with some of the most renowned khanandas of the time. In 1905 he met Jabbar Garyagdioglu and Sasha Ohanezashvili on a wedding in Ganja, and for the next 20 years they were performing as a trio. The ensembled successfully toured the Caucasus, Central Asia, and some of the Middle Eastern cities. He accompanied Garyagdioglu on the tar during the recording of mughamats on vinyl in Riga and Warsaw in 1912, and also performed some pieces solo. Together they appeared in the 1916 Azeri film Neft va milyonlar saltanatinda ("In the Realm of Oil and Millions"). Pirimov's outstanding skills were mentioned by singer Seyid Shushinski who personally witnessed Pirimov's indefatigable playing during Garyagdioglu's five-hour performance of one mughamat.

Later in life Pirimov was also a music consultant to prominent composers such as Muslim Magomayev, Reinhold Glière, Fikrat Amirov, and Gara Garayev. In 1931, Primov was awarded the honorary title of People's Artiste of Azerbaijan.

Gurban Primov married to Nabat khanum Aghalar gizi and issued four children: Asgar, Sara, Tamara, Adela.

He continued to perform until his death at age 84. His last concert took place at the Azerbaijan State Philharmonic Hall on 10 August 1965, followed by his death 19 days later. Pimirov died on 29 August and was buried at the Alley of Honor in Baku.

== See also ==
- List of People's Artistes of the Azerbaijan SSR
