= Mirza Ali Asgar Karabaghi =

Mirza Ali Asgar Karabaghi Mirzə Əli Əsgər Qarabaği
- Born: c. 1824; Shusha, Russian Empire
- Died: unknown
- Occupations: khananda, musicologist
- Instruments: kamancheh, tar
- Children: Mirza Mukhtar

Mammad oghlu Agha Mirza Ali Asgar Karabaghi (Azerbaijani: Məmməd oğlu Ağa Mirzə Əli Əsgər Qarabaği, c. 1824 — unknown) was a 19th century Azerbaijani singer, tarzen and mugham connoisseur. As a leading musician of his time, he played an important role in the development of mugham art.

== Biography ==
Mirza Ali Asgar Karabaghi was born in Shusha in 1824. He worked as both a khananda and a master kamancha player. After Ali Shirazi brought Iranian tar to Karabakh, he mastered this art and became known as a tarzen throughout the Caucasus.

Mirza Ali Asgar was previously honored as a court musician in the palace of Khurshidbanu Natavan's father, Mehdigulu Khan, and for many years he accompanied singers such as Mirza Huseyn, Hasanche, Keshtazli Hashim, Haji Husu, and Mashadi Isi in the tar. Mirza Ali Asgar also traveled to Near Eastern countries and performed as a tarzan in the gatherings organized in the palace of Iranian ruler Naser al-Din Shah Qajar.

19th century Azerbaijani tarzens such as Sadigjan, Javad Bey, Alibey oghlu (Khanazayski), Shakar oghlu Karim, Artemi and Mashadi Zeynal were students of Mirza Ali Asgar.

Mirza Ali Asgar deeply studied the music of Azerbaijan, revealed its unique features and interpreted its essence and taught it to musicians.

The date of death of Mirza Ali Asker Karabakhi is unknown. He died in Shusha.
