= House of Sadigjan =

Historic building in Shusha, Azerbaijan

House of Sadigjan Sadıqcanın evi
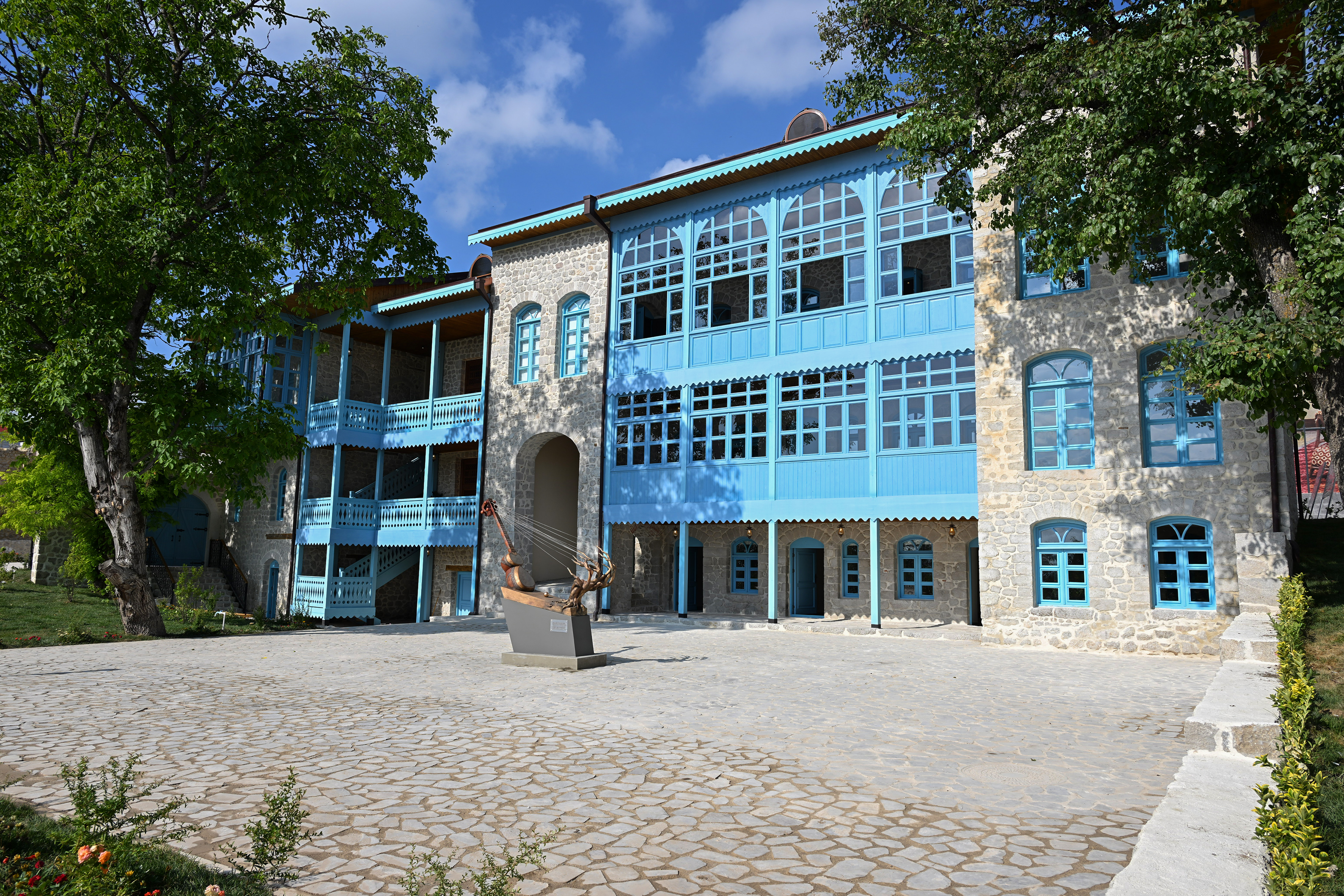
- Interactive map of the House of Sadigjan; Sadıqcanın evi area

General information
- Location: Sadigjan 40, Shusha, AZ5800, Shusha, Azerbaijan
- Coordinates: 39°45′44″N 46°45′09″E
- Completed: XIX century
- Owner: Sadigjan

Technical details
- Floor count: 3

House of Sadigjan (Azerbaijani: Sadıqcanın evi) is a residential building built in the 19th century in Shusha, Merdinli neighborhood. The house where Mirza Asad oghlu Sadig, an Azerbaijani musician, tarzan, composer and developer of the Azerbaijani tar, lived. The building is registered in the name of Sadigov Rahim, the grandson of tarzen Sadigjan.

It is included in Azerbaijan's list of historical and architectural monuments of national significance.

== History ==
The house of Mirza Asad oghlu Sadig is located in the Merdinli neighborhood of Shusha, at Sadigjan 40, which currently bears his name. The building is an architectural monument of the 19th century.

Sadigjan's house was destroyed after the city of Shusha came under Armenian control. After the liberation of the city, the ruins of the building were discovered.

In accordance with an Order signed by President Ilham Aliyev in 2022, funds were allocated for the design and restoration of the house. On July 11 of 2026, Ilham Aliyev attended the opening ceremony of the restored Sadigjan House in Shusha.
