= Sazanda =

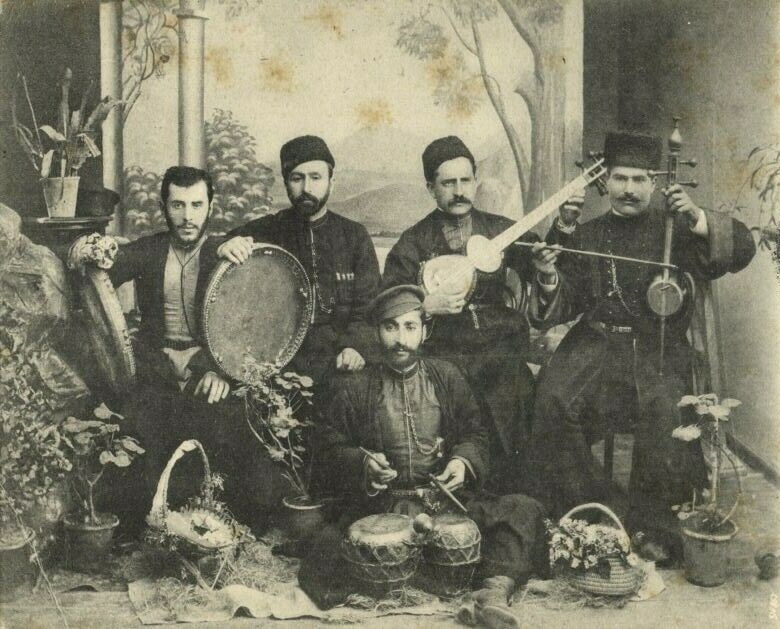
A sazandar orchestra, 1906

A sazanda or sazandar (Azerbaijani: sazəndə / سازنده; Armenian: սազանդար; Persian: سازنده; Georgian: საზანდარი; alternative spellings in English: sazende, sazandeh) is one of the three musicians in the traditional ensemble of instrumentalists performing along with a singer (khananda, in the case of an Azeri mugham performance) in the South Caucasus. The word means "builder" in Persian. The trio consists of a tarist, a kamanchist and a daf player. Historically the word sazanda(r) was applied to any instrumentalist from Anatolia, the Caucasus or Iran, who played a folk instrument.

== History and development ==
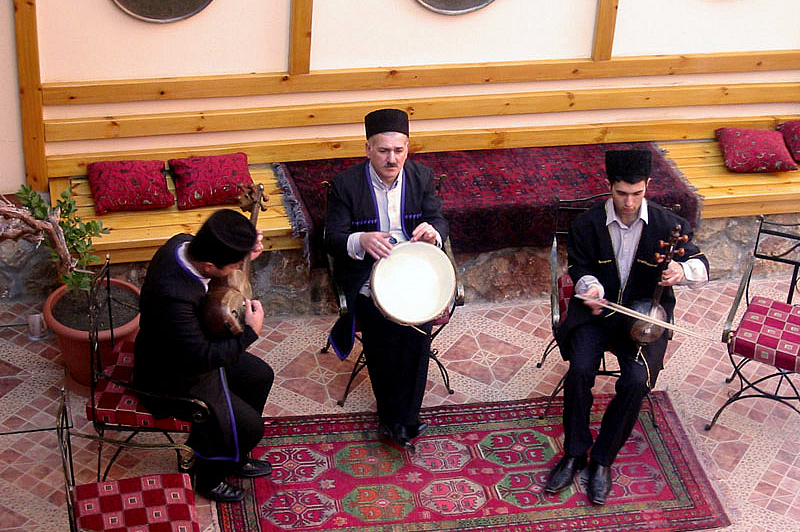
Trio of sazandas

The tradition of a musical trio of sazandas playing the aforementioned instruments did not originate until the beginning of the 20th century. According to Jabbar Garyagdioglu, the mugham ensembles of the early 19th century consisted of three musicians playing the tar, the kamancheh and the balaban. In the late 19th-century, the latter was replaced by gosha-naghara. Nowadays the traditional variety of tambourine called daf is used and is often played by the singers themselves.

Similar to the ensembles, the instruments have gone through changes in structure as well. Kamancheh has gone from having 2 strings to having 3, 4 or even 5. Prominent Azeri sazanda Sadigjan developed a new version of tar (nowadays known as the Azeri tar or the Caucasus tar) by adding one more string to this once 6-string instrument and improving it with a number of new features. After Sadigjan, the tar has been played nestled to the chest rather than held vertically during mugham performances.

The prominence of sazandas was seen by the physical appearance of their instruments. Some would decorate them with precious metals and gems. Sadigjan himself was reported of having decorated his tar with gold and nacre.

== See also ==
- Khananda
- Ashik
- Bozlak
