= Jalil Baghdadbeyov =

Jalil Baghdadbeyov Cəlil Bağdadbəyov
- Born: Jalil bey Amrah bey oghlu Baghdadbeyov; 1887; Shusha, Elisabethpol Governorate, Russian Empire
- Died: April 21, 1951 (aged 63–64); Baku, Azerbaijan SSR, USSR
- Citizenship: Russian Empire→ Azerbaijan (ADR)→ Azerbaijan SSR
- Occupation(s): Theater actor, theatre director, translator
- Years active: 1907–1948

Jalil bey Amrah bey oghlu Baghdadbeyov (Azerbaijani: Cəlil bəy Əmrah bəy oğlu Bağdadbəyov; 1887 – April 21, 1951) was one of the first art critics and ethnographers of Azerbaijan, theater actor, director and organizer, translator, Honored Artist of the Azerbaijan SSR (1943).

== Biography ==
Jalil Baghdadbeyov was born in Shusha in 1887. He received his first education at the progressive school here, and then studied at the St. Petersburg gymnasium. After returning to Baku in 1904, he performed office work in various oil fields. He later studied at the Azerbaijan State Theater Technical College, and after graduating from this school, he continued his theater studies in Moscow. Jalil Baghdadbeyov received a professional theater education, was a student of Yevgeny Vakhtangov in Moscow, and learned theater knowledge from Konstantin Stanislavski. In addition, he studied Arabic, Persian, French, Russian, as well as the languages of the peoples of Central Asia.

To organize and develop theater art, he was sent to Central Asia from the second half of the 1920s to the mid-1930s by the decision of the Council of People's Commissars of Azerbaijan SSR. After returning to Baku, he started working as a teacher at the Azerbaijan State Theater Technical College.

Jalil Baghdadbeyov was part of the Red Army in Iran together with cultural figures during the Great Patriotic War. In the years after the war, he continued his activities as a production director in various theaters, worked as the director of the Baku Concert Union, Jafar Jabbarli Theater, and lectured on "Art history of peoples in different periods" at the Theater Institute.

Jalil Baghdadbeyov died on April 21, 1951, at the age of 64, in Baku.

He was the uncle of the People's Writer of Azerbaijan SSR Ilyas Afandiyev.

== Career ==
In 1907, Jalil Baghdadbeyov was hired as an actor in the theater troupe of the "Nijat" society, he acted here and in the "Safa" theater troupes, in the "Muslim Opera Artists" troupe led by Huseyngulu Sarabski, and in the "Management of Zulfugar Bey and Uzeyir Bey Hajibeyli Brothers".

J. Baghdadbeyov started his directing career in 1920 at Bibiheybat and Balakhani theater clubs. At the same time, he worked as a director in theaters operating in Agdash, Lankaran, Nukha and Shusha. In 1920, the actor joined the troupe of the National Drama Theater and from September 1922 to the end of 1924, he also worked at the Baku Turkish Free Criticism and Propaganda Theater.

In 1929, he led the drama courses at the music technical school in Ashgabat, created the Turkmen drama troupe, and wrote the play "Aulda radio" for the Ashgabat theater. He wrote the propaganda dramas "Tajik girl" and "Komsomol va nishan" in Tajik language.

In 1938–1948, he performed creative activities in the drama associations and state theaters of the cities of Shamakhi, Shusha, Salyan, Agdash, Zagatala, Garyagin, Aghdam, Shamkhor, Nakhchivan, Ordubad. He performed there both as an actor and a director, prepared plays and played roles.

Jalil Baghdadbeyov was the author of a number of plays. His plays "Emir of Bukhara", "Shining Stars" and other plays were staged in theaters in Dushanbe, Samarkand, Tashkent, Kokand, Ashgabat and other cities. Although Jalil Bey, who worked on the play "Khanlar", planned to make a film based on this play, it did not happen due to the beginning of the Great Patriotic War.

Jalil Baghdadbeyov also worked as an ethnographer. His writings such as "Engagement", "Paltarbichma", "Wedding", "Duvaggapma", "Village Weddings" talk about the traditions of the Azerbaijani people. J. Baghdadbeyov is also the first person to write the history of Azerbaijani mughams. He is the author of the first written information about Haji Husu, Mashadi Isi, Deli Ismayil Bey, Mir Mohsun Navvab, Bagban Akbar, Majid Behbudov and others.

== Awards ==
- Honored Artist of the Azerbaijan SSR — June 17, 1943
