= Tar (Azerbaijani instrument) =

Traditional long-necked string instrument

Azerbaijani tar
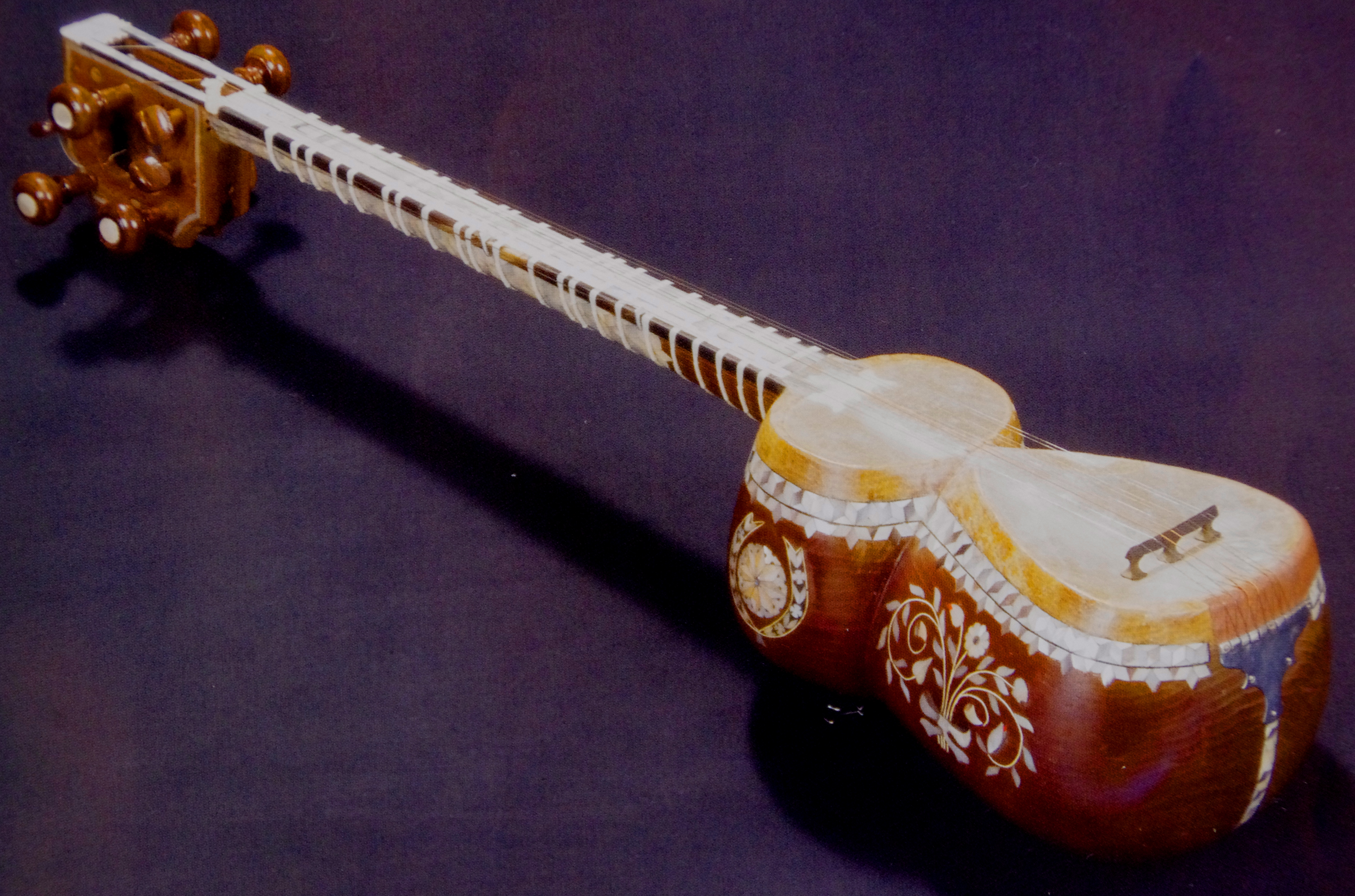
- Azerbaijani Tar

String instrument
- Classification: Tar

Craftsmanship and performance art of the Tar, a long-necked string musical instrument
- UNESCO Intangible Cultural Heritage
- Country: Azerbaijan
- Reference: 00671
- Region: Europe and North America

Inscription history
- Inscription: 2012 (7th session)
- List: Representative

The Azerbaijani Tar is a long-necked, plucked lute, traditionally crafted, and performed in communities throughout the Republic of Azerbaijan. The tar is featured alone or with other instruments in numerous traditional musical styles. It is also considered by many to be the country's leading musical instrument. The tar and the skills related to this tradition play a significant role in shaping the cultural identity of Azerbaijanis. It was developed from the Persian tar.

In 2012, the craftsmanship and performance art of the tar was added to the UNESCO's Intangible Cultural Heritage List.

== Performing ==
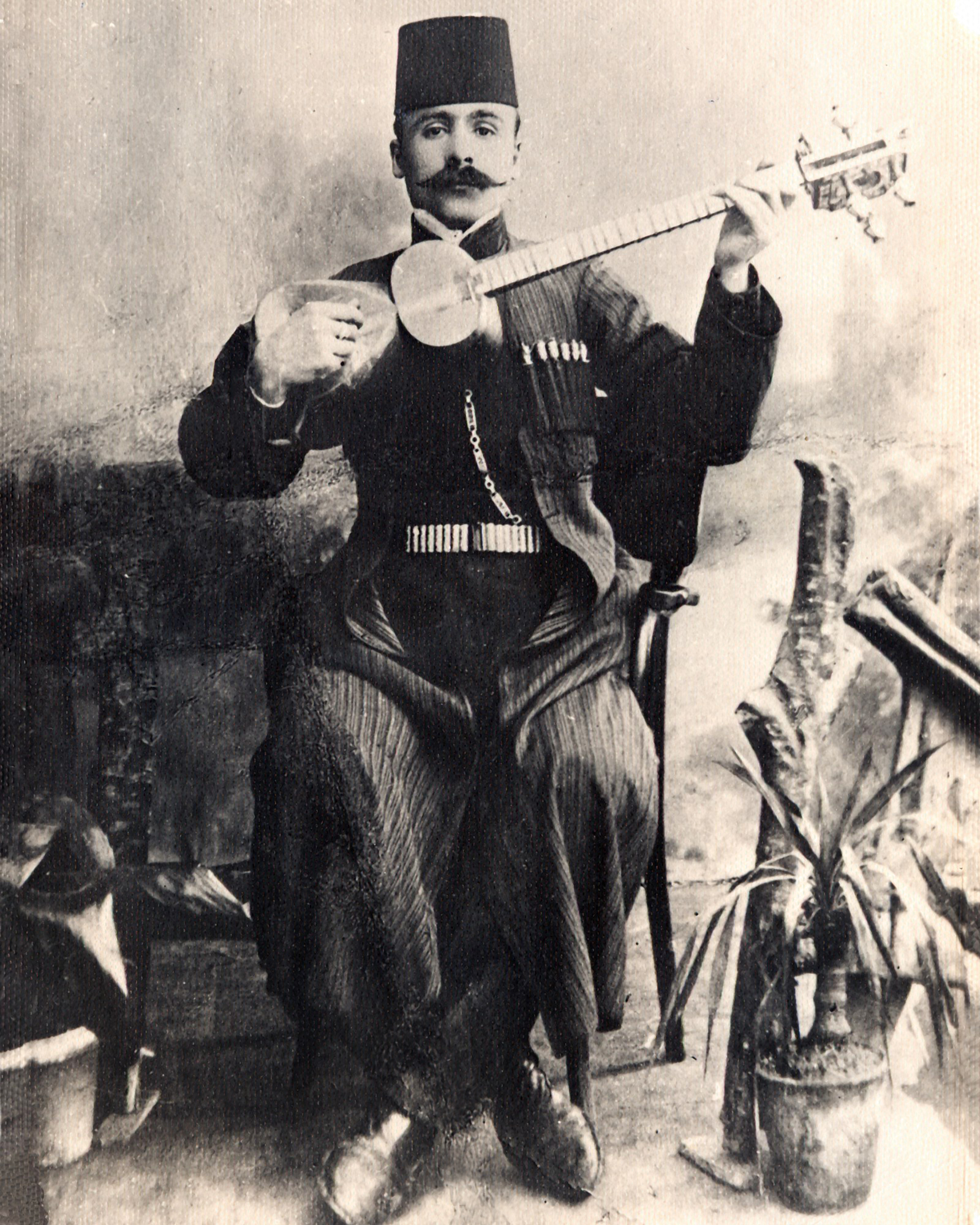
Azerbaijani tar performer Mashadi Jamil Amirov

Performers hold the instrument horizontally, against the chest, and pluck the strings with a plectrum, while using trills and a variety of techniques and strokes to add colour. Tar performance has an essential place in weddings and different social gatherings, festive events, and public concerts. Players transmit their skills to young people within their community by word of mouth, demonstration, and at educational musical institutions.

== History ==
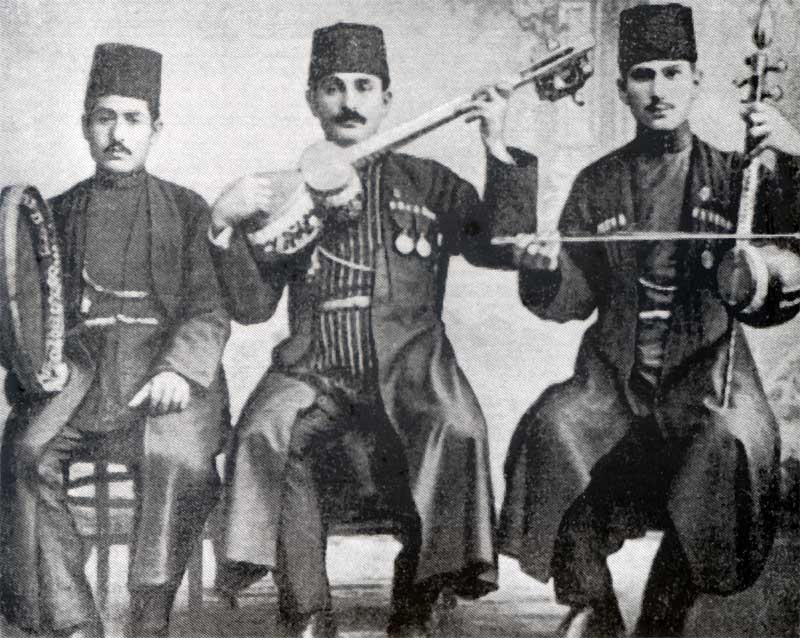
Trio of mugham performers (tar performer sits in the center). Baku, 1912

The "Azerbaijani tar" or "11 string tar" is an instrument in a slightly different shape from the Persian Tar and was developed from the original Persian tar around 1870 by Sadigjan. It has a slightly different build and has more strings. The Caucasus tar has one extra bass-string on the side, on a raised nut, and usually 2 double resonance strings via small metal nuts halfway the neck. All these strings are running next to the main strings over the bridge and are fixed to a string-holder and the edge of the body.

In the second half of the 19th century, tar went through different renovations. One of the greatest musicians - performers on container Mirza Sadiq Asad (1846-1902) introduced changes in traditional iranian tar structure and form, increasing the number of its strings and bringing them up to 11. He, in addition, has changed the way the game on the container, raising tool with performer knees to his chest.

New flowering of playing on the container begins in the 20th century. For example, the tar took the lead in the first Sheet orchestra of folk musical instruments, created in 1931 on the initiative of Uzeyir Hajibeyov and Muslim Magomayev largest Azerbaijani composers and public figures of the first half of the 20th century. School of sheet music playing on national instruments based Uzeyir Hajibeyov, further expanded the technical and artistic possibilities of the packaging.

In Azerbaijan music, tar was used primarily as a lead instrument in the so-called mugham trio of singers (singer), which also includes kamancha and daf. The tar, as a part of mugham trio and as a solo, to date, continues to play a crucial role in the art of mugam, traditional and popular in Azerbaijan.

== See also ==
- Music of Azerbaijan
- Mugham
