= Haji Husu =

Haji Husu Hacı Hüsü
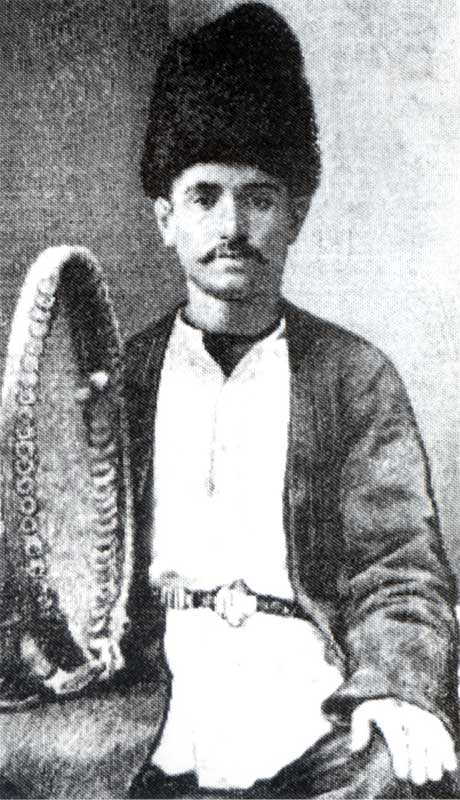

Background information
- Born: Kazımlı Hacı Hüsü Niftalı oğlu c. 1830; Shusha, Russian Empire
- Died: 1898 (aged 67–68) Ashgabat, Transcaspian Oblast, Russian Turkestan, Russian Empire
- Genres: mugham
- Occupation: khananda

Haji Husu (Azerbaijani: Hacı Hüsü, around 1830 – 1898) was a mugham singer.

== Biography ==
He was born Husu Niftali oglu Kazimli (Azerbaijani: Niftalı oğlu Kazımlı) around 1830 in Shusha. Haji Husu received his first education from private classes with a mullah. Then he continued his studies at a madrasa. A gifted singer, he studied traditional singing with Kharrat Gulu, one of the most prominent representatives of Shusha vocal art. Haji Husu's first public performance was that of the "Chahargah" in a charity event at the Khandamirov Theatre, following the performance of Sadigjan. He became a popular invited singer not only at weddings in the Caucasus, but also in several cities across the Middle East. In 1880, Iranian Naser al-Din Shah Qajar, the ruler of Iran, invited Haji Husu to Tabriz for his son's wedding. Haji Husu, who performed with famous Iranian singers at the wedding, was eventually awarded by the shah.

In the 1880s, Haji Husu and Mir Mohsun Navvab founded a musicians' association in Shusha, where the art of mugham was discussed during regular meetings. Mashadi Jamil Amirov, Islam Abdullayev, Seyid Shushinski, Sadigjan were frequent participants of the meetings. In 1883, they organized a circle for the training of young singers.

In addition to being a singer, Haji Husu also engaged in pedagogical activity and was known as a musician who excelled in Oriental and Azerbaijani mugham. He improved a number of mughams and created new versions of them. For instance, he fused "Shahnaz" with "Kurdi" yielding "Kurdi-Shahnaz". According to Jabbar Garyaghdioglu, Haji Husu is also the creator of the "Gatar" mugham accompanied by Sadigjan.

The last years of Haji Husu's life were not so successful. After returning from Arabia, he was forced to recite the call to prayer at Govhar Agha Mosque in Shusha under pressure from mullahs.

Haji Husu died in 1898 in Ashgabat.
