= Bulbuljan =

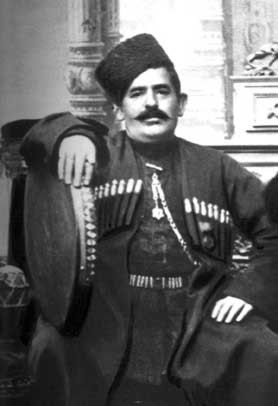

Background information
- Born: Abdulbagi Ali oglu Zulalov; 1841; Shusha, Russian Empire
- Died: 1927 (aged 85–86) Baku, Russian Empire
- Genres: Mugham, Azerbaijani folk music
- Occupations: singer, song-writer
- Instrument: Voice
- Years active: 1875–1927

Bulbuljan (Azerbaijani: Bülbülcan), born as Abdulbagi Ali oglu Zulalov (1841–1927), was an Azerbaijani singer of folk music and mugam (an original improvisational genre of classical folk music in Azerbaijan). He was also famous for his performance of Azeri mugams in other regional languages, such as Georgian, Lezgian, Kumyk, Persian, and Russian.

== Life and career ==
Abdulbagi Zulalov, later known as Bulbuljan, was born in 1841 in Shusha (then part of the Russian Empire, nowadays in Azerbaijan). In his younger years he travelled a lot throughout the Caucasus and Iran. During one of his visits in Iran Mozzafar al-Din Shah Qajar (the ruler of Iran) liked his performance so much that he awarded Zulalov the Shir-o Khorshid order, the highest Iranian order at the time.

In 1875 Zulalov moved to Tbilisi, the regional cultural capital at the time, where he would live until 1905. He gave concerts together with his fellow-countryman, a great tar player Sadigjan. Due to his wonderful voice, attractive appearance and high artistic performance, he quickly became famous throughout the Caucasus. Having learned Georgian language and began to perform Azeri mugams in Georgian would bring the Georgian listeners into rapture. This was the time when he began to be called Bulbuljan, which literally means "[our] dear nightingale" in the Azeri language.

In 1888, Bulbuljan took part in a meeting in honor of Alexander III's visit to the Caucasus. Delighted by Bulbuljan's singing, Alexander III allowed him to cross the current Rustaveli Avenue on horseback. And in 1904, Prince Mikhail Romanov, the brother of Nicholas I, attended a feast in the Garden of Eden in Tiflis, where Bulbuljan sang and was awarded a gift from the prince.

After returning to Shusha in 1905, he dedicated himself to raising his orphaned nephews. In the early 1920s he moved to Baku to teach at the newly opened post-secondary musical institutions, and remained there until his death.

Bulbuljan significantly influenced many prominent Azerbaijani mugam and folk singers. Masters of mugham such as Jabbar Garyaghdyoglu, Musa Shushinski, Mashadi Mammad Farzaliyev, Shakili Alasgar, Seyid Shushinski and many others considered him their artistic master. Today the Zulalov family is known in Azerbaijan as a family of musical talents. Bulbuljan's daughter, granddaughter and nephews continued his traditions of mugam arts.
