= Music of Azerbaijan =

Azerbaijani music (Azerbaijani: Azərbaycan musiqisi) is the musical tradition of the Azerbaijani people from the Azerbaijan Republic. Azerbaijani music has evolved under the badge of monody, producing rhythmically diverse melodies. Music from Azerbaijan has a branch mode system, where chromatisation of major and minor scales is of great importance.

== Classical music ==
In 1920, Azerbaijani classical music had undergone a renaissance and the Baku Academy of Music was founded to give classical musicians the same support as folk musicians. Modern-day advocates of Western classical music in Azerbaijani include Farhad Badalbeyli, Fidan Gasimova and Franghiz Alizadeh.

=== Opera and Ballet ===
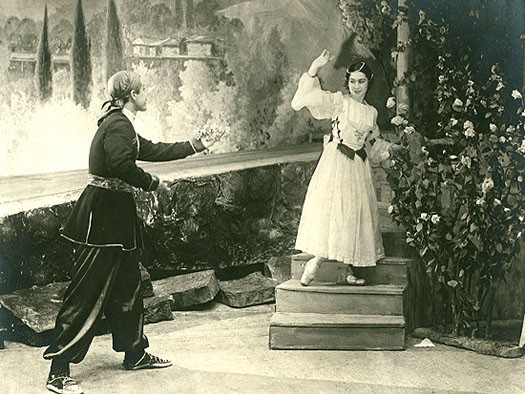
Scene from Ballet of "The Maiden Tower" by Afrasiyab Badalbeyli

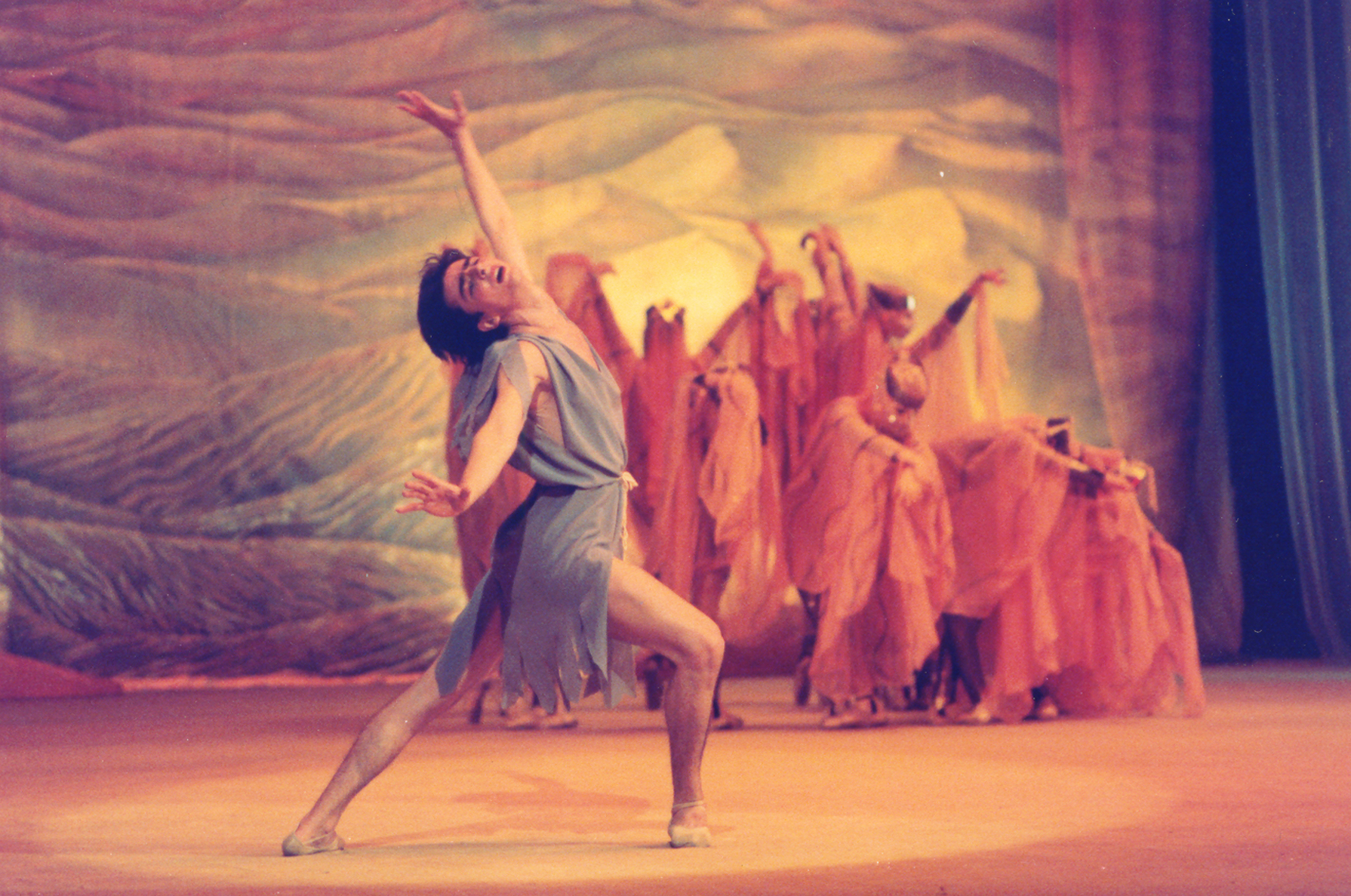
Scene from Ballet of "Leyli and Majnun" by Gara Garayev

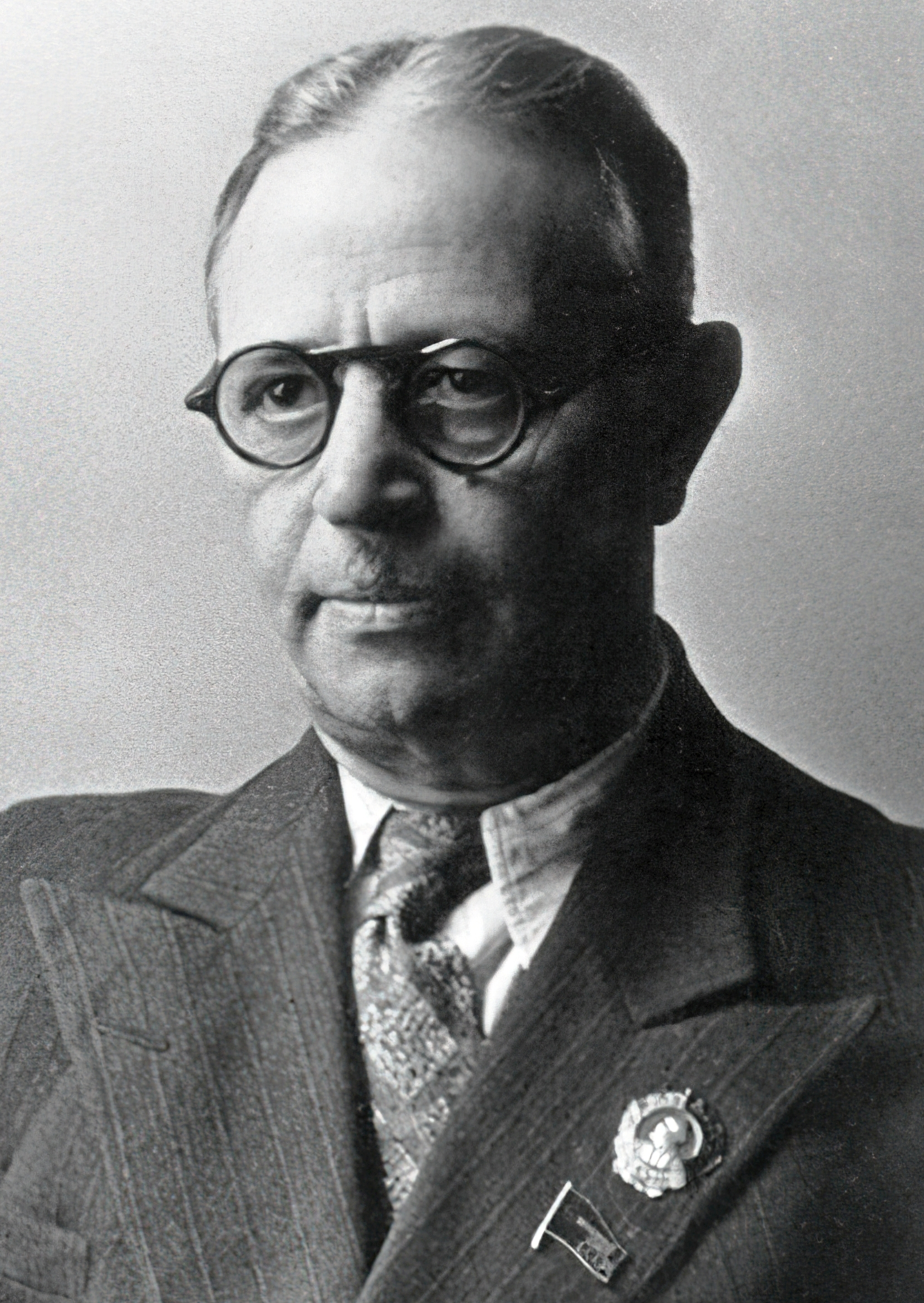
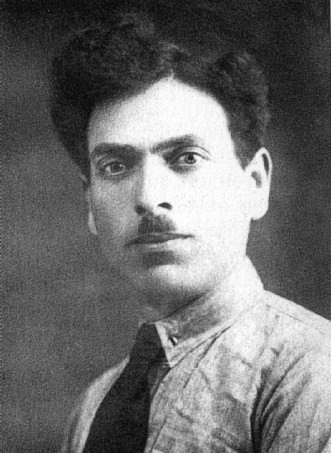
Creators of the national anthem of Azerbaijan Uzeyir Hajibeyov (left) and Ahmad Javad (right)

The emergence of opera and ballet in Azerbaijan is associated with the Imperial Russian and Soviet eras of Azerbaijani history, when Azerbaijani musicians became exposed to European music traditions first-hand. The very first documented performance of an opera in Baku took place in May 1889 when Alexey Verstovsky's opera Askold's grave was staged at a circus arena in Baku (on the site of the current Azerbaijan Carpet Museum building), accompanied by the folk choir of Dmitry Agrenev-Slavyanski. Beginning in 1900, opera troupes toured Baku on a yearly basis (except 1901 and 1913), featuring prominent singers of the time such as Natalia Ermolenko-Yuzhina and Antonina Nezhdanova.

Prominent Azerbaijani opera singers such as Bulbul, Shovkat Mammadova, Fatma Mukhtarova, Huseyngulu Sarabski, Hagigat Rzayeva, Rashid Behbudov, Rauf Atakishiyev, Muslim Magomayev, Lutfiyar Imanov, Fidan and Khuraman Gasimovas, Rubaba Muradova, Zeynab Khanlarova and many other singers gained world fame.

== Folk music ==
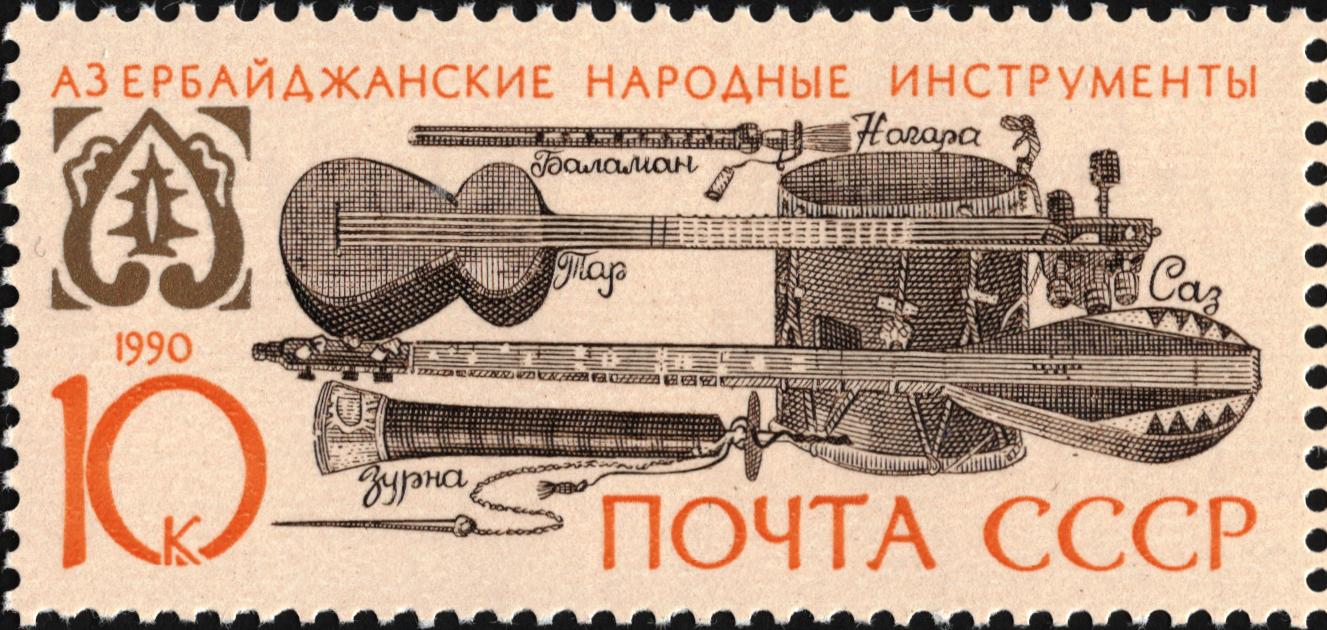
Azerbaijani instruments: balaban, nagara, tar, saz, zurna.

Most songs recount stories of real-life events and Azerbaijani folklore, or have developed through song contests between troubadour poets. Corresponding to their origins, folk songs are usually played at weddings, funerals, and special festivals.

=== Folk instruments ===
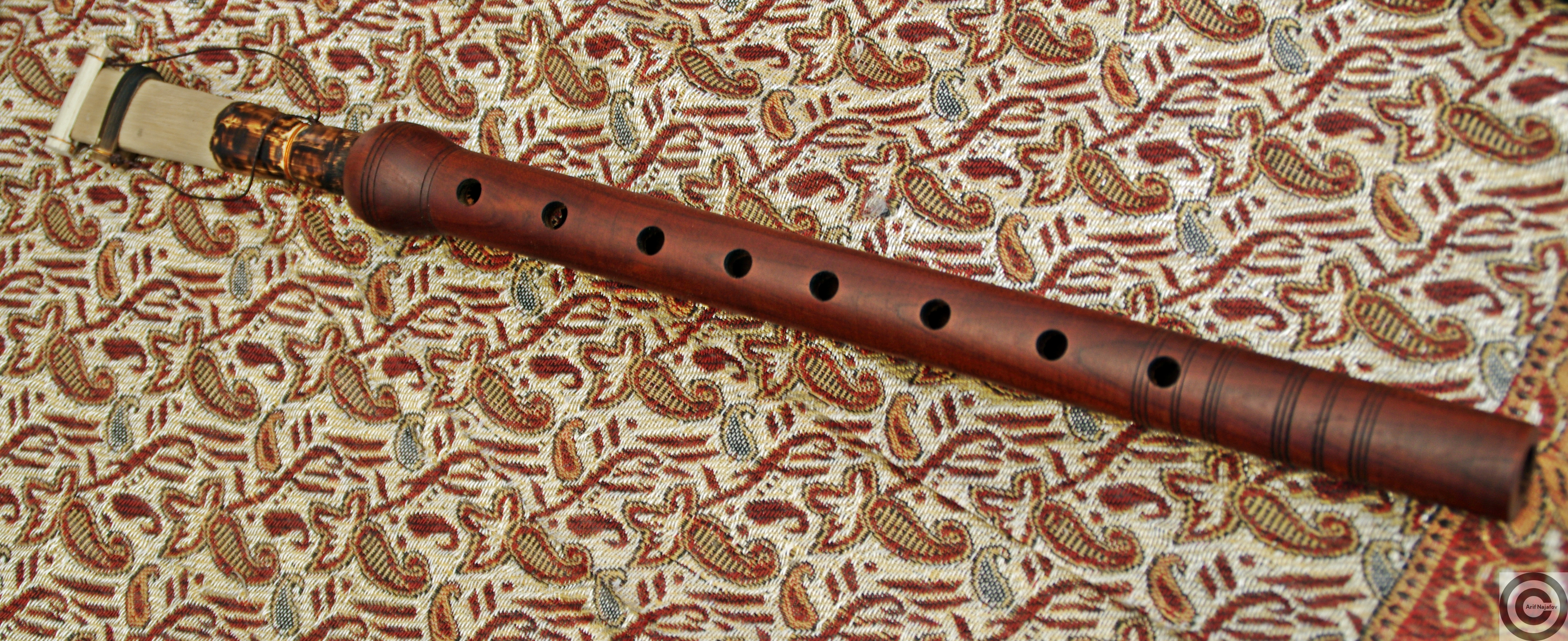
The Balaban is considered Azerbaijan's national instrument.

Instruments used in Azerbaijani music include the stringed instruments tar (skin faced lute), the kamancha (skin faced spike fiddle), the oud, originally barbat, and the saz (long-necked lute); the double-reed wind instrument balaban, the frame drum ghaval, the cylindrical double faced drum nagara (davul), and the gosha nagara (pair of small kettle drums). Other instruments include the garmon (small accordion), tutek (whistle flute), and daf (frame drum).

Due to the cultural exchange prevalent during the rule of the Ottoman Empire, the tutek has influenced various cultures in the Caucasus region, e.g. the duduks. The zurna and naghara duo is also popular in rural areas, and played at weddings and other local celebrations.

=== Ashiqs ===
Ashiqs are traveling bards who sing and play the saz, a form of lute. Their songs are semi-improvised around a common base. This art is one of the symbols of Azerbaijani culture and considered an emblem of national identity and the guardian of Azerbaijani language, literature and music.

Since 2009 the art of Azerbaijani Ashiqs has been inscribed on the Representative List of the Intangible Cultural Heritage of Humanity.

=== Meykhana ===
Meykhana is a distinctive Azerbaijani literary and folk rap tradition, consisting of an unaccompanied song performed by one or more people improvising on a particular subject. Meykhana is distinct from spoken word poetry in that it is performed in time to a beat.

Meykhana is often compared to hip hop music, also known as national rap among Azerbaijani residents, as it also includes performers that is spoken lyrically, in rhyme and verse, generally to an instrumental or synthesized beat. Performers also incorporate synthesizers, drum machines, and live bands. Meykhana masters may write, memorize, or improvise their lyrics and perform their works a cappella or to a beat.

=== Mugham ===
Mugham is one of the many folk musical compositions from Azerbaijan, in contrast with Tasnif, Ashugs. Mugam draws on Arabic maqam.

It is an art form that weds classical poetry and musical improvisation in specific local modes. Mugham is a modal system. Unlike Western modes, "mugham" modes are associated not only with scales but with an orally transmitted collection of melodies and melodic fragments that performers use in the course of improvisation. Mugham is a compound composition of many parts. The choice of a particular mugham and a style of performance fits a specific event. The dramatic unfolding in performance is typically associated with increasing intensity and rising pitches, and a form of poetic-musical communication between performers and initiated listeners.

Three major schools of mugham performance existed from the late 19th and early 20th centuries - the region of Garabagh, Shirvan, and Baku. The town of Shusha of Karabakh was particularly renowned for this art.

The short selection of Azerbaijani mugham played in balaban, national wind instrument was included on the Voyager Golden Record, attached to the Voyager spacecraft as representing world music, included among many cultural achievements of humanity.

In 2003, UNESCO proclaimed mugham as a Masterpiece of Oral and Intangible Cultural Heritage of Humanity.

== Popular music ==
Popular music is distinguished from the traditional genres as those styles that entered the Azerbaijani musicality after the fall of the Soviet Union, either due to attempts of national modernization from 1918 onwards, the opening of the republic to Western musical influences or modern fusions and innovations from artists themselves.

=== Mainstream pop ===
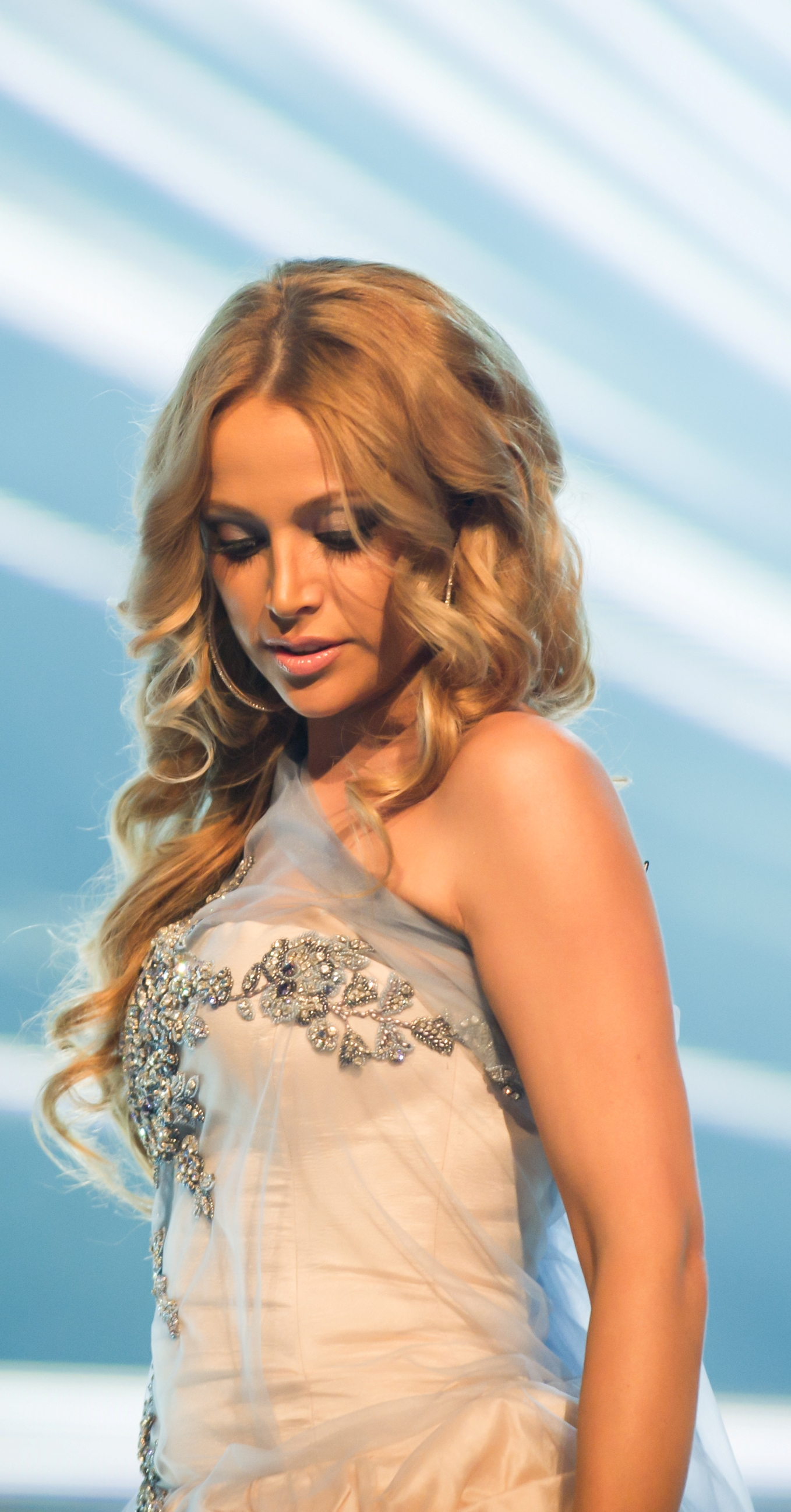
Nikki Jamal became one of the most successful pop artists of the 2010s.

Azerbaijani pop music had its humble beginnings in the late 1950s with Azerbaijani cover versions of a wide range of imported popular styles, including rock and roll, tango, and jazz. As more styles emerged, they were also adopted, such as hip hop, heavy metal, and reggae.

Azerbaijani pop music reached a new level after the country made its debut appearance at the 2008 Eurovision Song Contest. The country's entry gained the third place in 2009 and fifth the following year. Ell and Nikki won the first place at the Eurovision Song Contest 2011 with the song "Running Scared", entitling Azerbaijan to host the contest in 2012, in Baku.

The biggest pop stars in Azerbaijan are arguably Roya, Aygun Kazimova and Brilliant Dadashova.

=== Azerbaijani jazz ===
The Azerbaijani jazz is a popular variety of jazz, widespread in Azerbaijan. It covers a broad range of styles (traditional, post-bop, fusion, free flexion) and often features a blend with traditional Azerbaijani music. Among modern famed Azeri jazz musicians are Aziza Mustafazadeh, who was influenced by Bill Evans and Keith Jarrett, Isfar Sarabski, Salman Gambarov and Rain Sultanov.

=== Azerbaijani hip hop ===
The first Azerbaijani hip-hop song "Yesterday is Past", created in 1983 by Chingiz Mustafayev, who would later become Azerbaijan's national hero for unrelated reasons. The pioneer of Azerbaijani rap often associated with name of Anar Nagilbaz in 1992, which also included elements of disco but the popularity of the rap genre came with the rise of Dayirman, which included primarily patriotic elements.

=== Azerbaijani rock ===
The Azerbaijani rock scene began in the mid-to-late 1960s, when popular United States and United Kingdom bands became well known. Soon, a distinctively Azerbaijani fusion of rock and folk emerged; this was called Azerbaijani rock, a term which nowadays may be generically ascribed to most of the Azerbaijani rock. Coldünya and Yuxu are the best known group of older classical Azerbaijani rock music.

=== Electronic dance music ===
There are many clubs across Azerbaijan, especially across its Baku region. The alternative music scene, however, is derived mostly from Baku's club scene that sees DJs merging the past with the present, utilising traditional motifs with new age sounds and electronic music.

== See also ==
- List of Azerbaijani musicians
- Azerbaijani hip hop
- Azerbaijani rock
- Innaby
- Şən Azərbaycan
- Mugham triads
