= Sadigjan =

Azerbaijani folk musician and tar player (1846–1902)

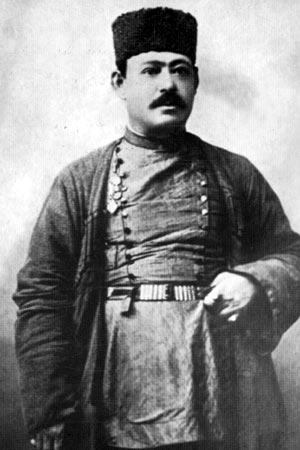

Background information
- Born: Mirza Sadig; 1846; Shusha, Russian Empire
- Origin: Shusha, Azerbaijan
- Died: 1902 (aged 55–56)
- Genres: Azerbaijani Folk Music, Mugham
- Instruments: Primary: Tar
- Members: Son: Bahadur Sadigov Grandson: Rahim Sadigov Great-grandson: Elchin Sadigov Great-great-grandson: Afer Sadigov

Mirza Sadig, more commonly known as Sadigjan (Azerbaijani: Sadıqcan; 1846 – 1902), was an Azerbaijani folk musician, tar player, and the creator of the Azerbaijani tar (also known as upgraded tar).

Sadigjan is one of the famous Azerbaijani tar players. By improving this instrument, Sadigjan expanded the possibilities of virtuoso playing on this instrument. He increased the number of strings from 5 to 13, made additional changes to the body of the instrument, and completely changed the system of frets on the tar's neck reducing their number from 27–28 to 22.

Sadigjan introduced significant innovations in the Azerbaijani mugham improving the "Segah", "Mirza Huseyn Segah" and the "Mahur" mughams. The appearance in Azerbaijani music of "Mahur-Hindi", "Orta Mahur", "Zabul Segah", "Kharij Segah", "Yetim Segah", "Choban Bayati" mughams is associated with the work of Sadigjan and the Azerbaijani tar.

In the 1890s, under the leadership of Sadigjan, an ensemble was created in Shusha. This included famous singers and musicians of that time. Among the students of tar were such famous musicians as Gurban Primov, Mashadi Zeynal, Arsen Yaramishev, Mardi Janibekov, Malibeyli Hamid, Mashadi Jamil Amirov, Shirin Akhundov and others.

== Biography ==
=== Childhood and youth ===
Sadikh Mirza Asad oghlu was born in the family of a watchman in the city of Shusha, according to most sources, in 1846 (according to other sources - in 1842) in a one- story house consisting of two rooms. Later, when the fame came to him, Mirza Sadikh built a three-story house on one of the best streets of Shusha and himself took part in its construction as a worker for several days.

From childhood, Sadikh showed a great interest in art, and wonderfully sang folk songs. His father, Asadullah, took him to the school of the famous musicologist Harrat Gulu. After checking his vocal abilities, Sadikh was accepted there. The graduates of this school, besides Sadigjan, were the most famous mugham performers of Shusha - Haji Husi, Mashadi Isi, Deli Ismail, Shahnaz Abbas, Bulbuljan, Keshtazly Hashim, Kechachioglu Mahammad, Jabbar Garyaghdioghlu. This school had a great influence on the formation of Sadikh as a musician. At the age of 18, Sadigjan lost his voice and after that he learned to play various musical instruments such as: kamancha, flute, nai, and tar. He was taught to play tar by the famous Shusha tarist Mirza Ali Asgar, who, being impressed by his play, said:

I would like Sadikh to have my wealth, and I could have his fingers.

In the ensemble of Mirza Ali Asgar, Mirza Sadikh was a kemanchist. But one day, when Mirza Ali Asgar fell ill, Sadigjan, replaced him as a tar player and managed to demonstrate his abilities in playing this instrument. Inspired by his success, Sadigjan devoted himself entirely to tar, and since then he has been constantly honing his skills.

=== Success ===
To the beginning of the 19th century, Shusha was one of the cultural centers. Poets, playwrights, famous musicians and artists from all over the Caucasus came here where theatrical performances were staged and musical meetings were held. The musical meetings were the most famous in Azerbaijan and played an important role in the recognition of Sadigjan as a tar player. [15] Among these majlises organized by Mir Mohsun Navvab "Mejlisi- Faramushan" ("Mejlis of the forgotten"), "Mejlisi-khananda" ("society of musicians") and Majlises arranged by Khurshidbanu Natavan, where singers and musicians demonstrated their art, discussions were held on the problems of the music theory, the works of poets were performed, and competitions were organized. Sadikh took part in such Majlis events, thanks to which his name became known in the neighboring countries.

The excellent performance of Sadigjan attracted the attention of Mahmud Agha from Shamakhi. He is known by the work "Karabakh-nama" by the poet and musicologist Muhammed-agha Muzhtehidzade, in which he tells that "Mahmud-agha of Shirvan, having heard about the glory of Sadigjan, asked him to visit Shirvan". At the invitation of Mahmud Agha, Sadigjan visited Shamakhi and took part in a musical meeting. Once Mahmud-agha sent Seyid Azim Shirvani to Shusha after Mirza Sadikh, he dedicated to Sadigjan one of his muhammas. Being an admirer of Mirza Sadikh's creation, Mahmud-agha often invited him to his place together with Haji Husi and even gave him a tar, the body of which was made of gold. Since that time, the musical meetings at Mahmud-agha could not take place without Sadigjan. This greatly irritated Khurshidbanu Natavan since the performance of Sadikh was an adornment at the "Majlisi-Uns" organized by her, as well as at the celebrations in the Khan's palace which did not take place without his participation. It is assumed that due to him, Natavan and Mahmud-agha corresponded for a long time.

In addition to the participation in celebrations and musical meetings, Sadikh gave concerts during the breaks of performances held in Shusha and Tiflis. On 29 December 1886, in the building of the Artsruni Theater in Tiflis, the play “Monsieur Jourdan - a botanist and dervish Mastalishah”, based on the play of Mirza Fatali Akhundov, was staged, and during the intermissions Mirza Sadikh and the famous khanende (mugham performer) Mirzali were expected to perform. The “Caucasian Review” issued in Tiflis, wrote about Sadikh in the heading “Theater and Music”:

From the memoirs of contemporaries of Mirza Sadikh follows that he spent most of his life on the road participating in the festivities that took place in the Caucasus, Iran, Central Asia and Turkey. In March 1872, on the occasion of the celebration of Novruz, he was invited by the Iranian ambassador to Russia to St. Petersburg where he performed with the famous khanende Sattar.

It is known that starting from the 18th century in the countries of the Middle East, including Azerbaijan, singers and performers who gained recognition and fame among people were given a name or pseudonym with using “jan” (“soul”). Among people, Mirza Sadikh also received the name Sadigjan. Such an honor, besides him, was given only to the famous singer - Abdul-Bagi Zulalov, who was called Bulbuljan.

=== Shiri-Khurshid ===
In the beginning, Sadigjan, accompanying Haji Husi, made up a trio together with him and the kemanchist Ata Bagdagul oglu. Later, he moved to the Shusha khanende Mashadi Isi trio. In 1880, as part of it, he received an invitation to Tabriz for the wedding of Mozafereddin Qajar Mirza, the son of Nasreddin Shah Qajar. Many other musicians and singers also performed at the wedding, but Haji Husi and Sadikh were recognized as the best khanende and tar player and were awarded the Shiri-Khurshid order.

According to Aghalarbey Aliverdibeyov, the author of the “Harun al-Rashid” opera and a connoisseur of Azerbaijani musical history, at the mentioned above wedding, a well-known tar player challenged Sadigjan to a musical duel. He also stated that the good performance of Mirza Sadikh was possible thanks to the changes made on the fretboard of the instrument, in the fret system of the tar. Sadigjan accepted the challenge, but at the same time cut all the pointers on the instrument's neck. Seeing this, the opponent refused to participate and kissed the fingers of Mirza Sadikh.

=== Sadigjan's ensemble ===
In the 1890s, under the leadership of Sadigjan, an ensemble was created in Shusha, which included famous singers and musicians of that time. Among them were Haji Husu, Mashadi Isi, Jabbar Garyaghdioglu, Deli Ismail, Khanlyg Shukur, Bulbuljan, Kechachioghlu Muhammed, the tar player Ter-Vartanesov, Mashadi Zeynal and others. Two girls also participated in the ensemble performing Azerbaijani, Georgian, Armenian dances, as well as the belly dance. Among the participants was the mutrub Mirza Ismail, who played a prominent role in the ensemble. Although it was not necessary for his role, he was not only a good tar player, but also had an excellent voice. Among the ensemble's musicians, in addition to Azerbaijanis, were Georgians, Armenians, and Lezgins. The ensemble's performance took place in the concert halls of Shusha, Baku, Ganja, Ashgabat, Tehran, Istanbul, Derbent, Vladikavkaz, at the musical meetings of Khurshidbanu Natavan, Mahmud-agha, Mashadi Melik, in the gardens of Tiflis ("Mushtekhid") and İravan ("Khurrem").

Sadigjan also showed himself as a teacher. Among his students were such famous musicians as Gurban Pirimov, Mashadi Zeynal, Arsen Yaramyshev, Mardi Janibekov, Hamid Malybeyli, Tatevos Artyunyan, Mashadi Jamil Amirov, Shirin Akhundov and others.

Sadigjan died in 1902 in Shusha at the age of 56.

== Performance technique ==
Sadigjan at one time was recognized as "the first tar player in the entire Caucasus". According to the Honored Artist of Azerbaijan Sahib Pashazade, "the possibilities of his performance technique surpass all boundaries". From a young age, Sadigjan studied the performance techniques with great persistence. According to the composer and musicologist Afrasiyab Badalbeyli, he sometimes achieved various sounds without using his right hand (without mizrab), only with the fingers of his left hand, hitting the strings in a special way or pressing the strings, pulling them along the frets to lengthen various sounds reminiscent of glissando. In addition to these, Mirza Sadikh created such performance techniques as the “khun” effect (based on the resonation of the entire body of the tar obtained by shaking the neck of the instrument in accordance with the nature of the performance), the use of a small body or pressing the string to the neck of the tar, extracting sounds by plucking up to change the timbre of the instrument, etc.

In order to make the fingertips of his left hand harder, Mirza Sadikh lubricated them with a liquid of his own preparation, holding them also over a burning candle. It is known that the use of mizrab leads to the damage of the frets over time. To avoid this, Sadikh covered them with a special solution.

The Baku musical meeting organizer's son, Mashadi Melik, a famous tar player and the father of Bahram Mansurov, Mashadi Suleyman Mansurov, when firstly saw Mirza Sadikh in Tiflis, recalled that “his amazing playing on the tar had some kind of incomprehensible power over people”. He played virtuoso without a mizrab raising the instrument to his chin, and sometimes played with the tar leaning it to his neck. Sometimes, like ashigs, he raised the tar over his head.

According to eyewitnesses, Sadikhjan was able to teach the thrush several small tesnifs and songs by playing the tar. According to a story of his student Gurban Pirimov, Mirza Sadikh asked him to catch a nightingale from Gulably for him. Pirimov, along with the nightingale, brought and a thrush. Once, having come to Sadigjan again, he saw that he had put a mirror in front of the thrush, while he himself was playing tesnif on the tar, similar in sound to the singing of thrushes in the wild. The thrush, having seen the reflection in the mirror, begun to sing.

== Creation of the Azerbaijani tar ==
In the second half of the 19th century, the performance capabilities of the five-stringed tar no longer met the requirements of the rapidly developing Azerbaijani mugham art, and a need arose for a radical reconstruction of the instrument. Sadikhjan, for the first time, made a number of significant and bold innovations in the tar's performance and in the structure of the instrument. These were fundamental changes in the body, strings and frets of the instrument. The time has shown that this innovation paid off.

The body of the five-stringed tar is large in volume, and this does not allow lifting it to the chest. It is played on the knees, sometimes using a footstool. The length of a standard tar in Iran is 950 mm, the maximum width is 250 mm, with the depth of 200 mm, the length of the neck is 600 mm. The large dimensions reduce the possibilities of execution technique. The sound is soft and quiet.

=== Strings ===
Sadikhan firstly increased the number of strings from 5 to 18, then reduced their number to 11 - two three-choir ones at the bottom (“kok” - white, yellow main strings), in the middle - a single one (“bem kok” - tone thick red string used for a richer sound, as well as for chords) and a steam room (“dem” - the main strings for playing a melody) are bass, and on the upper side of the fretboard there are two paired sonorous ones (“zeng simler”, “jingene simler” - white resonant strings). The aliquot strings (resonant strings not used during the performance) — sonorous and tonal — added by Mirza Sadikh made the sound of the timbre effects of the instrument richer and increased the performance technique's possibilities. The presence of these strings contributed to the emergence of a special interpretation of the mugham on the tar. During the accompaniment of the khanende, aliquot strings create an organ point with the help of the vibrational effect “khun”, making mugham melodies more varied and brighter. They play a big role in the performance of the complex pieces, ensuring the perfection of the sound. So, in the process of performing mughams, as well as concerts, and plays written for tar, the richness of the sound is achieved thanks to these strings. In the course of his work on improving the instrument, Sadikhjan used the theoretical knowledge of the musicologists Safiaddin Urmavi and Mir Mohsun Navvab. After the death of Sadikhjan, the number of strings was reduced to 11.

== Contribution to the Azerbaijani music ==
Improving the tar opened a new page in the history of both the instrument itself and of the Azerbaijani mugham art in general. The changes made in the frets' location and, in general, in the structure of the instrument influenced the mugham fret system. This, in turn, led to changes in the art of mugham singing. The new style of the instrumental performance had an impact on the very manner of the khanende singing, since its performance was always accompanied by tar and kemancha.

Sadigjan made significant innovations in the Azerbaijani mugham. He improved the “Segah” mugham by adding the tones of “Zabul”, and to the mugham “Mirza Huseyn Segah” - adding the tones of the “Mukhalif” mugham. He significantly improved the mugham "Mahur". According to some data, we are allowed to talk about him as a composer. To the mughams "Orta Segah" and "Bayaty Shiraz", Mirza Sadikh wrote the instrumental additions (ryang). The ryangs reached their highest development precisely after the reconstruction of the instrument carried out by Mirza Sadikh. Sadigjan and his students became the authors of many famous examples of this genre later being classified as classic. According to the art critic Fikret Abulgasimov, the songs he wrote, tesnifs, ryangs, those dedicated to the homeland, demonstrate the power of the folk art, this is clearly seen thanks to their aesthetic power of influence and deep vitality.

In 1897, in Shusha, Mirza Sadikh taling an active part in the production of the “Leyli and Majnun” play, based on Fuzuli's poem with adaptations in the religious style “Shabeh”, he also engaged in its musical arrangement. The performance was staged at the Khandamirov Theater according to the script of Abdurrahim bey Hagverdiyev, the writer. The ensemble of Sadigjan performed the composition "Shebi-Hijran" for the choir. Many years later, Uzeyir Hajibeyov, who sang in the choir of this performance, recalled:

I started working on the opera in 1907, however I had this idea much earlier, around 1897-1898, when being a thirteen-year-old child, I saw the scene "Majnun over the grave of Leyli" performed by amateur actors in my native city Shusha. This scene impressed me so much that when I arrived to Baku a few years later, I decided to write something like an opera.

Sadigjan is also known as the creator of several mughams. Before him, there was only one dastgah (the largest form of mugham) of the mugham "Mahur", later two forms of its performance appeared - "Mahur-Hindi" and "Orta Mahur". From the memoirs of the famous mugham performer Jabbar Garyaghdioglu:

In the second half of the 19th century, "Mahur-Hindi" was created by the famous tarist of Azerbaijan Sadykhjan for the singers singing in a low voice.

The appearance in the Azerbaijani music of such mughams as "Mahur-Hindi", "Orta Mahur", "Zabul Segah", "Kharij Segah", "Mirza Huseyn Segahy", "Etim Segah", "Choban Bayaty" is associated with the creation of Mirza Sadikh and with the Azerbaijani tar. The famous Azerbaijani composer and musicologist Afrasiyab Badalbeyli, speaking about the innovations brought to Azerbaijani music by Sadikhjan, wrote that “starting with Mirza Sadikh, the essence of mughamat, the means of its expression, its power of influence and style of performance have risen to a new level. Mirza Sadikh opened a new page of the Azerbaijani music”.

In 1901, Sadikhjan took part in the first Oriental concert held in Shusha performing solo the mugham "Mahur".
