= Jabbar Garyaghdioglu =

Azerbaijani folk singer (1861–1944)

Jabbar Garyagdioglu
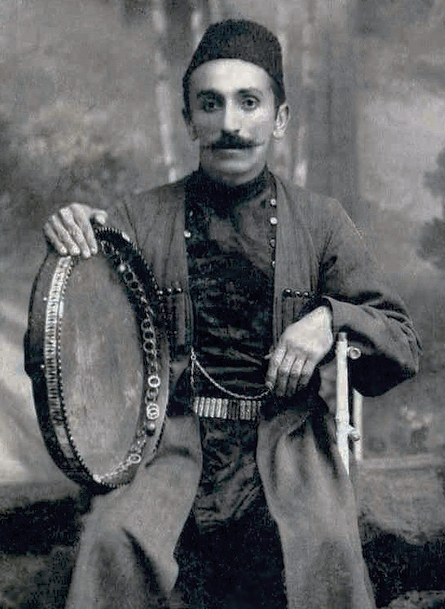
- Jabbar Garyagdioglu

Background information
- Born: 31 March 1861; Shusha, present-day Azerbaijan
- Died: 20 April 1944 (aged 83) Baku, Azerbaijan
- Genres: Folk
- Years active: 1876–1944

Jabbar Garyagdioglu or Garyaghdyoglu (Azerbaijani: Cabbar Qaryağdıoğlu pronounced [dʒɑpˈbɑɾ ɡɑɾjɑɣdɯoɣˈlu]) (31 March 1861 – 20 April 1944) was an Azerbaijani folk singer (khananda). He is known as the first khananda to perform mughamats in the Azeri language. He mostly sang in Azerbaijani and Persian. He was widely known both as a khanende and as a composer who performed both folk songs and his own song compositions; he was the author of new texts - tesnifs. His song "Baku" enjoyed great popularity in the 1930s-1940s. Jabbar Karjagdyoglu was also known outside the Caucasus. The art of the singer was admired by Uzeir Hajibeyov and Fedor Shalyapin, Sergei Yesenin and Bulbul, and Reingold Glier. In 1906-1912 his voice was recorded by a number of joint stock companies (record companies) in Kiev, Moscow, Warsaw. In the Great Soviet Encyclopedia Karjagdy is called the biggest khanende, an expert in Azerbaijani folk music.

== Biography ==
=== Childhood and youth ===
He was born in the Seyidlar neighborhood of Shusha to a family of a dyer. His stage name, Garyagdioglu, literally translates from Azeri as Son of Snow-Has-Fallen. According to an urban legend, Jabbar's father, Meshadi Ismayil, was an extremely reserved and taciturn man and as a result, would often be asked in an idiomatic way common to Azeri: "Why are you so gloomy? Has the snow fallen?" Therefore, he was nicknamed Garyagdi (Anglicisation of qar yağdı - "snow has fallen"). Meshadi Ismail wanted to teach little Jabbar the craft of the dyer. However, this did not happen. His son, who dreamed of becoming a singer, never learned the craft of his father. In the second half of the 19th century, most residents of Shusha were engaged in trade and crafts. But there were many servants of faith. Meshadi Ismail himself was a strong believer. He, along with his sons, took part in religious ceremonies. Despite his father's plans, Jabbar did not take up his business and decided to become a singer. His older brother, an amateur folk singer, played an important role in young Jabbar's passion for music. In 1871–1876 Garyagdioglu attended school, where he took vocal lessons, studied the theory of music and the Persian language. While still in his teens, he was accepted into the ensemble of the notable musician Sadigjan. Until age 20, he performed primarily in his native Karabakh, but soon he became famous in other parts of the South Caucasus, and later would make tours to Iran and Central Asia.

== Later life ==
Until he was 20, Jabbar Karjagdyoglu was known only in his native Shusha, but soon he will be recognized far beyond his native city. Jabbar is invited to Baku, Ganja, Shemakha, Agdash. One night in the village of Agdash in the Mejlis in the caravan-sarae Garabek Sadikhjan began to play "Garabagh shikestyasi", and Jabbar began to sing along with him. Waking up, townspeople gathered at the caravanserai to listen to the performance of the Shusha musicians. Cossacks of the mayor tried to disperse the crowd, but people dispersed to their homes only after the singing ended. The glory of Jabbar Karjagdyoglu reached Georgia, Central Asia, Iran, and Turkey. Jabbar Karjagdyoglu was the first khanende who sang mugham in theatrical and concert stages. Thus, in Shusha in 1897, under the leadership of the prominent writer-playwright Abdurrahimbek Akhverdiyev, the musical scene "Majnun on the Tomb of Leili" by Nizami Ganjavi's poem "Leili and Majnun" was played by Jabbar Karyagdyoglu . The performance made a huge impression on the audience. Uzeyir Hajibeyov, who at that time was thirteen years old, watched with great excitement the game of Jabbar Karjagdyoglu. In 1900, in Shusha, was a musical scene based on the poem of Alisher Navoi "Farhad and Shirin". In the role of Farhad, the same Jabbar Karjagdyogli. In 1901, Garyagdioglu moved to the oil-booming Baku that at the time was rapidly becoming an important social and cultural city of the region. Together with Uzeyir Hajibeyov and other prominent musicians, he founded a club in the Baku suburb of Balakhany and would give charity concerts to support the poor. Between 1906 and 1912, he visited Kiev, Moscow and Warsaw together with other Azeri khanandas, where a vinyl recording of his performance was made. On his way back from Warsaw, he and his ensemble gave a successful two-day Oriental concert in Moscow. Garyagdioglu mostly sang in Azeri and Persian; however, some mughamats were performed in Georgian, Armenian, Uzbek, and Turkmen. For 20 years, he was accompanied by sazandas Gurban Pirimov (tar) and Sasha Ohanezashvili (kamancheh). In 1916, he appeared in the Azeri film Neft va milyonlar saltanatinda ("In the Realm of Oil and Millions"). After Sovietization, he taught classical music at the Azerbaijan State Conservatoire and was the soloist of the Azerbaijan State Philharmonic Society. During his long musical career, he collected and recorded around 500 folk songs and tunes, which became part of the conservatoire's record library.

=== Rise to prominence ===
From the beginning of the 1920s, Karjagdyoglu took an active part in the public life of the republic. The singer stood at the origins of the creation of the national conservatory and played an important role in the formation of new cadres. In addition to teaching, he was a consultant to the research room of Azerbaijani music at the conservatory. Jabbar Karjagdyoglu was a supporter of the transposition of mugams to notes and in this work assisted the composer Fikret Amirov. The singer for a long time was the soloist of the Azerbaijan State Philharmonic named after Muslim Magomayev. Over more than half a century of creative work, Khanende collected more than 500 folk songs and musical fragments. Uzeyir Hajibeyov and Muslim Magomayev put on more than 30 of his songs. The singer has greatly assisted Rheingold Gliere in studying Azerbaijani folk music. Bulbul records the voice of Jabbar Karjagdyoglu In 1934, with the assistance of Jabbar Karjagdyoglu, the research room of Azerbaijani music, headed by Bulbul, recorded about 300 folk songs and tesnifs. Jabbar Karjagdyoglu sang these songs, and Bulbul recorded them on a phonvalik. Said Rustamov, over 50 songs have been translated and published in a separate book in Azerbaijani and Russian languages. May 30, 1934 in Tbilisi hosted the Olympics of the art of the peoples of Transcaucasia. It was attended by 1,900 people representing 17 nationalities. 74-year-old Jabbar Karjagdyoglu was awarded the first prize. File: Jabbar Qaryaqady, Qurban Pirimov, and Qılman Salahov.ogv Jabbar Karjagdyoglu performs the mugam "Eyraty". Gurban Pirimov accompanies him on the tare, on the kemanche - Gulman Salakhov In 1939, three Tesniffa ("Leili", "Shirin" and "Sarandj Tesnifi") were recorded on the verses of Nizami Ganjavi from the voice of Jabbar Karyagdy Kara Karaev. Jabbar Karjagdyoglu lived to an old age, sang to the last days of his life. At the age of seventy-two he sang one of the most difficult parts of mugam "Uzzal", accompanied by tar player Gurban Pirimov. Jabbar Karjagdyoglu died on 20 April 1944 at the age of 83 years.

== See also ==
- No moles left in Irevan
