= Khananda =

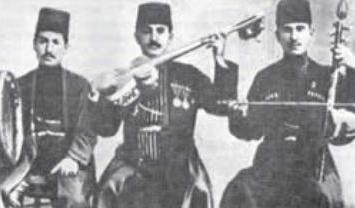
A traditional Azeri mugham trio with the khananda (left) as the daf-player

A khananda (Azerbaijani: xanəndə خواننده [xɑnænˈdæ]; Persian: خواننده; alternative spellings in English: khanende, khanande, khanandeh) is a name generally given to singers of mugham, a folk music genre similar to maqam. The word is of Persian origin and means "singer". When performing traditional mugham, a khananda is accompanied by a trio of musicians who play the tar, the kamancheh and the daf (tambourine). Often the khananda is the daf-player.

== Origins and development ==
The exact origins of the art of khanandas have not been studied thoroughly however it is likely that it emerged during the urbanization in the medieval epoch. In the growing cities, khanandas would perform at the events organized by the nobility, on weddings and fairs, in caravanserais and tea houses. With Persian being the main language of the local literature at the time (mugham lyrics were based on Classical Islamic poetry), khanandas used it in their performance and therefore gained popularity mostly among the aristocracy. Small town and village-dwellers to whom the Persian language was alien preferred the music of the ashigs (traveling bards singing in a vernacular language). Classical khanandas followed a specific dress code which included a chokha, an arkhalig, an astrakhan cap (papag), rings and a belt decorated with gold. Some would even decorate their musical instruments depending on their status and prominence. Khanandas would traditionally gather in salons known as majlis-i khananda.

While traditionally khandadas were trained privately, in the 1870s a Shushavian khananda Kharrat Gulu established the first school of mugham where future singers would undergo professional training. A khananda who was required to have no less than a two-octave voice range would be tested on the knowledge of mugham subgenres, including their vocal performance, as well as classical poetry. If a khananda's specialization included playing an instrument he or she would be required to demonstrate proficiency in both solo and accompanied performance. A khananda who successfully passed the exam gained the title of ustad ("master").

Starting from the late 1800s khanandas started acting in theatres incorporating mugham into musical plays. In the past decades a practice of khananda duets has been introduced in Azerbaijan.

== See also ==
- Music of Azerbaijan
- Sazanda
- Bulbul (singer)
- Khan Shushinski
- Alim Qasimov
- Bulbuljan
- Rubaba Muradova
