= Bust of Bulbul =

Bronze bust in Shusha, Azerbaijani

Bust of Bulbul Bülbülün büstü
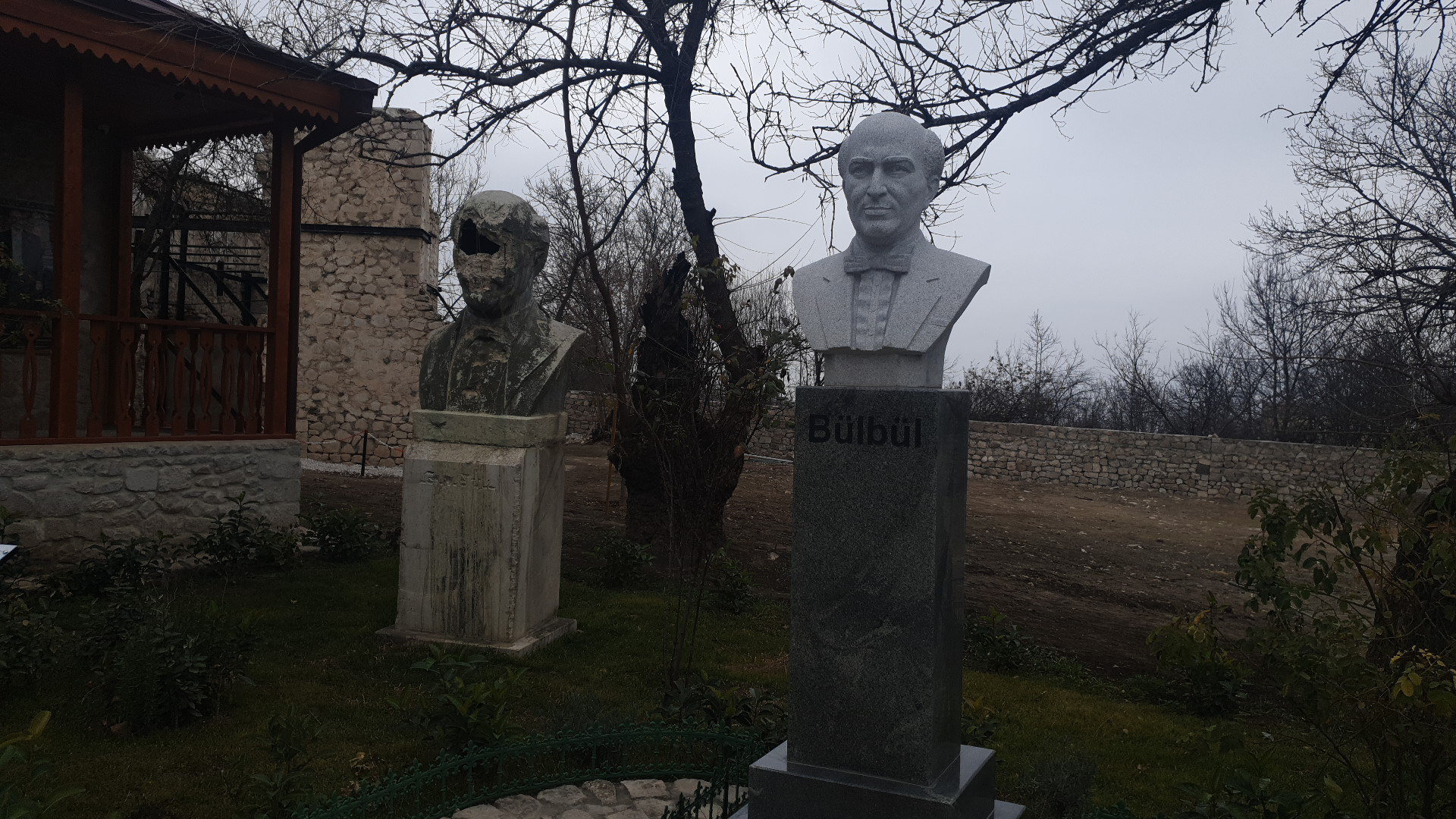
- The old and new version of the bust. House-Museum of Bulbul
- Location: House-Museum of Bulbul, Shusha, Azerbaijan
- Designer: Namig Dadashov
- Material: bronze
- Completion date: 1984
- Dedicated date: Bulbul

Bust of Bulbul (Azerbaijani: Bülbülün büstü) is a bronze bust erected in the city of Shusha.

== About ==
The bust was riddled with bullets by Armenians and after the capture of Shusha in 1992, together with the busts of Natavan and Uzeyir Hajibeyov, it was taken to the territory of Georgia to be sold as metal. Later, these busts were bought by the Azerbaijani authorities. The busts were brought to Baku on the initiative of Bulbul's son Polad Bulbuloghlu.

In 2021, as a result of the restoration works, the newly made bust was erected in the house-museum.
