= Şən Azərbaycan =

"Şən Azərbaycan" "Шән Азәрбајҹан"

Song
- Language: Azerbaijani, Russian
- English title: Merry Azerbaijan
- Written: 1970
- Composer: Polad Bulbuloghlu
- Lyricists: Mestan Guner (Azerbaijani); Onegin Gadgikasimov (Russian)

"Şən Azərbaycan" (Azerbaijani Cyrillic: "Шән Азәрбајҹан", English: "Merry Azerbaijan") is a Soviet-era patriotic song about Soviet Azerbaijan that still remains popular in modern Azerbaijan. It was written in 1970 and was sung by Polad Bulbuloghlu, Muslim Magomayev, Shovkat Alakbarova, and Idris Mehdiyev, among others.

During the Soviet era, the song was often sung in both Azerbaijani and Russian. After the collapse of the USSR, the Russian lyrics fell out of popularity and are typically no longer sung.

== Azerbaijani lyrics ==
"Şən Azərbaycan" in Azerbaijani

Azerbaijani (Cyrillic)	Azerbaijani (Latin)	English
Гој мән јенә сөһбәт ачым илк баһарымдан, Нәғмәм илә бир дә кечим өз дијарымдан.	Qoy mən yenə söhbət açım ilk baharımdan, Nəğməm ilə bir də keçim öz diyarımdan.	Let me tell you again about my first spring, Let me pass on the song of my motherland.
Нәгарәт : Бол бәһрәли Муған дүзү, Мил дүзү, Ширван дүзү, «Ҝәл-ҝәл» дејир, шән Азәрбајҹан. Тәр ҝүлләри шәфалыдыр, Ҝөјҝөл нә сәфалыдыр, Һәр јаны ҝүлшән Азәрбајҹан!	Nəqarət : Bol bəhrəli Muğan düzü, Mil düzü, Şirvan düzü, «Gəl-gəl» deyir, şən Azərbaycan. Tər gülləri şəfalıdır, Göygöl nə səfalıdır, Hər yanı gülşən Azərbaycan!	Chorus : Plentiful Mugan Plain, Mil Plain, Shirvan Plain, "Come here", says merry Azerbaijan. Healing fresh flowers, Scenic Lake Goygol, Everywhere is a flower garden, Azerbaijan!
Ел гызлары дүзүн-дүзүн Күр гырағында, Мин ҝүл ачыр Ҝәнҹәмизин һәр будағында. Дост елләри Гарабағын дағ вүгарлыды, Ҝен чөлләри бу торпағын хош баһарлыды.	El qızları düzün-düzün Kür qırağında, Min gül açır Gəncəmizin hər budağında. Dost elləri Qarabağın dağ vüqarlıdı, Gen çölləri bu torpağın xoş baharlıdı.	The daughters of the land line the banks of the Kura, A thousand flowers bloom on every branch of our Ganja. Friendly mountains stand proudly in the lands of Karabakh, The steppes of this land are pleasant in the spring.
Нәгарәт : Бол бәһрәли Муған дүзү, Мил дүзү, Ширван дүзү, «Ҝәл-ҝәл» дејир, шән Азәрбајҹан. Тәр ҝүлләри шәфалыдыр, Ҝөјҝөл нә сәфалыдыр, Һәр јаны ҝүлшән Азәрбајҹан!	Nəqarət : Bol bəhrəli Muğan düzü, Mil düzü, Şirvan düzü, «Gəl-gəl» deyir, şən Azərbaycan. Tər gülləri şəfalıdır, Göygöl nə səfalıdır, Hər yanı gülşən Azərbaycan!	Chorus : Plentiful Mugan Plain, Mil Plain, Shirvan Plain, "Come here", says merry Azerbaijan. Healing fresh flowers, Scenic Lake Goygol, Everywhere is a flower garden, Azerbaijan!
Һәр дамласы лајла чалан ҝөј Хәзәрин вар. Һәр улдузу нәғмә олан мин шәһәрин вар. Күчдим јенә чичәк-чичәк һәр маһалындан, Өз јурдумун дојмаз үрәк јүз вүсалындан.	Hər damlası layla çalan göy Xəzərin var. Hər ulduzu nəğmə olan min şəhərin var. Küçdim yenə çiçək-çiçək hər mahalından, Öz yurdumun doymaz ürək yüz vüsalından.	There is a lullaby in every drop of the Caspian's water. For each of our cities, there are a thousand singing stars. I have gone to each flowery district across this land, From the boundless joy-filled heart of my motherland.
Нәгарәт : Бол бәһрәли Муған дүзү, Мил дүзү, Ширван дүзү, «Ҝәл-ҝәл» дејир, шән Азәрбајҹан. Тәр ҝүлләри шәфалыдыр, Ҝөјҝөл нә сәфалыдыр, Һәр јаны ҝүлшән Азәрбајҹан!	Nəqarət : Bol bəhrəli Muğan düzü, Mil düzü, Şirvan düzü, «Gəl-gəl» deyir, şən Azərbaycan. Tər gülləri şəfalıdır, Göygöl nə səfalıdır, Hər yanı gülşən Azərbaycan!	Chorus : Plentiful Mugan Plain, Mil Plain, Shirvan Plain, "Come here", says merry Azerbaijan. Healing fresh flowers, Scenic Lake Goygol, Everywhere is a flower garden, Azerbaijan!

== Russian version ==
Due to Russian being the de facto official language of the Soviet Union, a Russian-language version was produced alongside the Azerbaijani-language version. It is known in Russian as "Мой Азербайджан" (English: My Azerbaijan). This version was written by Onegin Gadgikasimov, a Soviet Azerbaijani poet of Russian background. However, it is rarely sung anymore in Azerbaijan following the collapse of the USSR.

"Şən Azərbaycan" in Russian

Russian	Transliteration	English
Снова сердце песню просит, чтобы вместе с ней Смог я обойти просторы родины моей.	Snova serdtse pesnyu prosit, chtoby vmeste s ney Smog ya oboyti prostory rodiny moyey.	Again my heart asks for a song, so that together We may journey across my vast motherland.
Припев : В шапках белоснежных горы, В небо взметнулись гордо, Солнце дарит молодость садам. Мчатся, сверкая реки, С детства влюблен навеки, Я в твою весну, Азербайджан!	Pripev : V shapkakh belosnezhnykh gory, V nebo vzmetnulis' gordo, Solntse darit molodost' sadam. Mchatsya, sverkaya reki, S detstva vlyublen naveki, Ya v tvoyu vesnu, Azerbaidzhan!	Chorus : Amidst the snow-white mountain caps, In the sky proudly soaring, The sun gives youth to the gardens. Rushing, sparkling rivers, Since childhood, in love forever, I'm in your spring, Azerbaijan!
Девушек прекрасней наших в целом мире нет, В песнях их воспел недаром не один поэт. Озеро Гёйгёль зовется жемчугом в горах, Краем соловьев зовется гордый Карабах.	Devushek prekrasney nashikh v tselom mire nyet, V pesnyakh ikh vospel nedarom ne odin poet. Ozero Goygol' zovetsya zhemchugom v gorakh, Krayem solov'yev zovetsya gordyy Karabakh.	Nowhere else in the world will you find as beautiful girls, Not without reason has more than one poet sung her song. It calls pearly Lake Goygol in the mountains, At the far edges, it calls mountainous Karabakh.
Припев : В шапках белоснежных горы, В небо взметнулись гордо, Солнце дарит молодость садам. Мчатся, сверкая реки, С детства влюблен навеки, Я в твою весну, Азербайджан!	Pripev : V shapkakh belosnezhnykh gory, V nebo vzmetnulis' gordo, Solntse darit molodost' sadam. Mchatsya, sverkaya reki, S detstva vlyublen naveki, Ya v tvoyu vesnu, Azerbaidzhan!	Chorus : Amidst the snow-white mountain caps, In the sky proudly soaring, The sun gives youth to the gardens. Rushing, sparkling rivers, Since childhood, in love forever, I'm in your spring, Azerbaijan!
Песня в каждой звонкой капле Каспия слышна, В ней воспет Баку родной и древняя Гянджа. Нет конца у этой песни, потому что в ней Все слова идут от сердца о земле моей.	Pesnya v kazhdoy zvonkoy kaple Kaspiya slyshna, V ney vospet Baku rodnoy i drevnyaya Gyandzha. Nyet kontsa u etoy pesni, potomu chto v ney Vse slova idut ot serdtsa o zemle moyey.	The song in every drop of the Caspian is audible, It sings of our native Baku and ancient Ganja. There is no end to this song, for every one of These words about my land come from my heart.
Припев : В шапках белоснежных горы, В небо взметнулись гордо, Солнце дарит молодость садам. Мчатся, сверкая реки, С детства влюблен навеки, Я в твою весну, Азербайджан!	Pripev : V shapkakh belosnezhnykh gory, V nebo vzmetnulis' gordo, Solntse darit molodost' sadam. Mchatsya, sverkaya reki, S detstva vlyublen naveki, Ya v tvoyu vesnu, Azerbaidzhan!	Chorus : Amidst the snow-white mountain caps, In the sky proudly soaring, The sun gives youth to the gardens. Rushing, sparkling rivers, Since childhood, in love forever, I'm in your spring, Azerbaijan!
