= Jabir Novruz =

- Born: 12 March 1933 Upa, Khizi District, Azerbaijan SSR, Soviet Union
- Died: 12 December 2002 (aged 69) Baku, Azerbaijan
- Occupation: Poet, translator, editor
- Literary movement: Romanticism

Jabir Novruz (born Cabir Mirzəbəy oğlu Novruzov, 12 March 1933 – 12 December 2002) was an Azerbaijani and Soviet poet, translator, editor, and secretary of the Union of Azerbaijani Writers for three decades. Considered one of the most prominent authors of modern Azerbaijani poetry, his work is known for a romantic style that inspired patriotism. He was active in bringing important national issues to the attention of his fellow citizens, and was elected to the National Assembly in 1995. Through his translations, Novruz brought world poetry to the people of Azerbaijan, and his own works have been translated and published in other languages and have also been used as lyrics in many popular Azerbaijani songs.

== Biography ==
Jabir Novruz was born in the village of Upa in Khizi District. After completing secondary school, he studied at primary-school teachers' training college and in 1952 entered the Journalism Department at Baku State University. A year later, on the advice of the Union of Azerbaijani Writers, he was sent to the Maxim Gorky Literature Institute in Moscow to continue his studies, graduating in 1957.

Jabir Novruz started his career in the literary department of the evening newspaper Baku in 1958. He was employed as editor-in-chief of the literary magazine Azerbaijan in the years 1967–1970, and the newspaper Edebiyyat ve injesent in 1991–1993. He was the secretary of the Union of Azerbaijani Writers from 1970–1997. Owing to his literary translations, Azerbaijani readers have been exposed to numerous examples of world literature.

== Major themes in his poetry ==
Jabir Novruz's poetry is a synthesis of Azerbaijani literary traditions with modern literary currents. Early in his career, his poems earned national popularity for their humanist, spiritual and patriotic values. His works of lyric and epic poetry are notable for artistic character and thematic variety, yet have an elegant simplicity of literary language. Anxiety for the fate of the Homeland is typical in his poetry, inspiring a patriotic soul. The many songs composed for his poems are popular in Azerbaijani music, and most of Novruz's works have been translated and published in other languages.

== Social-political sphere ==
Jabir Novruz had been an active participant in the social and political events that occurred in Azerbaijan. He wrote for the common citizen, and gave objective estimates of dangerous events. In 1995, Jabir Novruz was elected a deputy of the Milli Məclis, the National Legislative Assembly of Azerbaijan.

== Awards and honors ==
- Honored Art Worker of the Azerbaijan SSR (1979)
- Order of the Red Banner of Labour (1986)
- People's Poet of Azerbaijan (1999)

== Legacy ==
As of 10 January 2014 there have been at least 128 songs composed on the poems of Jabir Novruz.

- "My Azerbaijan" – Brilliant Dadashova
- "The girls of Baki" – Aygun Kazimova
- "My fate" – Metanet Isgenderli
- "The parting" – Azerin
- "The life has passed" – Mubariz Tagiyev
- "The mountains I have leant on" – Elza Seyidjahan and Zabit Nebizade
- "I saw you" – Gulyanag Memmedova
- "My mother is getting older" – Yalchin Rzazade
- "Good bye" – Yalchin Rzazade
- "Life, how strange you are" – "Gaya" group
- "Parting" – Ilgar Muradov
- "Hurry up, men" – Reshid Behbudov
- "My youth" – Zeyneb Khanlarova
- "The years of studentship" – Elmira Rehimova
- "My name has come to this world"
- "When the dreams meet" – Yalchin Rzazade
- "Azerbaijan"
- "Song about Baki" – Ogtay Agayev
- "Ballad" – Eli Hagverdiyev
- "People of this world" – Zeyneb Khanlarova
- "Spring water, mountain air" – Zeyneb Khanlarova
- "Homeland calls" – E.Akhundoff
- "My youth" – Zeyneb Khanlarova
- "The world is one songr" – Y.Rzazade
- "What the world it is" – Nise Qasımova
- "The world does his work" – Fidan Qasımova
- "Good bye" – M.Tagıyev
- "I need you" – Z.Khanlarova
- "My sunny life" – Mobil Akhmedov
- "This world is still beautiful" – F.Kerimova
- "Life, how strange you are" – F.Kerimova
- "Life, how strange you are" – QAYA (in Russian)
- "the years, the roads" – QAYA.
- "Let the soul live in nation" – Y.Rzazade
- "The love doesn't look at age" – Z.Khanlarova
- "The love doesn't look at age" – M.Tagıyev
- "I won't be remembered" – Y.Rzazade
- "My feelings" – F.Kerimova
- "My love" – Kemalə Rehimli
- "Be courageous" – Y.Rzazade
- "I was born from the songs" – F.Rehimova
- "Azerbaijan, you are the song" – L.İmanov
- "You are equal to my life" – Eldar Akhundov
- "My black-eyed" – Z.Khanlarova
- "My mother is getting older" – Flora Kerimova
- "Don't let" – M.Tagıyev
- "The strange bayaties" – Z.Khanlarova
- "Estimate the men while they are alive" – Y.Rzazade
- "Compose the songs" – QAYA
- "I saw you" – F.Kerimova
- "I saw you" – N.Qasımova
- "I saw you" – Y.Rzazade
- "You are my life" – Eldar Akhundov
- "The love bayaties" – M.Kazımov
- "The love melancholy" – F.Kerimova
- "My fate" – F.Kerimova (in Russian)
- "My fate" – Y.Rzazade and İlkhame
- "Student" – "SEVİL" group
- "Student" – Elmira Rehimova
- "Student" – F.Kerimova
- "Hurry up, men" – R.Bekhbudov
- "The new year" – Gulaga Memmedov
- "When we have a hope" – Sekine İsmayılova
- "There is no part of the Homeland" – Mubariz Tagıyev
- "The dream" – Qasım Khalilov
- "The man makes live" – R.Bekhbudov
- "New meetings" – Eldar Akhundov
- "You don't have faith" – Y.Rzazade
- "Strike the all bells" – Yuliya Miroshnichenko (in Russian)

Video

- Shovkat Alakbarova – Məhəbbət (Love) on YouTube – composer : Oktay Kazimov|Oktay Kazimi
- Yalchın Rzazadeh – Bakının qızları (Baku girls) on YouTube – composer : Oktay Kazimov|Oktay Kazimi
- Yalchin Rzazadeh – Mənim duyğularım (My feelings) on YouTube – composer : Oktay Kazimov|Oktay Kazimi
- Zeynab Khanlarova – Cavanlığım (My youth) on YouTube – composer : Oktay Kazimov|Oktay Kazimi
- Zeynab Khanlarova – Bulaq suyu, dağ havası (Spring water and mountain whether) on YouTube – composer : Oktay Kazimov|Oktay Kazimi
- Yalchin Rzazadeh – Dünya düzələn deyil (The world will not improved) on YouTube – composer İqbal Agayev
- Yalchin Rzazadeh – Böyüməyə tələsmə (Don't hurry to become older) on YouTube – composer İqbal Agayev
- Manana Japaridze – Bu nə cür məhəbbətdir (What kind of love is it) on YouTube – composer Eldar Mansurov
- Aygun Kazımova – Səsim səsinə öyrəşib (My voice is used to your voice) on YouTube – composer Eldar Mansurov
- Mubariz Tagıyev – Ömür keçir (Life is running) on YouTube – composer: Eldar Mansurov
- Ruhengiz Abdullayeva – Məhəbbət ölməyəcək (Love will not die) on YouTube – composeri: Eldar Mansurov

== See also ==
- Golden Autumn-69
- Azerbaijani literature
