= Fikrat Goja =

Azerbaijani poet (1935–2021)

- Native name: Fikrət Qoca
- Born: Fikrat Gojayev; 25 August 1935 Agdash, Azerbaijan SSR, Soviet Union
- Died: 5 May 2021 (aged 85) Agdash, Azerbaijan
- Occupation: Poet
- Notable awards: People's Poet of Azerbaijan (1998)

Fikrat Goja (Azerbaijani: Fikrət Qoca, 25 August 1935 – 5 May 2021) was an Azerbaijani poet. He was honored as a People's Poet of Azerbaijan in 1998.

== Early life and education ==
Goja was born in Agdash. He attended Maxim Gorky Literature Institute of Moscow, graduating in 1964.

"The Woman Who Couldn't Find Words" was Goja's first published poem. Goja described it as "about a woman who was surprised about everything all the time. She was unable to understand the things that were going on in the world around her."

== Biography ==
Goja was the executive editor of Gobustan since 1978, and he was active in the Writer's Union of Azerbaijan, becoming secretary in 1997. Many of Goja's poems in Azeri have been published. They covered the struggle for freedom.

His books of poetry reflect his love for his homeland, his feelings of patriotism, and his thoughts on man and time. He has toured extensively in many countries and dedicated poems to national liberation movements in those countries, including Cuban freedom fighter Ernesto Che Guevara ("Addressless Letters"), Guinea-Bissau liberation movement activist Amilcar Cabral, Philippine nationalist protagonist Jose Risal, young Vietnamese Lee Vi Tom and by the poems he wrote. He wrote "Passers-by", "Human level", "Ordinary truths" and others in the 1990s about the ongoing struggle for freedom. Furthermore, he wrote a number of prose works. The events of January 20, 1990, are reflected in the stories "Death is not separation" (1990), "For now, until the Day of Judgment" (2000).

Goja translated works by Mikhail Lermontov, Taras Shevchenko, I. Volker, among others. His works have been translated into a number of foreign languages.

Music was composed for his poems ("Mother, my friend is getting married", "My heart", "Morning", "Come, morning", "I couldn't find a flower", "The night is too long", "Autumn has come", etc.).

His poem “Gel Ey Seher" (Come, Hey Morning) was set to music and became a popular song by Polad Bulbuloglu. In the late 1990s, Bubuloglu recorded a new version of Gel Ey Seher with an arrangement by Paul Buckmaster. While Bulbuloglu was having a huge success with the song and sold-out concerts in Russia, Bulbuloglu became the Minister of Culture of Azerbaijan and later, the Azerbaijani ambassador to Russia.

== Recognition ==
In 1968, Goja received the Lenin Komsomol Prize for a poem dedicated to youth heroism and valor.

In 2015, Goja was awarded the Sharaf Order of merit for his contributions to Azerbaijani literature. The ceremony took place at the Azerbaijan Writers Union.

On August 25, 2020, Goja was awarded the Istiglal Order by President Ilham Aliyev for his contribution to Azerbaijani culture.

== Death ==
Goja died on May 5, 2021, in Azerbaijan.[1]

== Awards ==
- "Lenin Komsomol" award of the Azerbaijan SSR — 1968
- Honored Art Worker of the Azerbaijan SSR — 30 July 1979
- Shohrat Order — June 26, 1995
- People's Poet of Azerbaijan honorary title — 23 May 1998
- Humay Award — 1998
- Individual pension of the President of the Republic of Azerbaijan — 11 June 2002
- Honorary Diploma of the President of the Republic of Azerbaijan — 16 July 2010
- Sharaf Order — 1 September 2015
- State Prize of the Republic of Azerbaijan — 26 May 2016
- Istiglal Order — 24 August 2020

== Books ==
- Qağayı (1963)
- Hamıya borcluyam (1965)
- Yatmadığım gecələrdə (1970)
- Günlərin bir günü (1972)
- Gül ömrü (1975)
- İnsan xasiyyəti (1980)
- Ömürdən səhifələr (1984)
- Mavi dünyanın adamları (1988)
- Taleyin ağır taleyi (1993)
- Dənizdə ay çiməndə (1967)
- Seçilmiş əsərləri (2014)
