= Adelaida Mammadova =

Azerbaijani musician-scientist

Adelaida Irza gizi Mammadova
- Born: 22 August 1922; Tiflis, Georgia SSR
- Died: 25 April 2015 (aged 92); Baku, Azerbaijan
- Citizenship: Soviet Union; Republic of Azerbaijan; France
- Occupation: Scholar

Adelaida Mammadova (22 August 1922; Tiflis, Georgia SSR - 25 April 2015; Baku, Azerbaijan) was an Azerbaijani musician-scientist, educator, public figure and Recipient of the Shohrat Order.

She was the wife of musical artist Bulbul and mother of the singer Polad Bülbüloğlu.

== Life ==
After the death of Bulbul, the renowned singer of Azerbaijan and the Soviet Union, in 1977, Mammadova was appointed as the director of the Bulbul House Museum established in Shusha. Under her leadership, more than 6,000 documents related to Bulbul were compiled. She delved into Bulbul's creativity in the academic field, writing various books and articles about the art of music. The museum under her guidance was dispersed after being occupied by Armenians in Shusha in 1992.

She died on April 25, 2015, and was laid to rest in the II Alley of Honor.

== Selected works ==
- "Бюлъ-Бюлъ", Baku, 1964
- "Bülbül", Baku, 1967
- "Маэстро Бюлъ-Бюлъ; К 110-летию со дня рождения Бюлъ-Бюля", Baku, 2007
- "Маэстро Бюлъ-Бюлъ", Baku, 2009
- "Бюлъ-Бюлъ вокалист мирового класса", Baku, 2010
- "Bizim Bülbül -Dünyanın Bülbülü", Baku, 2011
- "Bülbül Bütün Zamanların Nəğməkarı.Бюлъ-Бюлъ Певец Всех Времен", Baku, 2012

== Awards ==
List:

- Honorary Diploma of President
- Shohrat Order
