= House-Museum of Bulbul =

Museum in Baku, Azerbaijan

- Bülbülün ev muzeyi (Azerbaijani)
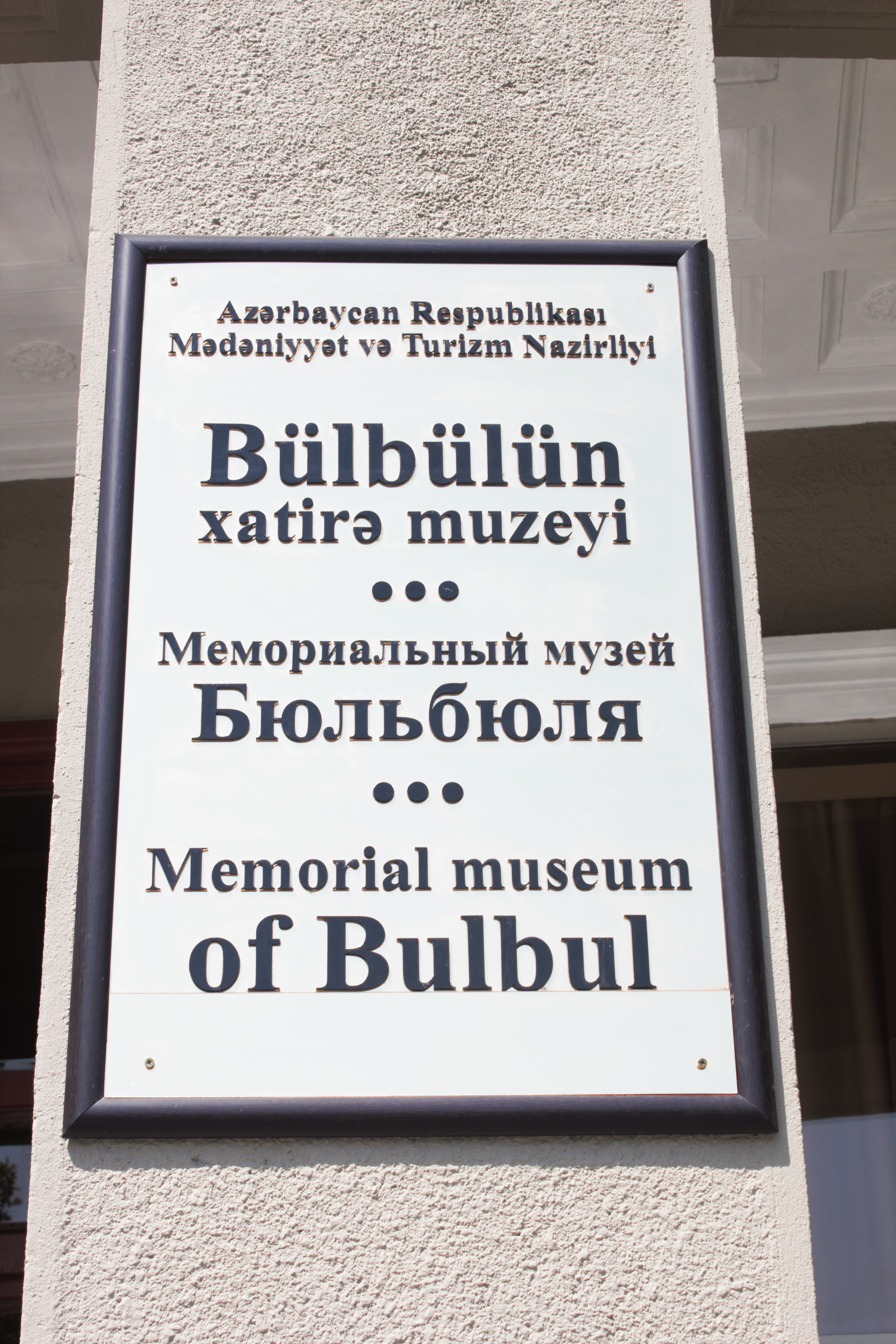
- Entrance of the House-Museum of Bulbul
- Established: 1976
- Coordinates: 40°22′23″N 49°50′38″E

House Museum of Bulbul (Azerbaijani: Bülbülün ev muzeyi) or Memorial Museum of Bulbul (Azerbaijani: Bülbülün xatirə muzeyi) is a historic house museum of famous Azerbaijani Soviet singer Bulbul. The memorial museum was created in 1976 on the personal initiative of Heydar Aliyev and the museum had a ceremonial opening in 1982. The museum is located in Bulbul 15, Sabail, Baku.

== History ==
The Memorial Museum of Bulbul was created in 1976 on the personal initiative of the First Secretary of the Central Committee of the Communist Party of Azerbaijan—Heydar Aliyev. In this apartment, Bulbul has lived and worked since 1937 until the last days of his life, until September 26, 1961. On July 1, 1977, his wife—Mammadova was appointed as the director of the Memorial Museum of Bulbul. On June 10, 1982, the Memorial Museum of Bulbul in Baku had a ceremonial opening.

== Exposition ==
The museum was placed in 4 exposition rooms. 3 rooms are kept as a souvenir, one is an exhibition room. The museum collects documents and materials about Bulbul's creative, scientific, pedagogical, social activities. Among them there are original manuscripts, gramophone shafts, photographs, notes, books, household items, artwork and personal belongings. Branches: House-Museum of Bulbul in Shusha. But since 1992, after the capture of Shusha in 1992 by Armenian forces, it has stopped its activity.

== Gallery ==
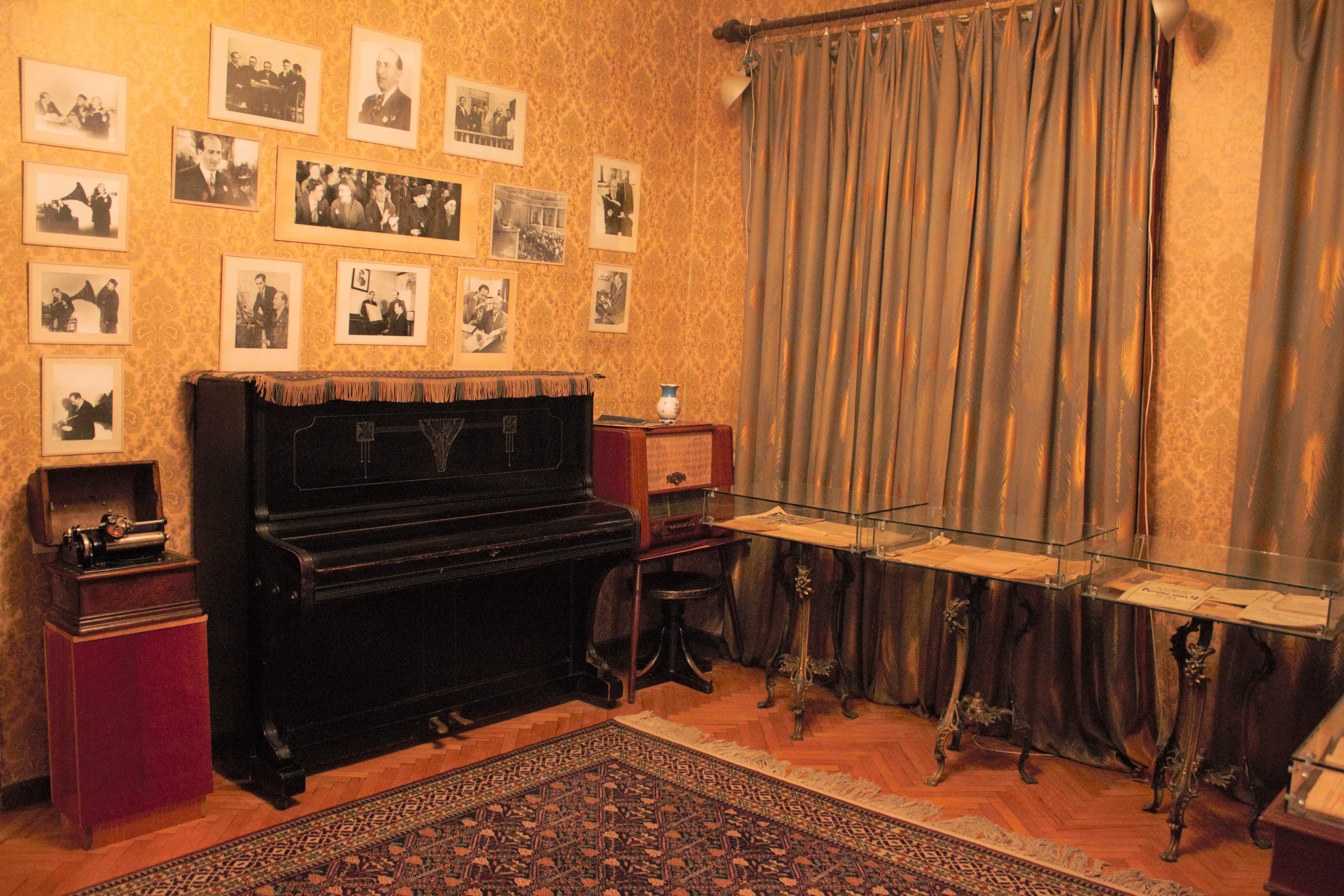
Interior of the Bulbul's Memorial Museum. This room was an office. It was in this room that new concert programs were invented, new operas were created, new thoughts on the development of Azerbaijani art ripened.

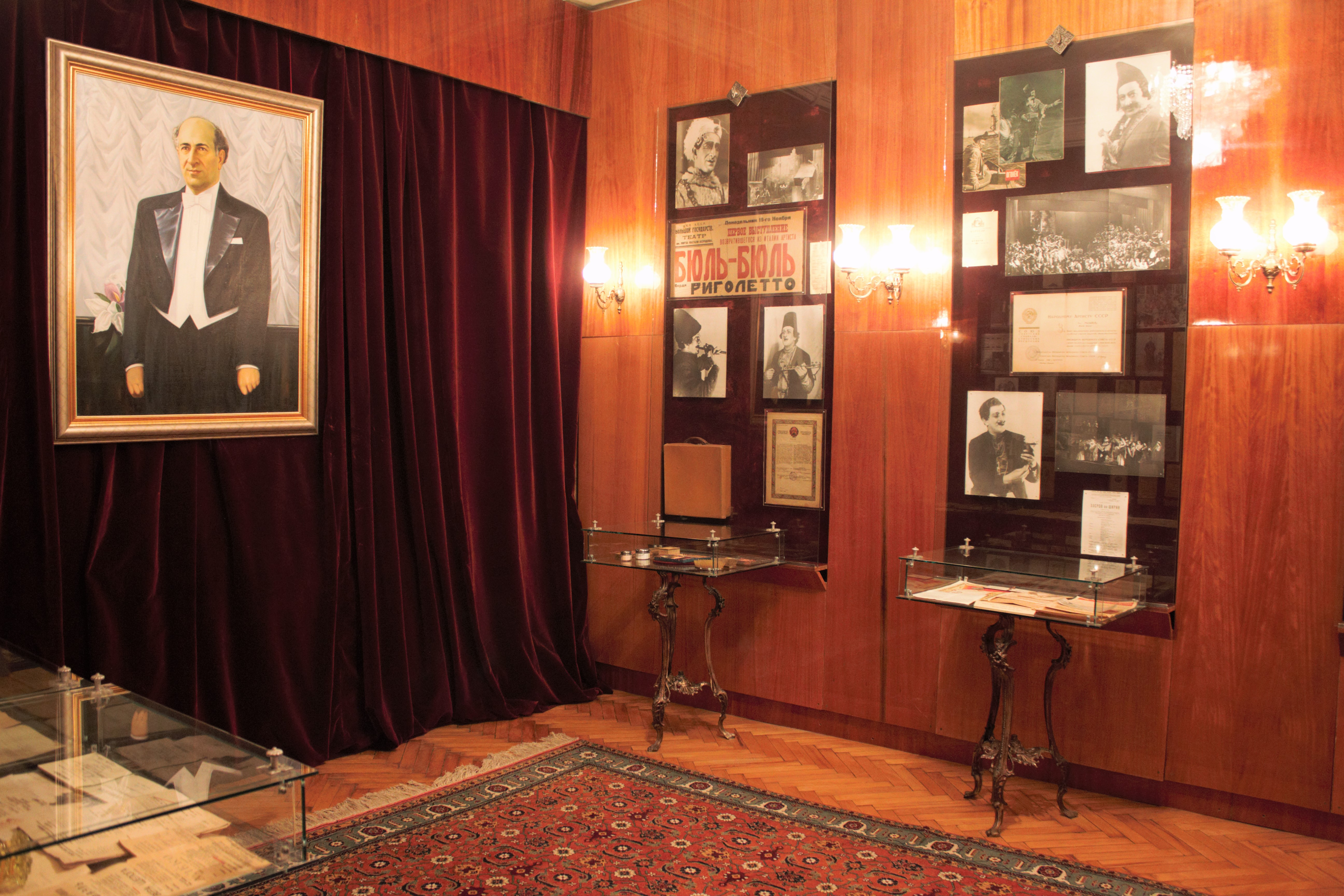
Interior of the Bulbul's Memorial Museum. Exhibition room. The subject of the room is an expression of the creative path of Bulbul from the popular khanende to the master of professional vocal art.

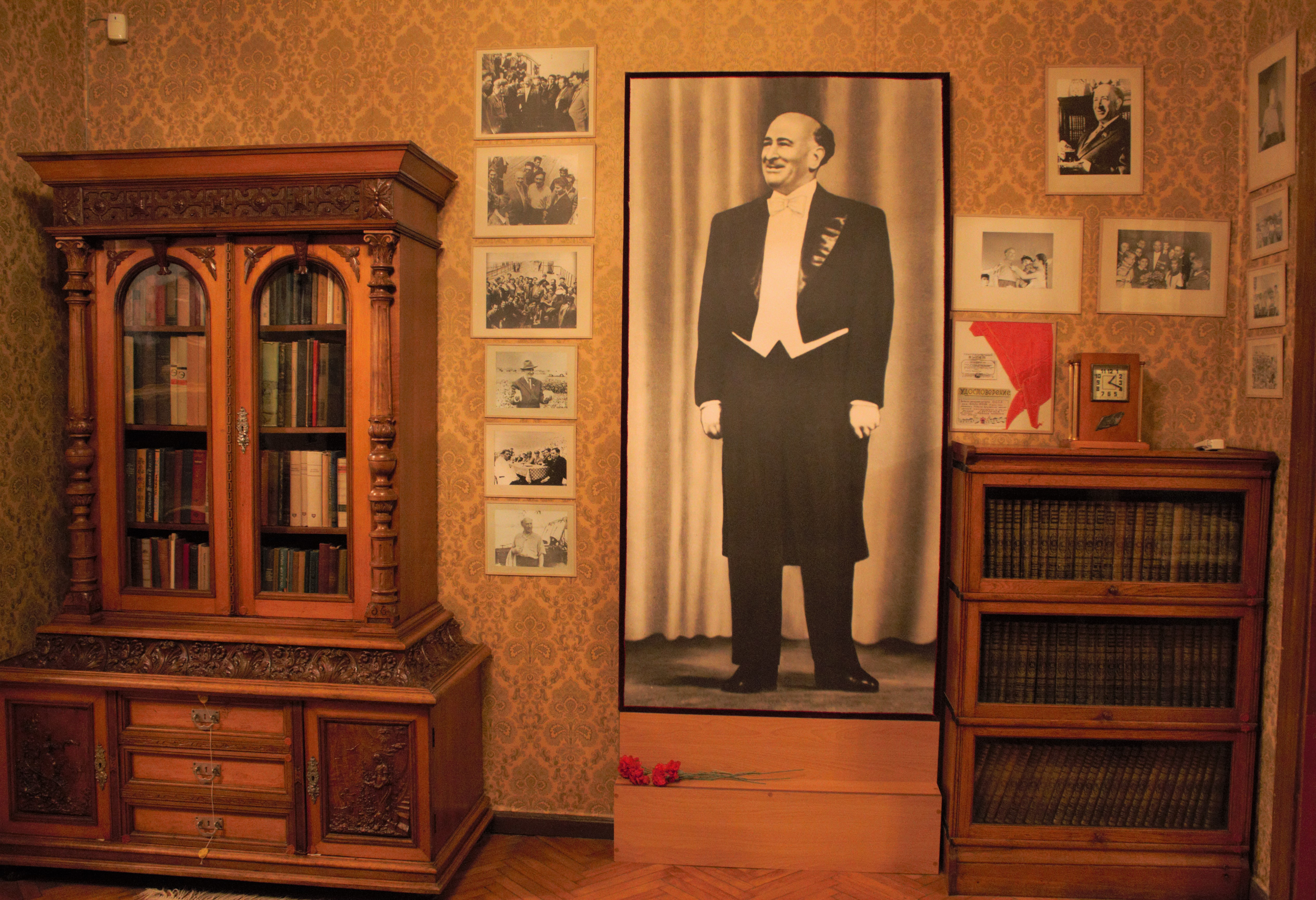
Interior of Bulbul"s cabinet. Personal library of Bulbul. Memorial Museum of Bulbul.

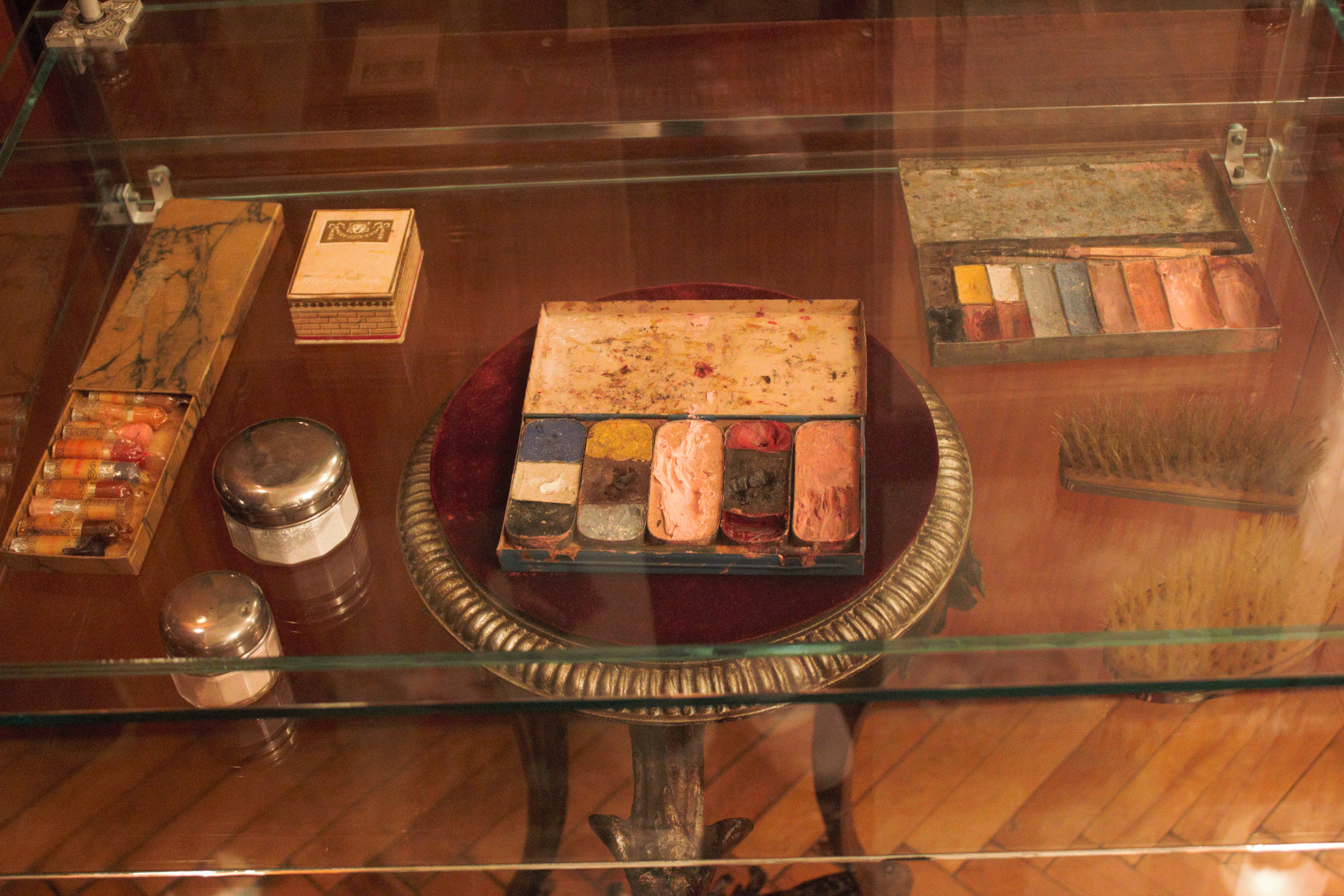
Exhibits of the memorial museum of Bulbul. Accessories for stage makeup.

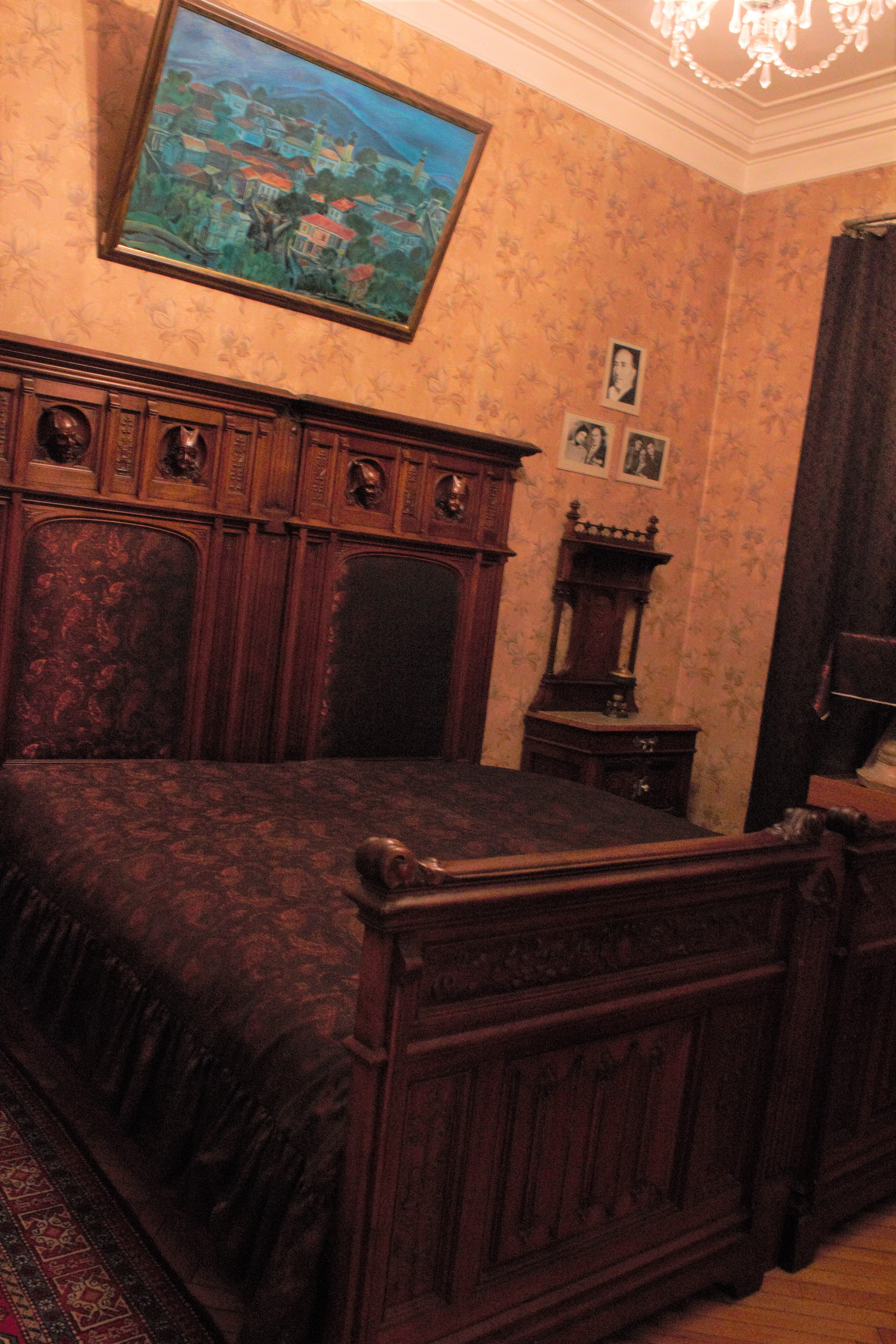
Interior of the bedroom of the Bulbul home-museum. The sleeping room is preserved in the form it was during Bulbul's lifetime.

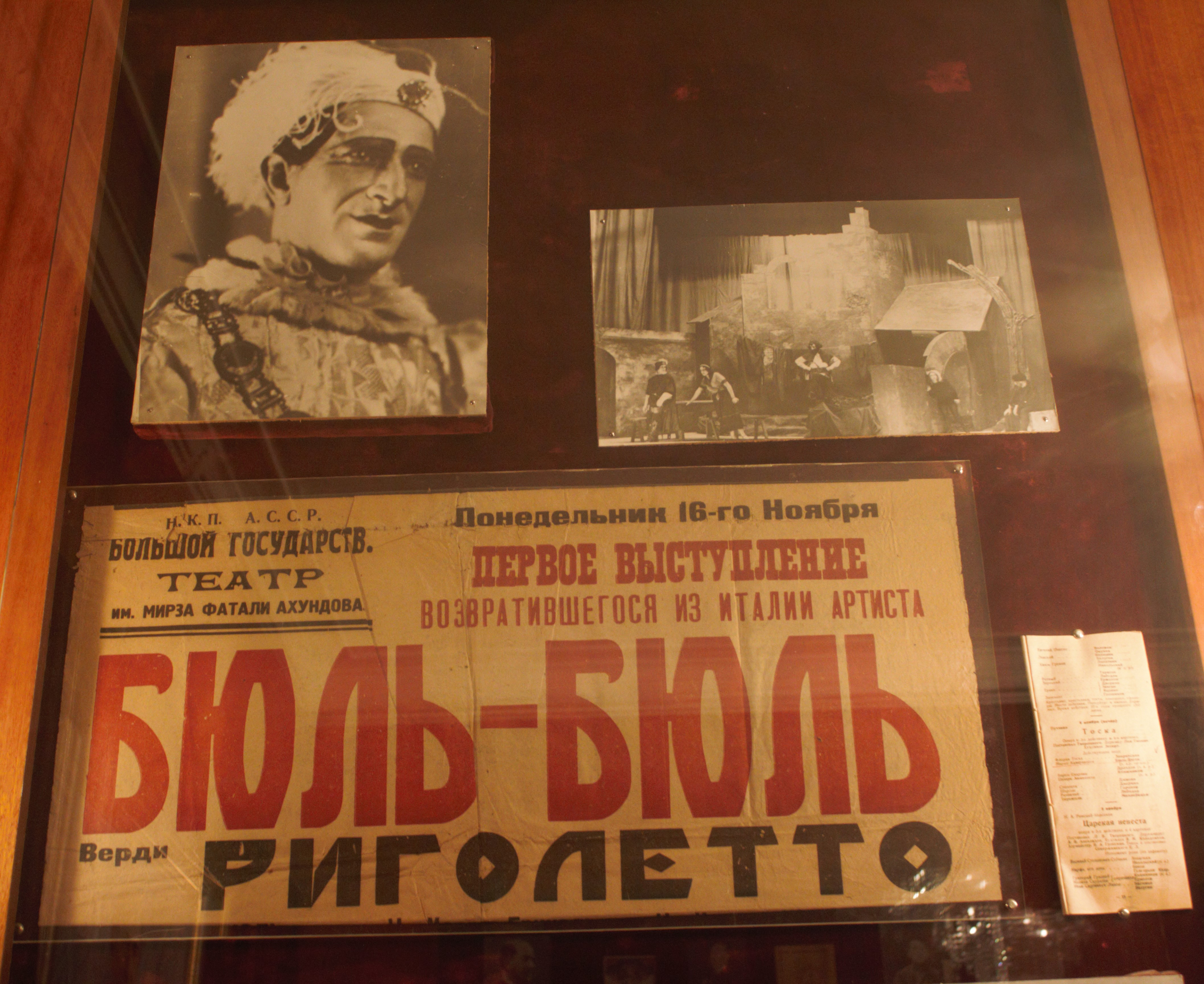
Exhibits of the memorial museum of Bulbul. Bulbul in the role of Duke in the opera Rigoletto. The poster of the opera Rigoletto.
