= Gel Ey Seher =

Single by Polad Bulbuloghlu
- B-side: "Fatih Erkoch"; "Shebnem Ferah"
- Released: 1998 (Turkey)
- Recorded: 1998
- Length: 5:26
- Label: Muzikotek
- Composer(s): Polad Bulbuloghlu
- Lyricist(s): Fikrat Goja
- Producer(s): Okan Tapan

"Gel Ey Seher" is a song composed by Polad Bulbuloghlu, based on a poem by Fikrat Goja. It was especially popular in the late 1960s and early 1970s and helped launch Polad's career as a pop star. Polad Bulbuloghlu, Azerbaijan's former Ministry of Culture, today Azerbaijan`s Ambassador to Russia and was once one of the Soviet Union's most famous pop singers.

In 1998, Paul Buckmaster was commissioned by Turkish record label Muzikotek, on behalf of Okan Tapan, a Turkish businessman who has a special interest in the song Gel Ey Seher, to arrange a new version of the song for Polad Bulbuloghlu. Buckmaster was asked by Muzikotek to suggest an author to write an English adaptation of the lyrics. He suggested Roxanne Seeman, who wrote the English lyrics "Come Back To Me", which appear in the artwork of the CD release. The song was recorded with Seeman's English lyrics but was not included as part of the Turkish CD release. The song with his arrangement this is today still one of the most requested popular songs for the Turkish radio stations after all these years.

The recording of Gel Ey Seher (Come, O Morning) by Polad Bulbuloghlu appears in the Azerbaijanian film The Last Night of Childhood, along with “In My Life” and “Michelle” by The Beatles. Arif Babayev, the director, was so impressed by Bulbuloghlu, also the composer of the film, that he said to him “You see, this song will become one of your most popular songs”.

Bulbuloghlu, as Ambassador of Azerbaijan to Russia and on the occasion of his 75th birthday, organized a concert entitled “Gel Ey Seher” for the soldiers on the Jidir Plain at Shusha.

== Credits ==
- Arranged By – Paul Buckmaster (tracks: A1, B1), Polad Bulbuloghlu (tracks: B2)
- Graphic Design – Erkul Yazgan
- Directed By – Daghan Baydur
- Guitar – Erdem Sokmen
- Lyrics By – Fikrat Goja (Fikret Quacan)
- Mastered By – Oghuz Kaplangi
- Mixed By – Ender Akay
- Music By – Polad Bulbuloghlu
- Ney – Erjan Irmak
- Orchestra – Istanbul Senfonia
- Other [Costume] – Bahar Korchan
- Other [Hair] – Mos- Sedat Kaymaz
- Photography By – Mufit Chirpanli
- Producer – R. Okan Tapan
- Translated By [English Adaptation] – Roxanne Seeman

== Televised performance ==
=== Live performance ===
- Polad Bulbuloghlu (2015)

== Cover versions ==
- The "Voice" from the Azerbaijani television program, Aynishan Guliyeva singing Paul Buckmaster version of "Gel Ey Seher" in 2011.
- The "Voice" from the Turkish television program, Aynishan Guliyeva singing a cover of "Gel Ey Seher" in 2016.
- "Spirit of Caucasus" from the Azerbaijani television program, SEYRAN singing a cover of "Gel Ey Seher" in 2018.

== Track listing ==
#	Title	Performer(s)	Arranger(s)	Length
1	"Gel Ey Seher"	Polad Bulbuloghlu	Paul Buckmaster	5:26
2	"Gel Ey Seher"	Fatih Erkoch	Paul Buckmaster remixed by Iskender Paydas	4:32
3	"Gel Ey Seher"	Polad Bulbuloghlu and Shebnem Ferah	Paul Buckmaster	5:27
4	"Gel Ey Seher"	Polad Bulbuloghlu	Polad Bulbuloghlu	3:44
