= People's Poet of Azerbaijan =

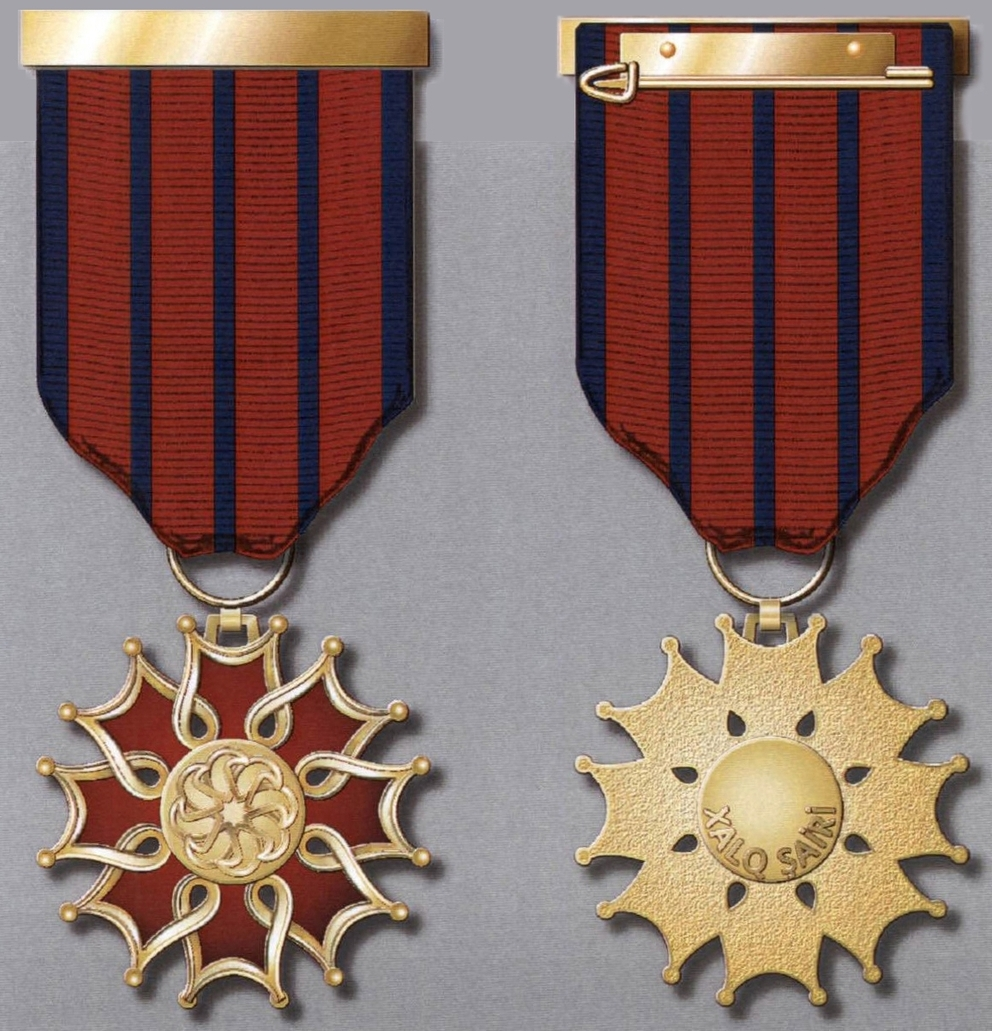
- Country: Azerbaijan

People’s Poet of Azerbaijan (Azerbaijani: Xalq şairi) is the honorary title granted to the prominent poets of Azerbaijan for their contribution to the development of Azerbaijani literature.

== Assignment ==
The honorary title "People's Poet of Azerbaijan" was established by Decree of the President of the Republic of Azerbaijan dated May 22, 1998, along with some other titles.

The President of Azerbaijan confers the honorary title on his initiative, as well as on the proposal of the National Assembly and the Cabinet of Ministers.

The title is awarded only to citizens of Azerbaijan. According to the decree, the honorary title of "People's Poet of Azerbaijan" cannot be awarded to the same person repeatedly.

A person awarded an honorary title may be deprived of the title in the cases of misconduct.

Persons awarded the honorary title "People's Poet of Azerbaijan" also receive a certificate and a badge of the honorary title of the Republic of Azerbaijan. The badge of honor is worn on the right side of the chest.

== People's Poets of Azerbaijan ==
- Bakhtiyar Vahabzadeh
- Zelimkhan Yagub
- Nariman Hasanzadeh
- Sohrab Tahiri
- Mamed Araz
- Khalil Rza Uluturk
- Akim of Billuri
- Fikrat Goja
- Vagif Samedoglu
- Jabir Novruz
- Samad Vurgun
- Sabir Rustamkhanli
- Gabil Imamverdiyev

== See also ==
People’s Writer of Azerbaijan
