= Mil plain =

Plain in Azerbaijan

Coordinates: 39.8666°N 47.75°E

Mil plain is a plain in Azerbaijan located on the bank of the Aras river and extending to Iran. Mil plain is located in the southwestern part of the Kur-Araz lowland, where the Kura and Araz rivers meet. The area is between the right bank of the Kura River and the left bank of the Araz River. The north-eastern part of the plain is lower than the ocean level. In the south-west, these areas are covered by sand and gravel. More than 40 percent of the altitude in the plain is 0–100 meters, 25 percent - 100–200 meters above sea level, and 35 percent - absolute altitude is less than 0 meters. The absolute altitude decreases about 8 m to north (to the Kura River) and varies from 200 to 250 to the west (harami plain). The plain includes mainly the areas of Imishli and Beylagan districts. Seismic activity is high as the plain is in the convergent border the Alpine-Himalayan orogenic belt.

== Landscape ==
The territory belongs to the semi-desert landscape and spreads horizontally. Gray, gray-meadow, gray-brown and saline soils and contain less humus. Due to high salinization process 30-40% of semi-deserts is covered by plants. Wormwood, gavan, kangiz, camel thorn, saline plants constitute the majority of the vegetation. In addition, Intra-zonal landscape (created by underground water) is also characteristic for the plain. Tugay forest was formed due to this reason along the Kura River. Modern-anthropogenic landscape formation replaced the original landscape as a result of human activities (more than 60%). Therefore, many specific vegetation has become extinct where anthropogenic and natural-anthropogenic landscapes mostly replaced it.

== Climate ==
Climate semi-desert and dry steppe is specific for the Mil plain. It has very dry and hot summer and relatively wetter winter. It rains only during colder months and agriculture without irrigation is impossible. Months of July and August is considered as hottest months, January the coldest month. The average annual temperature is about 14.0 C. The average temperature of January is 1.8 C, and July is 26.0 C. In summer, the absolute maximum air temperature is 10 C, and varies from -8 C to 15 C during the year. Yearly average solar radiation is 130.7 9 cm kcal / cm2 and the radiation balance is 45.0 kcal / cm2. The total annual temperature is above 49160 C, 100. The maximum annual temperature is 44380 C. The cold air masses reaches the plain in the autumn after November 20. Average relative humidity of the air varies between 58-82%.The annual amount of precipitation is 312 and evaporation is 1000 mm. Most of the oils are in the cold season, mainly in the spring and autumn becomes. The humidity ratio is around 0.3 and. The prevailing winds blow from the east southeast, with average annual speed not exceeding 2.2 m / sec. Strong winds with the speed of 15m / sec continues only 10 days during a year. 300mm rainfall falls during the year.

== Orography and relief ==
The surface of the Mil plain is very similar to the other plains the Kura-Araz lowland. However, the area consists of different structural landforms. The complexity of the micro relief of the area led in the creation of compound and diverse natural complexes in the plain, which is less than the sea level. The complexity of micro relief of the plain is due to its geological. The rivers of the past and modern times has led to formation diverse relief forms such as dry valleys, lakes and ponds, etc. Depending on the diversity in relief, the Mil plain could be divided into three parts: 1) Lowland that is (composed of lakes and marshes) area below the sea level, 2) Plains that 0 and 200 meters, 3) foothills in the 200–450 meters. The lowland extends from the 0-horizontal to the east along Kur and Araz rivers. The complexity of micro relief forms differs in this area. Sarısu lake (created by the Kura River) is located here.

== Hydrography ==
Hydrography of the Mil Plain includes the two rivers, the Kura and Araz, groundwater and several lakes in the plain. Aggol, Sarisu, and some other small lakes created by mainly Kura River. The largest of these lakes is Aggol and Sarısu lakes system. These lakes are linked by Bozgobu and Sherbet qobu. The lakes are located around the riverbed of the Kura. The lakes are surrounded by marshlands which is covered by mainly canes. The main reason for this is that the lakes are lower than the level of water in Kur and Araz rivers and the ground water around the Aghgol, Shorgol and Sarısu lakes are very closer to the surface. The Kur River constitute the north and Araz River south borders of Mil plain.

== See also ==
- Arran
