= Upa, Azerbaijan =

Upa
- Location within Azerbaijan
- Coordinates: 40°50′N 49°15′E
- Country: Azerbaijan
- Rayon: Khizi
- Time zone: UTC+4 (AZT)
  - Summer (DST): UTC+5 (AZT)

Upa is a village in the Khizi Rayon of Azerbaijan.
