= Bulbul (singer) =

Bulbul Bülbül
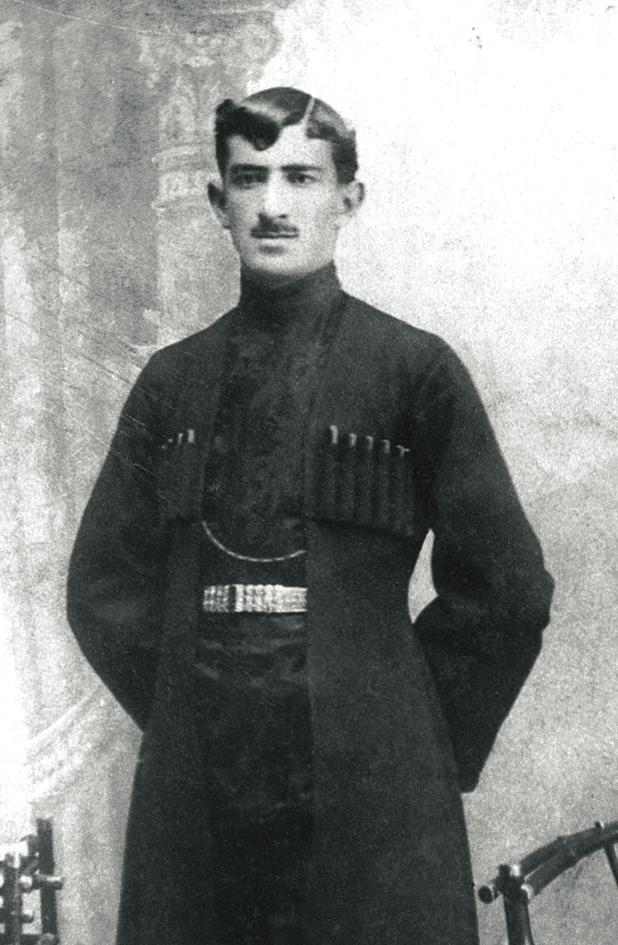

Background information
- Born: Murtuza Mashadi Rza oghlu Mammadov; 22 June 1897; Khanbaghi, Caucasus Viceroyalty, Russian Empire (present-day Azerbaijan)
- Died: 26 September 1961 (aged 64) Baku, Azerbaijan SSR, Soviet Union
- Genres: Classical, folk
- Occupation: Singer
- Instrument: Singing
- Years active: 1916–1961

Bulbul (Note: Azerbaijani: Bülbül; Russian: Бюль-Бюль, romanized: Byul-Byul) (22 June 1897 – 26 September 1961, born Murtuza Mashadi Rza oghlu Mammadov) (Note: Azerbaijani: Murtuza Məşədi Rza oğlu Məmmədov; Russian: Муртуза Мешади Рза оглы Мамедов, romanized: Murtuza Meshadi Rza ogly Mamedov) was an Azerbaijani and Soviet operatic tenor, folk music performer, and one of the founders of vocal arts and national musical theatre in Azerbaijan.

== Biography ==
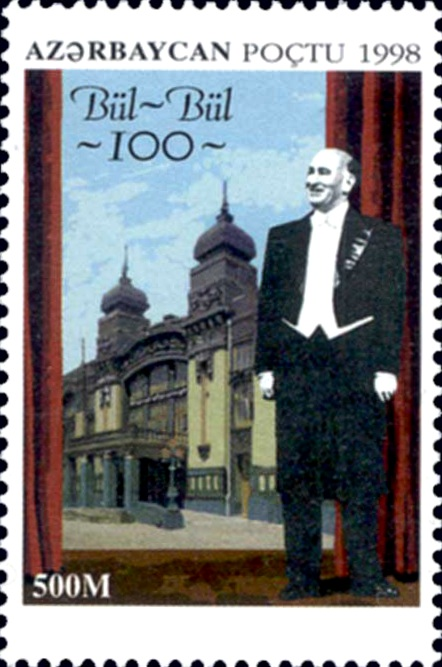
Bulbul pictured on Azerbaijani stamp

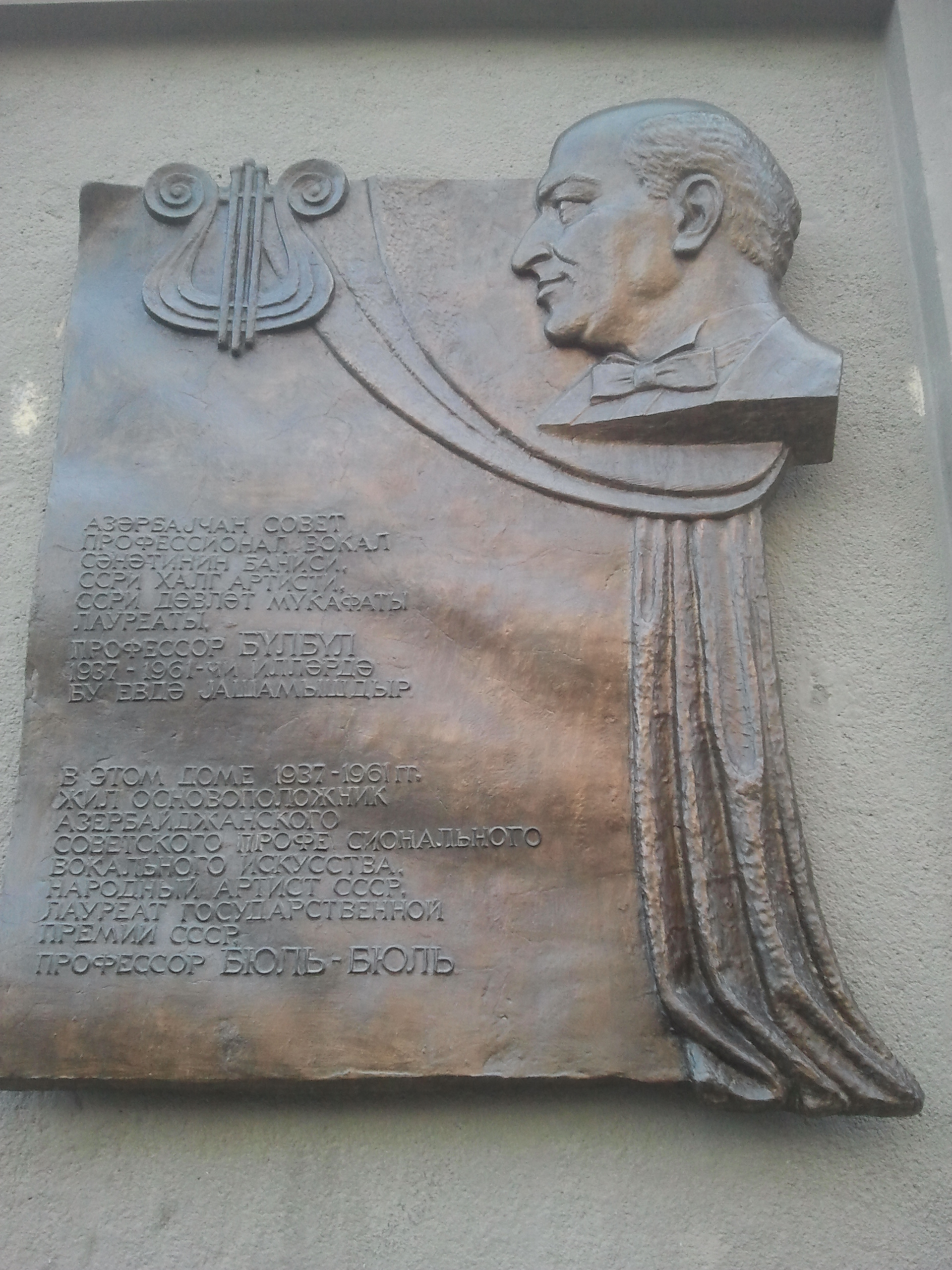
Plaque on the building where Azerbaijani singer, opera tenor and professor Bulbul (Murtuza Mammadov) lived in Baku

Bulbul was born in 1897 in Khanbaghi, a hamlet in the former royal gardens between Shusha and Khankandi. His mother was from the village of Pareular, the daughter of a nomad Kurd. He was known for his musical talent since his childhood, which is why people nicknamed him Bulbul ("nightingale" in Persian). He chose it as a stage name when he became involved in professional music. While still a young khananda, he was invited to Baku in 1920 to perform the role of Karam in Uzeyir Hajibeyov's opera Asli and Karam. There he became acquainted with European-style opera and decided to excel in this genre. He later studied music and vocal arts at Azerbaijan State Conservatoire (now known as the Baku Academy of Music), where he was admitted in 1921, as well as in the La Scala Theatre in Milan, Italy.

In his songs, Bulbul was able to blend national manners of performance with traditions of Italian vocal school. He was also first to play the lead role of Koroglu in Uzeyir Hajibeyov's opera of the same name in 1938. Throughout his life, Bulbul was the vocal performer and the co-author of a number of songs and romances.

Bulbul was also known for his music-related publications and teaching vocal arts at his alma mater, the Azerbaijan State Conservatoire between 1932 and 1961. He acquired a PhD degree in music in 1940. His monographs nowadays serve as an important source for those studying Azerbaijani music. Bulbul was the first musician in Azerbaijan to publish study guides and manuals used in teaching students how to play the tar, kamancheh and balaban.

Bulbul was awarded the highest artistic order of the Soviet Union – People's Artist of the USSR, as well as the "Stella di Garibaldi" order in Italy. He died in Baku.

His second son Polad Mammadov also known as Polad Bülbüloğlu, was from his second marriage to Adelaida Mammadova, also an accomplished singer and actress. Polad is currently the Member of National Assembly.

== Commemoration ==
Monument to Bulbul in Baku

Bulbul was buried at the Alley of Honor in Baku.

The Ministry of Culture of Azerbaijan purchased the bronze busts of Bulbul and several other famous Karabakh Azerbaijanis that had once been erected in Shusha, on the black market in Georgia. Following the Armenian occupation of Shusha in 1992, these monuments were machine-gunned, removed from their original place and intended to be sold as scrap metal. Nowadays these monuments are preserved in the courtyard of the Azerbaijani Museum of Arts in Baku.

In 2008 the Central Bank of Azerbaijan minted a 100-manat gold commemorative coin dedicated to Bulbul.

== Monument to Bulbul ==
On 31 October 2012, the Monument to Bulbul containing a statue of the singer was unveiled on Bulbul Street in Baku, not far from the house where the singer lived. The monument was created by sculptor Akif Asgarov.

The monument's unveiling was attended by President of Azerbaijan Ilham Aliyev, the principal of the Baku Music Academy, People's Artist Farhad Badalbeyli, People's Artist Arif Babayev, chair of the jury of the 4th Bulbul International Contest of Vocalists Sergei Leiferkus, artistic director of the contest Robert Koerner, and the singer's son, Polad Bülbüloğlu.

== Awards and decorations ==
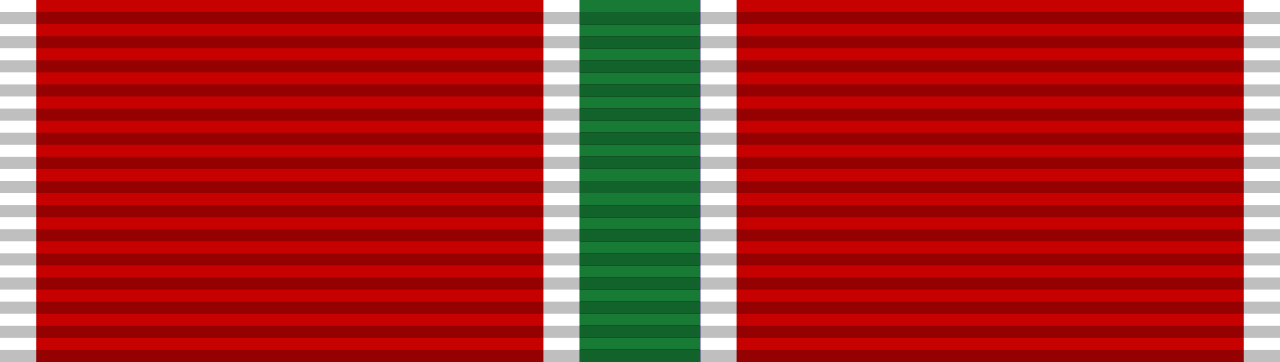
| People's Artist of the USSR (1938) |
| Stalin Prize (1950) |
| Order of Lenin (1946, 1956) |
| Order of the Red Banner of Labour (1936, 1958) |
| Order of the Badge of Honour (1938) |
| Garibaldi Partisan Star (Italy) |

- Honorary citizen of Sumgait
- Honorary artist of Azerbaijan (1935)

== See also ==
- House-Museum of Bulbul (Baku)
- House-Museum of Bulbul (Shusha)
