= House-Museum of Bulbul (Shusha) =

- Bülbülün ev-muzeyi
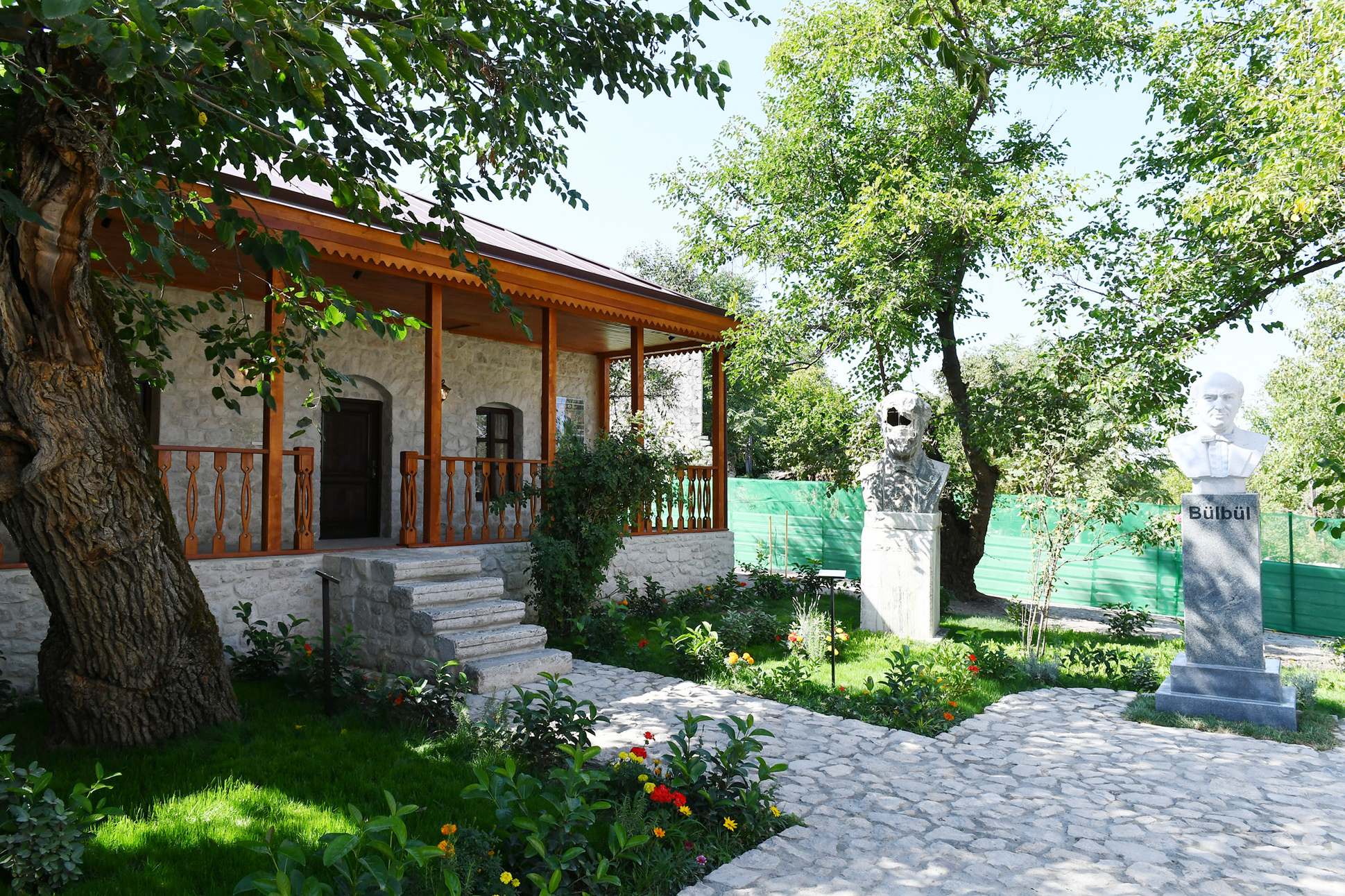
- Recently restored house-museum
- Dissolved: 1992
- Location: Shusha, Azerbaijan
- Coordinates: 39°45′42″N 46°45′29″E
- Type: house-museum

The House-Museum of Bulbul was the Shusha branch of the Bulbul memorial museum in Baku, Azerbaijan, until 1992. It was previously in a ruined status but has been recently restored.

== About ==
The house consisted of two rooms and a balcony. Here the pictures of Bulbul's childhood were stored. Some of his personal things, including his dayereh, were displayed in the museum. On the wall Bulbul's concert posters from 1925 to 1926 were hanging. The exposition had reflected Bulbul's activities in Azerbaijan in the 20s in Ganja and his active participation in the music industry in Azerbaijan during the cultural revolution. Photographs of documents about Bulbul's activities in the Komsomol and Trade Union, his performance in Baku, documents and materials about his education in Azerbaijan State Conservatoire and in Italy, large portrait of Bulbul in Italian magazine "Arte Nostra" and articles about him, photos with friends and family were displayed on the showcase. In addition to the photos, there were manuscripts, published articles and reports of Bulbul.

In the second room, Bulbul's pictures with his family, friends and colleagues were exhibited. Posters of opera performances by Bulbul, pictures of premieres and anniversary performances, lectures, collections and textbooks published by its participation and editing, originals and photographs of official letters were shown here. Unique and valuable documents about Bulbul's creativity, scientific research, pedagogical and public activities were also available. The second room showcases materials that confirm the long-term creative work of Bulbul in creating a new vocal school in Azerbaijan, as well as in the study and promotion of folk music.

Among the memorial boards on the facade of the museum was a bronze portrait of Bulbul's childhood by sculptor Khanlar Ahmadov. The museum collected about 9,000 documents reflecting Bulbul's creative, scientific, pedagogical and public activities.

== History ==
The museum was closed following the capture of Shusha by Armenian forces in 1992. It has since been vandalized and the bust of Bulbul in front of the museum has been destroyed.

== Gallery ==
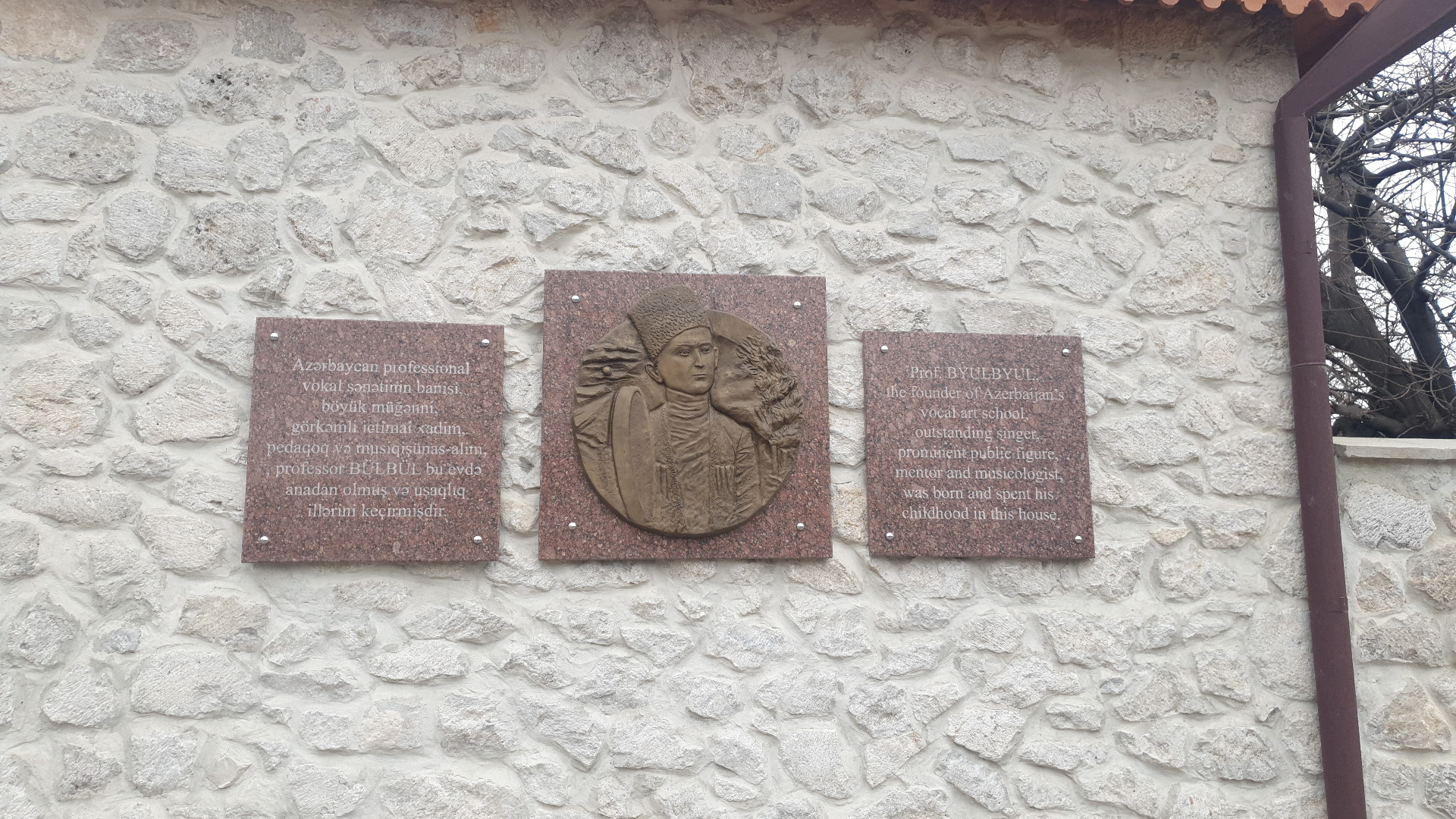

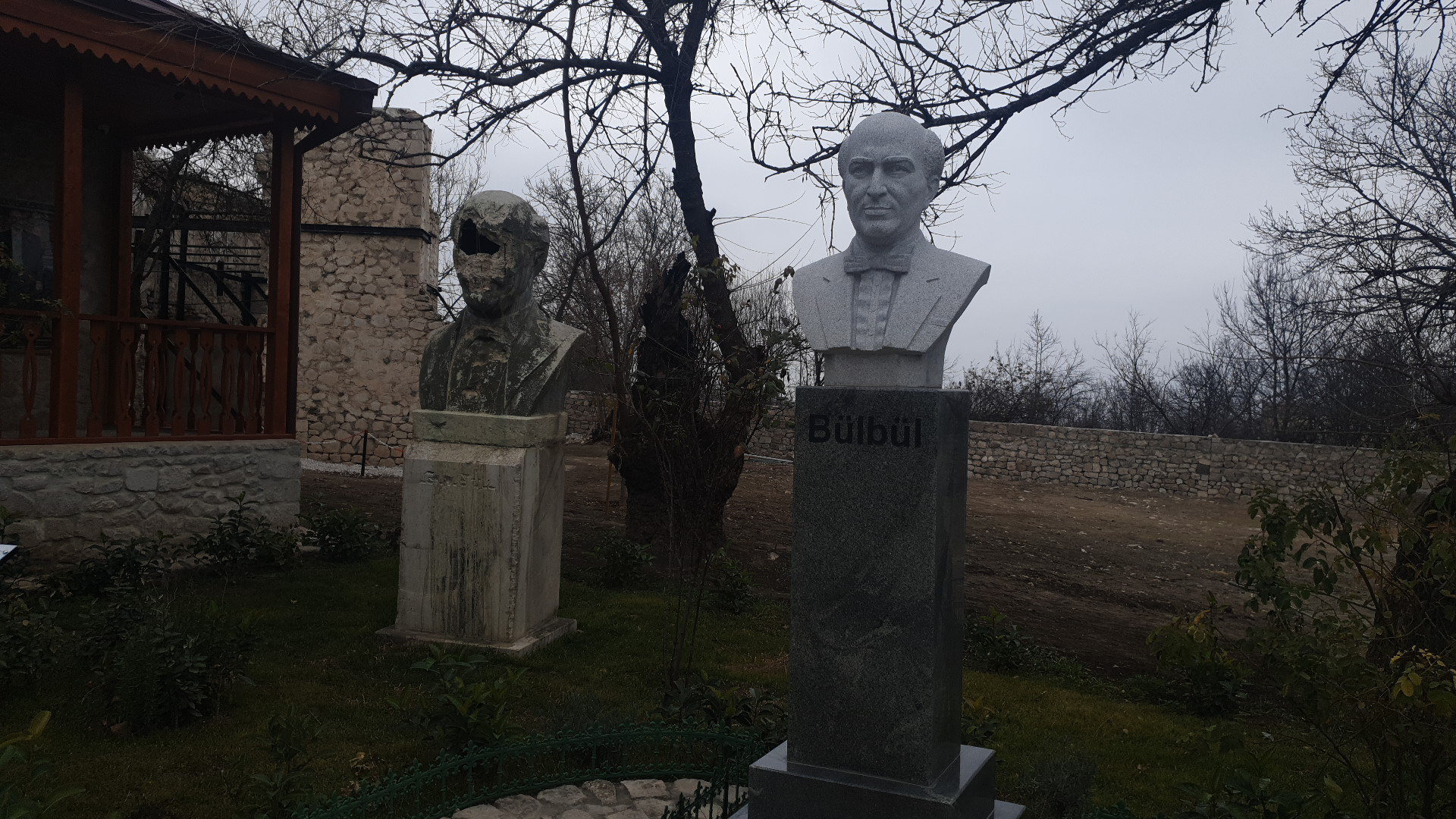

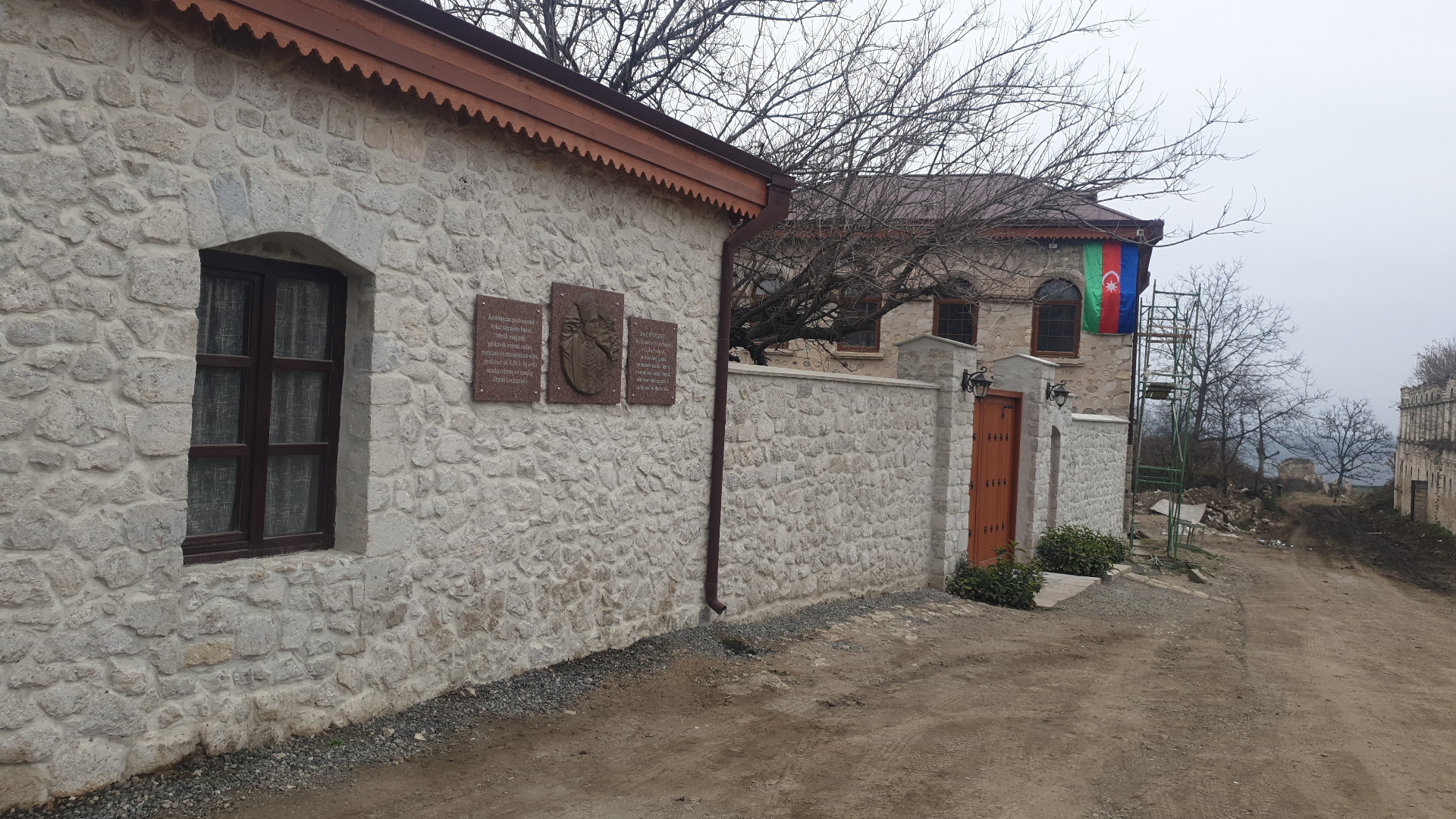
