= Polad Bülbüloğlu =

Soviet-Azerbaijani singer (born 1945)

Polad Bulbuloghlu
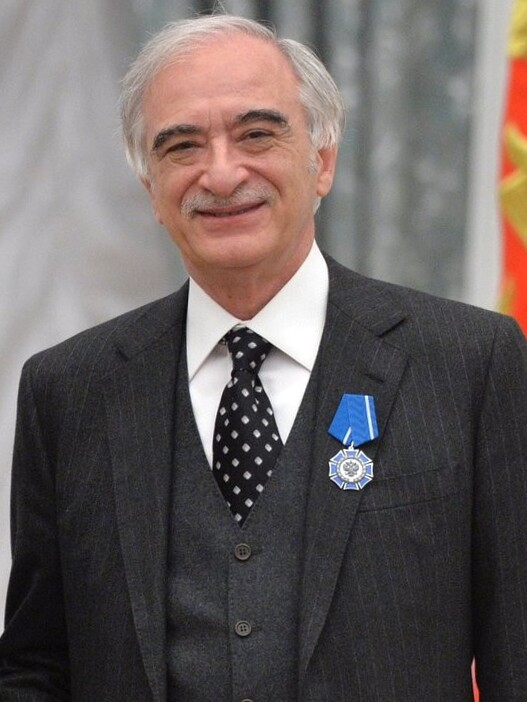
- On the ceremony of rewarding the order of Honour. (2015)

Background information
- Born: Polad Mammadov; February 4, 1945 (age 81)
- Origin: Baku, Azerbaijan SSR, USSR
- Genres: Pop, folk
- Occupations: Singer, composer, actor
- Years active: 1968–present
- Spouse: Bela Rudenko
- Awards

Member of the National Assembly
- Incumbent
- Assumed office September 2024
- President: Ilham Aliyev

Ambassador of Azerbaijan to Russia
- In office 13 April 2006 – September 2024
- President: Ilham Aliyev
- Preceded by: Ramiz Rizaev
- Succeeded by: Rahman Mustafayev

Minister of Culture
- In office 1988–2006
- President: Heydar Aliyev; Ilham Aliyev
- Succeeded by: Abulfas Garayev

Polad Bulbuloghlu (Azerbaijani: Polad Bülbüloğlu; born February 4, 1945) is a Soviet and Azerbaijani singer, actor, politician, and diplomat. Bulbuloghlu became famous in the Soviet Union with composing jazz-influenced songs with heavy Azerbaijani folk influences in Azerbaijani and Russian languages. He also sang his own songs. Three of his songs became Songs of the Year and he received numerous prestigious awards in the Soviet Union. Bulbuloghlu is a lyrical tenor.

In the late 1990s, despite having a huge success with a new version arranged by Paul Buckmaster of his old song Gəl Ey Səhər (Come, Hey Morning!) in Turkey and sold-out concerts in Russia, Bulbuloghlu started a political career. He became the Minister of Culture of Azerbaijan, the Azerbaijani ambassador to Russia and member of the Parliament of Azerbaijan.

In 2017, he was a candidate for the post of Director-General of UNESCO. He withdrew his candidacy on October 10 after getting only 2 votes in the first round of the election.

== Biography ==
Bulbuloghlu was born Polad Murtuza oghlu Mammadov on February 4, 1945, in Baku, Azerbaijan SSR. His father was Murtuza Rza oglu Mammadov (1897–1961), better known by sobriquet Bulbul (lit. "nightingale"), a famous Azerbaijani opera singer and a native of Shusha, who exposed Polad to musical culture from an early age. His Batumi-born mother Adelaida Mammadova (née Gasimova, 1922–2015), who was the director of the Bulbul Museum until her death, was the daughter of Rza Gasimov, son of an Azerbaijani merchant from Yerevan, and his wife Ketevan who belonged to the Georgian noble Vezirishvili family. Polad studied the piano in a music school and then studied composing in the Baku Academy of Music, under Gara Garayev. By the age of 17 he composed several songs that were performed by professionals, as well as songs for his friend Muslim Magomayev. Bülbüloğlu's singing talent was also discovered on a trip to Moscow with Magomayev, where Bulbuloghlu recorded his own songs in the Azerbaijani language.

In his career, Bulbuloghlu combined modern music style with national Azerbaijani music to create a new musical stream in the Soviet Union. He toured the entire USSR and performed around the world. In 1982, Bülbüloğlu became a National Artist of the Azerbaijan SSR. He participated in the Soviet television program and festival Song of the Year and won the first prize on four occasions. His songs were performed, among others, by Muslim Magomayev, Joseph Kobzon and Lev Leshchenko.

In 1969, Bulbuloghlu became a member of the USSR Union of Composers and the USSR Union of Cinematographers. He composed music for over twenty feature films and had leading roles in several. Among others, he worked with the Russian director Eduard Smolny. Bulbuloghlu has a star at the Moscow Performers' Square, inaugurated in 2000. He received a doctorate of the History of Art from the Azerbaijan National Academy of Culture and holds an honorary professorship in the Azerbaijan State University of Culture and Arts.

Polad's son, Teimur Polad oghlu Bulbul, born in 1975, is a musician in the Tchaikovsky Symphony Orchestra of Moscow Radio and a Meritorious Artist of the Russian Federation.

== Public career ==
Bulbuloghlu managed the Stage Ensemble of the Azerbaijan SSR (from 1976) and the Azerbaijan National Philharmonic Orchestra for several years (from 1987), and in 1988 became the Culture Minister of the Azerbaijan SSR. In 1995, he joined the National Assembly of Azerbaijan. In 2006, Polad left the post of Minister of Culture and moved to Moscow, where he was appointed Ambassador of the Republic of Azerbaijan to the Russian Federation. In 2017 Polad Bülbüloğlu ran for head of UNESCO, but dropped out of the race.

On August 18, 2024, Polad Bulbuloglu announced that he was leaving the post of Azerbaijani Ambassador to Russia. The artist and politician was elected member of the parliament, representing the cities of Aghdam, Khojavend and Shusha (Nagorno-Karabakh region), where he spent his childhood.

== Awards ==
- Kazakhstan – National Award of Peace and Progress (2010) – for special contribution to peace and friendship and resolution of cultural problems in the Turkish-speaking world
- International Order of the Patrons of the Century (2006) – for extraordinary achievements in diplomacy
- Russia – Order of Friendship (2005) – for development of cultural ties between Russia and Azerbaijan
- Azerbaijan – Order of Independence (2005) – for development of Azeri culture
- Georgia – Order of Honour (2002)
- Song of the Year (1980 – Tell Your Eyes, 1979 – Beloved Country, 1978 – I am in Love, 1977 – Will Be Delighted by the Sun Again)
- Azerbaijan – For service to the Fatherland Order (2nd class)
- Azerbaijan – Heydar Aliyev Order (2020)

=== Titles ===
- People's Artist of Turkmenistan (2017)
- Om emerit al Republicii Moldova (2005)
- People's Artist of the Azerbaijan SSR

== Filmography ==
Year	Title	Russian title	Role
2013	Don't Be Afraid, I Am Here For You 1919	Не бойся, я с тобой 1919	Teymur
2006	Park of a Soviet Era	Парк советского периода	cameo
1981	Don't Be Afraid, I Am Here For You	Не бойся, я с тобой	Teymur
1973	On the Wings of Song	На крыльях песни	singer
1970	Rhythms of Apsheron	Ритмы Апшерона	cameo
1970	"Margaret" Storms	Бушует "Маргарита»	singer
1966	Tales of the Russian Forest	Сказки русского леса	singer
1954	To the Beloved Nation	Родному народу	cameo
Source: kino-teatr.ru (in Russian)

== Songs ==
- Şən Azərbaycan (1970)
- Gəl Ey Səhər (Come, Hey Morning!)
