= The State Theater of the Azerbaijan Democratic Republic =

Theatre in Azerbaijan

The State Theater of the Azerbaijan Democratic Republic is one of the first Azerbaijani professional theaters that was given the status of the State Theater during the existence of the ADR. Thus, the National Theatre, founded in 1873, was re-established.

== History ==
The theatre's first performance was the tragedy "Nader Shah" on November 4, 1918 (written by Nariman Narimanov).

According to a Decree of the Government of the ADR dated October 9, 1918, the management of the theatre was transferred to the Ministry of Education. On October 18, 1918, having heard the report of the Minister of Public Education on the organization of the Azerbaijan State Theater, the members of the government decided to purchase the building of the Mailov Brothers Theater (currently, the Azerbaijan State Academic Opera and Ballet Theater).

On August 22, 1919, at a joint meeting of the Board of "Union of Turkish Actors" and the directorate of the "Hajibeyli Brothers", it was decided to establish "Baku courses", consisting of four departments, with the aim of improving both dramatic and musical works and training qualified personnel. Abbas Mirza Sharifzadeh and Huseyngulu Sarabsky were approved for the drama department, Mirzagha Aliyev for the comedy department, brothers Zulfugar and Uzeyir Hajibeyli, Muslim Magomayev and Gurban Pirimov for the music department, and Aliabbas Muznib and Rza Zaki Efendi for the literature department.

== Nationalization of the theater ==
At a meeting on November 17, 1919, the Council of Ministers approved a bill on the establishment of the State Turkish Opera and Drama Theater and allocated funds in the amount of 300 thousand 605 manats for this. The Azerbaijani theater, therefore, was nationalized and placed under the auspices of the state.

The Ministry of Public Education, in turn, submitted a report to the Parliament on the abolition of taxes on theater groups and other cultural institutions. As a result, state taxes were halved.

== New theater groups ==
The first theater group in Baku was the Hajibeyli Brothers. The group consisted of prominent artists: Hajiagha Abbasov, Mirzagha Aliyev, Ahmed Aghdam, Jalil Bagdadbekov, Huseyn Arablinsky, Huseyngulu Sarabsky, Mukhtar Mukhammadzadeh, Rza Darably, Sidgi Ruhulla, Alekper Huseynzadeh, Mammadtagi Bagirzadeh, Bagir Jabbarzadeh, Abulhasan Anaply, Ahmed Anatollu, Mir Mahmud Kazimovsky, Evgenia Olenskaya, etc. The group staged such performances as "The Destroyed Tifag", "Agha Mohammed Shah Qajar" by Abdurrahim Bey Hagverdiyev, "Gaweyi-ahanger" by Shamsaddin Sami, "Azerbaijan" by Isa Bey Ashurbeyli, "Arshin mal alan", "Meshadi Ibad", "Leyli and Majnun", "Asli and Kerem", "Shah Abbas and Khurshid Banu" by Uzeyir bey Hajibeyli, "Ashug Gharib" by Zulfugar Hajibeyli, operetta "Shah Ismail" by Muslim Magomayev.

Theater groups were also organized in other cities and counties of Azerbaijan. A branch of the theater department of the Hajibeyli brothers was established in Shusha. The State Theater also operated in Nakhichevan.

The performances of the "Hajibeyli Brothers" groups were staged in such cities as Rasht, Tabriz, Enzeli, Tiflis, etc.

In 1918–1920, along with musical theater performances, folk music concerts, important state events were also held on the stage of the State Theater.

With the annexation of the territory of Azerbaijan to Soviet Russia in April 1920, this theater functioned as the State Theater of Soviet Azerbaijan and was used for many years to hold events of socio-political and state significance.

== See also ==
Azerbaijan State Academic National Drama Theatre
