= Hanafi Teregulov =

Azerbaijani opera singer

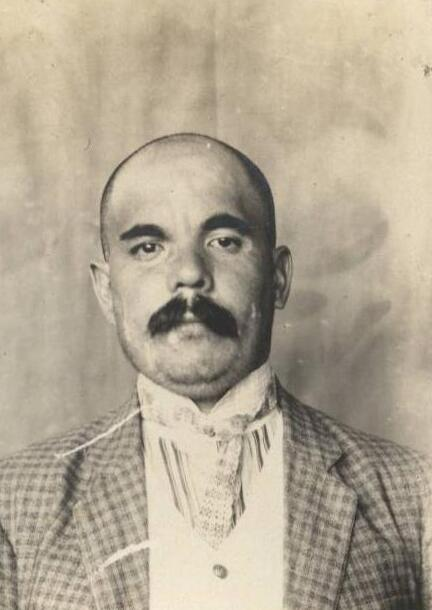
- Hanafi Teregulov in 1909
- Born: Muhammed Hanafi Hasan oglu Teregulov; November 19, 1877; Tiflis, Tiflis Governorate, Russian Empire
- Died: December 18, 1942 (aged 65); Baku, Azerbaijan SSR, USSR
- Occupations: opera singer, choirmaster, teacher, revolutionary
- Father: Hasan Teregulov

Hanafi Teregulov or Muhammed Hanafi Teregulov (19 November 1877, Tiflis, Russian Empire - 18 December 1942, Baku, USSR) was an Azerbaijani (Tatar origin) opera singer, choirmaster, teacher, revolutionary.

== Life ==
Born on 19 November [O.S. 7 November], 1877, in Tiflis in the family of an impoverished honorary citizen of Tiflis Hasan Safarovich Teregulov and Rabiyya khanum Akmayeva. He studied in the Transcaucasian Teachers Seminary. At the seminary, he and his brother Ali Teregulov became friends with Uzeyir Hajibeyov (1885-1948) and Muslim Magomayev (future Azerbaijani composers). Uzeyir and Muslim married their sisters (Maleyka and Badiguljamal). Tsarism tried in every possible way to instill in the students of the seminary the spirit of loyalty, but nevertheless, among certain circles of seminarians, a revolutionary mood and interest in the ideas of Marxism began to appear. Among this group were the Teregulov brothers. After graduating from the seminary, Teregulov taught in the village of Ashtarak in the former Erivan Governorate. At the beginning of the 20th century, Teregulov moved to Baku, where he put a lot of effort into opening Russian-Tatar schools. It is with the city of Baku that many years of its multifaceted socio-political and artistic activities are connected. Even when he was a student of the Transcaucasian Teacher's Seminary, together with Hajibeyov, Magomayev, brother Ali and others, he performed in student performances. After graduating from the seminary, he participated in amateur performances of the Caspian-Black Sea Society for the children of workers as a choirmaster, director and actor. In 1902, at the suggestion of Russian artists, he joined the amateur troupe "Working theater of railway workers" at the Baku railway depot. This troupe gained wide popularity among the Baku proletariat, as it actively preached the advanced ideas of its time, promoted the works of Russian classics. Here he played many roles in the dramatic works of Gogol, Ostrovsky, Gorky. The Workers' Theater of the Railway Workers was in those years a kind of secret apartment for the revolutionaries. It is here that the young teacher and artist gets his revolutionary hardening. In December 1905, an organization of students - Azerbaijanis called Uhuvvet (Brotherhood) was created, in which the hummetists M. Azizbekov, Kh. Teregulov, M. B. Akhundov and others conducted social democratic agitation. Fulfilling the orders of the party, he often travels to Tiflis, Grozny, Vladikavkaz and Rostov, where he conducts underground propaganda work, distributes literature banned by the authorities, in particular the Iskra newspaper. During the period of Hajibeyov's studies at the St. Petersburg Conservatory, Mammad Hanafi Teregulov, together with Abdul-Muslim Magomayev and Huseyngulu Sarabski, was at the head of the young Azerbaijani opera. Following the advice and instructions of Uzeyir Hajibeyov from Saint Petersburg, young leaders strengthened their theater, persistently raised the level of its performing culture.

== Creativity ==
The former teacher of the so-called "Russian-Tatar" school and teaching singing among other academic disciplines, together with Abdul-Muslim Magomayev put a lot of effort into organizing the Azerbaijani opera choir. They attracted musically gifted students from various educational institutions to participate in it. Soon after the creation of the Azerbaijani musical theater, he became its choirmaster. In a relatively short period of time, he managed to achieve excellent results: if in 1910 reviewers wrote more than once about the weakness of the choir, then a year later the Baku press noted great advances in its work. Since the emergence of the Azerbaijani musical theater, he has firmly connected his fate with it. He takes a great part in the production of the first national opera. Possessing, according to modern newspapers, "a not bad baritone", he immediately became one of the leading Azerbaijani opera actors and, as the newspapers emphasized, "in a short time of his artistic activity ... he managed to gain great popularity". So, in the newspaper "Kaspiy" dated November 14, 1910, it was said:

The chorus was weak and sluggish. In contrast to Huseyngulu Sarabski, Ahmed Bashir oglu Agdamski (real name Badalbeyli), Mir Jafar Abbas oglu Bagirov, Hussein Agha Sultan oglu Hajibababekov and some other artists, Teregulov did not master the art of khanende, which, however, was natural for a singer with a low voice. But he well mastered the European vocal style of singing.

In the Azerbaijani operas of Uzeyir Hajibeyov, Teregulov played Nofal in the opera "Leyla and Majun", Mestaver in the opera "hah Abbas and Khurshud Banu", and Black Priest in the opera "Asli and Karam" and Nofel, in the role of father Khumar, the heroine of the opera "Sheikh Sanan". In the premiere of “Arshin Mal Alan”, which took place on October 25, 1913, in the Baku theater of Haji Zeynalabdin Tagiyev (stage director G. Arablinsky), the role of Asker was played by Huseyngulu Sarabski, Gulchohry by Ahmed Agdamski, Sultan Bey by Alekber Huseynzade, Suleiman by Hanifa Teregulov. The modern press highly appreciated his artistic activity. Even before the revolution, his name was often found on the pages of the Theater and Art magazine, published in Moscow and St. Petersburg.

== Political activity ==
After the February Revolution of 1917, together with his brother Ali, he created the Bolshevik organization Birlik (Unity) in Baku, which included mainly Tatar workers from the Baku oil fields, and, as the Chairman of this organization, was elected to the composition Baku Committee of the RSDLP(b). Together with the Gummet organization, Birlik was part of the all-Baku organization of the RSDLP (b). In March 1919, he was elected to the Astrakhan Bureau of the Gummet organization of the RCP(b). During these years, he took part in the battles with the counter-revolution in Urda, then went to party work in Orenburg, where he headed the Commission for Combating the Counter-Revolution, traveling in connection with this far beyond the borders of the Orenburg province. In 1920 he returned to Baku and was actively involved in the social and cultural life of the city. In this time he worked as a:

- Head of the Department of Arts of the People's Commissariat of Education of the Republic of Azerbaijan.
- The first organizer and head of the Azerbaijan Photo-Cinema Administration (AFKU), which was created in 1923 in Baku under the People's Commissariat for Education of the Republic.
- Under his leadership, the first full-length feature film in the republic "The Legend of the Maiden's Tower" (1923, directed by Vlad. Ballyuzek) was shot at the Baku Film Studio, which was transformed on his initiative, where he himself played one of the main roles - the role of the khan of Baku.

He died in Baku in 1942.

== Awards ==
- For active revolutionary and cultural and educational activities, he was twice awarded the title of "Hero of Labor"
- On April 4, 1978, a scientific session was held at the Institute of Party History under the Central Committee of Azerbaijan, a branch of the Institute of Marxism-Leninism, dedicated to the 100th anniversary of his birth.

== Sources ==
- Kazımzadə, Aydın (2004). Bizim "Azərbaycanfilm". Mütərcim.
