= Hajibeyli Brothers' Opera-Operetta Artists' Troupe =

Artists trio

- Azerbaijani: Hacıbəyli qardaşlarının opera-operetta artistləri dəstəsi
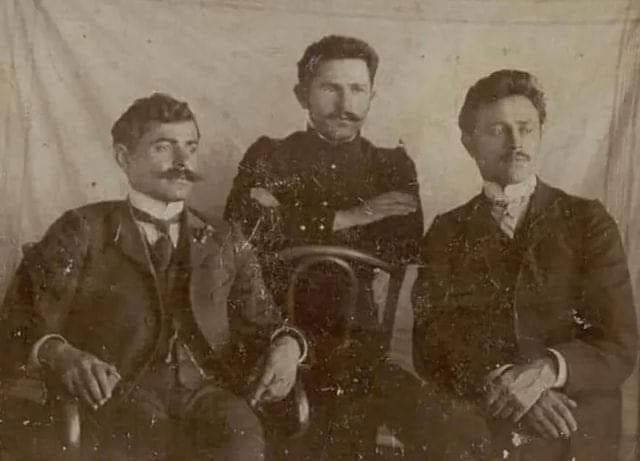
- Leader: Uzeyir Hajibeyli Zulfugar Hajibeyli

The Hajibeyli Brothers' Opera-Operetta Artists' Troupe— an independent troupe of artists that operated in Azerbaijan. The troupe was led by Uzeyir Hajibeyli and Zulfuqar Hajibeyli.

== Creation ==
In 1914, after a conflict arose between Uzeyir Hajibeyli and the "Nijat" society regarding ownership of the "Leyli and Majnun" opera, the Hajibeyli Brothers' management was established. On August 31, 1916, Uzeyir and Zulfuqar founded the "Hajibeyli Brothers' Opera-Operetta Artists' Troupe." The troupe was led by Uzeyir Hajibeyli. The newspaper "Açıq Söz" wrote the following about this:

"A troupe named 'Hajibeyli Brothers' Opera-Operetta Troupe' has been organized under the management of Uzeyir Bey Hajibeyli. All of our renowned artists are part of this troupe. Dramatic artist Abbas Mirza Sharifzadeh has also been recruited by Uzeyir Bey, and the directorial aspect has been entrusted to him..."

== Activity ==
The troupe not only performed in Baku but also went on tours to many cities across the Caucasus, the Volga region, and Central Asia, staging performances. The troupe's repertoire mainly consisted of the operas and operettas by the Hajibeyli brothers, such as "Leyli and Majnun", "Asli and Kerem", "Ashig Garib", "Husband and Wife", "Married but Single", "Arshin Mal Alan", "O olmasin, bu olsun", and other musical comedies.

In April 1917, the troupe toured in Tbilisi, where they staged "Arshin Mal Alan", "O olmasin, bu olsun", "Shah Ismayil", and "Ashig Garib". Abbas Mirza Sharifzadeh directed the performances, and Uzeyir Hajibeyli conducted them.

After the March 1918 genocide, the Hajibeyli brothers' opera-operetta troupe suspended its activities in Baku. On September 15, 1918, after Baku was liberated, the Government of the Azerbaijan Democratic Republic moved to the city. Following this, the Ministry of Education issued a decision on October 18, 1918, to establish the Azerbaijan State Theater in the Mayilov Brothers' Theater building. In October of that year, Zulfuqar and Uzeyir Hajibeyli returned to Baku and began negotiations with various artists to form a troupe from the local performers.

According to the "Azerbaijan" newspaper’s October 21, 1918 issue, the Hajibeyli brothers initiated the creation of a troupe in Baku, which included all drama, opera, and operetta artists, regardless of their specific field of stage performance. The troupe consisted of more than 26 prominent stage artists. The performances of the troupe founded by the Hajibeyli brothers were mainly held in the State Theater building in Baku. Later, a branch of the Hajibeyli brothers' theater troupe was established in Shusha.

During the period of the Azerbaijan Democratic Republic, charity performances became widespread. On October 26, 1918, 22,292 rubles raised from a performance of Shamsaddin Sami's "Gaveyi-Ahangar" by the troupe were donated to the Azerbaijan Republic Army to support the families of martyrs. Later, on March 4, 1919, the Hajibeyli brothers staged the tragedy "Nadir Shah" to raise funds for the creation of a gravestone for the murdered actor Huseyn Arablinski and to provide financial assistance to his mother.

In 1919, the Hajibeyli brothers' troupe went on a tour to Istanbul, Turkey. The tour was so successful that they rented the Eastern Theater in Istanbul for several months. After one of the performances of "Arshin Mal Alan" in Istanbul, a representative of the French film company "Pathé" approached the actors. He invited the Azerbaijani actors to Paris to perform *Arshin Mal Alan* and proposed to shoot a film based on the play at the end of a one-month tour. After returning to Baku, the actors received Uzeyir Hajibeyli's approval. The government of the Azerbaijan Republic also gave its consent to the film project. However, due to the April occupation that followed, the trip to Paris and the film's production could not take place.

As soon as the Azerbaijan Republic fell, on April 28, 1920, an emergency meeting was held, and the troupe's management, which had operated successfully for many years, was dissolved due to its "loss of credibility." It was replaced by the "Union of Turkish Actors," with Mammadali Sidgi appointed as the representative of the Union.

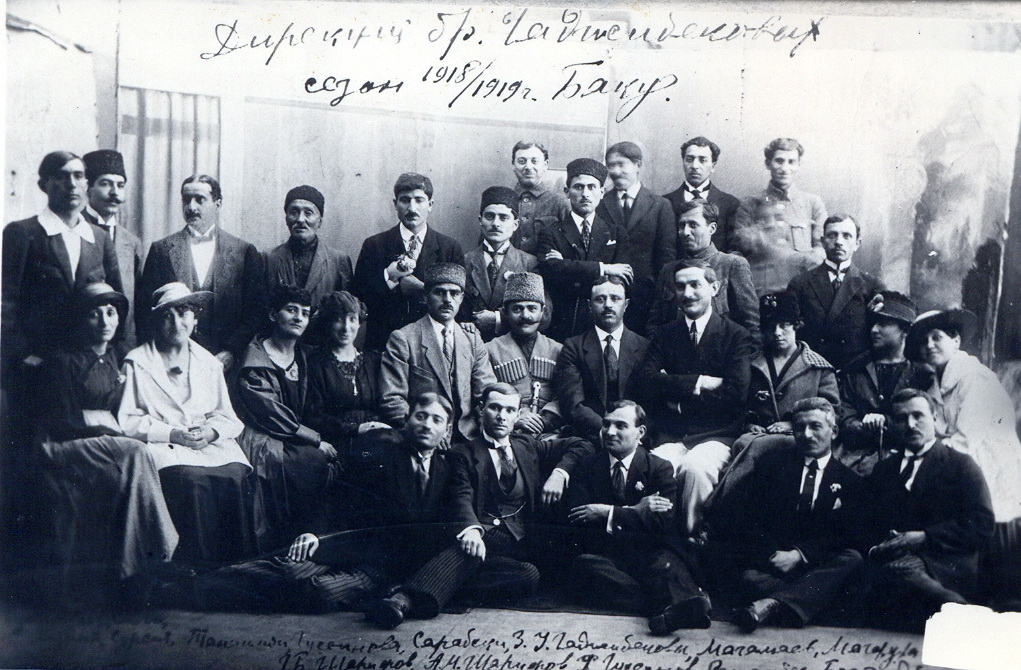
