= Statue of Uzeyir Hajibeyov (Shusha) =

Monument in Shusha, Azerbaijan

Statue of Uzeyir Hajibeyov Üzeyir Hacıbəyovun heykəli
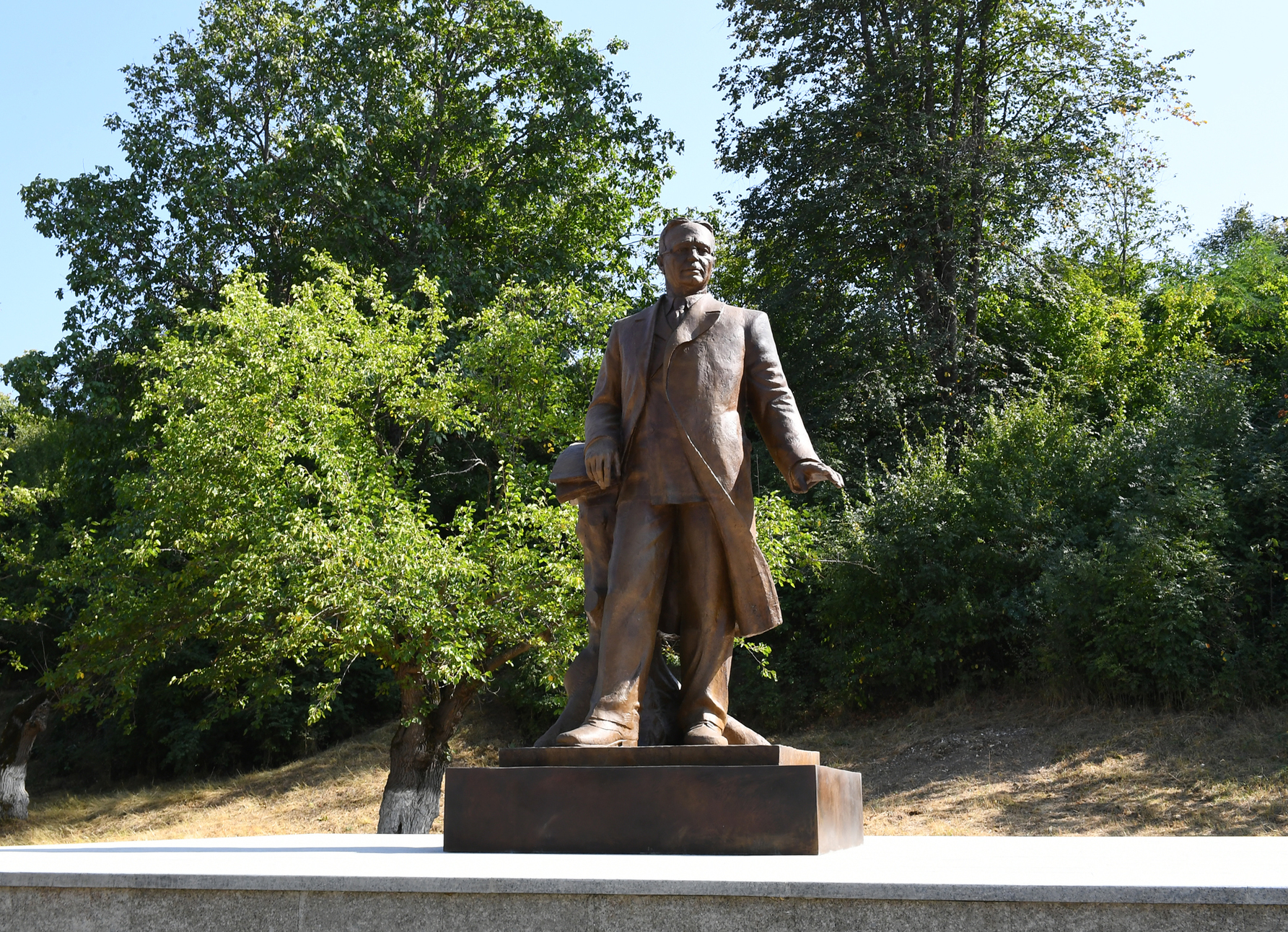
- Location: Shusha, Azerbaijan
- Material: bronze
- Beginning date: 1985
- Restored date: 2021

Statue of Uzeyir Hajibeyov (Azerbaijani: Üzeyir Hacıbəyovun heykəli) is a monument erected in 1985 to Uzeyir Hajibeyov, an Azerbaijani composer, musicologist-scientist, publicist, dramatist, pedagogue and public figure, founder of modern Azerbaijani professional music art and national opera, composer of the national anthem of the Republic of Azerbaijan, author of the first opera in the Muslim East, in his hometown of Shusha. The statue became a victim of vandalism after the city of Shusha came under Armenian control. After the liberation of the city, it was restored in 2021, and its official opening took place on August 29.

== History ==
In 1985, on the occasion of Uzeyir Hajibeyov's 100th anniversary, a statue of the composer was erected in Shusha. The monument, created by the sculptor Ahmad Tsalikov, was completely destroyed during the First Karabakh War in 1992.

Restoration of the statue came up only after the city was liberated.

== Restoration ==
According to the order of the President of Azerbaijan, Ilham Aliyev, a new statue of the composer was made. Since there is no model of the statue, the new monument was created based on photos published in the press of that time and kept in the archive.

With the support of the Heydar Aliyev Foundation, the bronze statue was erected in its former place in the city of Shusha. The monument was made by sculptors Aslan Rustamov, Teymur Rustamov, and Mahmud Rustamov.

On August 29, 2021, a new statue of Uzeyir Hajibeyov was inaugurated in the city of Shusha. President of the Republic of Azerbaijan Ilham Aliyev and First Vice President Mehriban Aliyeva opened the statue by removing the cover from the statue.
