= Rovshan bey Afandizade =

- Rövşən bəy Əfəndizadə
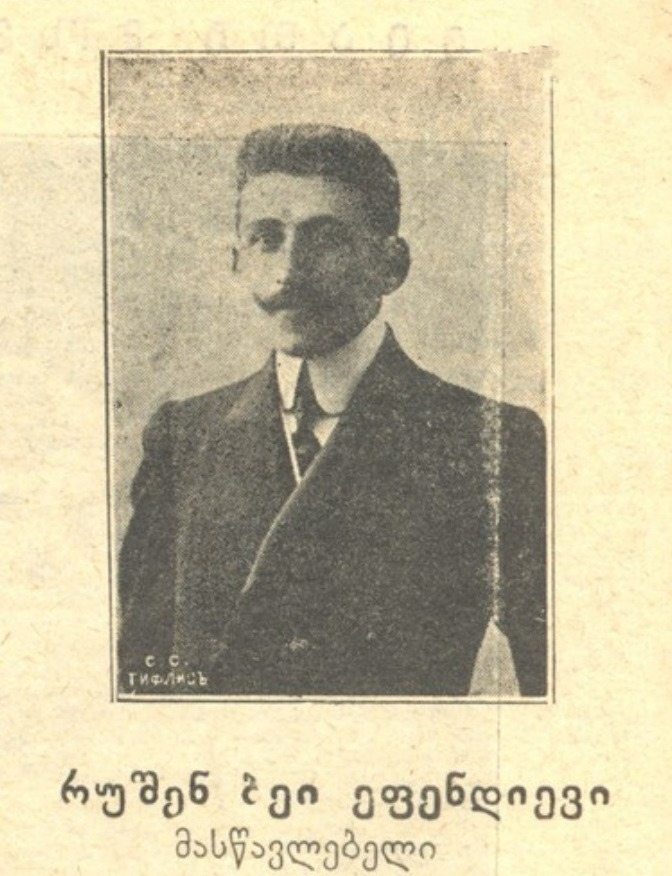
- Born: Mir Rovshan bey Mustafa oghlu Afandizade; 12 January 1885; Nukha, Elizavetpol Governorate, Russian Empire
- Occupations: Educator, public figure, theatre administrator

Rovshan bey Afandizade (Azerbaijani: Rövşən bəy Əfəndizadə; born Mir Rovshan bey Mustafa oghlu Afandizade; 12 January 1885 – unknown) was an Azerbaijani public figure, educator, pedagogue and theatre administrator. He was associated with educational and cultural activity in Nukha, Tiflis and Baku, and worked as a clerk of the Hajibeyli Brothers' Opera-Operetta Artists' Troupe.

== Biography ==
Afandizade was born on 12 January 1885 in Nukha (present-day Shaki, Azerbaijan). His grandfather, Muhammad Efendi, was a well-known religious figure in Shaki, and his family was connected with local religious and educational circles. He received his early education at a Russo-Tatar school and in 1896 entered the Nukha progymnasium. After graduating with excellent marks, he entered the Baku Technical School in 1901, where he studied for two years.

In 1904, Afandizade began teaching in Nukha, where he worked as a teacher and supervisor. In 1905, amid political unrest in the Russian Empire and ethnic conflict in the South Caucasus, the governor-general of Elizavetpol Governorate ordered his exile from the Caucasus because of his public activity. According to contemporary accounts, intervention by prominent figures including Sheikh-ul-Islam Muhammad Pishnamazzade and Alakbar bey Rafibeyli helped prevent his exile, although he was no longer allowed to live in Nukha. He then worked for one year as a teacher in the Kazakh uezd.

From 1906, Afandizade taught Russian at a new-method school in Nukha. A 1907 article in Tazə həyat (lit. 'New Life') noted his appointment as a Russian-language teacher at the first national school in Shaki.

From 1908, he worked as a teacher in Tiflis. He became active in cultural and charitable work and organized drama circles. In 1911, he was one of the eight board members of the Tiflis Muslim Dramatic Society, established on the initiative of Jalil Mammadguluzadeh and Jahangir bey Gayibov.

In 1915, together with Alimardan bey Topchubashov and Mahammad Amin Rasulzade, he attended the funeral of Georgian poet Akaki Tsereteli and delivered a speech. The Georgian magazine Teatri da tsxovreba published his photograph and reported on the speeches by Azerbaijani representatives at the ceremony.

During the World War I, Afandizade worked to support Turkish prisoners of war and officers brought to Tiflis. He also took part in the establishment of a shelter for homeless children in the city. On the proposal of Khosrov bey Sultanov, he travelled through areas near the Caucasus front, including Karakilisa, Kars, Erivan and Gyumri.

After the February Revolution of 1917, Afandizade became a member of the executive committee of the Tiflis Muslim National Committee and the Caucasian Military Council. On 5 July 1917, as part of an Azerbaijani delegation, he attended a reception with Ottoman sultan Mehmed V at Yıldız Palace in Istanbul.

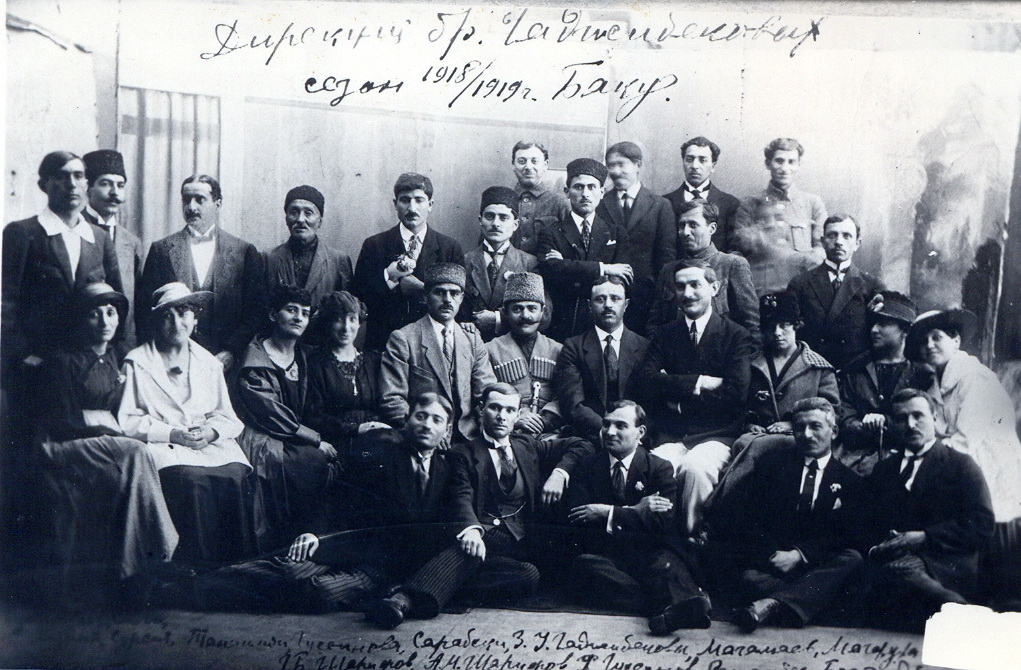
Afandizade, second from right, with the Hajibeyli Brothers' Opera-Operetta Artists' Troupe in Baku, 1918–1919.

After returning from Turkey, Afandizade moved from Tiflis to Baku and continued teaching. He later became associated with the Azerbaijani stage and served as a clerk of the Hajibeyli Brothers' Opera-Operetta Artists' Troupe.

Information about his later life is limited. According to his nephew Mustafa, Afandizade later lived in Baku, worked as a Russian-language teacher, and became a victim of the Soviet repressions of the 1930s.
