= Zulfugar Hajibeyov =

Azerbaijani composer (1884–1950)

Zulfugar Hajibeyov Zülfüqar Hacıbəyov
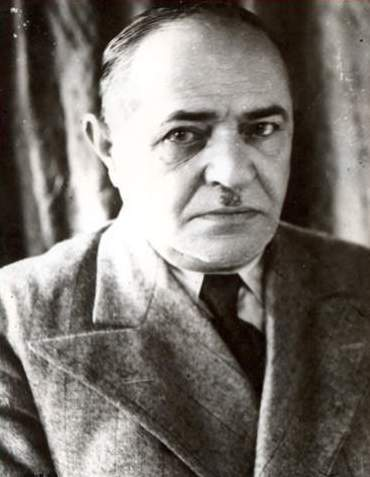
- Born: Zulfugar bey Hajibeyli; April 17, 1884; Shusha, Shusha uezd, Elizavetpol Governorate, Russian Empire
- Died: September 30, 1950 (aged 66); Baku, Azerbaijan SSR, Soviet Union
- Resting place: Alley of Honor, Baku, Azerbaijan
- Occupation: Composer
- Children: Niyazi Hajibeyov (son)
- Relatives: Uzeyir Hajibeyov (brother); Jeyhun Hajibeyli (brother)

Zulfugar bey Abdulhuseyn oghlu Hajibeyov (Azerbaijani: Zülfüqar bəy Əbdülhüseyn bəy oğlu Hacıbəyov, 17 April 1884 – 30 September 1950) was an Azerbaijani composer and a member of a family noted for its musical talents. He was one of the founders of the Azerbaijan Music Comedy Theater.

== Biography ==
Hajibeyov was born in Shusha on 17 April 1884.

Hajibeyov's brother Uzeyir Hajibeyov is considered the "Father of Classical Music" in Azerbaijan. Their brother Jeyhun was a publicist, journalist, and ethnographer, and helped Uzeyir compose the opera Layla and Majnun.

His son, Niyazi Hajibeyov, was also a composer, and directed the Azerbaijan State Symphony Orchestra for 40 years.

Hajibeyov died on 30 September 1950. He is buried in the Alley of Honor in Baku, Azerbaijan. Hajibeyov's house in Shusha is classified as a historical monument "bearing state importance" by Azerbaijan.

== Works ==
=== Musical comedies ===
Musical comedies
Title	Translated title	Year of release
Əlli yaşında cavan	Young at Fifty Years Old	1909
On bir yaşlı arvad	Eleven-Year-Old Woman	1911
Evli ikən subay	Single while Married	1911

=== Opera ===
- Ashiq Qarib ("The Wandering Ashiq"), after the anonymous Azerbaijani romantic dastan of the same name, 1915.

=== Film ===
With his son Niyazi, Hajibeyov wrote the music for one of the first films of Azerbaijan, Almaz, released in 1936.
