= Husband and Wife =

Husband and Wife may refer to:

- Marriage, a legal or ritual union between individuals, usually but not always between a husband and wife
- Husband and Wife (operetta), a 1910 Azerbaijani operetta by Uzeyir Hajibeyov
- Husband and Wife (1916 film), an American silent drama movie with Holbrook Blinn and Ethel Clayton
- Husband and Wife (1952 film), an Italian comedy movie by Eduardo De Filippo
- Husband and Wife (1953 film), a Japanese movie directed by Mikio Naruse
- Husband and wife trees, a colloquial term for conjoined trees
- Fuqi feipian (Chinese: 夫妻肺片; lit. 'husband and wife lung pieces'), a dish in Sichuan cuisine

== See also ==
- Husbands and Wives (disambiguation)
