= Chemist Cultural Palace =

- Interactive map of Chemist Cultural Palace
- Location: Sumgait, Azerbaijan
- Coordinates: 40°34′43.9″N 49°40′51.9″E
- Capacity: 1063

Construction
- Opened: 1986

Chemist Cultural Palace (Azerbaijani: Kimyaçı Mədəniyyət Sarayı) also known as Chemist Cultural Palace named after Uzeyir Hajibeyov is a cultural center in Sumgait, Azerbaijan. It was established in 1986.

== History ==
Entryway to Chemist Cultural Palace

The Chemist Cultural Palace, named after Uzeyir Hajibeyov, was established in 1986 in Sumgait, Azerbaijan. In 2011, President Ilham Aliyev visited Sumgait and assessed the condition of the cultural palace. Following this, instructions were given for significant renovation work. Renovations began in October 2013, and by the end of that year, the reconstruction was completed. The palace is home to various artistic and cultural activities, including workshops in traditional singing, percussion, dance, and instrumental performance. It also hosts visual and applied arts clubs, as well as traditional hand-weaving workshops. One of the notable features is a carpet tapestry, created in 1980 by Khalida Seyidova, which displays portraits of historical figures, Gobustan rock carvings, and carpet patterns. In 2017, President Ilham Aliyev visited the palace again, where he observed works by local artisans.

== Building ==
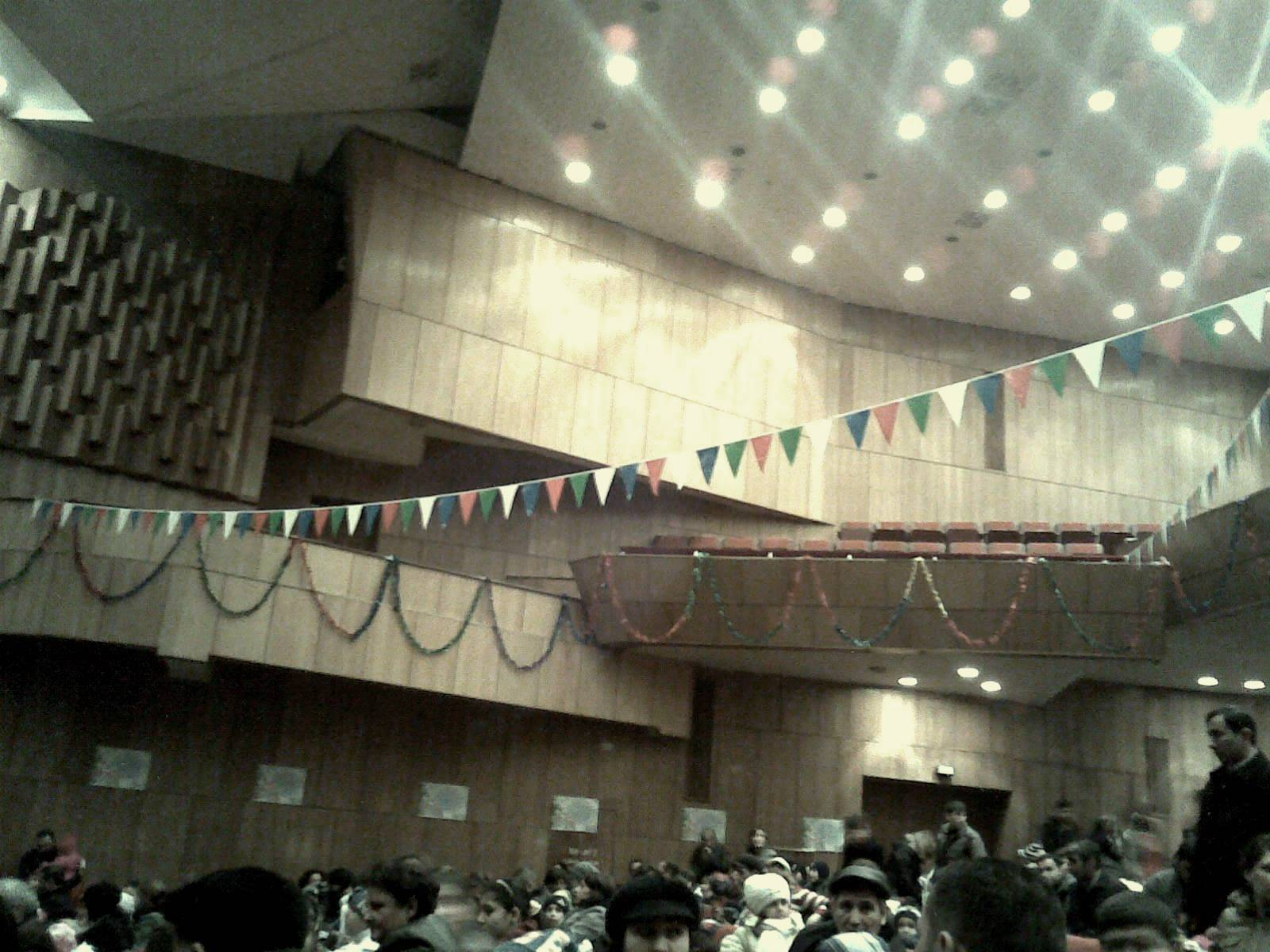
Hall of the Palace, 2012

The Chemist Cultural Palace is a three-story building with a total area of 6,900 square meters. The first floor contains a concert hall with 1,063 seats, while the second floor has a conference hall with 204 seats. The palace also includes 56 rooms used for various activities such as workshops, training, and rehearsal spaces, where around 350 young participants take part in artistic activities. The building includes a 750-seat concert hall with modern acoustic systems, guest rooms, dressing rooms, and a director's office. There is also a 270-square-meter dance hall, a café, and various club rooms. The renovation work, completed in 2013, updated the palace's design to meet modern standards of functionality and accessibility.

== Palace Square ==
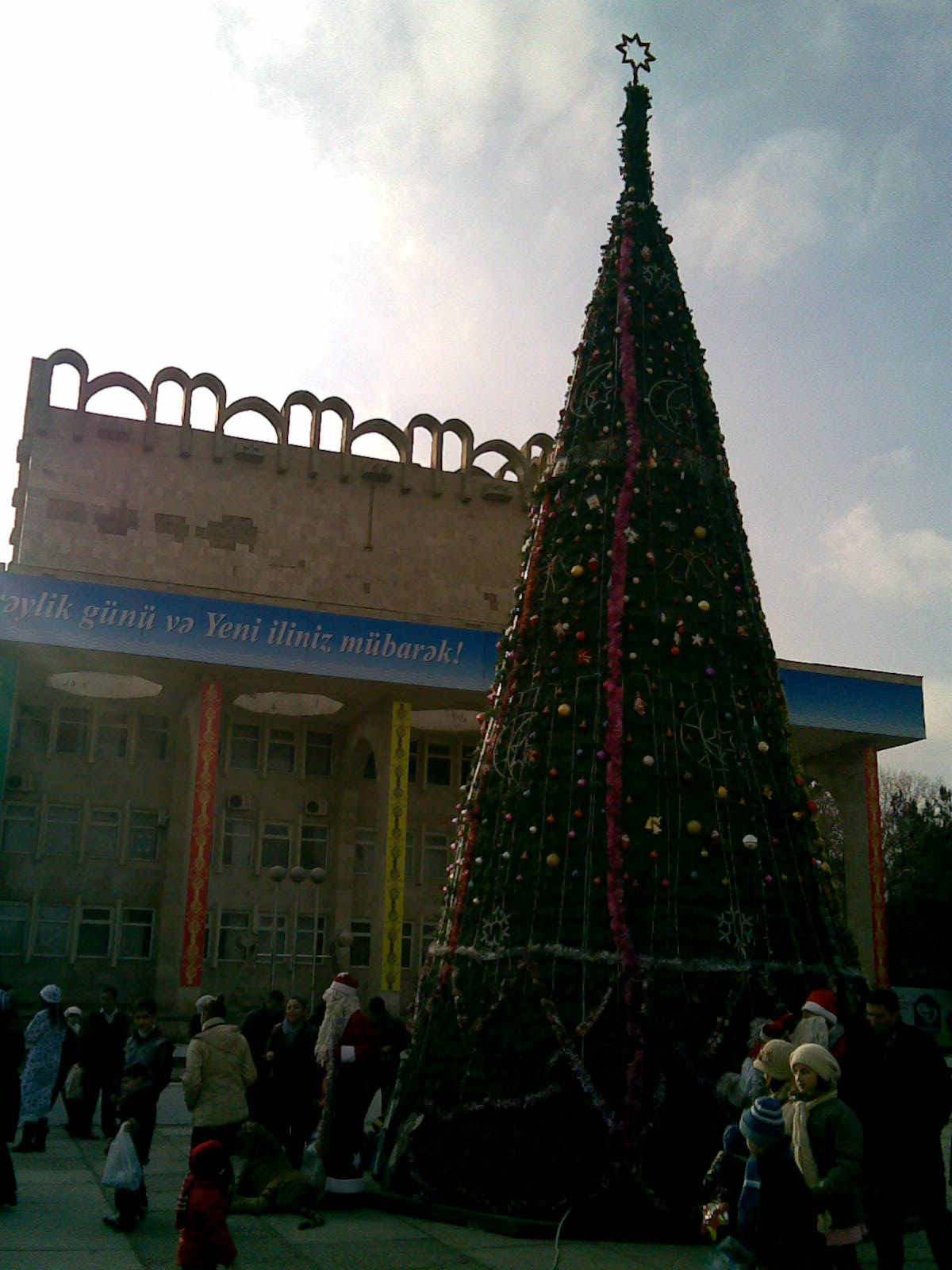
New Year's event in the palace square, 2012.

There is a 5-hectare square in front of the Chemist Cultural Palace, which features landscaped areas and greenery. The square includes a fountain, parking for 100 vehicles, and renovated communication lines and lighting systems. It also serves as an open-air space for events hosted by the palace.
