= Rustam and Zohrab =

Opera by Uzeyir Hajibeyov

- Mugham opera by Uzeyir Hajibeyov
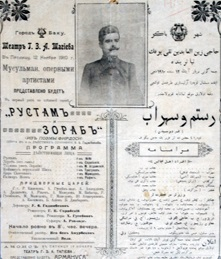
- Program of the first staging
- Librettist: Uzeyir Hajibeyov; Azer Buzovnali
- Language: Azeri
- Based on: "Rostam and Sohrab" in Shahnameh by Ferdowsi
- Premiere: 12 November 1910; Azerbaijan

Rustam and Zohrab (in Azeri Rüstәm vә Söһrab) is the third mugham opera by Uzeyir Hajibeyov. It was composed in 1910 based on the story of Rostam and Sohrab of the epic poem Shahnameh by Ferdowsi, and written in Persian.

Hajibeyov shortened the mugham scene in this opera, devoting much attention to the author's music. The existence of several versions of its libretto created an authorship controversy. This was investigated by M. Aslanov, who determined Uzeyir Hajibeyov as the primary author, as well as other poems initially attributed to poet and gazel writer Azer Buzovnali.

The opera premiered on November 12, 1910, in the H. Z.Taghiyev theatre in Baku, with Huseyngulu Sarabski as stage director and Hajibeyov as conductor. Huseyngulu Sarabski (Zohrab), Ahmed Agdamski (Tahmina), M. H. Teregulov (Keykavus) and others played the leading parts. The opera did not achieve success and Hajibeyov took it off the stage. After some revisions the opera was to be staged in March 1915 at a benefit performance of Muslim Magomayev, although it was eventually cancelled due to lack of popularity.
