= Ahmed Agdamski =

Azerbaijani opera singer (1884–1954)

Ahmed Agdamski Аымед Агдамски
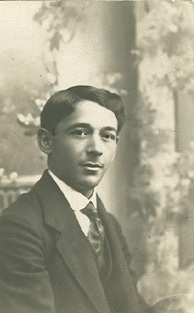
- Born: Əhməd Bəşir oğlu Bədəlbəyli; January 5, 1884; Shusha, Elisabethpol Governorate, Russian Empire
- Died: April 1, 1954 (aged 70); Agdash, Azerbaijan SSR, Soviet Union
- Other names: Ahmed Bashir oglu Badalbeyli, Ahmed Badalbeyli
- Occupations: Actor, singer

Ahmed Agdamski (Azerbaijani: Əhməd Ağdamski) also known by the stage name of Ahmed Bashir oglu Badalbeyli (Azerbaijani: Əhməd Bəşir oğlu Bədəlbəyli) (January 5, 1884 – April 1, 1954) who was a Soviet Azerbaijani opera singer, mugam singer and actor.

== Biography ==
Ahmadbey Badalbeyli was born on January 5, 1884, in Shusha, Elisabethpol Governorate, Russian Empire. He attended circles of theater-lovers and participated in national spectacles from his childhood.

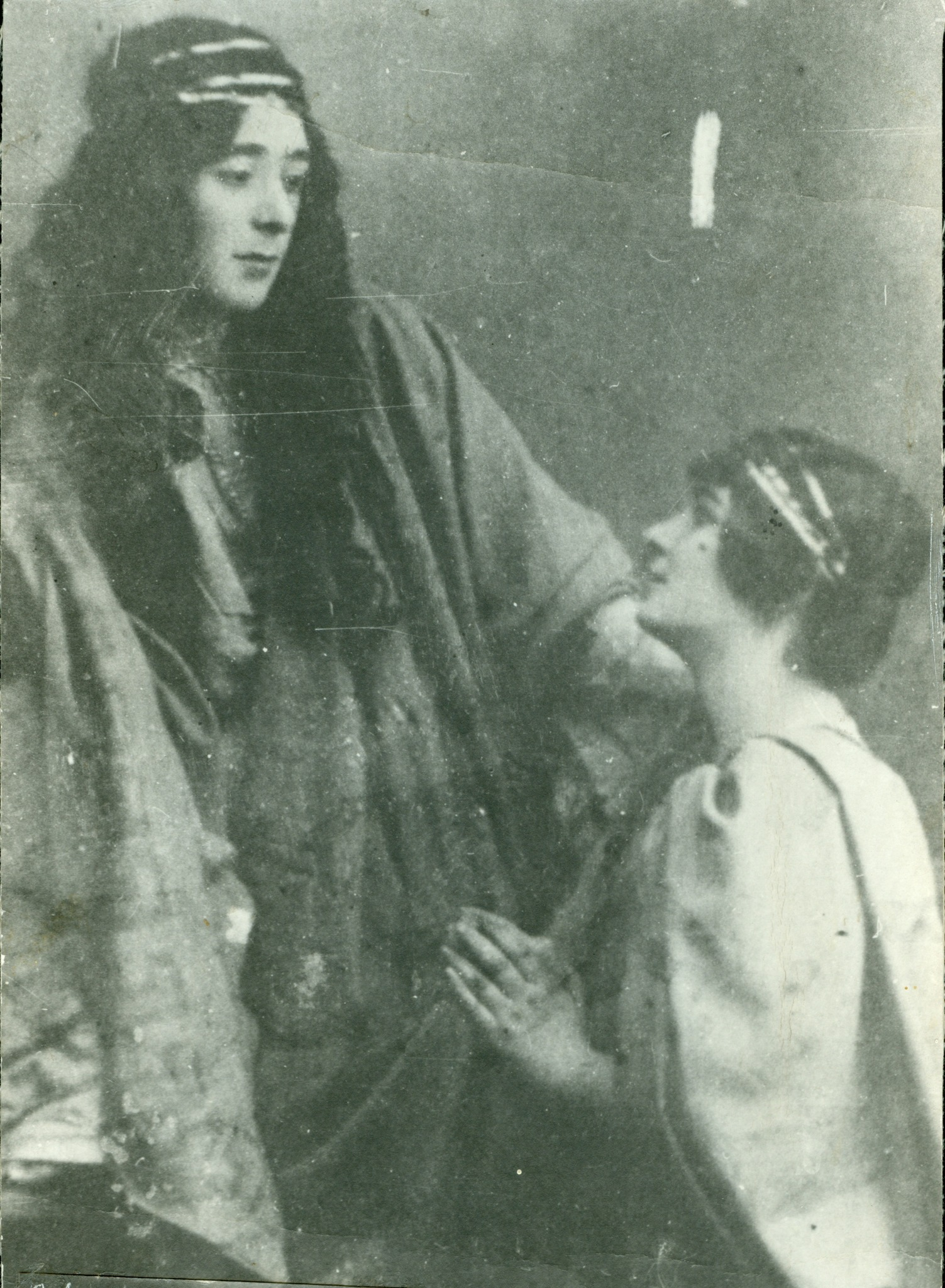
Ahmed Agdamski acting as Leyli from Leyli and Majnun

Scenic activity of the actor began in 1910, with attendance of a theatrical troupe of “Nijat” charity union. He was famous for his performance of women roles in various operas in the early history of Azeri Opera, when women's appearance on stage was strictly forbidden by religion and tradition. But later he began to play male parts, too. Besides all these he also was engaged in pedagogic activity. He was always persecuted because of playing women's parts. Ahmedbey changed his surname and address. For several years he was known as Miri. At the beginning of the 1920s he returned to Karabakh, where he established a theatrical troupe in Aghdam city, in 1923. In 1934, he moved to Agdash.

In 1943, Ahmad Agdamski was conferred “Honored Art Worker of Azerbaijan” title.

He died on April 1, 1954.

Muslim women were not allowed to play in theater in Azrebaijan and this is why men played female parts. Ahmed Agdamski, whose nice voice and fine constitution helped him in creation of female roles, was one of them. He played pieces of Leyli (“Leyli and Majnun”), by persuasion of his brother Badalbey and because of refusal of Farajov (because of persecution of theater-haters), Asli (“Asli and Karam”), Gulnaz (“If Not That One, Then This One”), Gulchohra (“Arshin mal alan”), Minnat khanim (“Husband and wife”) and Tahmina (“Rustam and Zohrab”) from operas written by his cousin Uzeyir Hajibeyov. In “Shah Abbas and Khurshid Banu” he acted as poet Khurshidbanu Natavan.

In 1916, Agmed Agdamski was shot in “Arshin mal alan”, the first Azerbaijani comedy-film, which was based on motifs of an opera of the same name written by Uzeyir Hajibeyov.

Agdamski also played the female role of Gulchohra in the 1917 Azeri film The Cloth Peddler. He died on April 1, 1954, in Agdash, Azerbaijan SSR, Soviet Union.

== Literature ==
- Huseynov, Rafael. The Thousand and Second Night. Baku, Ishyq, 1988. ISBN 5-89650-085-8 (in Azeri)

== External links and sources ==
- Ahmed Agdamski at IMDb
