= Sheikh Sanan =

Sheikh Sanan may refer to:

- Sheikh San'Aan, Persian mystical poem
- Sheikh Sanan (play), a verse play by Huseyn Javid
- Sheikh Sanan (opera), an opera by Uzeyir Hajibeyov
