= Kerem and Aslı =

16th century Turkish-Azerbaijani love story

Kerem and Aslı (Azerbaijani: Əsli və Kərəm; Turkish: Kerem ile Aslı) is a tragic love story from the Turkish-Azerbaijani popular poetry of the 16th century. The story probably originated in Azerbaijan or Eastern Anatolia and is widespread throughout the Caucasus and Central Asia.

== The story ==
Kerem and Aslı is performed by Aşık. These sing and tell the love between Kerem, son of the Muslim Padishah of Isfahan, and Aslı, daughter of an Armenian-Christian monk or priest. Sometimes her father is also described as the ruler's treasurer. Kerem falls in love with Aslı. However, her father refuses to consent to the wedding due to his religious affiliation. The father flees with his daughter out of fear of the Padishah, and Kerem sets out with his friend Sofu to find her. After a long hike, they finally find Aslı and, at the behest of Aleppo’s pasha, the couple is married. On the wedding night, the buttons of the enchanted robe that the monk has put on his daughter cannot be released. Kerem breathes such a deep sigh that he goes up in flames. Aslı tries to put out the fire and save Kerem, but to no avail. When Aslı leans over the heap of ashes weeping from her lover, her hair catches fire and she burns too.

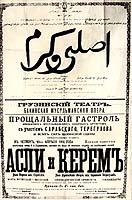
The Opera Poster

The story is handed down in numerous variants, describing in detail the adventures of Kerems' and Sofus', who are looking for Khoy, Tbilisi, Ganja and Yerevan. Aşık Kerem, as he is also called, recites poems in caravanserais or coffee houses, in which he conjures up the beauty of Aslı, which he combines with mountains like the Mount Nemrut and the Mount Süphan and rivers like the Murat River and the Kızılırmak or compared with the beauty of cranes and gazelles. Together with Sofu they fight many dangers.

The story is often enriched with fateful coincidences and extrasensory motifs: the two lovers were born at the same hour and grew up together. Sometimes magic was involved when the two main characters were born or Khidr saves Kerem from extreme need, rivers and mountains clear the way when Kerem starts a poem, and Kerem speaks with skulls on the Mount Judi, the site of the Noah's Ark.

== Publications and adaptations ==
The earliest known record is found in the 16th century Mecmûatü’l-Letâif Sandükatü’z-Zerâif (The Collections of Jokes, Chest of Giraffes). The story was published and processed many times in print at the end of the 19th century. Ahmed Fahri wrote a play in five acts on the subject in 1888. In the same year Leopold Grünfeld translated Kerem and Aslı into German (Anatolian folk songs from the Kaba Dil. Leipzig 1888). Other scholars who dealt with Kerem and Aslı were Mehmet Fuat Köprülü, Pertev Naili Boratav and Cahit Öztelli. Üzeyir Hacıbəyov processed the material into an opera ("Əsli və Kərəm") in 1912 as did Ahmed Adnan Saygun ("Kerem") decades later. Folk music has its own song form, which is called "Kerem havaları".

In 1942 Adolf Körner and 1971 Orhan Elmas filmed the material. In 2002, a television series called "Aslı ile Kerem" was created as a contemporary adaptation.

Asli and Kerem, Azerbaijani opera was premiered in 1912.

== Print publications ==
- Besim Atalay: şık Kerem . Istanbul 1930.
- Eflâtun Cem Güney: Kerem ile Aslı . 1959th

== Literature ==
- Şükrü Elçin: Kerem ile Aslı Hikayesi (Araştırma-İnceleme). Ankara 2000.
- Ali Duymaz: Kerem ile Aslı hikâyesi: Üzerinde Mukayeseli Bir Araştırma. Ankara 2001.
