= Asli and Kerem =

Opera written by Uzeyir Hajibeyov

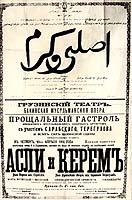
Program of the opera "Asli and Karam"

Asli and Karam (Azerbaijani: Əsli və Kərəm) is the fifth mugham opera in four acts and six scenes written by Uzeyir Hajibeyov. Its libretto was written by the composer based on motifs of broadly famed in the South Caucasus poem Kerem and Aslı (also Asli and Kerem). The invincible power of love and spiritual beauty of man is glorified and feudal relations and nationalistic tendencies propagandized by clerical circles are attacked.

The premiere was held on May 31, 1912, in Azerbaijan State Academic Opera and Ballet Theater. Huseyn Arablinski directed and Uzeyir Hajibeyov conducted. Huseyngulu Sarabski (Kerem), Ahmed Agdamski (Asli), M.Teregulov (Gara Keshish), M.Mammadov (The Shah of Isfahan), G.Goychaylinski (Shaikh Nurali) and others acted. The opera was staged in several cities of the Caucasus, Middle Asia and Iran. Besides Baku, the opera was staged in Azerbaijan (Aghdam, Nakhchivan and others), too. Since 1957, "Asli and Karam" has been staged on Azerbaijan State Opera and Ballet Theatre. In 1988, it was performed with new staging.
