= Sheikh Sanan (opera) =

- Opera by Uzeyir Hajibeyov
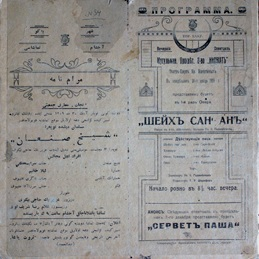
- Librettist: Uzeyir Hajibeyov
- Language: Azerbaijani language
- Based on: Folk tale "Sheikh San'Aan"
- Premiere: 13 December 1909; The premises of the Nikitin brothers Circus in Baku

Sheikh Sanan is the second opera in five acts of the Azerbaijani composer Uzeyir Hajibeyov. He wrote the libretto based on the folk tale "Sheikh San'Aan". The opera tells about the tragic love of Sheikh Sanan and the Georgian girl, Khumar. The opera's essential motive was the protest against the cruel religious canons that prevented the love between the representatives of two nationalities of different faiths.

The premiere took place on 30 November (13 December) 1909 at the Nikitin brothers' Circus in Baku. The performance's director was H. Sharifov, the conductor was Hajibeyov. The leading roles were performed by Huseyngulu Sarabski (Sheikh Sanan), Leyla Khanim (pseudonym of Tamara Bogatko; Khumar), Kh. Teregulov (father of Khumar).

The opera's theme is based on the legendary tale of Sheikh Sanan, who, under the influence of an uncontrollable passion for a beautiful Georgian woman, refusing to promote Islam, became an ardent fighter against the religion.

== See also ==
- Sheikh Sanan, 1921 play by Huseyn Javid
