= Husbands and Wives (disambiguation) =

Husbands and Wives is a 1992 film by Woody Allen.

Husbands and Wives may also refer to:

- "Husbands and Wives" (song), by Roger Miller, 1966; covered by Brooks & Dunn, 1998
- Husbands and Wives: Love or War, or The Clinic for Married Couples: Love and War, a South Korean TV series
- "Husbands and Wives" (Roseanne), a 1995 television episode
- Husbands and Wives (1920 film), based on a novel by Corra May Harris
- Husbands and Wives, a 1977 TV film starring Eddie Barth

== See also ==
- Husband and Wife (disambiguation)
- Missionaries and cannibals problem, or jealous husbands problem, a toy problem in artificial intelligence
