= Jeyhun Hajibeyli =

Azerbaijani publicist, translator and ethnographer (1891–1962)

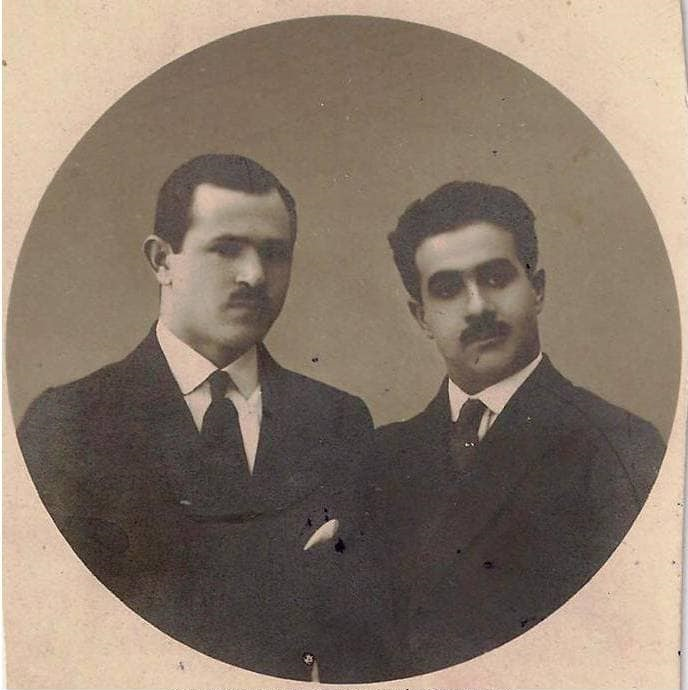
Jeyhun Hajibeyli (left) with his relative Aghalar bey Aliverdibeyov

Jeyhun bey Abdulhuseyn bey oghlu Hajibeyli (Azerbaijani: Ceyhun bəy Əbdülhüseyn bəy oğlu Hacıbəyli) (1891–1962) was an Azerbaijani publicist, journalist and ethnographer.

== Early life ==
Jeyhun Hajibeyli was born in Shusha, and was a brother of the Uzeyir Hajibeyov. After graduating from the Russian-Tatar Azerbaijani school in Shusha, he continued his education in Baku. Later he went to St. Petersburg under the sponsorship of oil baron millionaire Murtuza Mukhtarov where he entered the Law Department of the university there. After this, he continued his education at the Sorbonne University in Paris. For many years in Paris, he was one of the two most active authors of Kaspi Newspaper. During this period, he contributed to the Kaspii newspaper under the names Dzhey Daghestani or simply Daghestani.

Jeyhun Hajibeyli had an advanced command of Turkish, Persian, French, and Russian languages. He saw his interest in Russian and French cultures as an intellectual advantage. However, he was against the idea of being assimilated into these cultures. He criticized those who abandoned traditional Turkic culture by blindly following Western fashion.

In late 1907, Jeyhun Hajibeyli and his brother Uzeyir Hajibeyli co-wrote the libretto for the opera Leyli and Majnun. This work is often recognized as the first opera of the Islamic East. On January 12, 1908, Jeyhun Hajibeyli performed the role of Ibn-Salam during the first staging of the opera at the Taghiyev Theater. The brothers also collaborated on other musical projects. However, Jeyhun later left for Paris to continue his studies. Meanwhile, Uzeyir continued his work in Azerbaijan, creating new operas and comic operettas with support from his close friends, including Huseynqulu Sarabski, Huseynbala Arablinski, and Muslim Magomayev. In 1908, he became a teacher at the Saadat school, which was headed by Ali bey Huseynzade.

Hajibeyli paid particular attention to cultural issues such as Azerbaijani literature, music, and theatre. In his 1911 article titled Azerbaijani Flowers (Azərbaycan gülləri), he explored the role of Azerbaijani women in the literary field and highlighted their contributions to the nation’s cultural heritage. He also wrote memoirs about the creation and staging of the first Azerbaijani opera. He published the novella Haji Karim in Russian in 1911 and in Azerbaijani in 1917. Between 1910 and 1920, Jeyhun Hajibeyli published numerous articles in the Russian-language press in the Caucasus. His writings, which often focused on social, cultural, and economic matters, contributed significantly to the intellectual debates of his time. Jeyhun Hajibeyli was also the editor of Azerbaijan, the official newspaper of the Azerbaijan Democratic Republic.

== Exile ==
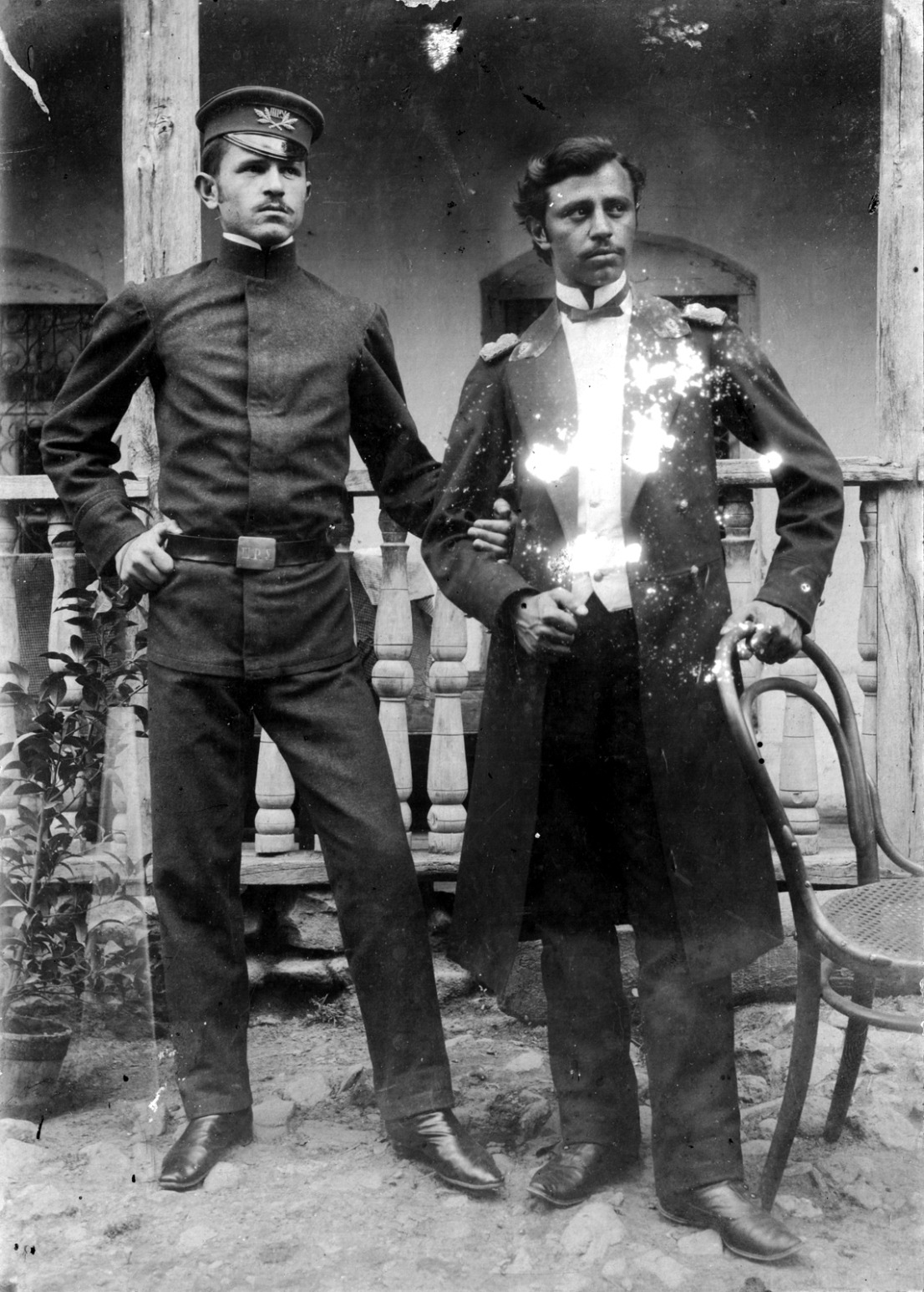
Jeyhun Hajibeyli (left) with his brother Uzeyir Hajibeyov (right)

In 1919, Jeyhun Hajibeyli, 28, accompanied the delegation of the newly organized, independent Azerbaijan Democratic Republic to France led by Alimardan bey Topchubashov to take part in the Versailles Peace Conference. Jeyhun served as interpreter and journalist. But this independent government survived only 23 months, May 1918 to April 1920. Bolsheviks captured Baku in April 1920 and soon afterwards, Azerbaijan lost its independence and became part of the Soviet Union. Jeyhun knew his life would be in jeopardy if returned to Azerbaijan, so he spent the rest of his life in France.

Jeyhun brought his Motherland that he always longed for and carried in his dreams, with him to France. He lived two lives in Paris. One was the real Paris life, the other one was the life related to his Motherland which he created in his dreams and longings and memories. Dreaming was the only way he could “communicate with his dear ones” because all mail was cut off.

He wrote in his diary:

"Yes, I have to admit that during these 40 years of separation from my dear ones that I have often longed for my sisters; and sometimes the images of my mom and my middle brother (Uzeyir) replaced the images of my sisters in my mind.

Both of them were crying bitterly when we were saying good-bye. I was trying to convince them that I was going away for only two months. I was asking them why they were crying? Now I tell myself, Jeyhun bey, you deceived them because you yourself were not aware of what would happen. Now you’re living 41 years separated from them. You never saw them again nor will you ever see them in the future - your dear ones—men and women are passing away one by one... And you yourself will, too."

It turns out that especially the remaining years of his 43 years living in exile were so sad.

Hajibeyli died in Paris in 1962 and was buried there. Uzeyir Hajibeyov died in 1948. In 1990 Azerbaijani diplomat Ramiz Abutalibov brought Jeyhun's archive to Baku from France and presented it to the Central State Literature and Art Archives. This archive consists of 20 folders. There are approximately 500 articles in those folders. It was discovered from these documents that Jeyhun Hajibeyli also wrote narratives and stories, and was involved in scientific research work. He also carried out interesting research on Azerbaijan's history, ethnography, folklore, literature and language. He also wrote the narrative, "Haji Karimin Sahari" ("The Morning of Haji Karim") which was published in the Kaspi newspaper in Baku.

In 1925 “Arshin Mal Alan”, the musical operetta written by Uzeyir Hajibeyov was staged at the Women's Theater in France based on Jeyhun Hajibeyli's translation and staging.

== Accomplishments ==
As an academic, Jeyhun Hajibeyli had a very broad range of interests. He did research on "Babak and Ancient State of Arran" and "The History of Baku and Barda". He also wrote articles about the creative work of the great Persian writers Ferdowsi and Shirazi.

One of the most valuable of his works is Karabakh's Dialect and Folklore. Bayram Aghayev, a member of the staff of the Nizami Literature Institute who is a Philology Sciences Candidate prepared this work for publication that had previously been released in Paris in Asia Magazine in 1934.

From the first words that Jeyhun Hajibeyli wrote in this monograph, we can see that he had begun work on this Karabakh Folklore volume prior to the Revolution (1920) when he was still in his Motherland. In Paris, he would enrich his work with new material that he gathered. This work was written at the request of famous Turkologist V. V. Radlov (1837–1918) who played a historical role in deciphering the Orkhan-Yenisey literary monument.

The Karabakh Folklore volume was written for a special publication — A Collection of Turkish-Tatar Dialects that Radlov was organizing. After the academician died, his successor the famous Orientalist, Professor A. N. Samoylovich studied the short research and praised it in an article. But because of World War I, provocations brought on by Armenian Dashnaks and Russian Bolsheviks against Azerbaijan in the Caucasus, finally Azerbaijan's was forced to become part of the Soviet Union. Consequently, Jeyhun's scientific work about this region could not be published.

Hajibeyli had to seek asylum in France isolated from the sphere of Russian Orientalists’ that he had developed networks and connections with and also separated from his native land Karabakh, Azerbaijan which was the object of his research.

In order to present his work to the Collection of Turkish-Tatar Dialects, the author wrote his work in Russian and prepared the examples about Karabagh's dialect, folklore and ethnography in the Cyrillic alphabet (although Arabic script was the official alphabet in Azerbaijan those days). But later in order to present his work to the French scientific community, Hajibeyli again had to revise his work and convert all the samples to Latin transcription.

This concise collection is a source for Europeans who want to learn about the East and about the Azerbaijani language, about Azerbaijan and about the ethnography of its inseparable part—Karabakh. It includes both general and specific information about our traditions, national literature and dialects. Up until that time such information was not known in France and Russia, nor even in Azerbaijan as it had not been researched and published systematically.

Karabakh folklore consists of 33 small sections—bayatis, praises, supplications, threats, vows, elegies, lullabies, endearments, jokes, humorous anecdotes used by ordinary people. Hajibeyli also showed the phonetic features of Karabakh dialect and its typical features and compares them with dialects from other Azerbaijani regions.
