= Husband and Wife (operetta) =

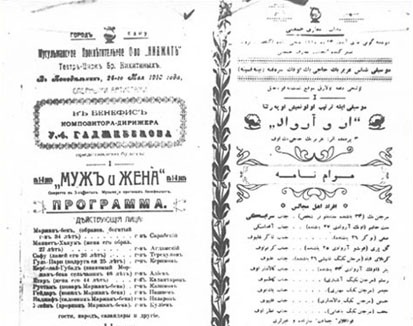
Program for the premiere of Husband and Wife

Husband and Wife (Azerbaijani: Ər və Arvad) is a musical comedy in three acts with music and libretto written by Azerbaijani composer Uzeyir Hajibeyov, and an early example of the genre in Azerbaijan. It is the first of Hajibeyov's trilogy of three musical comedies, which includes If Not That One, Then This One and Arshin mal alan.

The operetta's themes centre on the family and everyday life, oppression in the family and Azerbaijani woman in society. The premiere was held on 24 May 1910 in Baku, in the theatre-circus of the Nikitin brothers. Huseyngulu Sarabski (Marjan bey), Ahmed Agdamski (Minnat khanim), M.H.Teregulov (Safi) and Mirzagha Aliyev (Kerbelayi Gubad) played the leading parts, Huseyn Arablinski was the stage director and Uzeyir Hajibeyov was the conductor. Husband and Wife was subsequently staged in other theatres in Azerbaijan, including Nakhchivan, Aghdam and Shaki.
