= Shah Abbas and Khurshid Banu =

- Mugham opera by Uzeyir Hajibeyov
- Librettist: Uzeyir Hajibeyov
- Language: Azerbaijani
- Premiere: 10 March 1912; Baku

Shah Abbas and Khurshid Banu (Azerbaijani: Şah Abbas vә Xurşid Banu operası) – is the fourth mugham opera of Azerbaijani composer Uzeyir Hajibeyov in four acts and six scenes. A libretto also belongs to Uzeyir Hajibeyov. The opera was written basing on the motifs of Azerbaijani folk legend. The opera finishes with happy end, heroine – is a modest girl, daughter of a woodcutter who gains victory over psychology of a formidable Shah, who learns a handicraft – carpet weaving – because of his love to her.

== History ==
Premiere of the opera was held on March 10, 1912 in Nikitin brothers’ circus in Baku. Huseyn Arablinski was director of the spectacle and Muslim Magomayev was its conductor. Huseyngulu Sarabski (Shah Abbas), Ahmed Agdamski (Khurshid Banu) and M.H.Teregulov (Mestaver) played the leading parts. The opera stayed in a repertoire of the Opera and Ballet Theatre right up to 1930’s.

== Music ==
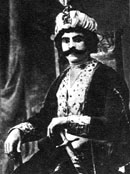
Huseyngulu Sarabski in the role of Shah Abbas

The composer broadly used mugam in the opera. There is also author’s music in the opera. Hajibeyov used an aria of traditional-classic type for the first time (I act). A basis of tonality and intonation is vividly reflected in it. It is a multisided and finished portrait of Shah Abbas. The aria is also notable for that, unlike the vocal characteristics of other earlier operas of Hajibeyov, there are revealed a lot of moods in its music. Two themes lie on its basis, the first of them is thoughtful, concentrated, lyric, and the other is decisive, march-like and associated with “Heyrati” zerb-mugham.

The aria of Shah Abbas created prerequisites for aria of Aslan Shah in “Shah Ismayil” opera of Muslim Magomayev, and also was of great importance in evolution of Hajibeyov ‘s opera style. Author’s music of mugam lies on the basis of Khurshid Banu’s aria (I act) and Mestaver’s part. Combination of traditional and new musical means expanded arsenal of composer style, promoting the opera with success.
