= Arshin Mal Alan (operetta) =

1913 operetta by Uzeyir Hajibeyov

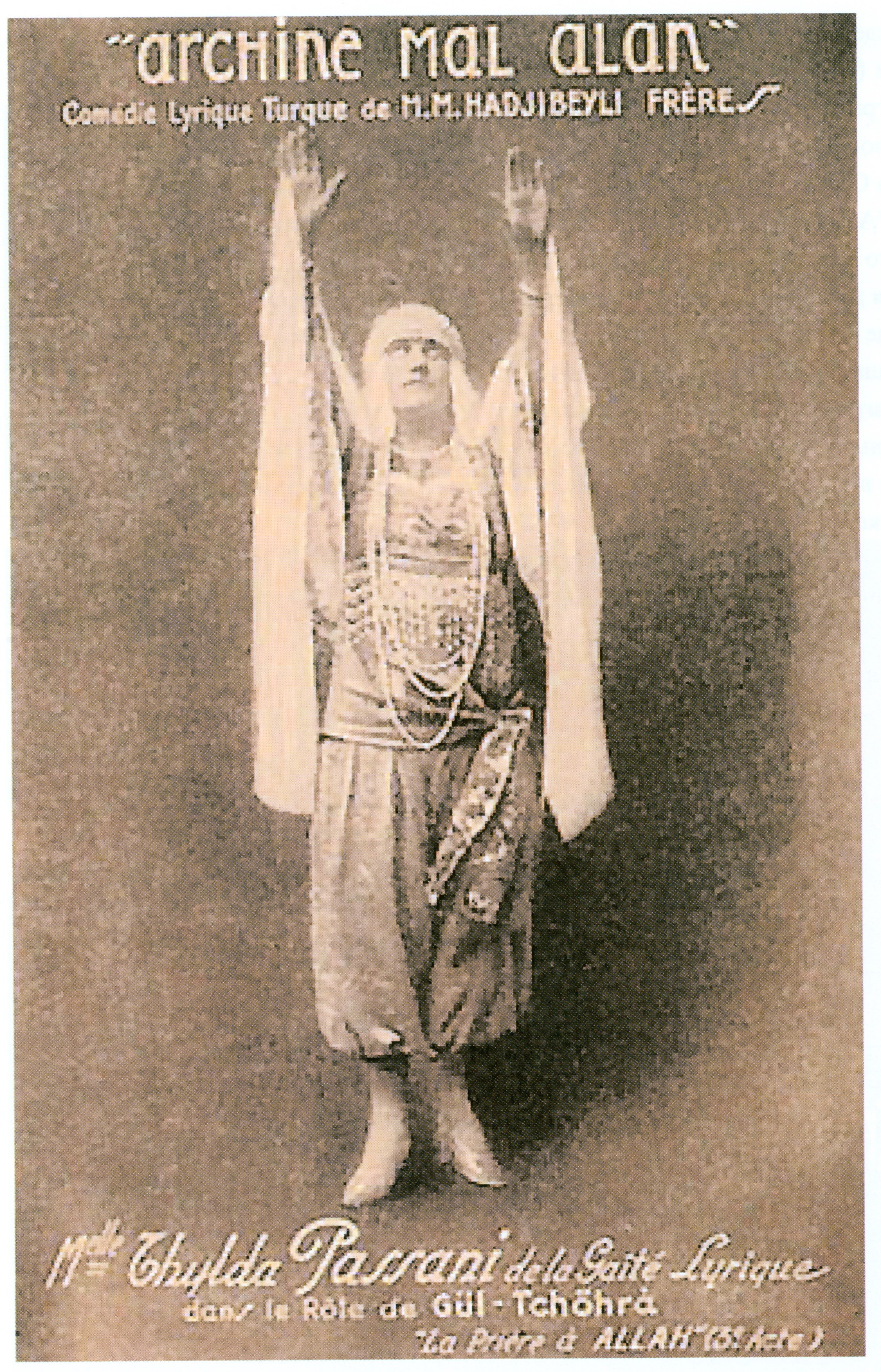
Paris theatrical poster, 1925

Arshin Mal Alan (Azerbaijani: Arşın mal alan, lit. 'The Cloth Peddler') is a 1913 comic and romantic operetta by Azerbaijani composer Uzeyir Hajibeyov about a cloth peddler in 1900s Shusha, who is looking for a wife. Hajibeyov composed the operetta in Saint Petersburg and it was staged on 25 October 1913. Part of a trilogy (If Not That One, Then This One, Husband and Wife, both in 1910), the operetta is rich in national characteristics and realism. Following the opening in Azerbaijan, Arshin Mal Alan was performed in theatres of Tbilisi, Yerevan and Ashgabat, as well as Iran and Turkey.

== Synopsis ==
The plot is centered on a bachelor named Asker, who wants to see and choose his bride before marriage. However, in 19th century Azerbaijan, women were kept at home and, when allowed out in public, they were heavily covered in hijab. Asker's friend, Suleyman, suggests that he disguise himself as a fabric peddler, a sure way to meet women. Asker agrees and starts to visit houses, selling fabrics.

Asker meets a woman called Gulchohra and they fall in love, even though Asker's actual identity remains unknown to Gulchohra. Asker reveals his identity to Gulchohra's father, the wealthy Sultan Bey, and asks for permission to marry her. Sultan Bey agrees, but Gulchohra objects because she loves the peddler. When Gulchohra realizes that the rich businessman that her father has chosen is actually her beloved peddler, she agrees to the marriage.

The operetta ends with four couples getting married at the same time.

== International performances ==
Arshin Mal Alan has been staged in many languages and in theaters in over 60 countries, including Vienna, Austria (2006); Beijing, China (2010); and Los Angeles, California, U.S. (2013).

== Characters ==
Role	Voice type
Asker – a young and wealthy merchant	tenor
Jahan – his aunt, a widow	mezzo-soprano
Suleyman – Asker's friend	baritone
Veli – Asker's servant	tenor
Sultan Bey – an impoverished bey	bass
Gulchohre – Sultan Bey's daughter	soprano
Asia – Sultan Bey's niece	soprano
Telli – Sultan Bey's servant	soprano
The action is set in Azerbaijan at the beginning of the 20th century.

== Act 1 ==
Asker, a young and wealthy merchant, is upset. His aunt, Jahan, believes him to be ill, and his malevolent servant, Veli, conceals the reason for his master's “illness”. Suleyman, one of Asker's friends, declares that it is time for Asker to get married.

According to Islamic tradition, a fiancé cannot see his fiancée before the wedding. Asker would rather marry for love, and Suleyman offers to disguise him in the clothes of a peddler, ensuring his access to private homes.

== Act 2 ==
Gulchohra, the daughter of the highborn, but impoverished, Sultan Bey, knows that her father intends to find a rich fiancé. Gulchohra doesn't want to marry a stranger, preferring to marry someone she knows and loves.

Gulchora's father is tired of being lonely, and would like to marry if he can find an appropriate widow.

When the peddler appears with his goods, he is allowed access to the women of the house. While they look at the goods, Asker looks at them. He sees Gulchohra, and falls in love. Gulchohra is also charmed by the peddler. When the women leave, Asker makes a declaration of love.

Aunt Jahan goes to Sultan Bey, as a matchmaker, at her nephew's request. Bey is glad to meet such a charming widow and makes a proposal of marriage to her. Asker agrees to give his aunt away in marriage to Sultan Bey but, in return, he wants to marry Gulchohra. The sultan is outraged at the idea of giving his daughter away to a peddler. Sultan Bey furiously turns them out of the house.

== Act 3 ==
Suleyman Bey visits Sultan Bey, and proposes wealthy Asker as a husband to Gulchohra. Sultan Bey agrees with joy. While at Sultan Bey's house, Suleyman Bey meets, and falls in love with, Asia, Sultan Bey's niece. Asia returns his feelings.

Gulchohra is upset when her father informed her about the upcoming wedding. She begs her father not to force this marriage on her, but he is unbending. Wishing to avert her daughter's resistance, he fakes her abduction and sends her to Askar's house.

== Act 4 ==
Gulchohra decides to put an end to her life rather than marry a man she doesn't love. Asker comes in at the last moment and explains everything to Gulchohre, and she is very happy. Only Sultan Bey, knowing that they deceived him, becomes angry. Aunt Jahan quickly calms the quick-tempered bey, promising to marry him.

In the end four weddings are celebrated with a happy feast: Askar to Gulchohra; Sultan Bey to Aunt Jahan, Suleyman to Asia, and Valli (Asker's servant) to Telli, Sultan Bey's servant.

== In popular culture ==
In 2013, Google created a Google Doodle based on Arshin Mal Alan for the Azerbaijani version its homepage.

== See also ==
- The Cloth Peddler (1917 film)
- The Cloth Peddler (1945 film)
