= Leyli and Majnun (opera) =

Opera by Uzeyir Hajibeyov

- Opera by Uzeyir Hajibeyov
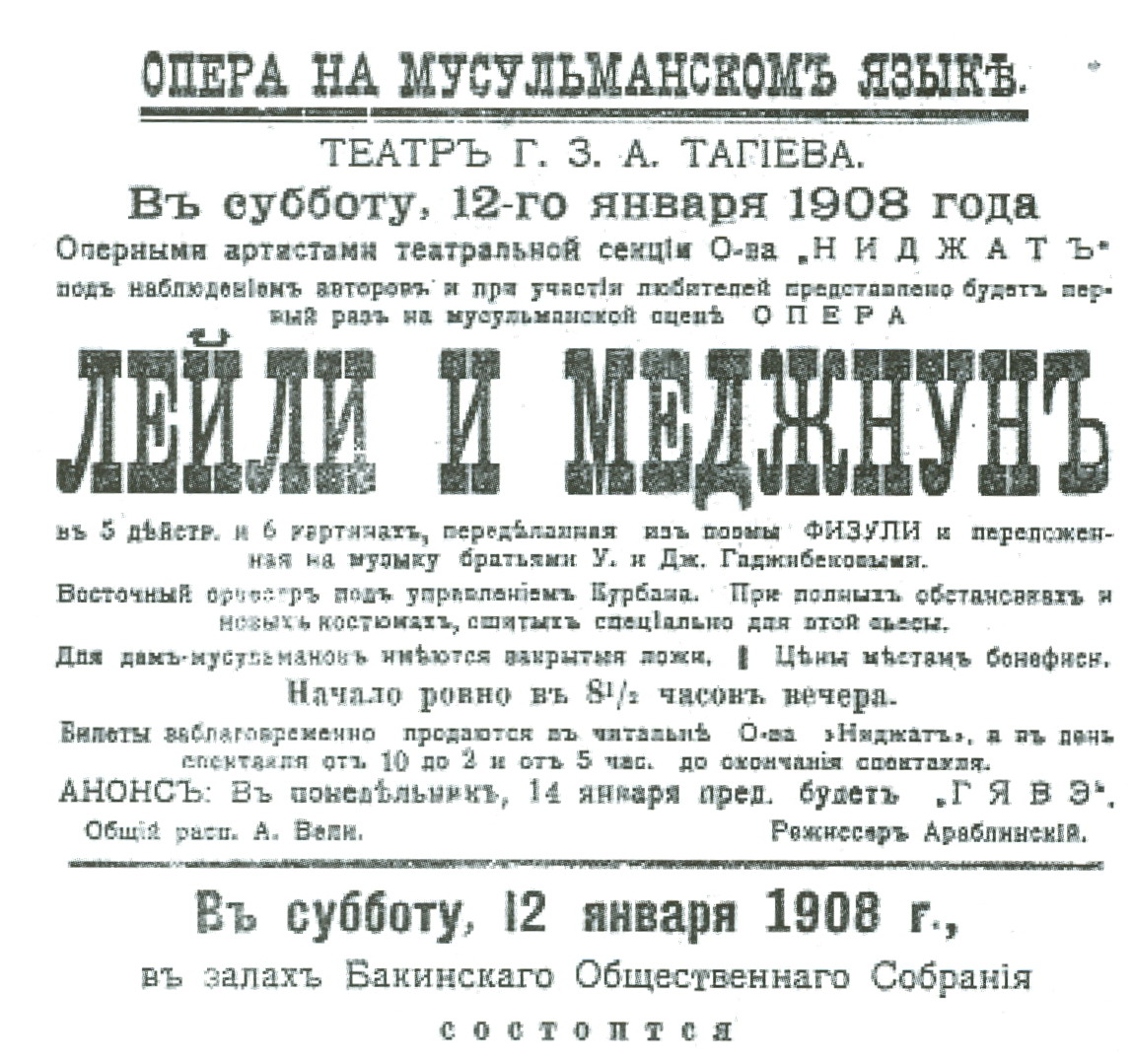
- First poster of Leyli and Majnun
- Native title: Leyli və Məcnun
- Librettist: Uzeyir Hajibeyov; Jeyhun Hajibeyov
- Language: Azerbaijani
- Based on: Layla and Majnun
- Premiere: 25 January 1908; Taghiyev Theatre, Baku

Leyli and Majnun (Azerbaijani: Leyli və Məcnun) is an opera in four acts by Uzeyir Hajibeyov, to an Azerbaijani libretto written by the composer and his brother Jeyhun Hajibeyov. The opera was first performed in Baku in 1908.

== Performance history ==
It was written in 1907 and first performed on 25 January [O.S. 12 January] 1908 at the Taghiyev Theatre in Baku, which was then part of the Russian Empire. The opera is considered the first opera of the Muslim East.

The first performance of the opera was led by Huseyn Arablinski and Hajibeyov himself played violin.

Uzeyir Hajibeyov and his brother Jeyhun Hajibeyov wrote the libretto for the opera based on Azerbaijani poet Muhammad Fuzuli's poem Layla and Majnun; most parts of the poem remained unchanged.

The opera became a founder of a new genre synthesizing oriental and European musical forms, resembling a dialogue of two musical cultures of East and West.

This opera has been shown more than 2,000 times at the Azerbaijan State Academic Opera and Ballet Theater as well as in other countries, including Russia, Ukraine, Iran, Turkey, Georgia, Uzbekistan and Turkmenistan.

== Roles ==
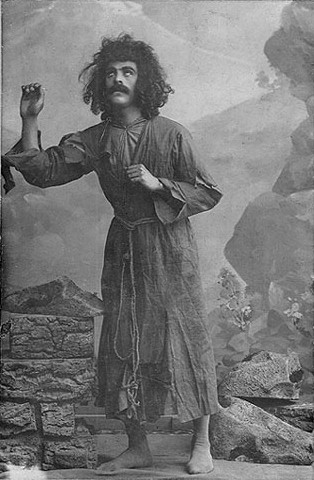
Huseyngulu Sarabski as the first Majnun

Role	Voice type	Premiere cast, 25 January 1908 (Conductor: Abdurrahim bey Hagverdiyev)
Geys (Majnun)	tenor	Huseyngulu Sarabsky
Leyli	soprano	Abdurrahman Farajev
Geys's father	tenor	Mirza Mukhtar Mammadov
Geys's mother	soprano	Mir Mahmud Kazimovsky
Leyli's father	baritone	Imran Gasymov (Kangarli)
Leyli's mother	mezzo-soprano	J. Vazirov
Ibn Salam	tenor	Jeyhun Hajibeyov (Dagestani)
Nofel	baritone	Jeyhun Hajibeyov (Dagestani)
Zeyd	tenor	Imran Gasymov (Kangarli)
The 1st Arab	tenor	Mammadov
The 2nd Arab	tenor	Safarov
Matchmakers, heralds, guests, pupils-girls and boys.

== Synopsis ==
=== Act 1 ===
Scene 1
Boys and girls go out of school. Beautiful Leyli and Geys love each other; they are chatting fondly, forgetting about others. But friends find Leyli's behavior very unethical and hastily take her away. Geys begs her father to marry Leyli to him, without whom he cannot live.

Scene 2
Leyli's parents have heard about Gey's love for Leyli and Leyli's mutual love for him. The girl's mother angrily reproaches her and Leyli listens to her sadly. She does not deny that she loves Geys more than anything in the world.

Geys's father comes to bring in Leyli and Geys together. Leyli's father sharply and decidedly refuses the proposal: he will never marry away his daughter to Majnun (madman) – which is how everybody calls Geys, who becomes crazy due to his love for Leyli.

Knowing about the refusal, Geys frantically curses people and his sad destiny. He seeks loneliness and takes off to the desert.

But Leyli's destiny is solved in another way. Her parents have agreed to her marriage to the wealthy Ibn Salam. Astonished by these news Leyli faints.

=== Act 2 ===
Sorrow changed Geys's mind. He walks in mountains and sands of desert, thinking about Leyli. Majnun's father and friend – Zeyd have found him – but crazy young man hasn't decided them. Emaciated appearance of the anchoret, his uncheerful destiny and his father's sorrow arouses sympathy of Arabs passing through the desert. A commander Nofel shows interest in them. He would like to help unlucky Majnun and sends a herald to Leyli's father.

But even Nofel's intervention has made Leyli's father to change his mind. Then Nofel decides to compel him by force and challenges him to a struggle. Leyli's father asks him for execution and explains the reason of refusal: his daughter Leyli is other person's fiancée.

=== Act 3 ===
The wedding day of Ibn Salam and Leyli comes. Guests are happily feasting, wishing happiness to the newlywed. And at last the newlyweds remain together. Leyli is confused. At this moment Majnun's weak voice is heard, which appears near them as a shadow. Ibn Salam stands still, Leyli faints away. Servants carefully take the madman away.

=== Act 4 ===
Scene 1
There is not happiness in Ibn Salam's house. Leyli is ill by depression. She confesses to husband that she loves geys and can't love anybody anymore. Let Ibn Salam waits, maybe her feelings to Majnun will pass. Pained Ibn Salam goes away. And suddenly Majnun again appears in front of Leyli as a bodiless shadow. He bitterly complaints to Leyli, that she has betrayed him, destroyed his life, brought sorrow and pain. Forgetting about her illness, Leyli throws herself into her lover's arms, but he doesn't recognize her, he looks for and calls his former, pure lover.

Leyli's heart can't bear it:

I’m happy as long as my beloved one torments me,

If only people wouldn’t call me unfaithful.
I’ve become an idler in this world of separation from you,
Only the hope of joining with you keeps me alive.
Don’t leave me powerless in this bed of sadness,

Hey moon, heal me with the wine of joining.

— Translation from Azerbaijani: Gulnar Aydamirova,

She dies in arms of Ibn Salam.

Scene 2
Mejnun comes to Leyli's grave. Now, Leyli has decided to belong him, now they will be together forever. Desperated, Majnun falls on the lover's grave and dies.
