= Uzeyir Hajibeyov =

Azerbaijani composer and musicologist (1885–1948)

- عزیر حاجی‌بگوف
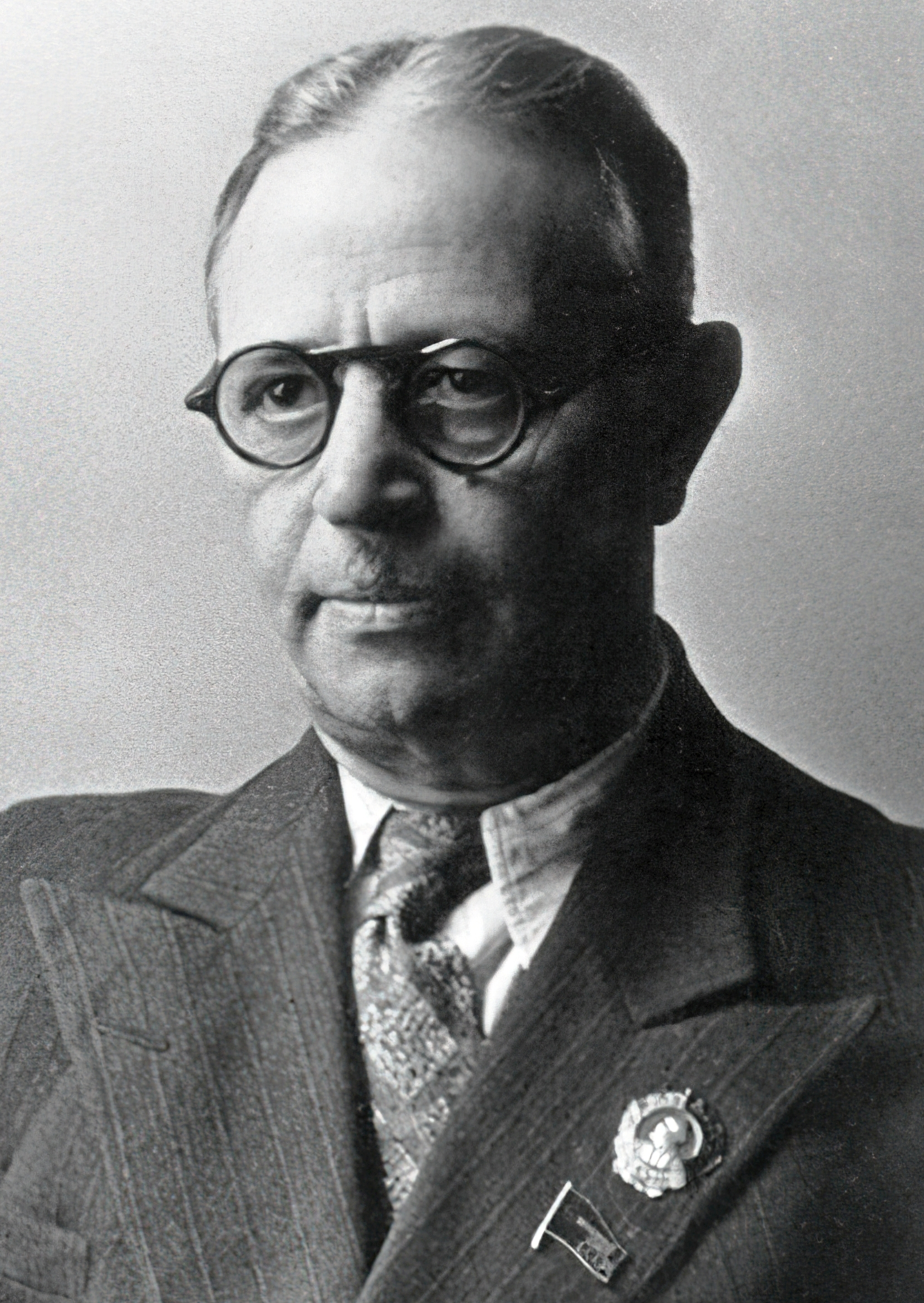
- Born: 18 September 1885; Aghjabadi, Elizavetpol Governorate, Russian Empire
- Died: 23 November 1948 (aged 63); Baku, Azerbaijan SSR, Soviet Union
- Resting place: Alley of Honor
- Education: Transcaucasian Teachers Seminary
- Occupations: Composer; musicologist; teacher
- Notable work: National anthem of Azerbaijan; Leyli and Majnun; Arshin Mal Alan
- Title: Rector of the Azerbaijan State Conservatoire
- Father: Abdulhuseyn bey Hajibeyli
- Honours: People's Artiste of the Azerbaijan SSR

Uzeyir bey Abdulhuseyn bey oghlu Hajibeyov (Note: Azerbaijani: عزیر بگ عبدالحسین بگ اوغلی حاجی‌بگوف, romanized: Üzeyir bəy Əbdülhüseyn bəy oğlu Hacıbəyov, cyrillized: Үзејир бәј Әбдүлһүсејн бәј оғлу Һаҹыбәјов, pronounced [yzeˈiɾ bæj‿æbˌdylhyˈsejn bæj‿oɣˈɫu hɑːdʒɯˈbæjof]; Russian: Узеир Абдул-Гусейн оглы Гаджибеков, romanized: Uzeir Abdul-Gusejn ogly Gadžibekov, pronounced [ʊzʲɪˈ(j)ir ɐbˌdulgʊˈsʲejn ɐgˈlɨ gədʐɨˈbʲekəf]) (/(j)ʊˈzeɪ(ə)r ˌhædʒiˈbeɪɒf/; 18 September 1885 – 23 November 1948) was an Azerbaijani composer, musicologist, and teacher. He is recognized as the father of Azerbaijani classical music. He composed the music of the national anthem of Azerbaijan Democratic Republic (which was re-adopted after Azerbaijan regained its independence from the Soviet Union in 1991). Hajibeyov also composed the anthem used by Azerbaijan during the Soviet period. He was the first composer of an opera in the Islamic world. He composed the first oriental opera Leyli and Majnun in 1908 and since then he is revered for adapting the written masterpiece to the theatre.

== Early life ==
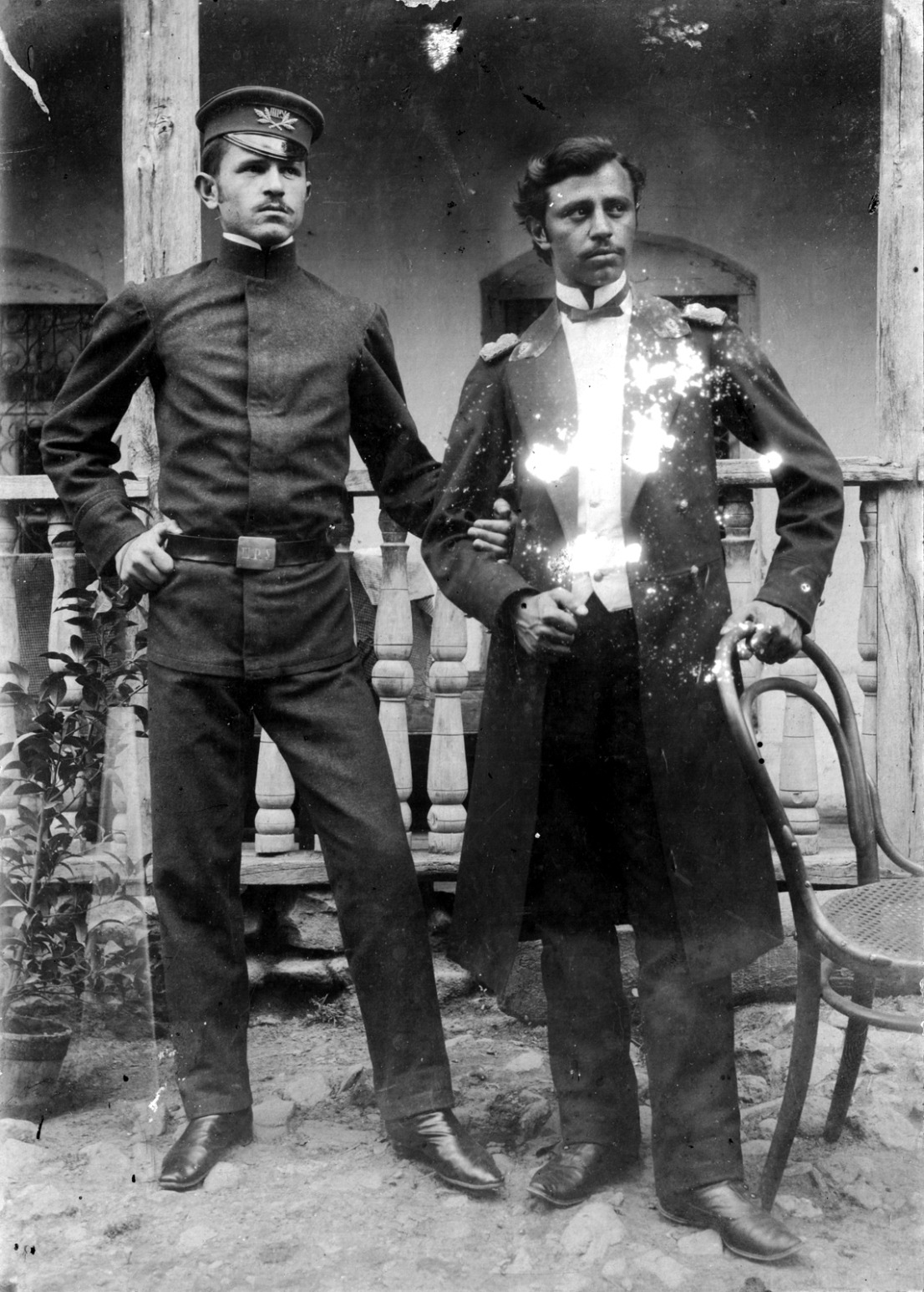
Uzeyir (right) with his brother Jeyhun Hajibeyli (left), 1908

Uzeyir Hajibeyov was born in Aghjabadi, near Shusha of Azerbaijan, on 18 September 1885. His father, Abdulhuseyn bey Hajibeyli, was the secretary to Khurshidbanu Natavan for many years, and his mother, Shirin, grew up in the Natavan household. Growing up, Hajibeyov was strongly influenced by Natavan's work.

Shusha, often dubbed as the cradle of Azerbaijani music and culture, had a reputation for its musical heritage. The town was also referred to as "the Music Conservatory of the Caucasus" because of its many talented musicians and singers. And the fact that Hajibeyov grew up in Shusha explains how at 22, in 1908, with very little formal musical education, he was capable of writing a full-length opera. Hajibeyov received his early education in a religious school (madrasah), where he perfected his Arabic and Persian. Later he studied at a two-year Russian-Azerbaijani school. Here, with the help of his favorite teacher Mirza Mehdi Hasanzadeh, he familiarized himself with the heritage of the famous classic writers of the East and the West. The richness of the musical performance tradition of Shusha greatly influenced the musical education of Hajibeyov. He would later reflect on his experiences: "The first musical education I got as a child in Shusha came from the best singers and saz-players. At that time I sang mughams and tasnifs. The singers liked my voice. They would make me sing and teach me at the same time." Uzeyir Hajibeyov's first teacher was his uncle Aghalar Aliverdibeyov, an excellent connoisseur of Azeri folk music. In 1897–1898, when Azerbaijani playwright Abdurrahim bey Hagverdiyev and singer Jabbar Garyaghdioglu staged the episode Majnun on Leyli's grave from Layla and Majnun, 13-year-old Uzeyir sang in the choir.

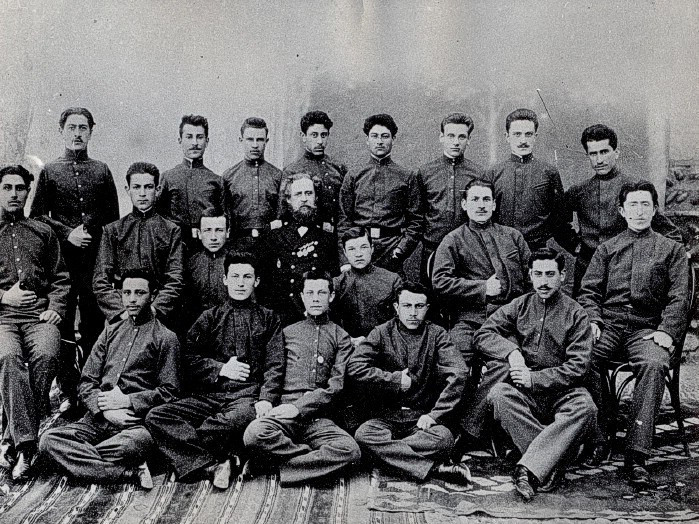
Students of Gori (Transcaucasian) Teachers Seminary; Hajibeyov can be seen on the left of the first row.

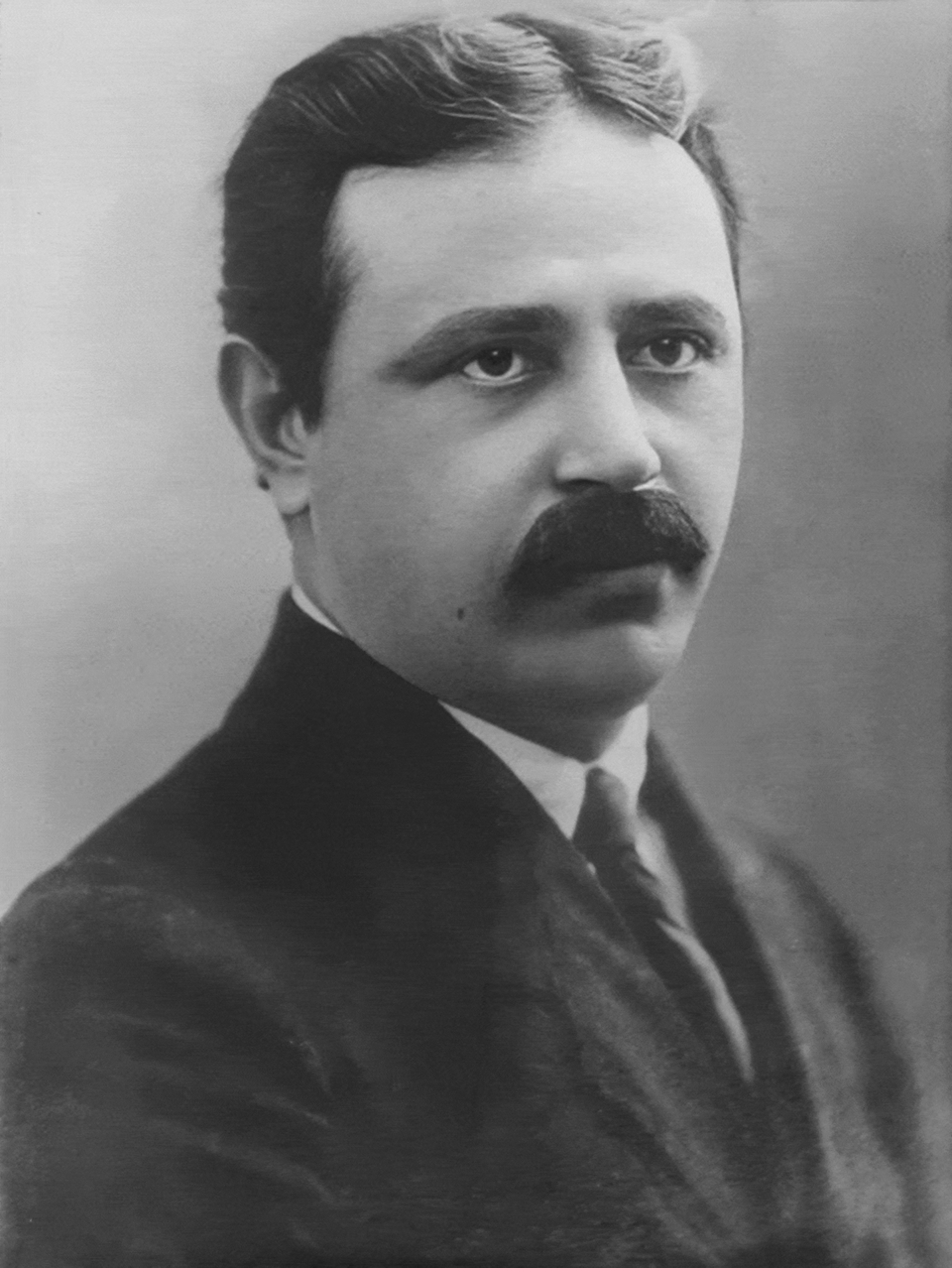
Hajibeyov in 1924

From 1899 to 1904 Hajibeyov studied at the Gori Pedagogical Seminary, later to be known as the Transcaucasian Teachers Seminary. There, along with general education, he also acquired music. In this school, Hajibeyov learned to play the violin, the cello and brass instruments. After his graduation from the Pedagogical Seminary, Hajibeyov was appointed a teacher to the village of Hadrut in Upper Karabakh. Having worked there for a year, Hajibeyov permanently settled in Baku, where he carried on his career in teaching mathematics, geography, history, Azerbaijani and Russian languages, and music. He wrote the Turkic-Russian and Russian-Turkic Dictionary of Political, Legal, Economic and Military Terms, Used in Press in 1907 and the textbook Arithmetic Problems in 1908, and had them published by the Orujov Brothers Publishing House in Baku.

Hajibeyov was no stranger to the tragic chaos of war; he lived through the Revolutions of 1905 and 1917, the fall of the Democratic Republic of Azerbaijan in 1920, and both World Wars. The political repercussions of these military conquests often manifested in other forms of chaos. For example, between 1920 and 1940, the alphabet systems for writing Azerbaijani were changed three times – from Arabic to Latin, and from Latin to Cyrillic – a process which greatly hindered and interrupted the educational and cultural process, and may well have been one of the factors influencing Hajibeyov to present his ideas verbally on the musical stage.

== Merging traditional and Western styles ==
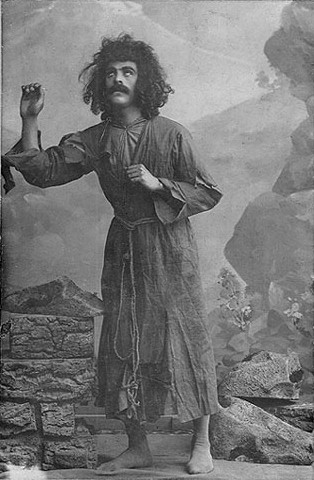
Huseyngulu Sarabski as the first Majnun in the opera Leyli and Majnun (Baku, 1908)

Throughout all the tumultuous change in Azerbaijan that took place between 1900 and 1940, one characteristic consistently reflects the character of Hajibeyov. He always searched for ways to merge and integrate the past with the present, rather than to discard either form. Rather curiously, even files at the Gori Pedagogical Seminary have shown his persistence in holding on to his own roots even under pressure. On 3 December 1900, when he was 15, it is noted that "the student, Uzeyir Hajibeyov, was rebuked because he was talking in his native language." Conversely, when Russian-influenced musicians tried to ban traditional Azerbaijani instruments like the tar, zurna and kamancha, Hajibeyov and his colleagues pushed to incorporate them into the Western orchestra, thereby, giving them an even higher status and ultimately a chance to survive. Hajibeyov had the opportunity to open music schools that combined various educational systems. In these schools, national cadres who could integrate into the world music culture were trained. The history and music theory of Azerbaijani music were researched, and education classes were written. Hajibeyov in the field of music education combined and created in Azerbaijan Western and East traditions.

== Music ==
In 1908, Hajibeyov wrote his first opera, Leyli and Majnun, based on the tragic love story by the 15th century poet Fuzuli. This would be the first of 7 operas and 3 musical comedies that Hajibeyov would compose throughout his life. In Leyli and Majnun, the uniqueness of the traditional modal music of mugham was incorporated into a Western genre with the use of instruments indigenous to both traditions.

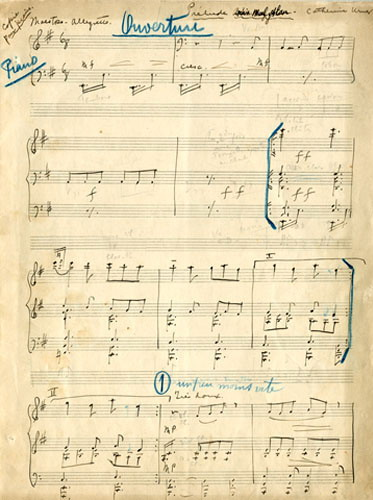
Hajibeyov's manuscript of Arshin Mal Alan, written in 1913

Hajibeyov's second opera, Sheikh Sanan, was written in 1909 in a form that was entirely opposite to the first. This time Hajibeyov employed a purely European style. Sheikh Sanan received raves as a musical composition, but the content was too progressive for the period. In this opera, Hajibeyov advocated that marriage should not be bound by nationality or religion – in essence, it was another form of integration. But this time, it backfired. The story line follows a religious sheikh on his way to Mecca who meets a very beautiful Georgian lady. To his horror, the lovely creature's father turns out to be a swineherd, caring for what, to him, was a forbidden animal. In the end, the sheikh denounces his religion to win the woman. It is said that when the opera was performed, many people were offended and walked out, leaving Hajibeyov with the realization that he had outpaced his generation too much this time. As a result, he made a drastic decision and burned the score. When asked by Ramazan Khalilov, his assistant, how he could do that, Hajibeyov replied: "I didn't destroy my opera. It's my own creation, so it's always in my head." Khalilov said that Hajibeyov went on to use this same magnificent music 27 years later to create Koroghlu, an opera that many acclaim to be his finest.

In contrast to Sheikh Sanan, Hajibeyov's operas Rustam and Sohrab (1910), Asli and Karam (1912), Shah Abbas and Khurshid Banu (1912), and Harun and Leyli (1915) were entirely based on Azerbaijani folk music elements, primarily mugham.

In October 2006, the musical comedy Arshin Mal Alan (The Cloth Peddler) by Hajibeyov, written in 1914, was announced to be performed on western stages for the first time.

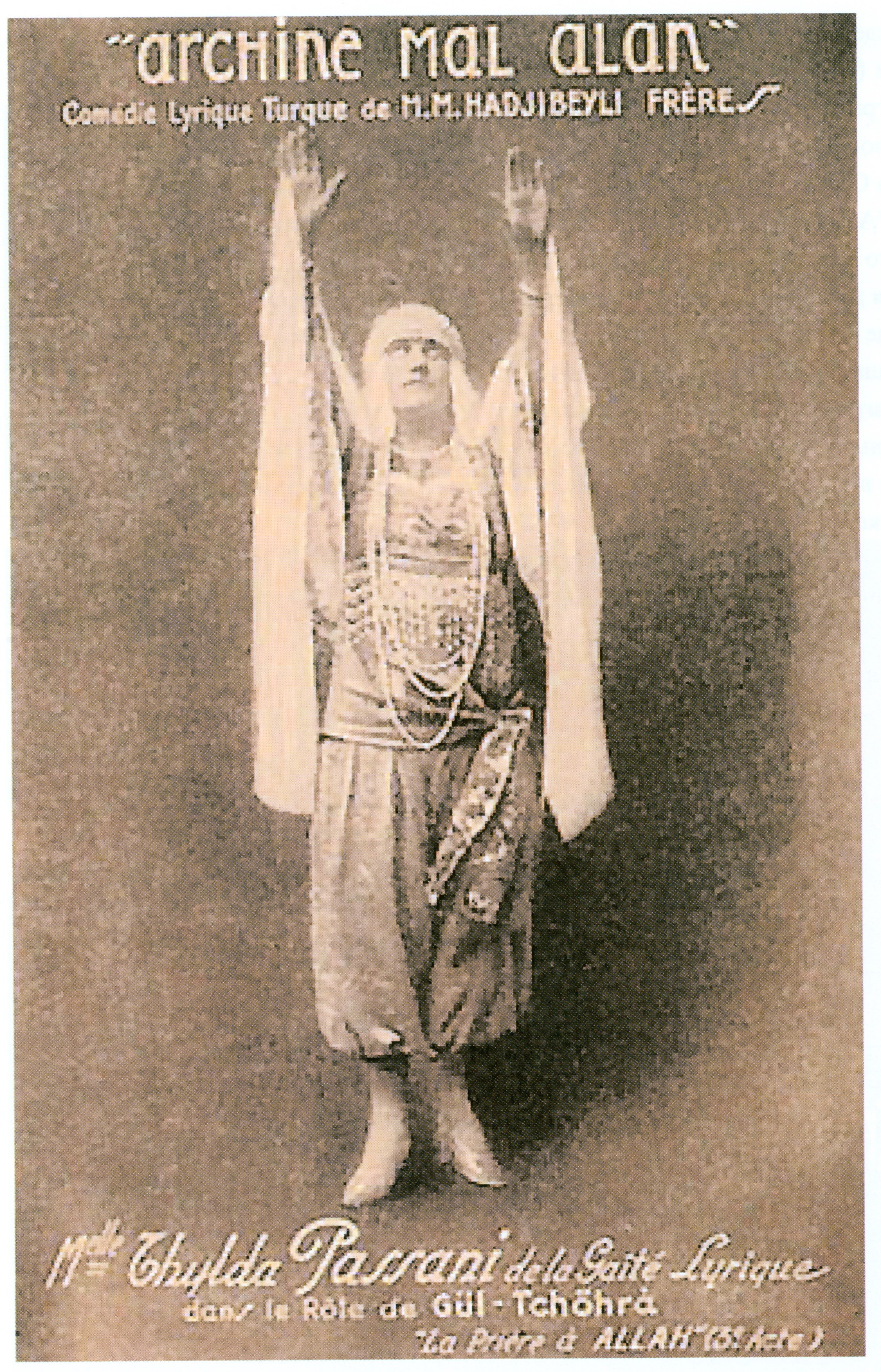
A poster of Arshin Mal Alan at Femina Theatre of Paris in 1925

One of Hajibeyov's greatest legacies was bringing forward the idea of establishing a professional music school. Hence, the Baku Academy of Music (known then as the Azerbaijan State Conservatoire), was founded in 1920 and named after Hajibeyov after his death. The school has trained Azerbaijan's finest composers such as Gara Garayev, Fikrat Amirov, Jovdat Hajiyev, Soltan Hajibeyov, Tofig Guliyev, and Vagif Mustafazade. His statue sits in front of this grand building that is still devoted to the synthesizing Eastern and Western musical traditions.

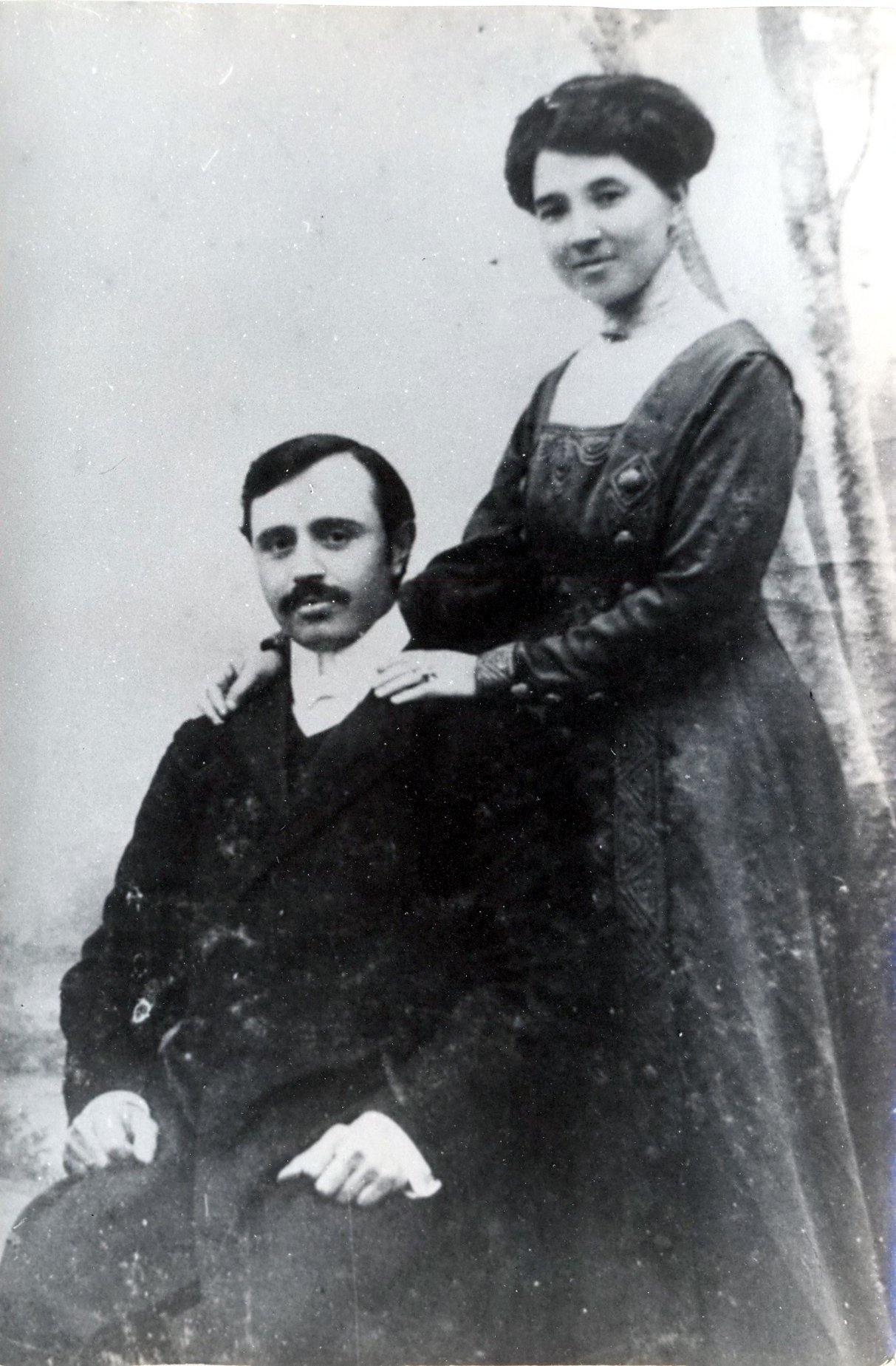
Hajibeyov with his wife Maleyke

In 1931, Hajibeyov helped in establishing the Azeri Folk Instruments Orchestra affiliated with the Radio Committee. This orchestra performed European classical pieces, such as those by Mikhail Glinka, Wolfgang Amadeus Mozart, Franz Schubert, Georges Bizet and others. Hajibeyov thus was the first musician to adapt the note system to traditional Azerbaijani musical instruments.

In 1936, Hajibeyov assisted in the founding of the Azerbaijani State Choir within the Azerbaijan Philharmonic Society. One of the most serious problems he faced was the mono-voiced repertoire of Azerbaijani folk songs, which allowed harmonization to distort style of the song and, on occasion, even alter the melody line when it changed modes. Hajibeyov resolved this problem by using contrapuntal polyphony and unison-doubling rather than four-part singing in the problematic sections.

Hajibeyov devoted much energy to the idea of integrating woman's role and status into the male-dominated world. The concept of women's emancipation runs through many of his works, often in the form of comedy or satirization, as in the case when he makes fun of the process of selecting marriage partners, a process hindered by the fact that women were still wearing veils until the 1920s when the Soviet regime prohibited them.

=== Operas ===
==== Leyli and Majnun ====
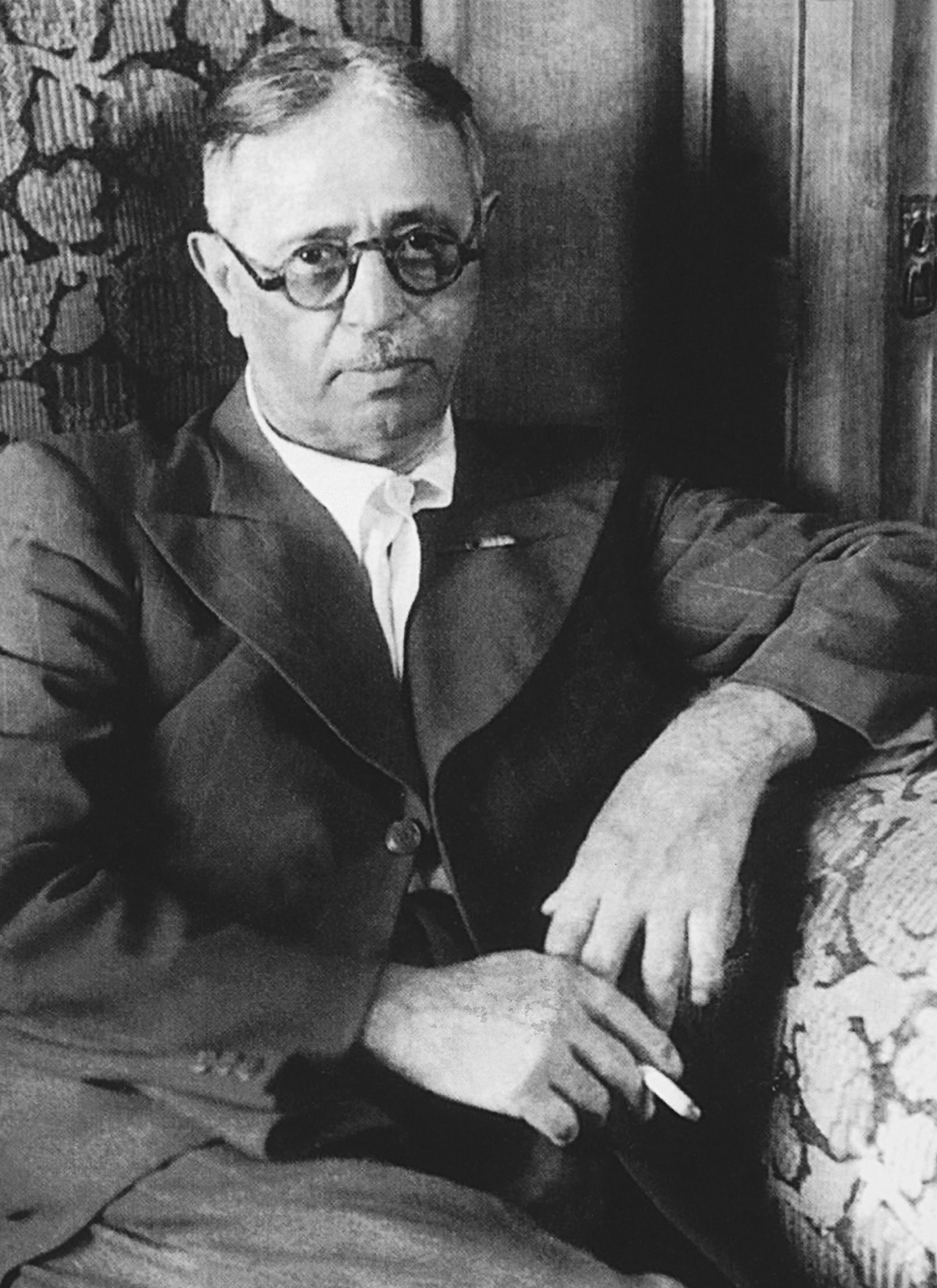
Hajibeyov in the 1940s

The opera art was established art not only in Azerbaijan, but also in the entire Muslim East by means of Hacibeyov's opera "Leyli and Majnun" which premiered on 12 January 1908, at the theatre of Haji Zeynalabdin Taghiyev. Hajibeyov wrote with his brother Jeyhun Hajibeyli this libretto of the opera based on a poem of the same name written by Fuzuli. The first performance was made by actor and director Huseyn Arablinski. The band-master was the writer-dramatist Abdurrahim bey Hagverdiyev. Huseynqulu Sarabski was in the role of Majnun and Abdurrahim Farajov in the role of Leyli. In subsequent performances, Hajibeyov himself and his close friend and colleague, composer Muslim Magomayev, performed as band-master.

This role was acted for the first time by Huseyinqulu Sarablinski. Then, these people – Sidghi Ruhulla, Khanlar Hakhverdiev, Aliovsat Sadigov, Shirzad Huseynov, Gulagha Mammadov, Mais Salmanov, Gulu Asgerov, Bakir Hashimov, Ali Mehdiyev, Arif Babayev, Baba Mirzaev, Janali Akbarov, Safa Gahramanov, Alim Gasimov and Mansum Ibrahimov performed in a role of Majnun at the next performance.

==== Koroghlu ====
Koroghlu opera premiered on 30 April 1937 at the Azerbaijan Opera and Ballet Theatre. This is the first classical opera that based on the motives of heroic epic in Azerbaijan. In this opera, Hajibeyov created arias, mass choral scenes, various ensembles, ballet numbers and recitatives.

In the next years of his life, he worked on Firuza opera.

=== Musical comedies ===
==== Husband and Wife ====
The first musical comedy of Hajibeyov is Husband and Wife which consists of three scenes. This is the first example of Azerbaijani musical comedy. The first premiere of it was in 1910. H. Sarabski and A. Aghdamski performed in the roles of Marjan and Minnat. Hajibeyov wrote the sketch of the comedy himself.

==== If Not That One, Then This One ====
After Husband and Wife opera, he began to write his second operetta. The premiere was at the theatre of Mailovs brothers in Baku in 1911. "Mən nə qədər qoca olsam da" song and "Uzundere" national folk music are sounded in this opera with some changes on it.

Later, this opera was translated into various languages, performed in Caucasian countries, Turkey, Bulgaria and other countries.

==== Arshin Mal Alan ====
The first feature film based on Arshin Mal Alan musical comedy was shot in 1916. This film was the silent film.

For the next time it was screened at Baku Movie Studio in 1945 with some changes. The main role of the film belonged to Rashid Behbudov.

This comedy again was screened in Baku, in 1965. The director of the film was Tofiq Taghizade and Fikrat Amirov performed as a music redactor. It was translated into many languages such as English, German, Chinese, Arabic, Persian, Polish etc.

== Publications ==
From 1919 to 1920 Hajibeyov served as editor-in-chief for the newspaper Azerbaijan, the main governmental media body of the Democratic Republic of Azerbaijan.

In 1927, Hajibeyov published Collection of Azerbaijani Folk Songs along with composer Muslim Magomayev. For the first time, more than 300 pieces of Azeri folk music were documented by notation. In 1945, he published the book entitled Principles of Azerbaijan Folk Music, which has been translated into several languages including English in 1985 devoted to the centenary of his birth.

== Legacy ==
In 2013, Google celebrated Hajibeyov's 128th Birthday with Google Doodle on its Azerbaijani version.

=== Official honours ===
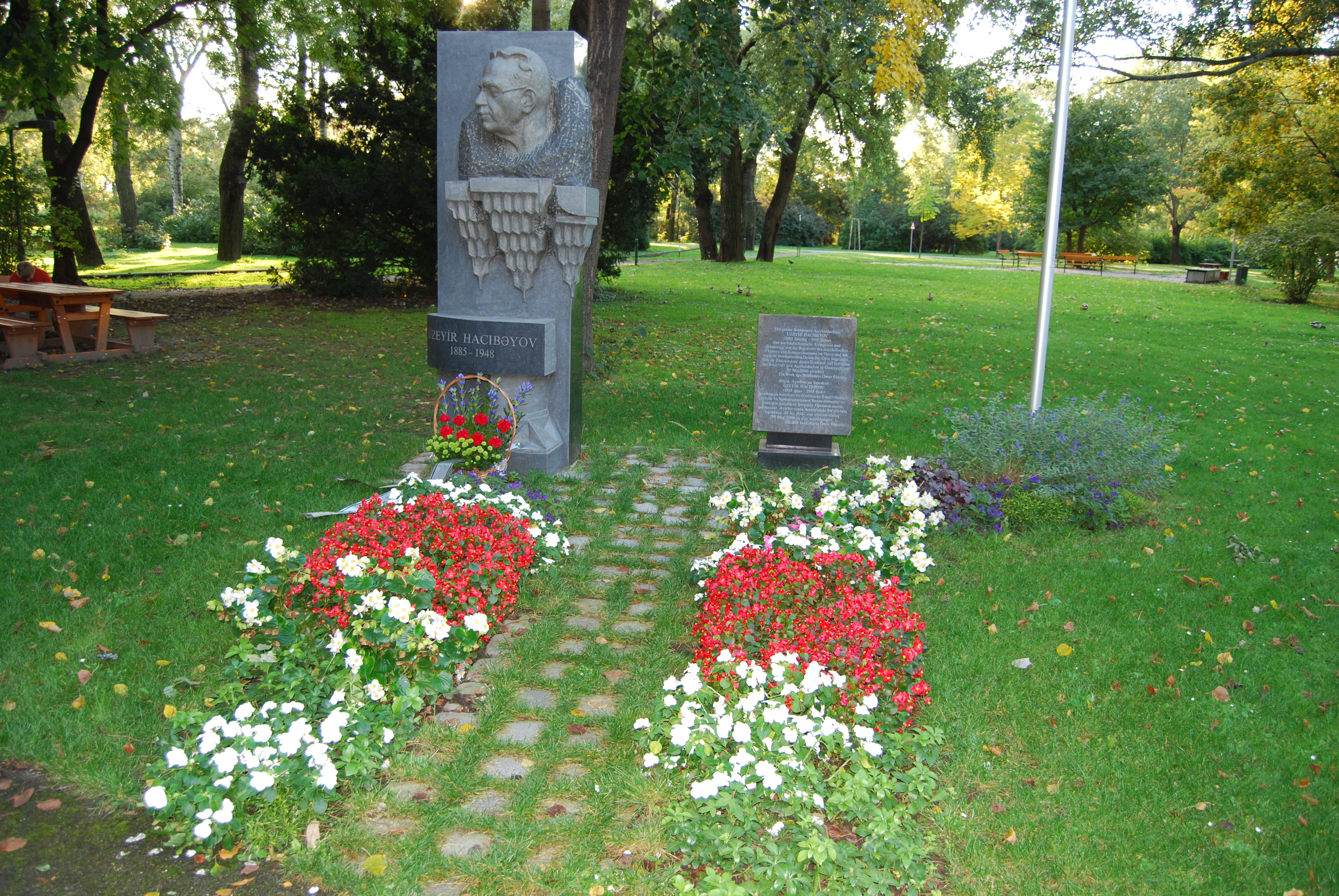
Commemorative stelae in Donaupark, Vienna.

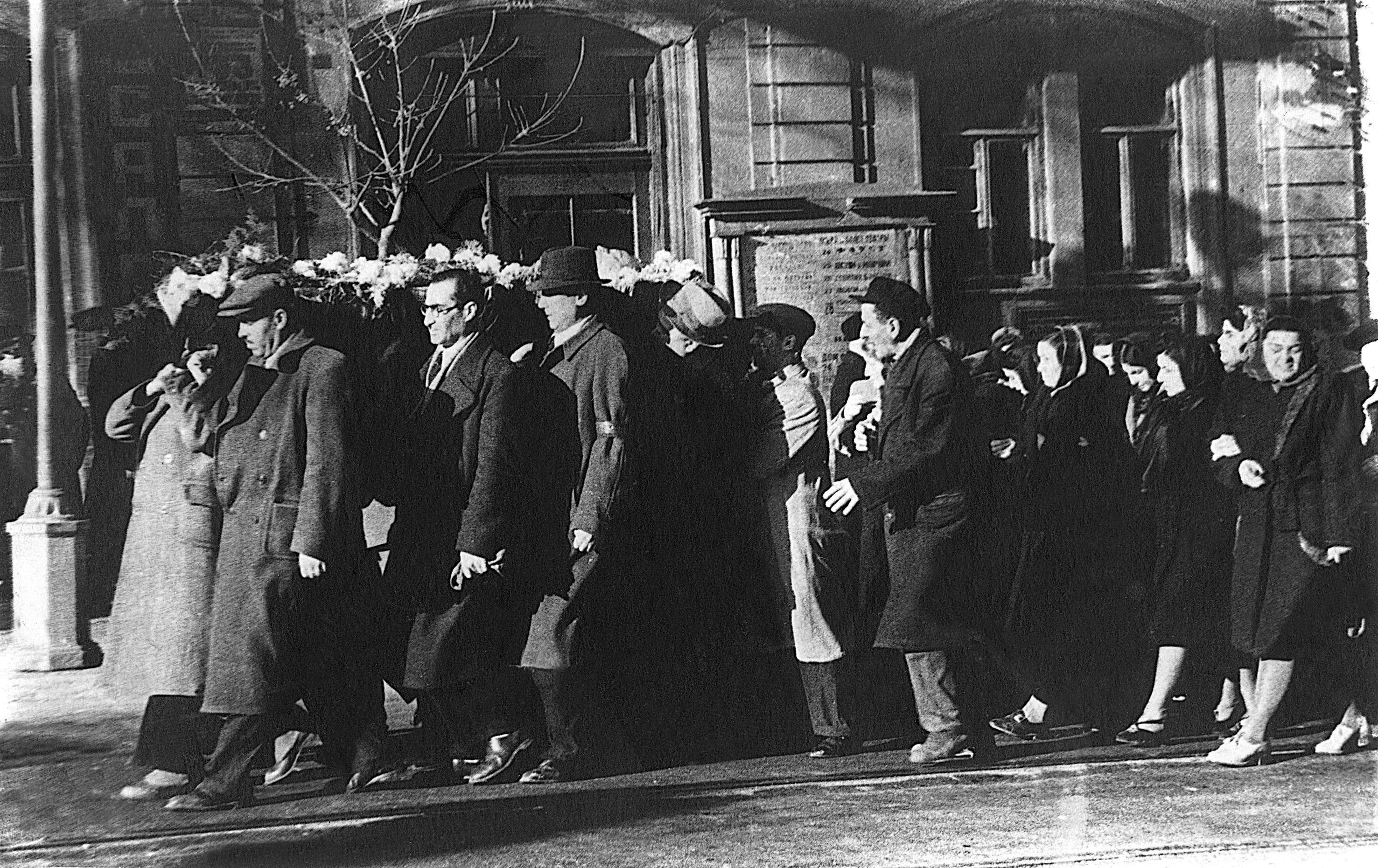
Funeral of Hajibeyov

Hajibeyov was the creator of the first operas and operettas in the Orient. In 1938, he was awarded with the title of People's Artist of the USSR. He was also honored with the Order of Lenin and the Stalin Prize which he won twice, once in 1941 for the opera Koroghlu (1936), and the other time in 1946 for the 1945 film based on his opera Arshin Mal Alan.

Hajibeyov was a professor at the Baku Academy of Music (of which he was also head in 1928–1929 and 1939–1948) and Active Member of the Academy of Sciences of Azerbaijan. For the last 10 years of his life, he was Chairman of the Composers Union of Azerbaijan.

Hajibeyov joined the Communist Party in 1938. He served twice as a deputy of the Supreme Soviet of the Soviet Union, the highest legislative institution in the Union.

Hajibeyov died of diabetes at the age of 63, and was buried at the Alley of Honor in Baku.

On 18 September 1995, the 110th anniversary of Hajibeyov's birth has been celebrated. No one in the history of modern music in Azerbaijan is recognized for having done more to lay the foundation for Azerbaijani music as it exists today, especially with its unique synthesis of Eastern and Western traditional musical instruments and musical forms.

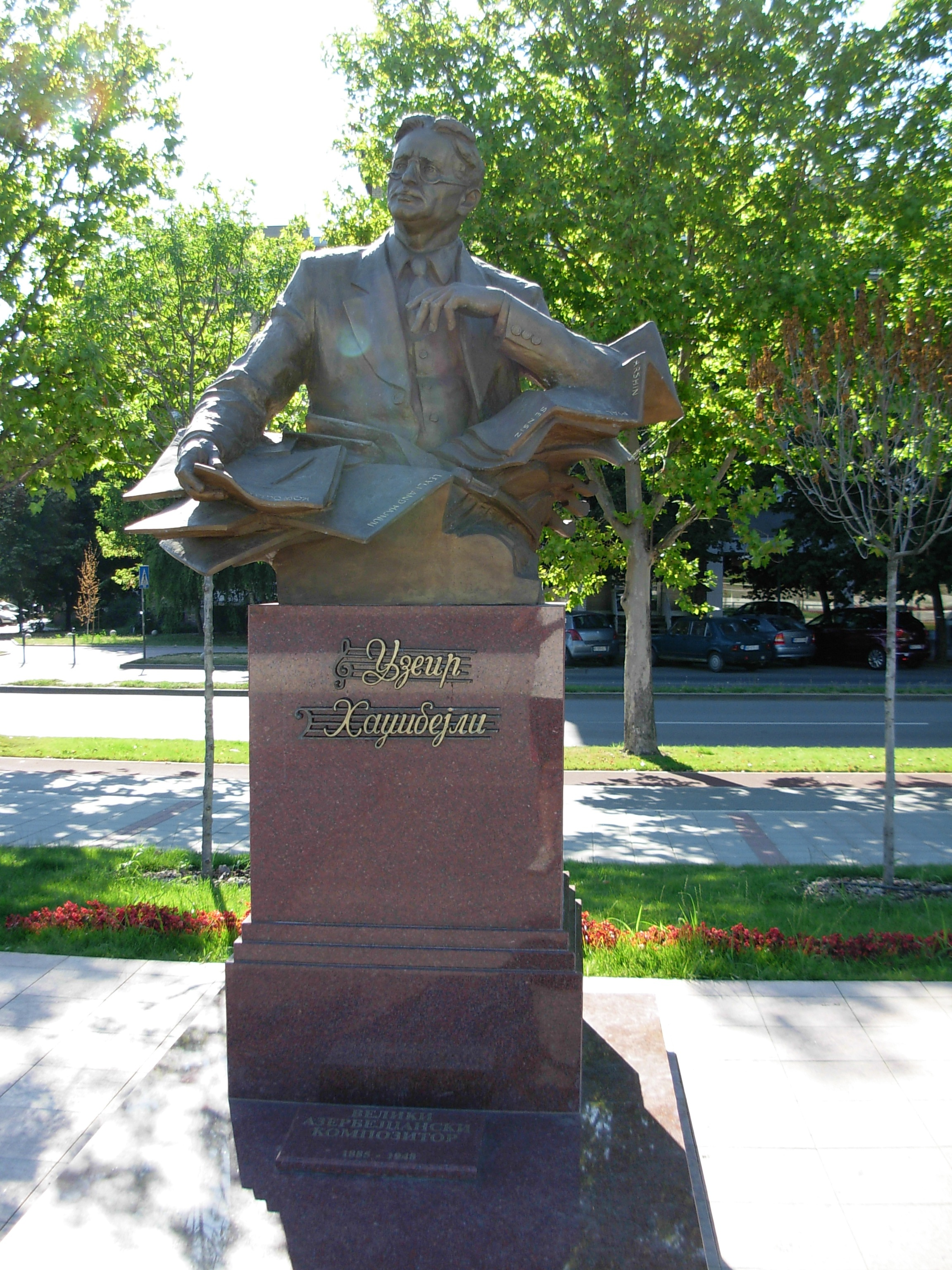
Monument to Hajibeyov, in Novi Sad, Serbia

In 2008, the National Bank of Azerbaijan minted a 100 manat gold commemorative coin dedicated to Hajibeyov's memory.

In June 2011 President of Azerbaijan Ilham Aliyev and President of Serbia Tadic unveiled a monument of Hajibeyov on the Dunavski kej in Novi Sad, Serbia.

On the occasion of the 130th birthday anniversary of the composer, Los Angeles Mayor Eric Garcetti proclaimed 18 September 2015 as the "Uzeyir Hajibeyli Memorial Day" in the City of Los Angeles and called on all residents to join this celebration. Also U.S. Congressman Paul Gosar from Arizona extended a Congressional Record recognizing Hajibeyov's achievements.

=== Uzeyir Music Day ===
18 September is celebrated as "Uzeyir Music Day" after national leader Heydar Aliyev's decree in 1995. Different events and celebrations are usually held on this day with participation of world-famous musicians.

== Stage works ==
- Leyli and Majnun, opera, 1908.
- Sheikh Sanan, opera, 1909. Destroyed by the composer.
- Husband and Wife, operetta, 1910.
- O olmasın, bu olsun (If Not That One, Then This One). Musical comedy (operetta) in four acts, 1910
- Rustam and Zohrab, mugham opera, 1910.
- Asli and Kerem, mugham opera in four acts and six scenes, 1912.
- Shah Abbas and Khurshid Banu, mugham opera, 1912.
- Arshin Mal Alan (The Cloth Peddler). Musical comedy (operetta), 1913.
- Harun and Leyla, mugham opera, 1915
- Koroghlu (The Blind Man's Son), opera. Written 1936, premiered 1937.
- "Chirpynirdi gara deniz" ("The Black Sea raged"), song. Written 1918.
- "Yaxşı yol" ("Farewell"), Soviet march.
