= Huseyngulu Sarabski =

Azerbaijani opera singer (1879–1945)

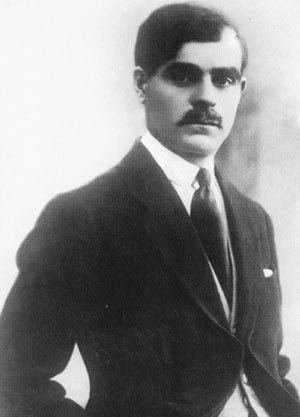
- Huseyngulu Sarabski

Background information
- Born: March 20, 1879; Baku, Russian Empire
- Died: February 16, 1945 (aged 65) Baku, Azerbaijan SSR, Soviet Union
- Genres: Opera, folk
- Years active: 1902 – 1930s

Huseyngulu Sarabski (Azerbaijani: Hüseynqulu Sarabski), born Hüseynqulu Malik oğlu Rzayev (20 March 1879 – 16 February 1945), was an Azerbaijani opera singer (tenor), composer, playwright, stage actor, theatre director, and musician (tar).

== Early life ==
Sarabski was born to poor parents in Baku, Russian Empire (now capital of Azerbaijan) on Nowruz eve. At a young age, he was sent to a mullah to study the Koran. Unable to overcome the language barrier and having received severe beatings from the mullah, Huseyngulu managed to convince his parents to let him quit. In 1891, at the age 12, he watched a theatrical performance for the first time. It was staged by amateur actors and called Khan Sarabi adapted from Mirza Fatali Akhundov's play Sarguzasht-i vazir-i Khan-i Lankaran. Young Huseyngulu enjoyed the performance and later chose the pseudonym Sarabski reflecting on his first encounter with theatre. As a teenager, he enrolled in Russian night courses for the poor funded by Zeynalabdin Taghiyev. Before becoming a prominent actor, he had been making a living through smithery, stone dressing and blue collar work.

== Career in theatre ==
Sarabski's first role was that of Rasul in Nariman Narimanov's Dilin balasi. He later acted in dramatic pieces by various Azeri and Western European authors, but it was not until his role in Almansor by Heinrich Heine where his incredible performance of the Hijaz-i Arabi mugham was noticed by composer Uzeyir Hajibeyov leading to Sarabski choosing a career in musical theatre. In 1908, he was assigned the primary role of Majnun in Hajibeyov's opera Leyli and Majnun (which was also the first Azeri and the first Oriental opera in history). In the next 30 years of his career he would perform Majnun in this opera about 400 times. Starting from 1914, a troupe led by Sarabski and conductor (and future composer) Muslim Magomayev went on tours to Tiflis, Elisabethpol, Erivan, Vladikavkaz, Tabriz, Rasht, and Teheran to perform Leyli and Majnun and other pieces in front of the local audiences. Back in Baku, the staging was carried out weekly. Between 1923 and 1926 he founded a theatre troupe in Shamakhi and a dramatic theatre in Aghdam.

== Other contributions ==
Before 1918, Sarabski wrote three plays entitled Jahalat (Ignorance), Akhtaran tapar (He who searches will find) and Na dograrsan gashina, o chixar gashigina (What goes around, comes around) and had them staged by both amateur and professional troupes. Sarabski composed lieder "'Mughan" and "Bizim daghlar", as well as the children's song "Ay-ay".

In 1936–1937 he wrote a book called Kohna Baki ("Old Baku") where along with historical and ethnographic information, he included the history of the city's rich musical traditions. Between 1940 and 1942, Sarabski taught opera and mugham at the Azerbaijan State Conservatoire. Some of his students like Sara Gadimova and Shovkat Alakbarova went on to become prominent Azerbaijani singers.

== Death ==
Sarabski died from esophageal cancer in 1945 and was buried at the Alley of Honor in Baku. On his deathbed, when he was only able to communicate through writing, he was visited by opera singer Hagigat Rzayeva (whom he had had as a stage partner for 15 years), and asked her to sing an aria from Leyli and Majnun. Following her singing, he added to his will that he would like a piece from that opera to play during his funeral with Rzayeva singing while his body was laid into the grave.

== See also ==
- List of People's Artistes of the Azerbaijan SSR
