= Opera in Azerbaijan =

Music genre

Opera in Azerbaijan has a history dating back to the 19th century Russian Empire.

== History ==
=== 19th and early 20th centuries. Russian Empire ===
The emergence of opera and ballet in Azerbaijan is associated with the Imperial Russian period of history when the inhabitants populating what is now the Republic of Azerbaijan became exposed to European music traditions first-hand. The very first documented performance of an opera in Baku took place in May 1889 when Alexey Verstovsky's opera Askold's grave was staged at a circus arena in Baku (on the site of the current Azerbaijan Carpet Museum building), accompanied by the folk choir of Dmitry Agrenev-Slavyanski.

In the early 1900s, opera troupes toured Baku on a yearly basis (except 1901 and 1913), featuring prominent singers of the time such as Natalia Ermolenko-Yuzhina and Antonina Nezhdanova.

The Opera Theater in Baku was built in 1911 on the request of the Armenian Mailov brothers and by Armenian architect Nikolai Bayev.

=== 20th century. Azerbaijani opera ===
The first opera by an Azerbaijani composer premiered three years earlier, in 1908.

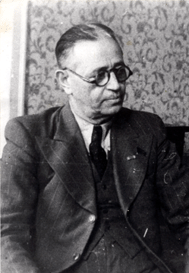
Uzeyir Hajibeyov, founder of Azerbaijani opera

Leyli and Majnun (1908) by Uzeyir Hajibeyov was the first creation in the opera genre not only in Azerbaijan, but also in the whole Muslim world. It was followed by the operas Sheikh Sanan (1909), Rustam and Zohrab (1910), Shah Abbas and Khurshid Banu (1912), Asli and Karam (1912) and Harun and Leyla (1915) which were written, but never staged. The Cloth Peddler musical comedy written in 1913 was Hajibeyov's most popular operetta. It is considered to be the most well-known work of Hajibeyov in the former Soviet Union. The Cloth Peddler was translated into Russian, Tatar, Chagatai, Persian and Turkish soon after its premiere in 1913. Later this operetta was translated into Polish, Bulgarian, Chinese, Arabic, French and other languages.

In 1921, Hajibeyov became a member of a council for the development of Azerbaijani theaters and contributed to the improvement of stage arts of Azerbaijan. In 1925, Hajibeyov merged Russian and Azerbaijani opera troupes in a single troupe and created the permanent company of the Opera and Ballet Theater of Azerbaijan. In 1932, Hajibeyov wrote Koroghlu, which was first staged in 1937.

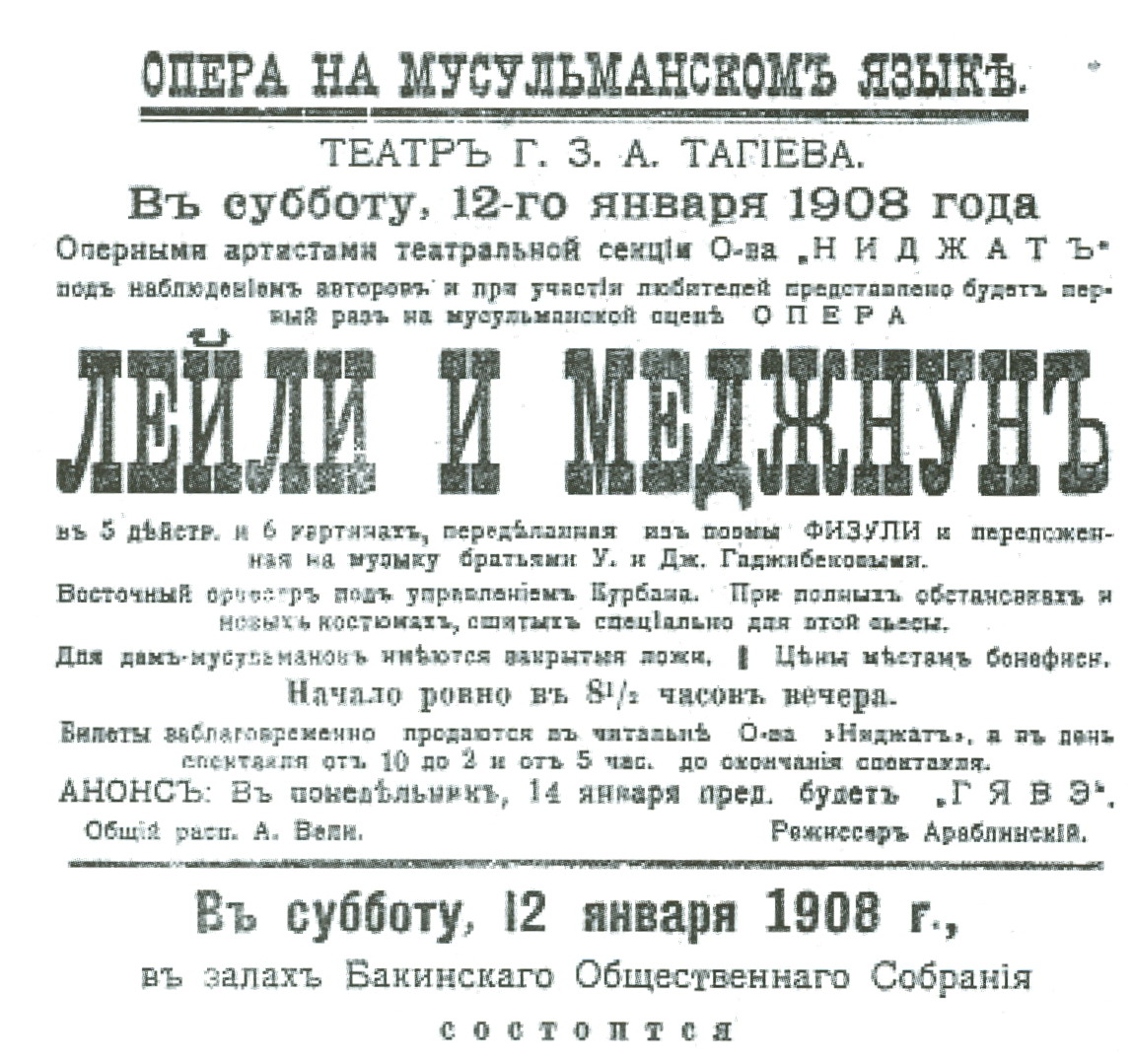
First poster of Leyli and Majnun, first Azerbaijani opera

In 1935 Muslim Magomayev composed Nargiz (1935) and Reinhold Glière composed Shahsanam. The success of these operas encouraged other composers to create operas. In the 1940s, operas such as Khosrow and Shirin by Niyazi, Vatan ("Motherland") by Jovdat Hajiyev and Gara Garayev, Nizami by Afrasiyab Badalbeyli and many other operas were written and staged. The opera Sevil written by Fikrat Amirov premiered in 1953 and a remake of this opera was staged in 1998.

In 1972, Shafiga Akhundova was the first Azerbaijani female composer and the first such in the Muslim world to write an opera. Ballets by foreign and classic composers also are frequently staged at the Azerbaijan Opera and Ballet Theater. Operas created by various Azerbaijani composers such as Akhundova (Galin Gayasi), Suleyman Alasgarov (Bahadur and Sona, Faded Flowers), Jahangir Jahangirov (Life of a Composer, Azad), Vasif Adigozalov (The Dead), Ramiz Mustafayev (Vagif), Zakir Baghirov (Aygun), Nazim Aliverdibeyov (Jirtdan) and others were staged throughout the modern history of Azerbaijani opera.

Prominent Azerbaijani opera singers include Bulbul, Shovkat Mammadova, Fatma Mukhtarova, Huseyngulu Sarabski, Hagigat Rzayeva, Rashid Behbudov, Rauf Atakishiyev, Franghiz Ahmadova, Muslim Magomayev, Lutfiyar Imanov, Fidan and Khuraman Gasimovas, Rubaba Muradova, and Zeynab Khanlarova.

== Mugham opera ==
In 1908 (January, 12), the first mugham opera staged at the theater of Zeynalabdin Taghiyev was a great success. Famous classic story and mugham were joined in this opera. Leyli and Majnun became the first mugham opera in Azerbaijan. Zulfugar Hajibayov Ashig Garib (1916) and Shah Ismayil by Muslum Magomayev (1916) are significant examples of this genre. This tradition was continued by composers in the second half of the 20th century. Shafiga Akhundova's Gəlin qayası (Bride rock) and Jahangir Jahangirov's Xanəndə taleyi (The fate of singer) are examples of operas by these composers.

== Notable operas ==
Operas composed by Azerbaijanis includes:

Uzeyir Hajibeyov:

- Leyli and Majnun, opera, 1908. The first opera from Azerbaijan, the first Muslim opera.
- Rustam and Zohrab, mugham opera, 1910.
- Asli and Kerem, mugham opera in four acts and six scenes, 1912.
- Shah Abbas and Khurshid Banu, mugham opera, 1912.
- Harun and Leyli, mugham opera, 1915
- Firuza, (unfinished)
- Koroğlu ("The Blind Man's Son"), opera, first performed 1938

Zulfugar Hajibeyov:

- Ashiq Qarib ("The Wandering Ashiq"), after the anonymous Azerbaijani romantic dastan of the same name, 1915.

Muslim Magomayev:

- Shah Ismayil, mugham opera 1919, revised 1924, revised 1930.
- Nargiz, 1935.
- Xoruz-bey (unfinished), opera

Afrasiyab Badalbeyli:

- People's punishment
- Golden Key
- Bahadur and Sona
- Aydin
- Nizami, composed 1939, staged 1948.

Fikret Amirov:

- Ulduz
- Sevil

Vasif Adigozalov:

- Natavan, mugham opera, 2003

Shafiga Akhundova:

- Galin gayasi ("Bride’s Rock"). The first opera written by an Azerbaijani woman composer, 1972.

Other prominent operas:

- Tenderness by Gara Garayev
- Motherland by Gara Garayev and Jovdat Hajiyev
- Azad (Free) by Jahangir Jahangirov
- The Fate of the Singer by Jahangir Jahangirov
- Expectation by Franghiz Ali-Zadeh
- Isgandar and the Shepherd by Soltan Hajibeyov (children's opera)
- Seven Beauties by Eldar Mansurov (rock-opera)

== Notable performers ==
=== Individuals ===
Dinara Aliyeva · Shovkat Mammadova · Fatma Mukhtarova

==== Female ====
- Dinara Aliyeva
- Sona Aslanova
- Fidan Gasimova
- Khuraman Gasimova
- Gulkhar Hasanova
- Nazakat Mammadova
- Shovkat Mammadova
- Fatma Mukhtarova
- Rubaba Muradova
- Hagigat Rzayeva

Ahmed Agdamski · Muslim Magomayev · Elchin Azizov

==== Male ====
- Ahmed Agdamski
- Yusif Eyvazov
- Elchin Azizov
- Rashid Behbudov
- Bulbul
- Huseynagha Hajibababeyov
- Lutfiyar Imanov
- Muslim Magomayev
- Huseyngulu Sarabski
