= Zulfugar Sariyev =

Zulfugar Sariyev Zülfüqar Sarıyev
- Born: January 1883; Shusha, Shusha uezd, Elizavetpol Governorate, Russian Empire
- Died: 1969 (aged 85–86); Baku, Azerbaijan SSR, USSR
- Occupation: singer

Zulfugar Huseyn oghlu Sariyev (Azerbaijani: Zülfüqar Hüseyn oğlu Sarıyev; 1883 – 1969) was an Azerbaijani opera singer, mugham performer, Honored Artist of the Azerbaijan SSR (1940).

== Biography ==
Zulfugar Huseyn oghlu Sariyev was born in January 1883 (in some sources, 1888) in the city of Shusha. Since Sariyev's father died in his childhood, he had had to work with his brother. In addition to his interest for mugham and national music, his vocal abilities made it possible for him to become a singer. He learned Azerbaijani mughams from khanandas of his time from phonograph records.

Starting from 1917, Zulfugar Sariyev performed in clubs, and from 1920 on the opera stage. Throughout his career, he worked with Huseyngulu Sarabski, Huseynagha Hajibababeyov, Sona Mustafayeva, Suraya Qajar, Hagigat Rzayeva, Ali Zulalov, and later Khanlar Hagverdiyev, Aliovsat Sadigov, Shirzad Huseynov and others. Zulfugar Sariyev performed various roles in Uzeyir Hajibeyov's "Leyli and Majnun", "Asli and Kerem", "Koroghlu", Zulfugar Hajibeyov's "Ashig Garib", Muslim Magomayev's "Shah Ismayil" and other operas on the stage of the Azerbaijan State Academic Opera and Ballet Theater.

Despite his lyric tenor vocals and performance abilities, Zulfugar Sariyev was always forced to play secondary roles due to his short stature. Therefore, he was mainly a performer of characteristic roles.

In addition to opera performances, Zulfugar Sariyev performed in open concerts organized in the radio studios and cultural palaces of Baku with singers such as Khan Shushinski, Huseynagha Hajibababeyov, Zulfu Adigozalov, Khanlar Hagverdiyev, Aliovsat Sadigov, Munavvar Kalantarli, accompanied by the Azerbaijan State Orchestra of Folk Instruments.

Zulfugar Sariyev was awarded the honorary title of "Honored Artist of the Azerbaijan SSR" on 27 April 1940.

Zulfugar Sariyev died in Baku in 1969.
