= Sona Mustafayeva =

Azerbaijani opera soprano (1916–1999

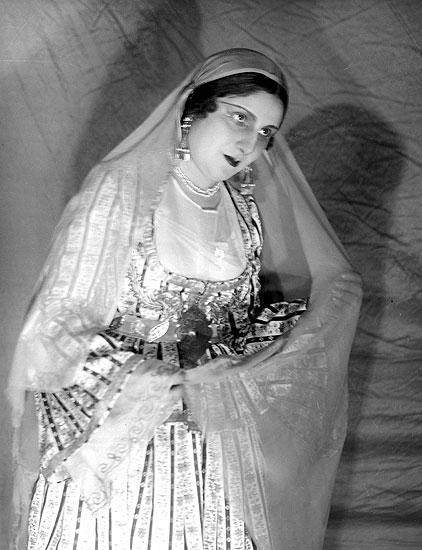
- Born: 22 June 1916; Baku, Baku Governorate, Russian Empire
- Died: 1999 (aged 82–83); Baku, Azerbaijan
- Citizenship: Russian Empire → Az. Dem. Rep. → Soviet Union → Azerbaijan
- Occupation: Soprano opera singer
- Organization: Azerbaijan State Academic Opera and Ballet Theater
- Awards: Honored Artist of the Azerbaijan SSR

Sona Ayyub gizi Mustafayeva (Baghirova) (Azerbaijani: Sona Əyyub qızı Mustafayeva (Bağırova), 22 June 1916 – 1999) was an Azerbaijani vocalist-actress. She was awarded the title Honored Artist of the Azerbaijan SSR.

== Biography ==
Sona Mustafayeva was born on 22 June 1916 in Baku. From 1930 she performed as a soloist at the Azerbaijan State Opera and Ballet Theater.

Mustafayeva, who had a lyric soprano voice, helped the troupe for about a year by invitation when the Azerbaijan State Theatre of Musical Comedy began operating as an independent theater in 1938. Here she performed the parts of Gulchohra and Gulnaz (Arshin Mal Alan and Mashadi Ibad by Uzeyir Hajibeyov).

Mustafayeva died in 1999 in Baku.

== Awards ==
- Honored Artist of the Azerbaijan SSR (17 June 1943)
- Order of the Badge of Honour (17 April 1938)

== Main roles ==
Role	Opera	Author(s)
Nigar	Koroghlu	Uzeyir Hajibeyov
Gulchohra	Arshin Mal Alan	Uzeyir Hajibeyov
Gulnaz	Mashadi Ibad	Uzeyir Hajibeyov
Aghja giz	Ashig Garib	Zulfugar Hajibeyov
Gulzar	Shah Ismayil	Muslim Magomayev
Nargiz and Naznaz	Nargiz	Muslim Magomayev
Dilbar	Vatan	Gara Garayev and Jovdat Hajiyev
Shirin	Khosrov and Shirin	Niyazi
Rana	Nizami	Afrasiyab Badalbeyli
Durna	Durna	Suleyman Rustam and Said Rustamov
