= Aliovsat Sadigov =

Aliovsat Sadigov Əliövsət Sadıqov
- Born: 21 December 1906; Nukha, Nukha Uyezd, Elisabethpol Governorate
- Died: 17 October 1970 (aged 63) Baku, Azerbaijan SSR, USSR
- Genres: opera
- Occupations: singer, actor
- Awards: People's Artist of the Azerbaijan SSR Honored Artist of the Azerbaijan SSR Order of the Badge of Honour

Aliovsat Shirali oghlu Sadigov (Azerbaijani: Əliövsət Şirəli oğlu Sadıqov, 21 December 1906 — 17 November 1970) was an Azerbaijani opera singer, People's Artist of the Azerbaijan SSR.

== Biography ==
Aliovsat Sadigov was born on 21 December 1906 in Nukha. He studied at the Azerbaijan State Conservatoire in 1928–1930. His voice was a lyric tenor. After graduation, he began working as a soloist at the Azerbaijan State Opera and Ballet Theater in 1930–1963.

The characters he created are more remarkable in Uzeyir Hajibeyov's "Leyli and Majnun" (Majnun, Ibn Salam and Zayd), "Asli and Kerem" (Kerem), "Koroghlu" (Eyvaz), Zulfugar Hajibeyov's "Ashig Garib" (Garib), Reinhold Glière's "Shahsanam" (Ashig Garib and Ashig Samad), Muslim Magomayev's "Shah Ismayil" (Shah Ismayil), "Nargiz" (Molla Mutallim), translated "Safa" (Ashig Musa) operas and Uzeyir Hajibeyov's "Arshin mal alan" (Suleyman), "Mashadi Ibad"(Hambal and Sarvar) operettas.

In the last years of his life he worked as a consultant pedagogue at the Opera Theater. Aliovsat Sadigov died in Baku on 17 November 1970, and was buried in the Second Alley of Honor.

== Awards ==
- People's Artist of the Azerbaijan SSR — 1956
- Honored Artist of the Azerbaijan SSR
- Order of the Badge of Honour
