= Nizami (opera) =

1939 opera by Afrasiyab Badalbeyli

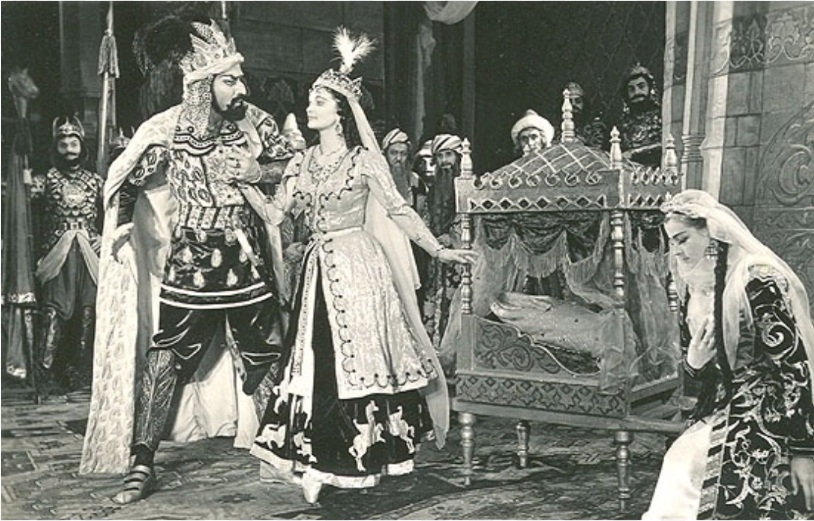
Scene from the premiere

Nizami is a historical opera written in 1939 by the composer Afrasiyab Badalbeyli. It is telling about the life of the poet Nizami Ganjavi. The music and the libretto of the opera were written by Afrasiyab Badalbeyli based on the plot and motives of Mammad Said Ordubadi's novel the "Sword and Feather". The premiere of the opera took place on 12 December 1948 at the Azerbaijan State Opera and Ballet Theatre.

The opera consists of 5 acts and 6 paintings. The multi-act nature of the opera, the large number of participants and massive scenes with the choir, the magnificent scenes in the palace are somewhat reminiscent of the genre of the European opera. In Nizami Ganjavi's work, who is worried about the fate of the city, and of the people close to him by the spirit fight against those who pursue their own interests being fully thirsty for power, the poet is presented as a noble person who loves his people and his hometown.

Afrasiyab Badalbeyli devoted much space to the choral scenes in opera, the role of this direction being brought to the fore. "Nizami" became one of the works that contributed to the development of the operatic art in Azerbaijan. The work is assessed by specialists as a positive experience in terms of expanding in Azerbaijan the thematic, genre range and the novelty of the content in this direction.

== History ==
=== Sources and topics ===
Nizami's creation is highly appreciated by famous philosophers, literary and art historians, scientists and statesmen. There were written numerous novels, plays on various topics, and poems dedicated to his personality based on his works and life.

Nizami's legacy has long been at the centre of attention of the world scientific and literary thought. In Azerbaijan, the poet was published many times, and various studies to popularize his literary heritage were carried out, and for the first time a scientific-critical text of his works was prepared. This process intensified mainly during the 800th anniversary of Nizami Ganjavi to be celebrated. The decision to celebrate the anniversary at the state level was made on 25 July 1939, however due to the Second World War this became possible only in 1947. Nevertheless, the 800th anniversary of the poet was celebrated in 1941 in the State Hermitage of the besieged Leningrad. The solemn event dedicated to the poet's anniversary took place only in 1947 in Baku. Starting from this time, new studies of the life and work of Nizami began to be carried out. At the poet's burial place, in the city of Ganja, a mausoleum was raised, and there were held events to perpetuate his memory.

One of the main researchers of the life and work of Nizami Ganjavi, Saadat Abdullayeva, notes that “composers, of course, could not remain indifferent to the highly ideological works of Nizami. This is indicated by the works written in almost all genres of the classical music based on the poet's poems - operas, ballets, symphonies, symphonic poems, symphonic and choreographic suites”.

Choral poems, works for mixed choir and piano, poems for soloists, chorus and symphony orchestra, lyric songs for orchestra were written on the lyrics of Nizami. In addition, Nizami's ghazals inspired composers to write numerous songs and romances. Saadat Abdullayeva writes that “the works of Uzeyir Hajibeyov “Sensiz” (“Without You”) and “Sevgili Janan” (“Beloved”) laid the foundation for a new genre of the “musical gazelle” or “ghazal-romance” in Azerbaijani music. Interestingly, ghazals became more popular after the music was written on them”.

The image of Nizami was embodied in the opera and ballet named after him. A string symphony, a vocal-symphonic poem, a cantata, an oratorio, a string quintet, an elegy, mugham etudes, choral works, and a poem were dedicated to the memory of Nizami Ganjavi. Dramatic works and films based on the works of Nizami are also accompanied by music. All these works played an important role in enriching the musical culture of Azerbaijan as well as the creative activity of the composers.

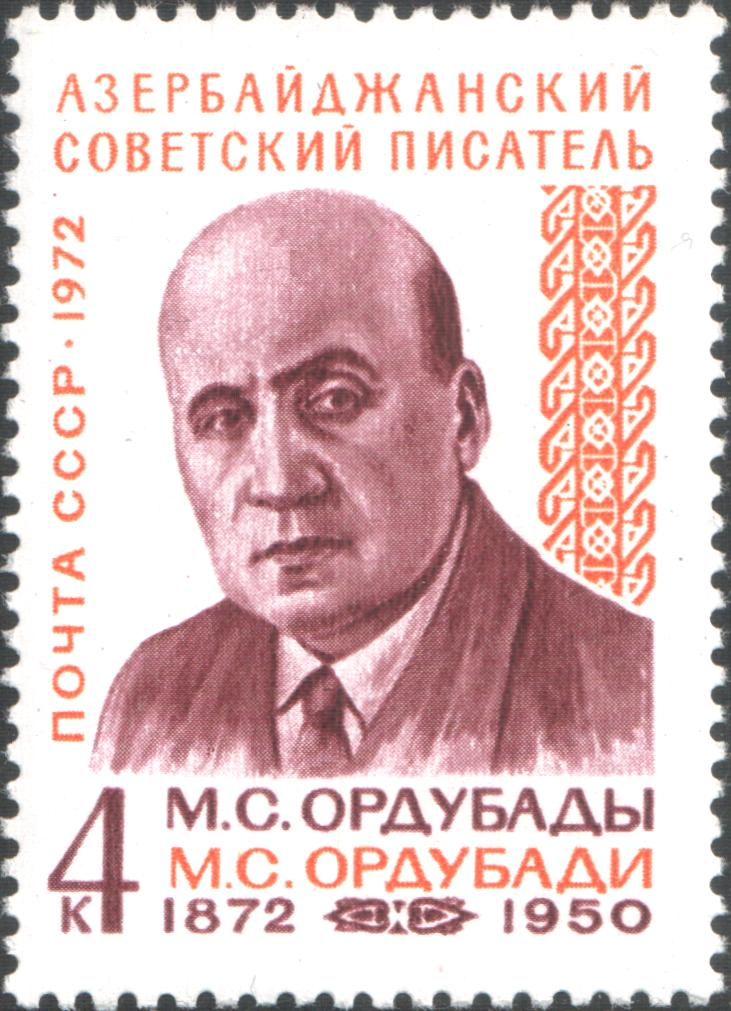
A postage stamp of the USSR in 1972 with the image of Mamed Said Ordubadi, the author of the novel the "Sword and Feather", the plot and motives of which Afrasiyab Badalbeyli used when writing the libretto of the "Nizami" opera.

One of the main researchers of the life and work of Nizami Ganjavi, Rashid Shafag, speaking about the "Nizami" opera, notes:

Nizami Ganjavi is one of the genius poets of the world’s literature and a brilliant personality of the universal culture’s progressive thinkers. In his works, the peculiarities of the oriental thinking, the views of life, the concept of time and space found their high artistic expression. Possessing rich encyclopaedic knowledge, Nizami played an important role in the convergence and development of the Eastern and Western cultures. The image of Nizami was embodied in the opera and ballet named after him. The opera "Nizami" by the brilliant composer Afrasiyab Badalbayli is one of the praiseworthy works that raise the greatness of his work to the highest level. This composer’s creature is an irreplaceable point in his work.

Saadat Abdullaeva notes:

Naturally, Azerbaijani composers did not stand aside either. Those, inspired by the poetry of Nizami, wrote numerous musical works of various genres based on the poet’s creation "Khamsa", gazelles and on the basis of his life path. According to them, the poet’s humanistic ideas and images created became an inexhaustible source of inspiration for them. Nizami’s poems were also perceived by the musicologists as valuable examples for studying the musical culture of the era the poet lived in. For the first time, the issues of reflecting music in Nizami Ganjavi’s creation, as well as the image and literary heritage of the poet in the work of composers were raised in 1940s by the prominent composer, conductor, musicologist, publicist and public figure Afrasiyab Badalbeyli.

Creating the opera "Nizami", Afrasiyab Badalbeyli used the plot and motives of the novel the "Sword and Pen" by the Azerbaijani Soviet writer Mamed Said Ordubadi. This novel tells about the situation of the broad strata during the life of Nizami, the country’s external relations, the literature and art of that time, the people of art, the statesmen, the people’s struggle for freedom. The image of Nizami Ganjavi occupies a central place in the work. However, the author went beyond, he tried to describe the time in which Nizami lived as broadly and comprehensively as possible.

=== Creating the opera ===
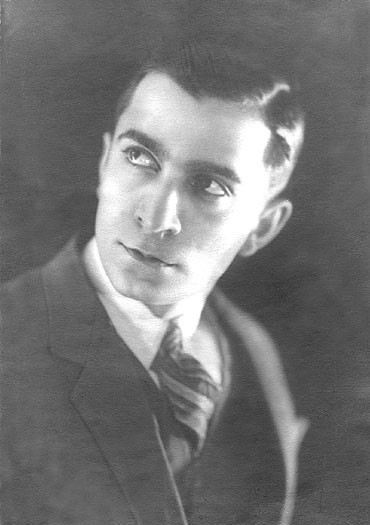
The composer Afrasiyab Badalbeyli, the author of the opera "Nizami" (1930s)

The end of the Great Patriotic War in 1945 allowed the Azerbaijani people to return to the peaceful creative work. In the new post-war peaceful conditions, the content and themes of the literary and artistic works and all types of art have been significantly renewed. The authors in many genres began to be attracted by the topics related to history, the significant events of the past, the literary monuments and the nation's cultural heritage.

New themes and images led to search for new genres, forms, means of expression, expanding the range of creativity in certain areas of art. Zemfira Samadova notes: “One of the manifestations of the expansion of the ideological and thematic, figurative-genre range in the field of operatic creation was staging the opera “Nizami” in the Azerbaijan State Opera and Ballet Theatre in a new, for the national spectator, genre.”

In 1939, the composer Afrasiyab Badalbeyli was commissioned to write an opera on the occasion of the 800th anniversary of the poet and thinker Nizami Ganjavi. Badalbeyli wrote the opera, but the Second World War and the Great Patriotic War prevented its production.

Badalbeyli set himself the goal of creating an image of the historical personality, poet, philosopher, in a genre not previously represented in the national opera, and thus bringing something new to it. The composer, pursuing the goal of glorifying the famous poet in music, for the first time brought to the stage a living image of a person whom the people knew well and who embodied all the best qualities of the mankind. The opera "Nizami" by Afrasiyab Badalbeyli consists of 5 acts and 6 pictures.

When writing the opera, the composer relied on the content of the "Sword and Pen" novel by Mamed Said Ordubadi. The author of such novels as "Foggy Tabriz", "Secret Baku", "The Fighting City" chose for the novel "Sword and Pen" the form of an epic narration with an interval plot development. The fate of the heroes unfolds against the backdrop of social and political conflicts. Here struggle and suffering are mixed with betrayal, love - with hatred, murder and palace intrigues. The events take place in the 12th century in Ganja. The foundation of the narration is made up of social and political events from both the life of people and the personal life of the poet. Nizami witnessed a number of events that had a negative impact on his life and work.

=== Staging ===
On 13 December 1939, the artists of the Azerbaijan State Opera and Ballet Theatre performed the first act of the Nizami opera, accompanied by the Baku Philharmonic Symphony Orchestra. Fragments of the opera were performed during the 1939-1940 concert season. The Great Patriotic War began in 1941, due to that the premiere of the opera was postponed. It took place on 12 December 1948 and was a great success. The stage director was the People's Artist of the USSR Ismayil Hidayatzade, the conductor was the Honoured Art Worker, the author of the opera "Nizami" Afrasiyab Badalbeyli. The artistic design of the production was performed by the artist Fyodor Gusak. The roles were played by: Murtuza Mamedov (Bulbul) - Nizami Ganjavi, Sona Mustafayeva - Azra, Fatma Mukhtarova - Rena, Huseynagha Hajibababekov - Khosrov, Aghababa Bunyadzada - ruler Gizil Arslan, Boyukagha Mustayev - Amin Kharis, and others.

== Music ==
The opera "Nizami", written by Afrasiyab Badalbeyli, consists of 5 acts and 6 pictures. The opera's events take place in Ganja, which at the described time was a point of the collision of the various states and forces' interests. The characters of the opera - Nizami Ganjavi and people close to him in spirit - are representatives of various social’s strata who care about the fate of their hometown. They try to resist those who seek their own benefit and thirst for power.

However, it turned out to be impossible to achieve the primary goal set in the opera's libretto. The novel's social conflict was not logically reflected there. The events in Ganja essentially led to the expression of palace intrigues. The image of the main character in the libretto was not reflected comprehensively, it was somewhat static, so the poet's philosophical views were not fully disclosed.

The events of that period were covered in abstract judgments that the opera's hero only made judgments about them without taking part in those.

The part of Nizami in the opera represents the great poet in arias and arioso as a noble man who loves his people and the hometown. His aria, in the fourth act, is one of the expressions of these feelings. The part of Nizami was masterfully performed by Murtuza Mamedov. This performance has been repeatedly noted in the press. Nizami's aria performed by Bulbul and conducted by Niyazi was included in the program of the gala concert dedicated to the 800th anniversary of Nizami Ganjavi held on 27 September 1947.

An ode to the great poetic talent of Nizami Ganjavi sounds in the composition "Fahriyya". In this aria, Nizami sings his poems.

The composer Afrasiyab Badalbeyli, basing on folk music, brings elements of mugham to Nizami's aria. It is with mugham intonations that the poet Nizami, with excitement, expresses his admiration. These intonations are performed starting from the upper register. As it is specific in mugham, the melody falls to maya (meaning skeleton, foundation).

Afrasiyab Badalbeyli accompanies the image of the tender and sincere Rena, with whom Nizami is in love, with a lyrical melody close to the repertoire of the classical opera. In Rena's ballad, the composer relies on Nizami's poems. Thus, Badalbeyli expresses his attitude to Rena's image and emphasizes its closeness to Nizami Ganjavi's image.

The image of a new type of woman is Azra, the daughter of Amin Kharisa. For the first time in the opera "Nizami", a female voice sounded in the mezzo-soprano register, and this marked a novelty in the national opera.

Before the opera Nizami, low male and female voices were not used in Azerbaijani operas. The innovation in this direction was introduced by Afrasiyab Badalbeyli.

Zemfira Safarova, describing the opera "Nizami", notes:

The opera "Nizami" left the Azerbaijani stage relatively early. However, in its music there are some masterfully written parts that are distinguished by their unusual melodiousness. Therefore, it is no coincidence that opera parts are performed at concerts and win the favour of the audience. The opera "Nizami" has become the next step in the development of the Azerbaijani opera art.

=== Chorus ===
Afrasiyab Badalbeyli, in the opera "Nizami", thoroughly approached the problem of the development of the choral art. Wide choral scenes in the opera "Koroglu" gave impetus to the appeal of Azerbaijani composers to the polyphonic forms in operas. This, to a certain extent, influenced Badalbeyli. Thus, in the last act of the opera "Nizami", the scene of the fire was presented in the form of a fugato with the participation of the chorus. The chorus is used to complete the last scenes or to enhance the mood and the emotional experiences of the characters.

The female choir, the performance of which accompanies the scene of Rena getting poisoned by Azra, the male choir that accompanies the scene when the poets gathered to listen to Nizami Ganjavi, and other choirs keep the same character.

== Images ==
Nizami - the main character

Rena - the girl that Nizami is in love with

Azra - a girl in love with Nizami

Gizil Arslan - the ruler of the Eldaniz State

Amin Kharis - the successor to the Muslim Caliphate

Khosrov - the ruler of Ganja

=== Nizami ===
Nizami is the main character of the opera. This image is based on the personality of Nizami Ganjavi. The main theme of the opera is Nizami's personal life. The protagonist of the novel, the poet Nizami Ganjavi, witnessed many events that negatively affected his personal life and creation. In the opera, Nizami is presented as a poet who fights against injustice and who is loved by people. This image was embodied by Murtuza Mammadov at the premiere of the opera "Nizami" at the Azerbaijan State Opera and Ballet Theatre.

The opera also shows Nizami's feeling of affection. He tries to protect Rena until the troops of Gizil Arslan enter Ganja. He rejects Azra, the daughter of Amin Kharis, the successor to the Muslim Caliphate, in the favour of the woman he loves. In the novel, Nizami Ganjavi is interested in the fate of the city, and in the people, close to him by spirit in fighting against those who pursue their own interests and yearn for power. The poet is presented as a noble person who loves his people and the hometown.

Rashid Shafag writes:

The opera “Nizami” is dedicated to the great Azerbaijani poet Nizami Ganjavi. It shows the poet's image, the atmosphere of the political and social life of the Azerbaijani people of those distant years, the complex world of human relations. The inconsistency of Nizami's moral ideal with the reality did not break the poet's faith in man and justice.

=== Rena ===
Rena is one of the main heroines of the opera. She is a pure, beautiful and intelligent girl. Zemfira Safarova notes:

Rena is a woman whom Nizami preferred to such a beauty as Azra. The image is based on this idea. Nizami is doing everything to protect Rena from the evil that reached her.

Nizami tries to protect Rena until the troops of the Red Lion enter Ganja. He rejects Azra, the daughter of Amin Kharis, the successor to the Muslim Caliphate, in the favour of his beloved Rena. This role at the premiere of the opera "Nizami" held at the Azerbaijan State Opera and Ballet Theatre was performed by Sona Mustafayeva.

=== Azra ===
Azra is one of the main characters in the opera "Nizami". Zemfira Samadova notes that the image of Azra was conceived and presented as negative. She's used to getting whatever she wants.

The ruler of Ganja is in love with her, but she declares to him that she loves Nizami. As the opera progresses, Azra and the ruler plan to kill Rena. Azra wants to hurt the poet who rejected her love in this way.

The image of Azra at the premiere of the opera "Nizami" held at the Azerbaijan State Opera and Ballet Theatre was portrayed by Fatma Mukhtarova.

== Libretto ==
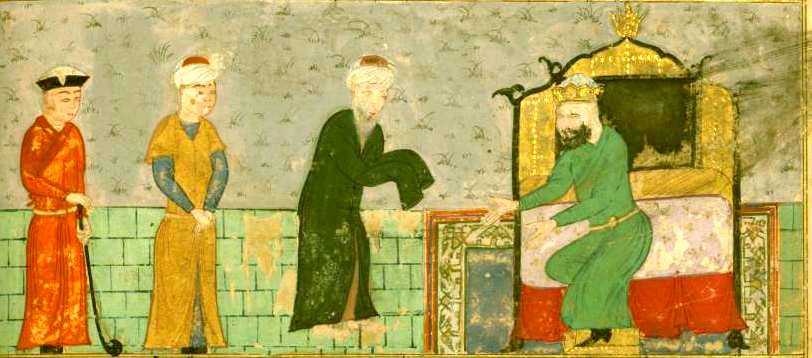
Nizami Ganjavi at a reception with the ruler of the Eldaniz state, Gizil Arslan. Miniature from a manuscript of 1481. Walters Art Museum, Baltimore, the USA

The fate of the participants in the events unfolds against the background of the social and political conflicts. Here the struggle and suffering are mixed with betrayal, love - with hatred, murder and palace intrigues. Events unfold in the 12th century in Ganja. The content is based on the social and political events and the personal life of the poet Nizami. He witnessed a number of events that had a negative impact on his life and creation. The opera "Nizami" written by Afrasiyab Badalbeyli consists of 5 acts and 6 pictures.

=== First act ===
A warm spring day in Ganja. Nizami Ganjavi, surrounded by poets, reads his new poems. In the same garden, accompanied by the poet's courtier Kemaleddin, the ruler of Ganja is walking. The sounds of a bugle announce the arrival of the ruler Gizil Arslan's envoy who hands over letters to the ruler and Nizami. Gizil Arslan invites Nizami to his palace and instructs him to write a new poem.

The ruler is angry and accuses him of inciting a rebellion and threatens with revenge. The song of the girls is heard from afar. This is the song of Azra, the daughter of Amin Kharis, the successor of the Muslim Caliphate. The ruler is in love with Azra, but the girl does not respond to his confessions of passionate love. Her heart belongs to someone else. Azra's group also has a young girl named Rena.

Rena sings about her love for Nizami. A response song is heard, Nizami responds with a mutual recognition. Azra watches the scene and insults Rena in anger. To improve his relations with Azra, the ruler orders Rena to be included in the list of maids sent to the Caliph's palace in Baghdad.

=== Second act ===
The ruler of Ganja goes to woo Azra in the palace of Amin Kharis. The court poets glorify the distinguished guest. Among those who received an invitation to the feast, there is also Nizami. The owner of the palace invites him to praise the ruler, however, instead, the poet sings the aria "Fahriya", praising his own work.

Azra's arrival sparks the general excitement. The ruler of Ganja declares that he came here to ask her hand for marriage. But Azra again rejects him and confesses that she loves Nizami. To take revenge on Nizami, the ruler orders Rena to be branded. Nizami, defending Rena, at the same time, rejects Azra's love.

=== Third act ===
Gizil Arslan greets Nizami with honours. The poet presents him with his new poem "Khosrov and Shirin". He believes that Gizil Arslan is a just ruler who cares about the welfare of the country. Shouts outside interrupt the conversation.

Nizami is interested in the cause of the uproar. At this time, the guards bring a young man. It turns out that by the order of Gizil Arslan, his son had just had his tongue cut off. Shocked by this event, Nizami leaves the palace and returns to his hometown.

=== Fourth act ===
==== First picture ====
Once remained alone, Azra decides to take revenge on Nizami. It is difficult to take revenge on a poet who has won the popular love, however Azra and the ruler find a way - to kill Rena and thereby inflict a blow on her loving poet.

==== Second picture ====
The ruler of Ganja is trying to force Nizami to go against the interests of the people with gifts, promises, flattery and even threats. He, complaining on confusion, wants to leave the palace, but suddenly hears Rena's scream.

=== Fifth act ===
Ganja is surrounded by the troops of Gizil Arslan. The inhabitants of the city, exhausted by war, gather at the house of Nizami. Amin Kharis and the ruler also appear there. The latter orders Nizami to be an intermediary between him and Gizil Arslan, but the poet refuses. The angry ruler orders the city to be burned. The troops of Gizil Arslan enter Ganja.

Nizami is shocked by the events that have taken place. The people, surrounding their beloved poet, are trying to calm him down and convince him that justice will prevail.

== Reviews ==
The opera "Nizami" by Afrasiyab Badalbeyli gained popularity and was included in concerts several times. It was staged at the Azerbaijan State Opera and Ballet Theatre named after Mirza Fatali Akhundov.

Heydar Aliyev noted that Fikret Amirov's ballet “One Thousand and One Nights”, Jahangir Jahangirov’s opera “The Fate of Khananda” and the poem “On the other side of Araz”, the opera “Nizami” by the famous representative of the Badalbeyli dynasty Afrasiyab Badalbeyli and, along with them, many symphonic works are great events in the musical life of Azerbaijan.

Zemfira Safarova in her book on the opera “Nizami” writes: “The multi-act nature of the opera, the large number of participants and the crowd scenes with the choir, spectacular scenery (it is enough to recall the scene of the fire in the form of a fugato in the fifth act or the battle scene), luxurious scenes in the palace are somewhat reminiscent of opera genre of the European "Grand Opera".

She adds that “the opera “Nizami” left the stage relatively early. It became the next step in the development of the Azerbaijani opera art. The very fact of updating the thematic-genre range of the Azerbaijani operatic creation, the widespread use of figurative-contrasting forces (or voices) attracted the attention as an innovation of the content in the operatic genre and a positive experience on the way to solving the problems facing the art of opera".

Lala Azeri notes that “the "Nizami" opera by Afrasiyab Badalbeyli has become a significant event in the musical culture of Azerbaijan in terms of expanding the ideological-thematic, figurative-genre range in the operatic creation. For the first time, the author brought on the opera stage the immortal image of the genius Azerbaijani poet Nizami Ganjavi... In this work, Nizami Ganjavi and the people close to him who care about the fate of the city are fighting against those who are looking for their own benefit and thirst for power. The poet is presented as a person who loves his people and the city in which he was born. Afrasiyab Badalbeyli devoted a wide space to the choral scenes in the opera, bringing the role of this genre to the fore. This is an indication that the composer paid a special attention to the development of the choral art. The opera "Nizami" became one of the works that determined the development of the operatic art in Azerbaijan. The work is assessed by experts as a positive experience in terms of updating the content and expanding the genre and the thematic range of this direction in Azerbaijan."

Lala Azeri adds that “although the staging life of the opera “Nizami” was short, its music is distinguished by an unusual melody. The outstanding singers Fatma Mukhtarova and Rakhila Jabbarova performed arias from the opera "Nizami" with a great skill. And at present, Nizami's aria, performed by the soloist of the Azerbaijan State Opera and Ballet Theatre named after Mirza Fatali Akhundov the Honoured Artist Ramil Gasimov continues its life."

== History ==
In 1939, in connection with the upcoming 800th anniversary of Nizami Ganjavi, Afrasiyab Badalbeyli was entrusted with the creation of an opera about the life of the great thinker and poet of the 12th century. Due to the World War II that began in 1941, the premiere of the opera was postponed.

The first performance of the opera took place on 12 December 1948 on the stage of the Azerbaijan Opera and Ballet Theatre.
