= Sariyev =

Sariyev, Azerbaijani: Sarıyev, Kyrgyz: Сариев, Kazakh: Сариев is a surname. Notable people with the surname include:

- Anuar Sariyev (born 1992), Kazakhstani Paralympic judoka
- Rauan Sariyev (born 1994), Kazakhstani footballer
- Temir Sariyev (born 1963), Kyrgyz politician
- Zulfugar Sariyev
