= Hagigat Rzayeva =

Hagigat Rzayeva Həqiqət Rzayeva
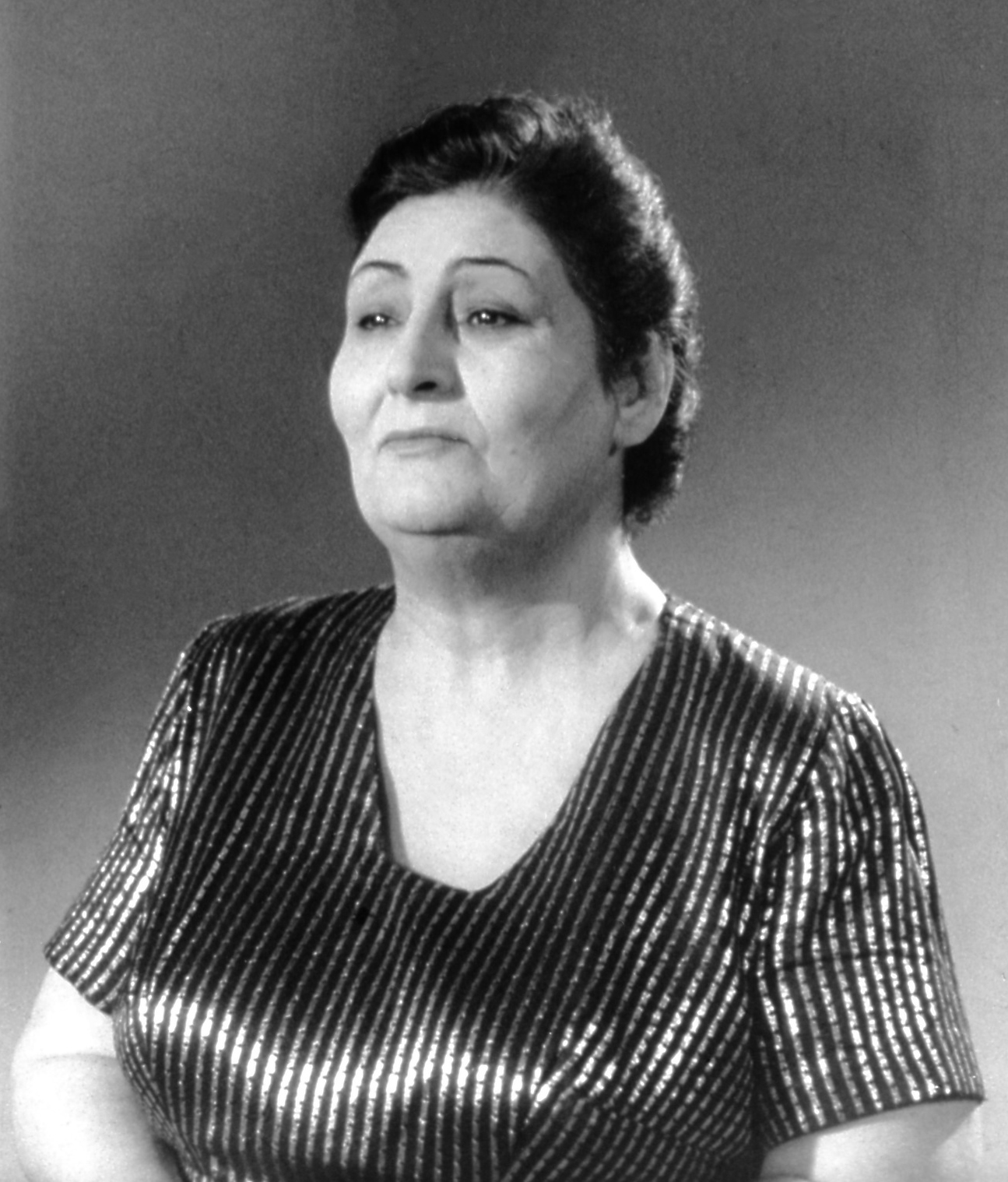
- Hagigat Rzayeva

Background information
- Born: 20 May 1907; Lankaran, Russian Empire (present-day Azerbaijan)
- Died: 2 August 1969 (aged 62) Baku, Azerbaijan SSR
- Genres: Opera, folk, pop
- Years active: 1927–1952

Hagigat Ali qizi Rzayeva (Azerbaijani: Həqiqət Rzayeva) (20 May 1907, Lankaran – 2 August 1969, Baku) was a Soviet Azerbaijani actress and singer of folk, opera, and pop music.

== Career ==
Hagigat Rzayeva was born on 20 May 1907 in a small village near Lankaran, Russian Empire (present-day southeastern Azerbaijan). Her father died of pneumonia when she was eighteen months old. Her mother then got married for the second time to a religious fanatic who often forbade Hagigat to pursue her academic and artistic endeavors that in his view prevented her from conforming to an image of a "perfect Muslim girl." Nevertheless, in 1917 she started attending Maryam Bayramalibeyova's secular Uns School for Girls in Lankaran, where a variety of activities helped her acting and singing skills improve and develop.

After Sovietization, Rzayeva moved to Baku to receive a post-secondary degree in teaching. While acting in an amateur on-campus theatre she took interest in opera and professional dramatic arts. After being tested by composer Muslim Magomayev she was hired to the Azerbaijan Opera Theatre against her family's will. It was then, at age twenty, that Rzayeva decided to completely abandon religious tradition and dedicate herself to acting despite uneasy terms with her relatives. She was admitted to the Azerbaijan State Conservatoire to study professional mugham (Azeri folk music genre) and opera. For fifteen years she performed with opera singer Huseyngulu Sarabski. In 1930 and 1934 she also appeared in three films.

Rzayeva was recognized as the People's Artiste of the Azerbaijan SSR in 1943, and continued acting in the Opera Theatre until her retirement in 1952. Her most famous roles are those of Arab Zangi (Shah Ismayil by Muslim Magomayev) and Sanam (O olmasin, bu olsun by Uzeyir Hajibeyov).

She married Huseyn Rzayev, the stage manager of the Opera Theatre, and had three children. Their two sons pursued careers in professional music while their daughter became a literature instructor at the Azerbaijan State Conservatoire.

== See also ==
- List of People's Artistes of the Azerbaijan SSR
- Yaver Kelenterli
- Jahan Talyshinskaya
- Munavvar Kalantarli
