= Fidan Gasimova =

Azerbaijani opera singer (born 1947)

Fidan Gasimova Fidan Qasımova
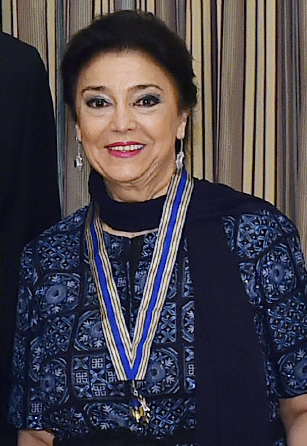
- Gasimova in 2017

Background information
- Born: June 17, 1947; Baku, Azerbaijan SSR, Soviet Union
- Genres: Classical
- Occupations: Singer, voice teacher
- Instrument: Singing

Fidan Akram gizi Gasimova (Note: Azerbaijani: Fidan Əkrəm qızı Qasımova; Russian: Фидан Экрем кызы Касимова, romanized: Fidan Ekrem kyzy Kasimova) (born 17 June 1947) is an Azerbaijani operatic soprano who was named a People's Artist of the USSR in 1988.

== Life ==
Gasimova was born in Baku, Azerbaijan SSR. Her parents, Akram Gasimov and Tukezban Gasimova, were lovers of music. In 1966, after studying under Bulbul, she entered the Azerbaijan State Conservatoire. Graduating with concentrations in violin and voice, Gasimova began graduate studies at the Moscow Conservatory. After receiving her degree, she returned to Baku.

In 1973 Gasimova won a silver medal in a young-vocalists contest in Geneva, and the following year she became a soloist with the Azerbaijan State Academic Opera and Ballet Theater. In 1977, she won a gold medal at an international contest in Italy. Since 1993 Gasimova has chaired the vocal department at the Baku Academy of Music, succeeding Kamal Kerimov.

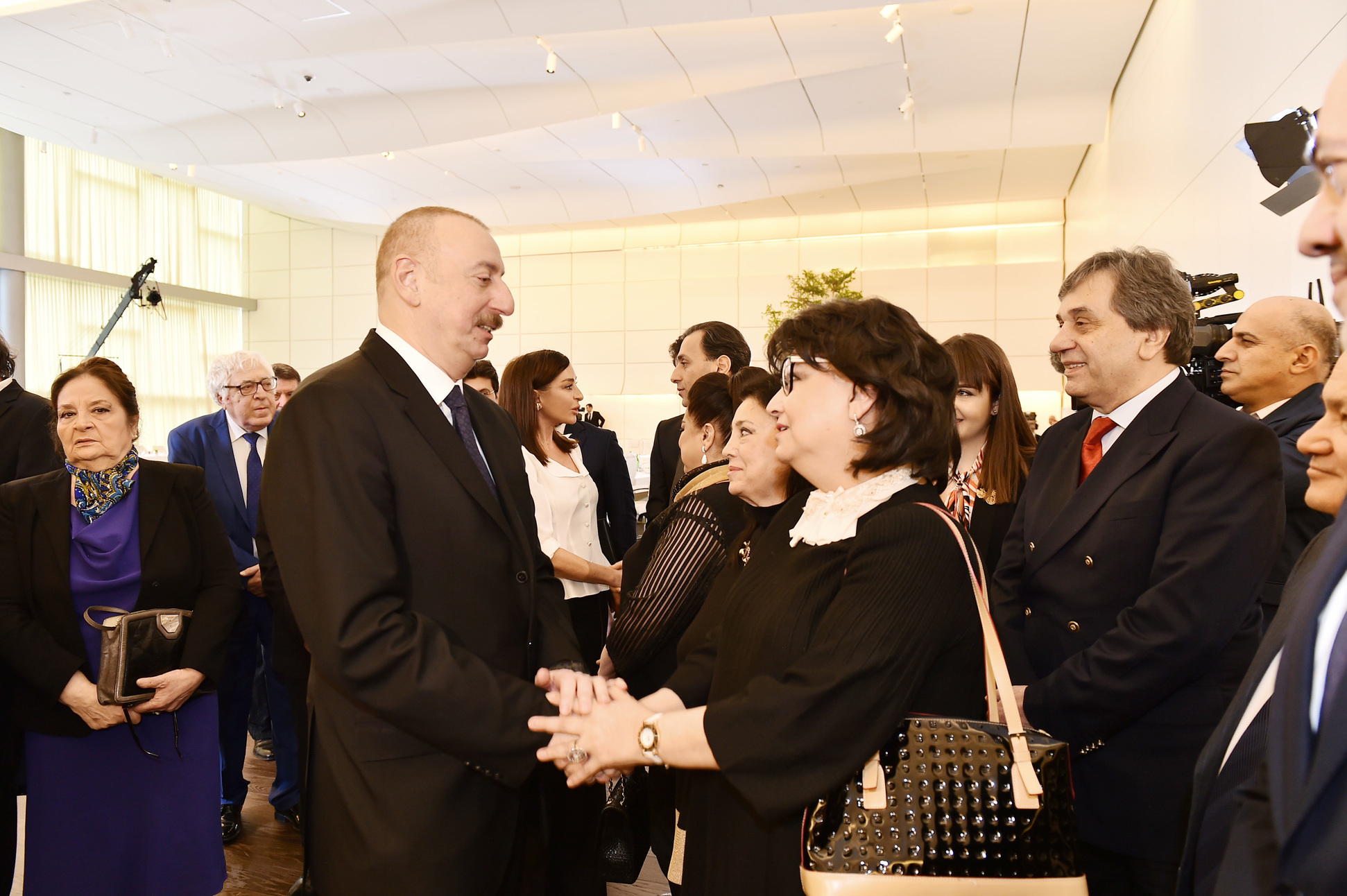
Ilham Aliyev meets Gasimova

In addition to her professorship at the Baku Academy of Music, Gasimova taught at the Istanbul Conservatoire from 1992 to 1998, later touring and leading master classes. In 1997 she received the Order of Glory from Azerbaijan Republic president Ilham Aliyev for her achievements.

== Family ==
Gasimova's younger sister, Khuraman, is also a well-known singer and a People's Artist of Azerbaijan; they have performed together in Azerbaijan and abroad. In October 2007, one of the last concerts by the Gasimova sisters was held at the Moscow Conservatoire. Gasimova has one son, Farid.

== Career ==
Gasimova has sung a number of roles from classic operas in Azerbaijan, Russia and other countries. Her roles have included Desdemona in Verdi's Otello, the title roles in Puccini's Tosca and Turandot and Mimi in La bohème, Micaëla in Bizet's Carmen, Tatyana in Tschaikovsky's Eugene Onegin, Nigar in Hajibeyov's Koroghlu, Margarita in Gounod's Faust and the title role in Amirov's Sevil.

Among the countries in which she has sung are the United States, Germany, Great Britain, Sweden, Norway, Switzerland, Austria, Mexico, Russia, France, Denmark, Cuba and Turkey. Gasimova has performed with the Moscow Symphonic Orchestra and in Azerbaijan.

In 2008 Gasimova released a version of "Bésame Mucho" dedicated to Mehriban Aliyeva, First Lady of Azerbaijan. On 23 June 2009, Gasimova and pianist and People's Artist of Russia Yuri Rozum performed at the Azerbaijan State Philharmonic Hall (named after Muslim Magomayev). Nargiz Pashayeva, Togrul Narimanbekov and Farhad Badalbeyli also appeared.

On 2 April 2010, Gasimova sang a solo recital in the Chamber Hall of the Moscow International Music House. The soprano performed songs by Western, Russian, and Azerbaijani composers, accompanied by Russian pianist Sergei Voronov; he also played a composition by Farid Akhund-Gasimov, Gasimova's son. In March 2011, Fidan and Khuraman Gasimova sang at a joint recital.
