= Franghiz Ahmadova =

Azerbaijani opera singer and music educator (1928–2011)

Franghiz Ahmadova Firəngiz Əhmədova
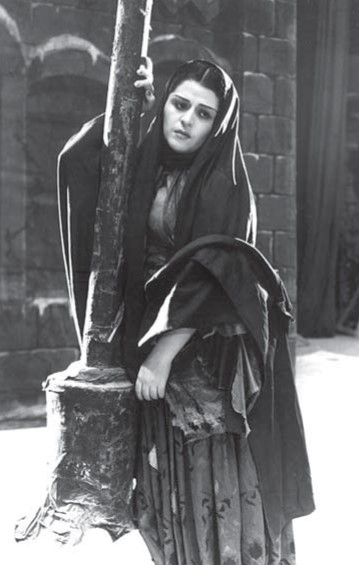
- Ahmadova performing in Sevil in 1959

Background information
- Born: September 23, 1928; Baku, Azerbaijani SSR, Soviet Union
- Died: December 16, 2011 (aged 83) Baku, Azerbaijan
- Genres: Classical
- Occupations: Opera singer, music teacher
- Instrument: Singing

Franghiz Yusif qizi Ahmadova (Note: Azerbaijani: Firəngiz Yusif qızı Əhmədova, sometimes given as Firangiz Ahmedova; Russian: Фирангиз Юсиф кызы Ахмедова, romanized: Firangiz Yusif kyzy Akhmedova) (23 September 1928 – 16 December 2011) was a prominent Azerbaijani operatic soprano and music teacher. From 1951, she performed as a soloist at the Azerbaijani State Opera. She toured widely across the former Soviet Union, singing in the major opera houses of eastern Europe.

== Biography ==
Franghiz Ahmadova was born on 23 September 1928 in Baku, Azerbaijan SSR, Soviet Union. She enjoyed music as a child, encouraged by her father who worked in the oil sector. Her mother, a botany teacher, realized that she was talented enough to attend the Baku Music College, where she was enrolled without previous experience. She went on to attend the Baku Academy of Music where she studied under Margarita Kolotova, graduating in 1955.

While at the music college, she made her first radio broadcast together with the school choir but her first notable appearance was during her years at the conservatory when Ismail Idayatzadeh, who headed the state opera, chose her to sing Nigar's aria from the Opera Koroghlu for an important concert. She performed it brilliantly. As a result, she was invited to join the state opera.

She had to wait some time before she was given solo parts but she made her début in the early 1950s, playing the title role in Muslim Magomayev's Nargiz She went on to play the leading soprano roles in Uzeyir Hajibeyov's Arshin Mal Alan and Fikret Amirov's Sevil as well as those in Tosca, Madame Butterfly and the most popular Russian operas. She performed with the State Opera from 1951 to 1988, after which she taught at the theatre until 1997.

Franghiz Ahmadova died in Baku on 16 December 2011.

== Honours and awards ==
In 1967, Ahmadova was awarded the Order of Lenin. On her 70th birthday, she was honoured with the Shohrat Order, Azerbaijan's highest distinction.
