= Oruj Orujov =

Azerbaijani press official

Orujov Oruj
- Oruc Orucov
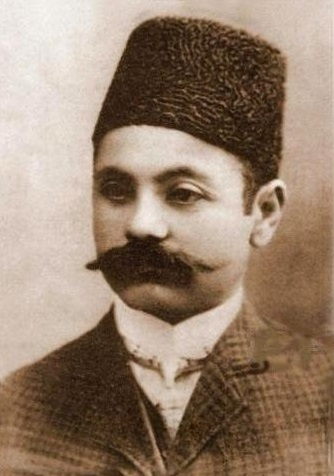
- Born: 1878-09-12; Alpout, Jevanshir uezd, Elizavetpol Governorate, Russian Empire
- Died: 1954-03-02; Barda, Barda District, Azerbaijan SSR, Soviet Union

Orujov Oruj Ali oglu (September 12, 1878, in Alpout, Javanshir district, Elizavetpol Governorate, Russian Empire – March 2, 1954, in Barda, Barda district, Azerbaijan SSR, USSR) was a press official, publisher, and publicist.

Together with his brothers Abuzar and Ganbar, he established the Orujov Brothers Publishing House, which was the largest publishing house in Azerbaijan at that time. He was a member of the Inspection Commission of the "Nijat" Muslim Charity Society and a member of the editorial board of the National Organization Committee of Writers and Journalists.

He faced persecution after the April occupation and was exiled in the 1930s.

== Life ==
Oruj Orujov was born on September 12, 1878, in the village of Alpout in Barda. He received his primary education at the village religious school and later graduated from the Elizavetpol Michael Art School. In 1896, he moved to Baku and began engaging in trade.

In 1905, along with his brothers Ganbar and Abuzar, he established the "Orujov Brothers" publishing house and began his publishing activities. The publishing house, equipped with modern facilities, had a store that sold books and writing supplies. From 1905 to 1917, "Orujov Brothers" publishing house released 333 books in various genres and subjects, along with several newspapers such as "Hakikat", "Yeni hakikat", "Gunesh", "Asari-hakikat," "Basirat," "İgbal", "Yeni İgbal", and more. Oruj Orujov himself started his journalistic career in 1909 and served as the editor of "Hakikat" (1909–1910), "Gunesh" (1910–1911), and "Yeni hakikat" (1911). Through his articles, he criticized the colonial policy of European imperialism in the East. In Baku, he was a member of the Inspection Commission of the "Nijat" Muslim Charity Society and assisted Haji Zeynalabdin Taghiyev in charitable work.

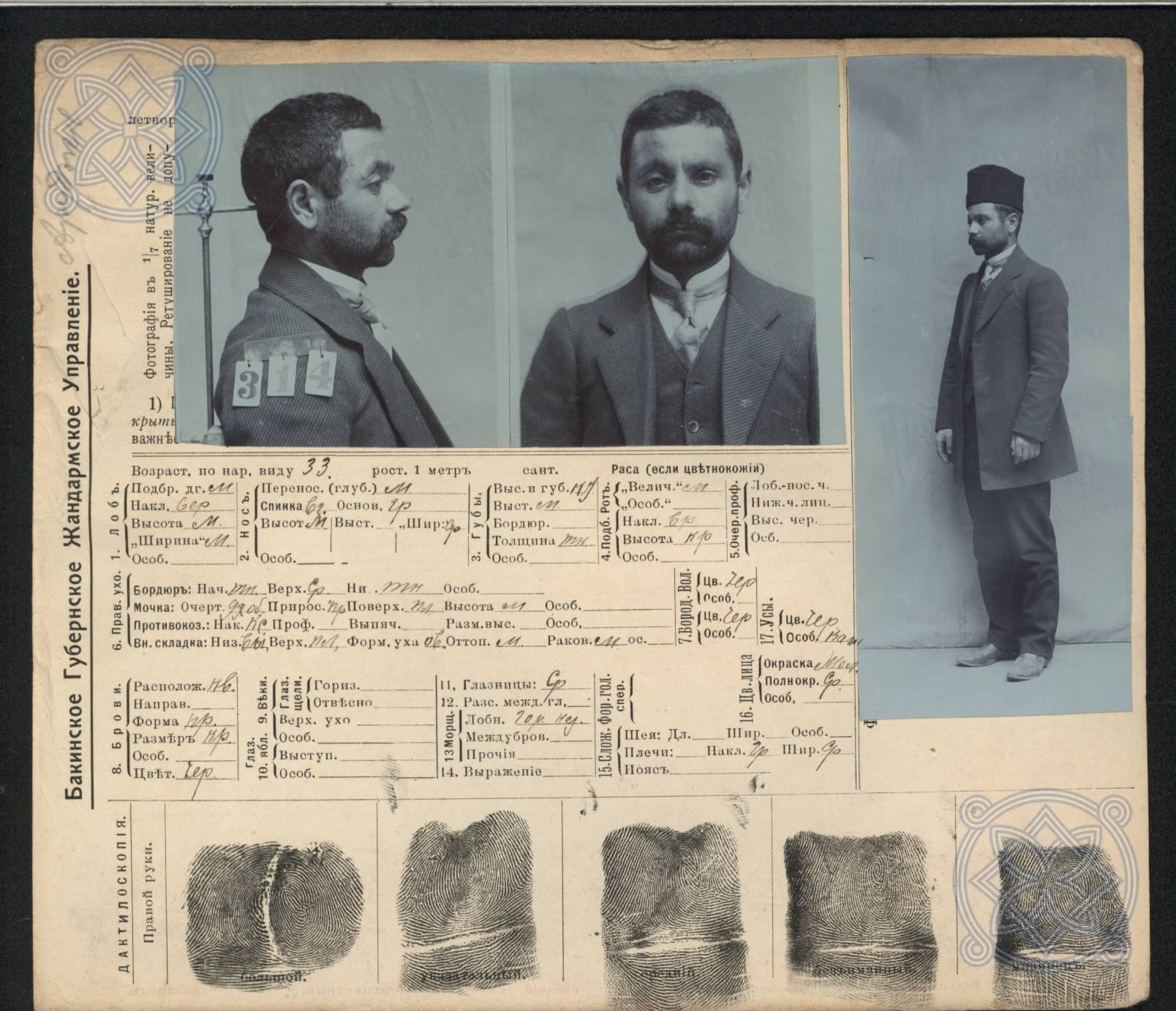
Bakı quberniyası jandarm idarəsinin hazırladığı Oruc Orucovun şəkli olan həbs sənədi (1911)

In March 1911, O. Orujov, along with a group of journalists, was arrested and accused of promoting Pan-Islamist ideas. They were subsequently imprisoned and exiled to the internal provinces of Russia. During their exile, Ahmed Agaoglu wrote an article titled "Injustices Against the Turks" in the "Tercüman-i Hakikat" newspaper published in Istanbul, addressing their imprisonment. While in exile, Orujov wrote articles for the "Iqbal" newspaper from Saratov, Nizhny Novgorod, and Warsaw, commenting on events happening in Baku. In 1913, following the amnesty decree issued for the 300th anniversary of the Romanov dynasty, Orujov returned to Baku and continued his publishing activities. In December 1917, he parted ways with his brothers Abuzar and Ganbar, and began working with Mahammad Amin Rasulzade in the "Achıq Soz" newspaper, serving as the director of the newspaper's publishing operations.

In 1917, he was elected to the editorial board alongside Mahammad Amin Rasulzade, Seyid Huseyn, Jeyhun Hajibeyli, Haji Ibrahim Gasimov, and Ali Pasha Huseynzade as part of the National Organization Committee of Writers and Journalists. He was a member of the "Musavat" Party. During the First Congress of the "Musavat" Party held from October 25 to 31 in 1917, he was nominated for a position in the Central Committee of the party.

In 1917, the publishing equipment was confiscated by the Baku Soviet of People's Commissars. After facing persecution following the April occupation in 1920, Oruj Orujov returned to Barda.

In the 1930s, Oruj Orujov was arrested and sent into exile. Later, he was pardoned and allowed to return. He died in 1954.
