= Muslim Magomayev =

Muslim Magomayev may refer to:

- Muslim Magomayev (composer) (1885–1937), Azerbaijani composer
- Muslim Magomayev (musician) (1942–2008), Azerbaijani opera and popular music singer
