= Jahan Talyshinskaya =

- Born: 9 February 1909; Lankaran, Russian Empire (present-day Azerbaijan)
- Died: 1 March 1967 (aged 58); Baku, Azerbaijan
- Genres: Folk
- Years active: 1927–1949

Jahan Mir Rzakhan qizi Talyshinskaya (Azerbaijani: Cahan Talışinskaya; 9 February 1909 in Lankaran – 1 March 1967 in Baku) was an Azerbaijani folk singer and theatre actress.

== Early career ==
Born in Lankaran to a wealthy noble family, from her maternal side, she was the niece of General Samad bey Mehmandarov. Talyshinskaya first studied at Maryam Bayramalibeyova's Uns School for Girls, and moved to Baku at the age of nine to attend the Azerbaijani Girls Seminary. While residing at her older sister Bilgeys's house, she learned how to play the piano and the tar with no professional instruction. Her exceptional ear for music and voice was quickly gaining her fame as an amateur mugham singer and in 1934, she became a soloist at the Azerbaijan Philharmonic Society. She travelled to Azerbaijan's remote rural regions to collect samples of folk music, many of which would later be performed publicly for the first time. By 1936 she had given concerts in Moscow, Leningrad and Kiev, and had released a gramophone record.

== Exile and later life ==
After the arrest and exile of her ex-husband, brother, sister and two brothers-in-law in 1937 during the Stalin Purges, Talyshinskaya was treated by government institutions with suspicion, sometimes to a point of being refused permission to go on tour. Despite being recognized as an Honoured Artist of Azerbaijan in 1940, Talyshinskaya and her fourteen-year-old son Nazim were eventually exiled to Petropavlovlsk, Kazakhstan as "enemies of the people" in 1942. She was later permitted to settle in Tashkent, Uzbekistan, where she managed to continue her career at the local philharmonic society. She soon met with the member of the USSR Council of Ministers Arts Committee and future Deputy Minister of Culture Vladimir Surin who had happened to know Talyshinskaya from a pop music contest in Moscow, in which she had participated and won back in 1938. Following his approval, she left Tashkent for Tbilisi, Georgia to perform at the Tbilisi Azeri Drama Theatre, and later (at the insistence of director Shamsi Badalbeyli) at the Azerbaijan Musical Comedy Theatre, where she proved to be an outstanding comedy actress. In 1949, her case was revoked and she was exiled to Central Asia for the second time. Talyshinskaya and her son were exonerated shortly after Soviet premier Joseph Stalin's death but continued to live in Tashkent until the devastating earthquake of 1966 destroyed their house. They immediately returned to Baku where Jahan Talyshinskaya died a year later of heart failure, while playing the piano.

== See also ==
- Hagigat Rzayeva
- Munavvar Kalantarli
- Yaver Kelenterli
- Gulyanag Mammadova
