= Printing and Publishing House of Orujov brothers =

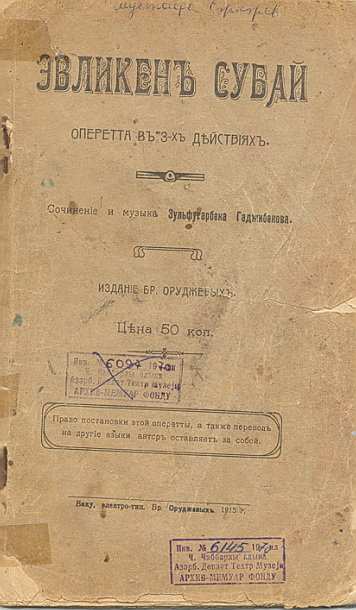
- Libretto of Z. Hajibeyovs operetta "The Married Bachelor", published by Orujov brothers in 1915
- Built: 1906
- Location: Baku
- Coordinates: 40.36826667795253°N 49.833084603445464°E
- Industry: Publishing
- Products: the newspaper "Sun" (1910-1911), works of the classics of Azerbaijani, Russian and European literature, libretto of operas and operettas
- Address: Nikolaevskaya Street,
- Owner(s): Oruj, Ganbar and Abuzar Orujov
- Defunct: 1917

Printing and Publishing House of Orujov brothers functioned from 1906 to 1917 in Baku. It belonged to the brothers Oruj, Ganbar and Abuzar Orujov. The enterprise possessed modern and complete equipment, including a Millet typesetting machine, Frankenthal, Augsburg, American printing presses, cutting tools, zinc printing machines, etc. The printing house was located in the basement of the Muslim Girls' school of H. Z. Tagiyev.

The Printing and Publishing House of Orujov brothers published literature in Azerbaijani, Russian and European languages – the works of Azerbaijani, Russian and world classics literature: the collections of poems "The Sun of the West" by Abbas Sakhhat, "Bahadur and Sona" by Nariman Narimanov, "Receipt of Paradise" by Yusif Vezir Chemenzeminli, "The Prisoner of the Caucasus " by Lev Tolstoy (translated by T. Tairov), "Poor Liza" by Nikolai Karamzin (translated by A. Abbasov), “The Imaginary Invalid” by Moliere (translated by A. Melikov-Gamarlinsky), “The Prince and the Pauper” by Mark Twain (translated by A. Ibrahimzade), “Robinson Crusoe” by Daniel Defoe (translated by Abdulla Shaig) and others. From 1910 to 1911, the newspaper "The Sun" (publisher - Oruj Orujov).

== History ==
The brothers Oruj, Gambar and Abuzar sold the property left over from their father in Barda and moved to Baku. With this money, they rented an apartment in the city. In the fall of 1906, they brought a typewriter from Warsaw to open a printing house. After opening it, they also created a bookstore network and published catalogues. The publishing house was located on Nikolaevskaya Street in a building that belonged to Haji Zeynalabdin Taghiyev. The enterprise possessed modern and complete equipment, which included a Millet typesetting machine, Frankenthal, Augsburg, American printing presses, cutting tools, zincography machines, etc.

In addition to translations of works, the folk literature was also published there. In 1910, the printing house published the book "A Check for Twenty-Five Million" by the American writer Mark Twain. This was the first work of the writer translated into Azerbaijani. In 1917, the work "Amir Timur" by the Hungarian orientalist Arminius Vamber was also published. The printing house of the Orujov brothers also published religious works that were ordered by the clergy, such as "The Book of Sharia" (1909), "Reasons for the Division of Islam" (1914), and "Lessons of Sharia" (1915).

The printing house also actively worked with Uzeyir Hajibeyov. His works "Arshin Mal Alan," "Harun and Leila," "Asli and Kerem," and "If Not That One, Then This One" were published here. On 14 February 1912, Uzeyir Hajibeyov concluded an agreement with Abuzar Orujov on publishing the operetta "If Not That One, Then This One" and selling it on the day the operetta was shown at the box office. Hajibeyov was also given an honorarium of 150 manats and 10 copies of the libretto.

Books published in the Orujev brothers' printing house were also donated to the country's libraries. Gambar Orujev was advertising the publishing house. He placed various advertisements in the newspapers for the works they published. The brothers also built a customer network. Mirza Alakbar Sabir, an outstanding Azerbaijani poet, also worked in the printing house as a proofreader. In 1917, the Baku Council of People's Commissars closed the publishing house under the pretext of nationalization. After the proclamation of the Azerbaijan Democratic Republic, on 18 September 1919, the printing house was revived again. Azerbaijan's Ministry of Public Education allocated 468,380 manats to the publishing house. However, after the occupation of Azerbaijan, the publishing house was closed, and the brothers returned to Barda. Oruj Orujov was repressed. He was exiled together with Ruhulla Akhundov. Later, he was rehabilitated and returned to Azerbaijan. Oruj Orujov died on 2 March 1954.

== See also ==
- Azernashr

== Literature ==
- Ahmad, Dilgam (2017). Fərqlilər. Baku: TEAS Press. ISBN 9789952494686.
