= Yaver Kelenterli =

Azerbaijani singer (1902–1979)

- Yavər Kələntərli
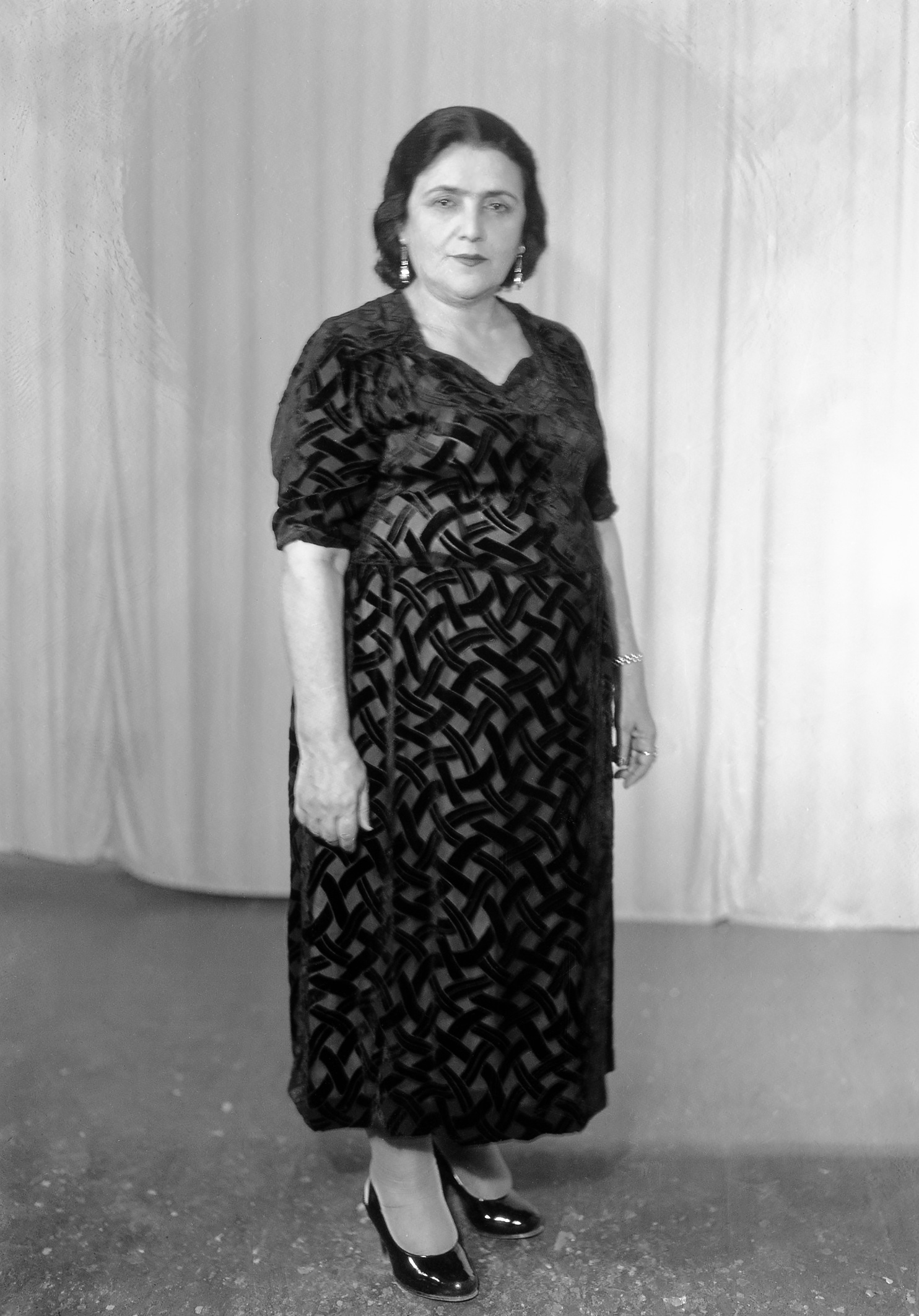
- Born: Yaver Ali gizi Zamanova; March 26, 1902; Shamakhi, Baku Province, Russian Empire
- Died: February 5, 1979 (aged 76); Baku, Azerbaijani SSR, USSR
- Other names: Yaver Abbas Ghizi Kelenterli, Yavar Kalantarli
- Occupation: Singer
- Spouse: Khodawerdi Kelenterli
- Awards: Honored Artist of the Azerbaijan SSR (1939)

Yaver Kelenterli (Azerbaijani: Yavər Kələntərli; Russian: Келентерли, Явер) (1902–1979), née Yaver Ali gizi Zamanova, also spelled as Yavar Kalantarli, was an Azerbaijani Soviet khananda singer of mugham, an Azeri music genre. In 1939, she was celebrated with the title Honored Artist of the Azerbaijan SSR.

== Biography ==
Yaver Ali gizi Zamanova was born on March 26, 1902, in Shamakhi, Baku Province, Russian Empire (present day Azerbaijan). She was married to Khodawerdi Kelenterli. Kelenterli met composer Muslim Magomayev in 1924, who inspired her career in music.

Kelenterli was a soloist of the Azerbaijan Radio from 1932 to 1937; and the Azerbaijan State Academic Opera and Ballet Theater from 1937 to 1941 and again in 1945 to 1951. Some of her notable mugham opera roles included in Leyli and Majnun by Uzeyir Hajibeyov (in the role of Leila's mother, Leila); Asli and Karam by Uzeyir Hajibeyov (as Asali); and "Shah Ismail" by Muslim Magomayev (as Arabzangi). In addition to the mughams, Kelenterli also performed Azeri folk songs.

She died on February 5, 1979, in Baku.

== See also ==
- Munavvar Kalantarli
- Hagigat Rzayeva
- Jahan Talyshinskaya
