= Javad bey Malik-Yeganov =

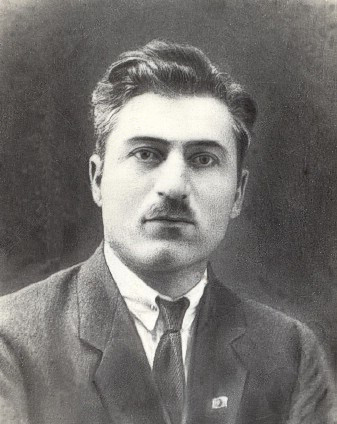

Governor-General of Lankaran
- In office June 1919 – 28 April 1920

Personal details
- Born: 1878 Tugh, near Hadrut, Elisabethpol Governorate, Russian Empire (present-day Azerbaijan)
- Died: 1942 (aged 63–64) Karelo-Finnish SSR, USSR
- Party: Musavat
- Spouse: Maryam Bayramalibeyova
- Children: Azera Malik-Yeganova; Taliya Malik-Yeganova; Asiman Malik-Yeganova

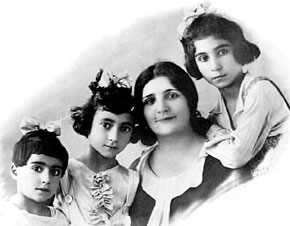
Javad bey's wife Maryam Bayramalibeyova and their three daughters

Javad bey Rza bey oghlu Malik-Yeganov (Azerbaijani: جواد بگ رضا بگ اوغلی ملک ییگانوف, Cavad bəy Rza bəy oğlu Məlik-Yeqanov) (1878, Tuğ – 1942, Karelia) was an Azerbaijani politician and Governor-General of Lankaran during Azerbaijan's independence in 1918–1920.

== Early life ==
Malik-Yeganov was born in the village of Tugh, situated in what is now Khojavend Rayon of Azerbaijan, to the Malik-Yeganov family. After being homeschooled, he arrived in Baku in 1903 to work in the oil fields. He joined the Muslim Social Democratic Party and within several years became known as an outspeaking socialist among Baku's oil workers. He was ordered imprisoned for one year in 1909 and temporarily refused the right to stay in Baku. Upon his release he returned to his native Tugh to continue his education and established contact with prominent scholars of neighbouring Shusha, one of the largest cultural centres of the Caucasus. He returned to Baku in 1914 and was hired as a clerk at the Shibayev and Co. oil company. That same year he joined the Musavat Party and enrolled in an undergraduate technical school. During that period he acquired several languages in addition to those he had already known. By the time of Azerbaijan's independence in 1918 besides his native Azeri Malik-Yeganov was fluent in Russian, German, Persian, Armenian, and Georgian.

== Career in the Democratic Republic of Azerbaijan ==
In 1917, Javad Malik-Yeganov was elected in the Transcaucasian Sejm as a representative for the South Caucasus' Azeri community. A year later he was among the Azerbaijani politicians who were members of the Azerbaijani National Council who signed the Declaration of Independence of 28 May 1918 proclaiming Azerbaijan's sovereignty, and became one of Members of Parliament of the newly founded state. On 10 March 1919 he was included in the committee in charge of investigating and reporting on the economic problems of Baku's working class. In June 1919 he became Governor-General of Lankaran after the fall of the British-backed Provisional Military Dictatorship of Mughan and its successor, the Mughan Soviet Republic. His brief governance was marked by major social developments in Azerbaijan's southeastern regions, including the opening of new schools, libraries and cultural clubs, as well as the encouragement for girls to receive education. He also managed to reconcile the local Azeri population with the pro-Bolshevik representatives of the local Russian community and the Armenian volunteers who fought on their side. Malik-Yeganov remained in that position until Azerbaijan's Sovietization on 28 April 1920.

== Career in Soviet Azerbaijan ==
Unlike many members of Musavat, Javad Malik-Yeganov did not choose to emigrate after the establishment of the Soviet rule in Azerbaijan. He immediately fell under suspicion in the eyes of the Communist leaders. In the next 18 years he would be imprisoned 6 times. In the 1920s he worked in the construction trust, employment exchange office, department for refugee affairs at the State Labour Commissariat and other government institutions of the Azerbaijan SSR. In 1933 he was accused of being a secret member of Musavat and arrested. The court ordered him exiled to the Karelo-Finnish SSR (present day Karelia, northern Russia) to a correctional camp, where he died 9 years later.

== Personal life ==
While being Governor-General, Malik-Yeganov visited the Russian-Muslim School for Girls in the city of Lankaran where he met the young teacher and feminist Maryam Bayramalibeyova. The two got married in 1920 and settled in Baku the following year. They had three daughters: Azera, Taliya and Asiman. Following Malik-Yeganov's final arrest in 1933, the government persecuted his entire family, including his wife who got exiled to Arkhangelsk in the far north of European Russia. Many of his relatives, including his three daughters, changed their surnames in order to avoid the purge.

Javad Malik-Yeganov was exonerated in 1957.
