= Foggy Tabriz =

Azerbaijani romantic novel

Foggy Tabriz, Azerbaijani: Dumanlı Təbriz, Persian: تبریز مه آلود, is an Azerbaijani romantic novel by Mammed Said Ordubadi. The main plot of the novel occurs in Tabriz, north west of Iran, during constitutional revolution and Occupation of Tabriz by Russian army in early 20th century. The major concern of the book is constitutional revolution behind a romantic story. It is originally written in Azerbaijani and has been translated twice into Persian; once by Saeed Moniri and then by Rahim Raeisinia. In Raeisinia's translation, the translator compared the story plot with historical evidence and criticizes some of the book's contents. According to Raesinia's comments - except extreme unrealistic exaggeration of the role of Russian red revolution and communism affect and their promotion on Iranian constitutional revolution - the rest of book is more or less in agreement with historical evidences. This book has also neglected the support and attempts of American teacher of Tabriz's Memorial School, Howard Baskerville, on the political movements in Iran during the period. Instead the book has a virtual American young woman who has no idea about Tabriz revolution.
