= Huseynagha Hajibababeyov =

Azerbaijani opera singer

Huseynagha Sultan oghlu Hajibababeyov (Azerbaijani: Hüseynağa Hacıbababəyov; 19 May 1898 – 10 November 1972) was an Azerbaijani opera singer. He was awarded the title, People's Artiste of the Azerbaijan SSR (1938). He was the grandfather of jazz composer and pianist, Salman Gambarov.

== Biography ==
Huseynagha Hajibababeyov was born in 1898 in Shamakhy, Russian Empire.

He had a soft-tone voice and performed mugham and folk songs. From 1910 he sang in the Nijat Society choir in Baku, and from 1913 performed with the Shafa theater group. In 1916, he joined the Azerbaijani music troupe and played mainly female characters in the first Azerbaijani mugham operas, touring cities of the South Caucasus, Central Asia and Iran. Since 1920, he was a soloist of the Azerbaijan State Opera and Ballet Theatre and performed the parts of Shah Ismayil (Shah Ismayil by Muslim Magomayev), Garib (Ashig Garib by Zulfugar Hajibeyov), Khosrov (Khosrov and Shirin by Niyazi), and other parts in operas by European, Georgian, Russian, Armenian composers in the original languages. In 1928, he graduated from the Azerbaijan State Conservatory where his teacher was Russian opera singer Nikolai Speransky. In 1938, Hajibababeyov was awarded the title of the People's Artists of the Azerbaijan SSR.

== Roles played ==
Huseynagha Hajibababeyov is known for the following roles:

Role	Title	Author
Karam	Asli and Karam	Uzeyir Hajibeyov
Asgar	The Cloth Peddler	Uzeyir Hajibeyov
Shah Ismayil; Gulzar	Shah Ismayil	Muslim Magomayev
Alyar	Nargiz	Muslim Magomayev
Garib	Ashig Garib	Zulfugar Hajibeyov
Khosrov	Khosrov and Shirin	Niyazi
Saro	Anoush	Armen Tigranian
Tsar Berendei	The Snow Maiden	Nikolai Rimsky-Korsakov
Lensky	Eugene Onegin	Pyotr Ilyich Tchaikovsky
Count Almaviva	The Barber of Seville	Gioachino Rossini

== See also ==
- List of People's Artistes of the Azerbaijan SSR
