= Teymur Bayramalibeyov =

Teymur bey Bayramalibeyov (Azerbaijani: Teymur Bayraməlibəyov) (22 August 1863, Yeddioymag – 2 September 1937, Baku) was an Azerbaijani historian, teacher, and journalist.

== Life ==
Teymur bey Bayramalibeyov was born to a noble family in the village of Yeddioymag in the present-day Masally District of Azerbaijan but spent most of his life in Lankaran. He received his primary education at a local madrasah where among other disciplines he learned Arabic and Persian languages. He continued his education at the two-year Russian-Tartar School of Lankaran and a newly opened Russian school in Tiflis (present-day Tbilisi, Georgia) where he was sponsored by philanthropists from the Baku Land Department. In 1879 he applied and was admitted to the Gori Pedagogical Seminary to receive his post-secondary education as a teacher.

== Career ==
After graduating from the seminary, Bayramalibeyov was hired to teach at one of Lankaran's Russian schools. At the same time, he worked as a Lankaran regional reporter for the Baku-based Russian-language newspaper Kaspi. In 1903 he started an amateur theatre where local teachers played roles in various staged plays. This was the theatre where Huseyn Arablinski revealed his talent in 1905 before going on to becoming a renowned Azerbaijani actor. Teymur Bayramalibeyov was the author of numerous historical books and articles, such as History of the Talysh Khanate, Lankaran in the Past and several works on the mythology, folklore and lifestyles of the Talysh people. In 1917 Bayramalibeyov helped his daughter Maryam Bayramalibeyova in establishing the Unas Russian-Muslim School for Girls in Lankaran and to become its first principal. In 1918, with the independence of the Azerbaijan Democratic Republic he became the regional representative of the Musavat Party in Lankaran. He participated in the negotiations with the British occupation forces in Azerbaijan in 1919. After Azerbaijan's Sovietization in 1920 he moved to Baku, where he worked as a secondary school instructor.
