= Khuraman Gasimova =

Azerbaijani opera singer and actress (born 1951)

Xuraman Qasımova
- Xuraman Əkrəm qızı Qasımova
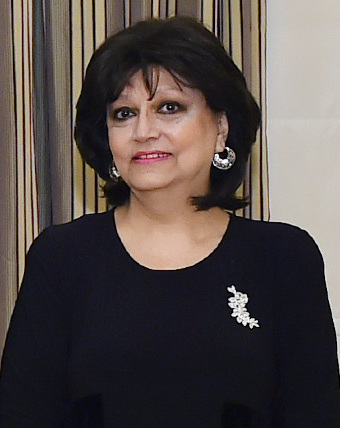
- Born: June 6, 1951 (age 75); Baku, Azerbaijan SSR
- Occupations: Opera singer; actress
- Years active: 1975–present
- Relatives: Fidan Gasimova (sister)

Khuraman Ahkram gizi Gasimova (Azerbaijani: Xuraman Əkrəm qızı Qasımova; born 6 June 1951) is an Azerbaijani soprano opera singer and actress who is known for winning the Maria Callas Grand Prix in 1982, and receiving a silver medal at the 7th International Tchaikovsky Competition in 1982. She was made a People's Artist of Azerbaijan in 1986 and was named to the Sheref Order in 2011.

== Early life and education ==
Khuraman Ahkram gizi Gasimova was born on June 6, 1951, in the Azerbaijani capital city of Baku. Her older sister Fidan Gasimova is also an opera singer. She attended the Baku Academy of Music, where her teachers included I. Lvovich and Shovkat Mammadova. Gasimova graduated from the academy in 1975.

== Career ==
A year after her graduation, she became a soloist at the Azerbaijan State Academic Opera and Ballet Theater.

She is known for performing both Western music and works by Azerbaijani composers, such as Fikret Amirov and Uzeyir Hajibeyov. In the standard opera canon, Gasimova's repertoire includes the roles of Mimi and Muzetta in La bohème, Desdemona inOtello, Tatiana Eugene Onegin and the titular role in Aida.

She has appeared in the films as The Elevator Operator Girl, But I Was Not Beautiful and The Life Examines Us.

In 1982, Gasimova began teaching at the Baku Music Academy. She became head of the solo singing department in 1993. She has been a professor at the Istanbul University State Conservatory since 1996.

The Gasimova sisters performed together in 1993 during the inauguration of Azerbaijani president Heydar Aliyev. In 2023, a concert at the Azerbaijan International Vocal Festival was dedicated to the sister. Khuraman attended the event and stated her gratitude to the organisers and performers.

In February 2026, she met with the Azerbaijan Culture Minister Adil Karimli to discuss reforms for modernizing arts education in the country.

== Awards ==
In 1981, Gasimova was awarded first prize and a Gold Medal at the Maria Callas Grand Prix, an international opera competition held in Athens. Following her win, the jury's leader, baritone Tito Gobbi, invited her to study in Florence. However, the Soviet Ministry of Culture refused to grant her permission to go. As a result of her win, she also automatically qualified for the 7th International Tchaikovsky Competition in Moscow the following year, where she received a silver medal.

In 1986, she was named a People’s Artist of Azerbaijan for her creative achievements. She also a recipient of the Lenin Komsomol Prize. On June 3, 2011 she was named to the Sheref Order (Order of Glory) by the President of Azerbaijan.

== Filmography ==
- From Heart to Heart (2007)
- Maestro Niyazi (2007)
- Film Director Hasan Seyidbeyli (2002)
- Our Sorrow…Our Pride (1998)
- Ring (1995)
- Constructors of the Future (1982)
- Land of Music (1981)
- Uzeyir’s Life (1981)
- The Life Examines Us (1972)
- But I Was Not Beautiful (1968)
- Gypsy Girl (1966)
