= Saadat Abdullayeva =

Azerbaijani musicologist-scientist

Saadat Abutalib gizi Abdullayeva
- Born: 18 January 1940; Baku, Azerbaijan SSR, Soviet Union
- Died: 12 March 2017 (aged 77); Baku, Azerbaijan Republic
- Citizenship: Soviet Union; Republic of Azerbaijan
- Occupation: Scholar

Saadat Abutalib gizi Abdullayeva (born 18 January 1940, Baku, Azerbaijan SSR - d. 12 March 2017, Baku, Azerbaijan Republic) was an Azerbaijani musicologist-scientist, ethno-organologist, pedagogue, doctor of art studies, and professor.

== Life ==
Saadat Abdullayeva was born in Baku in 1940. Her father, Abutalib Abdullayev, was a minister of Soviet Azerbaijan.

In 1957, she graduated from the Bulbul Music School and was admitted to the Baku Music Academy named after Uzeyir Hajibeyov. In 1962, she graduated from the conservatory, majoring in Azerbaijani folk music. In 1962–1971, she worked as a researcher in the music department of the Institute of Architecture and Art. In 1965–1967, she received post-graduate studies within this institute. In 1971–1979, she was a teacher and head teacher of the "History and Theory of Azerbaijani Folk Music" department of the Azerbaijan State Conservatory, and in 1979-1992 she was an associate professor. She became a professor in 2004 and worked in this department until 2017. She supervised the scientific work of 15 doctoral students. In 1978, she was elected a member of the Union of Composers of the USSR.

The basis of her research was the history of the development of Azerbaijani national musical instruments, the features of sounding and use, and the examination of the similarity of these instruments with the instruments of other Turkic nations. She is considered one of the founders of musical instrument studies in Azerbaijan.

She died on March 12, 2017, in Baku.

== See also ==
- Nargiz Aliyarova
