= Mammed Said Ordubadi =

Azerbaijani writer

Mammad Said Ordubadi
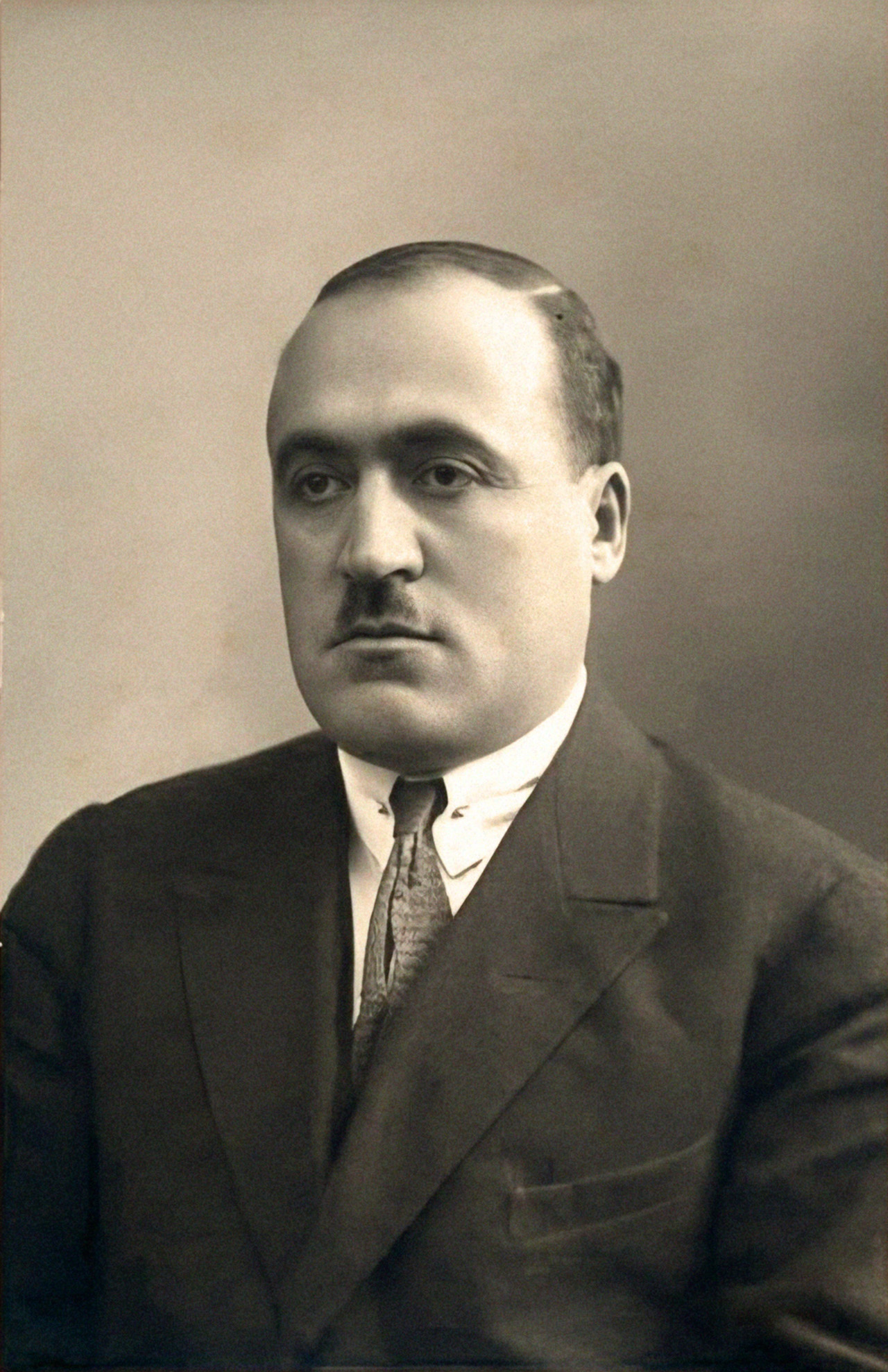
- Born: March 24, 1872; Ordubad, Erivan Governorate, Russian Empire
- Died: May 1, 1950 (aged 78); Baku, Azerbaijan SSR, Soviet Union
- Occupations: Writer, poet, playwright, journalist

Mammad Said Ordubadi (Azerbaijani: Məmməd Səid Ordubadi; 24 March 1872 – 1 May 1950) was an Azerbaijani writer, poet, playwright and journalist.

Ordubadi started his career as a poet. His articles and poetry were published in many of the Azerbaijani-language magazines of the time. During the Iranian Constitutional Revolution, Ordubadi joined the Muslim Social Democratic Party (Hummet). In 1911, he published Years of Blood, a collection of firsthand accounts of the clashes between Armenians and Azerbaijanis in 1905. In 1918, he joined the Communist Party, and his articles were published in the official newspaper of the Hummet Party. Along with the 11th Red Army, he went to Dagestan and published the journal Red Dagestan magazine there. He returned to Baku after the Sovietization of Azerbaijan.

Today, Ordubadi is remembered as one of the most important Azerbaijani intellectuals of the Soviet era. He served twice as a deputy of the Supreme Soviet of the Azerbaijan SSR, the highest legislative institution in the country. His novels include Sword and Quill, about the medieval poet Nizami Ganjavi, Foggy Tabriz, about the Iranian constitutional revolution, and also Mysterious Baku and Fighting City, which are both about the revolutionary activities of the Bolsheviks and the 26 Baku Commissars. He also published articles about the activities of Nariman Narimanov, the Azerbaijani national and communist leader.

== Biography ==
=== Early life ===
Mamed Gadži-aga oğlu was born on 24 March 1872 in Ordubad in the region of Nakhchivan, then part of the Russian Empire. He had one sister and his father died when he was seven. He was initially educated at a madrasa (an Islamic religious school) and later studied at Mahammad Sidgi's secular school called Akhtar (Star). Mahammad Sidgi was an intellectual well known for his educational activities in Russian Azerbaijan and the rest of Caucasus at the beginning of the 20th century.

=== Works ===
Ordubadi started writing in the 1890s. He published his first work in the Tiflis newspaper Shargi-Rus (Oriental Russia) in 1903. In his early publications, Ordubadi criticised ignorance, backwardness and religious fanaticism. In 1906, in Tbilisi he published a collection of his poems titled Gaflat (Ignorance), and in 1907 he published another poetry book titled Vatan va hurriyat (Fatherland and Freedom). He wrote for several Azerbaijani-language publications, including Molla Nasraddin, Irshad, Sada and others. Ordubadi covered various political, social and educational issues. He firmly stood for the necessity of the enlightenment of Azerbaijani society under Russian rule. In 1911, Ordubadi published the book Ganli sanalar (published in English as Years of Blood in 2011), a collection of firsthand accounts of the Armenian-Tatar massacres in 1905–1906. In the 1910s, Ordubadi published several plays, stories and novels.

In 1914, the Russian authorities arrested and exiled him to Tsaritsyn. In 1918, he joined the Communist Party and returned to Baku in May 1920, after the Bolshevik conquest of Azerbaijan.

Ordubadi became the editor-in-chief of the newspapers Akhbar, Yeni yol, and Molla Nasraddin.

Ordubadi wrote extensively during the Soviet period. His works include novels, satires, plays, and librettos (to the operas Koroghlu, Nargiz, and Nizami). His famous works include Dumanli Tabriz (Foggy Tabriz, 1933–1948) and Gilinj va galam (Sword and Quill, 1946–1948). He wrote novels about the poets Nizami Ganjavi, Fuzûlî, Molla Panah Vagif, and Mirza Alakbar Sabir.

== Awards and legacy ==
Honours include;

- Lenin Award
- Medal of Honor.
- Several streets in Azerbaijan have been named after him
- Two museums have been set up in his honour in Ordubad and Baku.
- Ordubadi is buried in Khiyabanda.

== Publications ==
His publications include;

=== Books ===
- Years of Blood: A History of the Armenian-Muslim Clashes in the Caucasus, 1905-1906"
- Sword and Quill
- "Smoggy Tabriz"
- "Hidden Baku"
- "Fighting City"

=== Plays ===
His plays include;

- "The Garden of Eden or the Tragedy of Tehran,"
- "The Last Days of Andean, or the Surrender of Grenada."
- "Sabotajniks"
- "Religions"
- "October Revolution"
