= Shafiga Akhundova =

Azerbaijani composer (1924-2013)

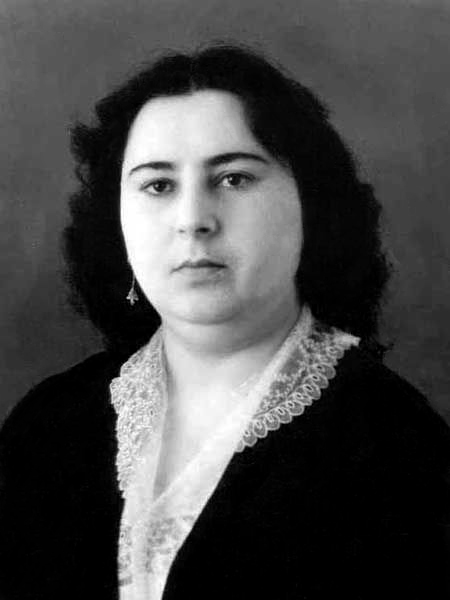

Background information
- Born: 21 January 1924; Shaki, Azerbaijan
- Died: 26 July 2013 (aged 89) Baku, Azerbaijan
- Occupation: Composer

Shafiga Akhundova (Azerbaijani: Şəfiqə Axundova; 21 January 1924 – 26 July 2013) was a prominent Azerbaijani composer, the first professional female author of an opera in the East and People's Artist of Azerbaijan. Akhundova was born into a family of an eminent cultural figure Gulam Akhundov in Shaki in 1924. Gulam Bagir oglu Akhundov, who was a public servant and intellectual of his time, worked as the first secretary of Shaki between 1917 and 1920, while her mother was a housewife.

In 1943–1944, Shafiga received her primary education at Baku Musical School named after Asaf Zeynally, where she was taught by Uzeyir Hajibeyov. Then, in 1956, she continued her education at Azerbaijan State Conservatoire named after Uzeyir Hajibeyov, where she graduated from the class of B. Zeydman. In 1998, Shafiga Akhundova was conferred a title of People's Artist of Azerbaijan and in 2004 she was awarded the Shohrat Order.

== Creative works ==
In 1972, Shafiga Akhundova composed her first opera “Galin gayasi” (Bride’s rock) So that she became the first woman in East history who composed an opera. She also composed such works as “Ev bizim, sirr bizim” operetta (1965), 600 songs such as "Leyla", "Bəxtiyar ellər", "Victory Anthem", "Victory is ours", "Motherland" and romantic pieces "What's Beautiful", "Jahanda by Nizami Ganjavi", music for spectacles for children ("Təlxəyin nağılı", "Dovşanın ad günü") etc. She composed music for more than 30 spectacles, staged in state theatres, dramatic theatres ("Aydın","Əlvida Hindistan!","Nə üçün yaşayırsan?").

== Awards ==
- Order of the Badge of Honour- 9 June 1959
- Honoured Art Worker of the Azerbaijan SSR- 26 November 1973
- People's Artist of Azerbaijan- 24 May 1998
- Personal Scholarship of the President of the Republic of Azerbaijan*- 11 June 2002
- Shohrat Order- 11 January 2002

== Filmography ==
- Azərbaycan elləri (1976)
- Mənim atam Əliövsət Sadıqov (2007)
- Bəstəkar Şəfiqə Axundova (2012)
