= Yuri Rozum =

Yuri Rozum Юрий Александрович Розум People's Artist of Russia
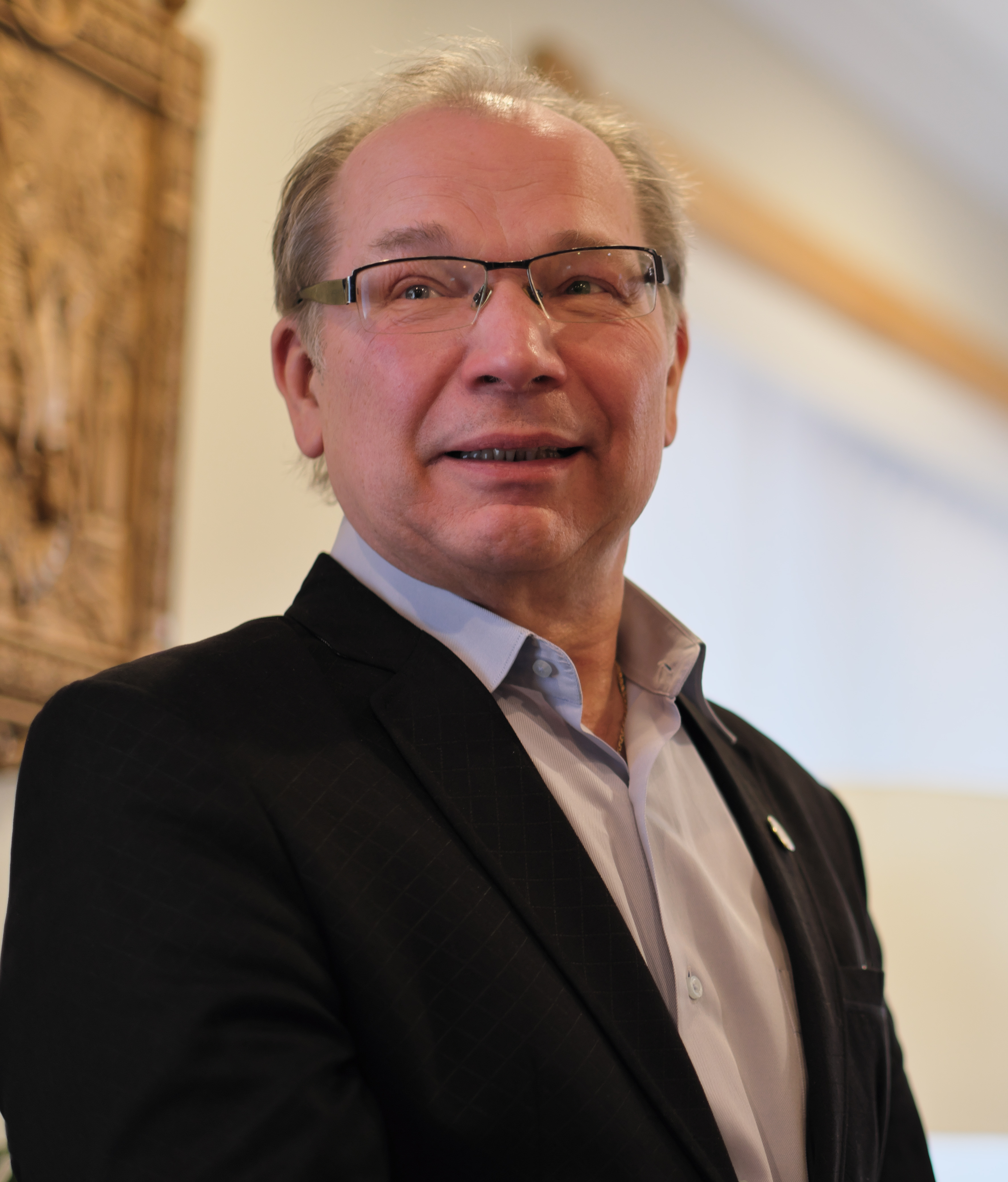

Background information
- Born: 22 February 1954 (age 72); Moscow
- Genres: Classical music
- Occupation: Pianist
- Instrument: Piano
- Label: Mediaphon
- Website: rozumfund.ru

Yuri Rozum (Russian: Юрий Александрович Розум; born 22 February 1954 in Moscow, USSR) is a Russian-born concert pianist and philanthropist.

Rozum was born to famous musical parents. His father was baritone Alexander Rozum and his mother was Galina Rozhdestvenskaya, conductor of the Russian Academic Folk Choir. Both were recipients of the title of People's Artist of the USSR.

When Rozum was only age seven, his mother discovered that he had perfect pitch, leading to his immediate enrolment in the Central Music School of the Moscow Conservatory, where he would later study under Lev Naumov and Yevgeny Malinin, themselves students of Heinrich Neuhaus.

Rozum developed an interest in philosophy by age fourteen, becoming especially interested in the works of the exiled Nikolai Berdyayev. From there, Rozum became extremely spiritual, leading life as an ascetic and, at the risk of his own freedom, immersing himself in the works of Alexander Solzhenitsyn.

In 1975, at the age of twenty-one, Rozum was selected to compete in the Queen Elisabeth Competition in Brussels. Due to political reasons, Soviet authorities denied his visa and almost immediately drafted him into the military where he would be totally separated from performing on piano for eighteen months.

By 1979, changes in policy allowed him to travel abroad, but mostly within Soviet-controlled Eastern Europe. After the fall of the Soviet Union, Rozum immediately began performing in Western venues.

In 2001, Yuri Rozum was awarded the title People's Artist of Russia by Russian president Vladimir Putin. Polls taken by Russian media place Rozum within that country's list of "Top Ten Classical Musicians in Russia."

In 2003, Rozum became the first pianist to perform a recital in the Main Hall of the Russian Federation Government House.

Rozum founded the 'Yuri Rozum International Charitable Foundation' in April 2005, as a means of providing scholarships to promising young musicians as well as the promotion of major annual music festivals.
