= Alpout, Barda =

Alpout
- Municipality
- Location within Azerbaijan Location within Karabakh Economic Region
- Coordinates: 40°19′35″N 47°12′18″E
- Country: Azerbaijan
- Rayon: Barda

Population
  - Total: 1,323
- Time zone: UTC+4 (AZT)
  - Summer (DST): UTC+5 (AZT)

Alpout (also, Alpaut) is a village and municipality in the Barda Rayon of Azerbaijan. It has a population of 1,323.
