= Dinara Alieva =

Azerbaijani operatic soprano (born 1980)

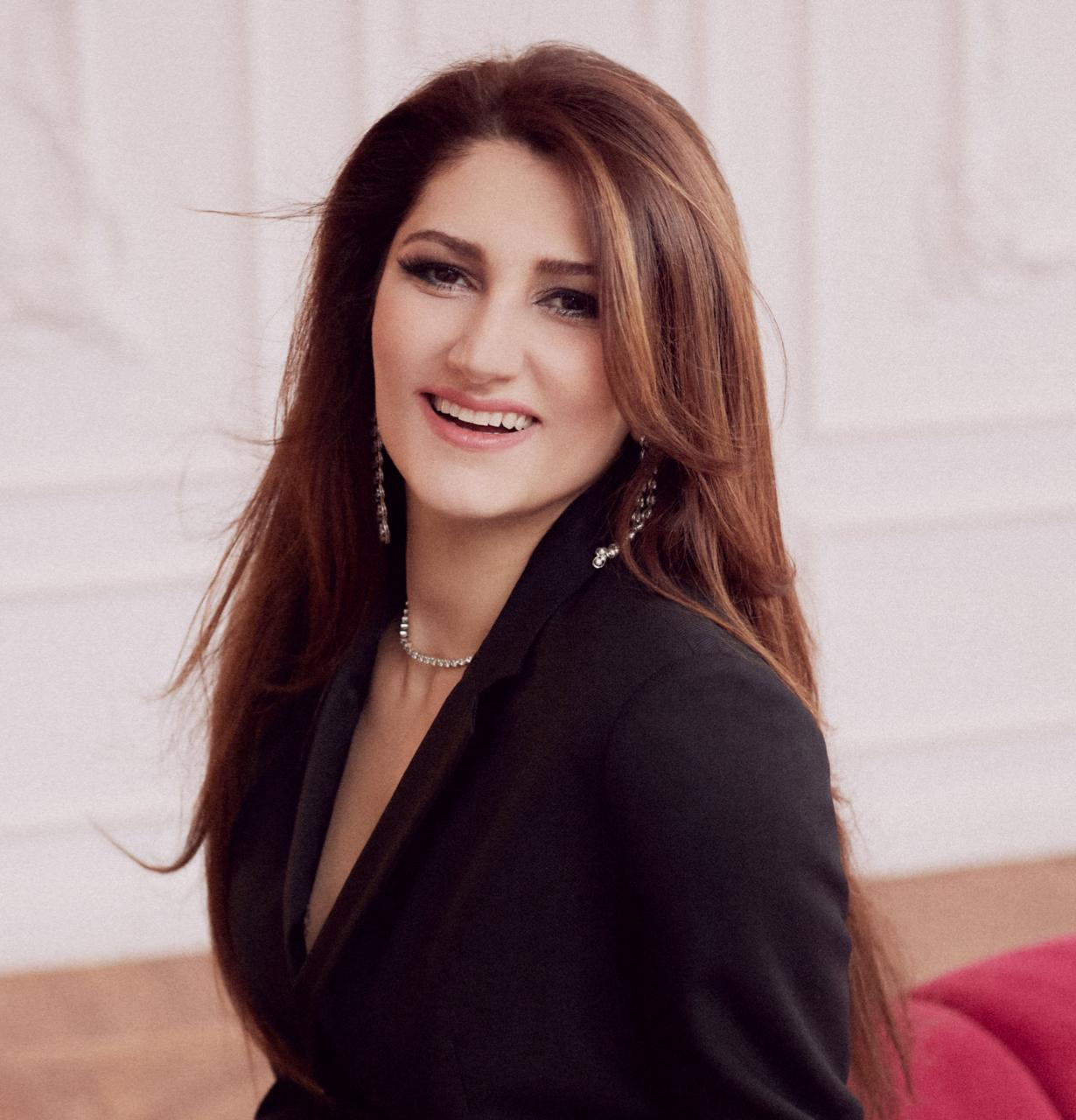

Background information
- Born: 17 December 1980 (age 44); Baku, Azerbaijan
- Years active: 2002–present
- Website: dinaraalieva.com

Dinara Alieva (Azerbaijani: Dinarə Əliyeva, Russian: Динара Алиева) (born December 17, 1980, in Baku, Azerbaijan SSR) is an Azerbaijani and Russian opera singer (soprano). She is currently a soloist at the State Academic Bolshoi Theatre of Russia, where she made her debut in 2009 as Liù in Puccini's opera Turandot. People's Artist of Azerbaijan (2018).

== Biography ==
Dinara Alieva graduated from the music college's piano class. In 2004, she graduated from the Baku Academy of Music. She then began her career at the Azerbaijan State Academic Opera and Ballet Theater where she was a soloist until 2005, singing leading roles from the soprano repertoire: Leonora (Verdi's Il trovatore), Mimi (Puccini's La Bohème), Violetta (Verdi's La Traviata), Nedda (Leoncavallo's Pagliacci).

Dinara Alieva has been a soloist at the Bolshoi Theater of Russia since 2009. The singer's repertoire at the Bolshoi Theater includes the following roles: Rosalinda (Die Fledermaus by J. Strauss) – premiere; Mimi (La Bohème by G. Puccini) – premiere; Marfa (The Tsar's Bride by N. Rimsky-Korsakov); Michaela (Carmen by G. Bizet); Violetta (La Traviata by G. Verdi); Iolanta (Iolanta by P. Tchaikovsky); Elizabeth Valois (Don Carlos by G. Verdi); Amelia (Un ballo in maschera by G. Verdi), the title part (Rusalka by A. Dvorak) – the first performer at the Bolshoi Theater.

Among other notable achievements, Alieva participated in the concert performance of La traviata at the Thessaloniki Concert Hall, dedicated to the 30th anniversary of Maria Callas' death. On 16 September 2009, the anniversary of Maria Callas’s death, Alieva performed at the Megaron Concert Hall in Athens where she sang arias from La traviata, Tosca, Pagliacci. She participated in the gala concerts of Elena Obraztsova at the Bolshoi Theatre in 2008 and the Mikhailovsky Theatre in 2009.

== Awards and prizes ==
- 2010 — III Prize at the Plácido Domingo’s Operalia, The World Opera Competition (Milan).
- 2010 — Honored Artist of Azerbaijan (September 17, 2010) – for services to the development of Azerbaijani culture.
- 2018 — People's Artist of Azerbaijan (May 27, 2018) – for services in the development of Azerbaijani culture.
- Honour Medal from the Irina Arkhipova Foundation.

== Discography ==
- 2013 — Russian Songs & Arias (Naxos, CD)
- 2014 — Pace mio Dio …(Delos Records, CD)
- 2015 — Dinara Alieva in Moscow (Delos Records, DVD)
- 2015 — Alieva & Antonenko (Delos Records, CD)
- 2016 — Puccini: La Rondine (Magda de Civry; Deutsche Oper Berlin; Delos Records, DVD)
- 2018 — Giuseppe Verdi: Messa da Requiem. In memory of Dmitri Hvorostovsky (Conductor – Yuri Temirkanov, Delos Records, CD, DVD)
