= Munavvar Kalantarli =

Munavvar Kalantarli Münəvvər Kələntərli
- Born: 1912; Lankaran, Lenkoran uezd, Baku Governorate, Russian Empire
- Died: February 1963 (aged 50–51); Baku, Azerbaijan SSR, USSR
- Occupation: actress

Munavvar Samad qizi Kalantarli (Azerbaijani: Münəvvər Kələntərli) (1912, Lankaran – 1962, Baku) was an Azerbaijani actress and folk singer.

== Life ==
Munavvar Kalantarli was born in 1912 in Lenkoran. She received her education in Lenkoran and moved to Baku at the age of 17. Possessing a beautiful voice, Munavvar Kalantarli, along with her brother Hashim, performed folk songs such as "Aman nene," "Kishmiri shal," and "Lolo" at concerts. She also sang mugham with the accompaniment of musicians like tar player Qurban Pirimov, kamancha player Gilman Salahov, and accordionist Teymur Demirov. Composer Muslim Magomayev, who took notice of her talent, invited her to the Opera Theater in 1933, marking the beginning of Munavvar Kalantarli's stage career from that year onwards. In 1937, she got married and gave birth to a daughter. Having had to choose between her career and her personal life, Kalantarli divorced her husband when their daughter was still a toddler.

== Career ==
=== Stage career ===
In the early 1930s, Munavvar Kalantarli moved to Baku to work at the Azerbaijan State Opera Theatre, where, together with Yavar Kalantarli and Munavvar's brother Hashim, she performed folk songs. Munavvar Kalantarli created the characters of Leyli and Leyli's mother in U. Hajibeyli's opera "Leyli and Majnun", Asli in "Asli and Karam" and Sanam in "O olmasin, bu olsun" at the Azerbaijan State Opera Theatre. Prior to becoming an actress, Munavvar Kalantarli had not received professional training in acting. Nevertheless, her artistic personality, natural talent, and good sense of humour soon got the attention of theatre directors, and in the mid-1930s she was offered a job as an actress at the Azerbaijan Musical Comedy Theatre. The actress continues her work at the Musical Comedy Theater with her own desire, where she plays F. Amirov's "Gozun aydin", S. Alasgarov's "Star", T. Guliyev's "Gold Digger", S. Rustamov's "Crane", A. Rzayev's "Journey to the Moon" etc. were performed successfully.

=== Movie career ===
Munavvar Kalantarli began her film career with the role of Aunt Jahan in the movie "The Cloth Peddler", which was released in 1945 and was shown in 136 countries around the world. The film was publicly screened in Moscow in 1946, was awarded the USSR State Prize. The making of this film was of great importance for the entire Azerbaijani people at that time. The shooting of "The Cloth Peddler" began with Stalin's permission at a time when Armenians were trying to master this famous work of Uzeyir Bey. After this film, the actress appeared in more than 10 feature films, a number of short films and documentaries produced by "Azerbaijanfilm" film studio. The roles he played in the movie studio were always filmed with a double. That's why Adil Iskandarov used to say that, Mina, this community (he meant the directors, assistant directors, and cameramen of the films he was shot in) rests with you the most. In 1953, Munavvar Kalantarli was appointed deputy director of "Vatan" cinema. After that, he leaves the theater, but only films.

Later, Munavvar Kalantarli appeared as Gulzar aunt in the musical "Bakhtiyar", Dagmara's mother Sonu in "Labor and Rose", Gulbahar grandmother in "Under The Scorching Sun", Munavvar in "Meeting", Yenga in "O olmasin, bu olsun", Malikov's stout wife in "Kazbek box", Mesma in "Shadows crawling", and housewife in "New Year's Eve". Overall she acted in 9 movies between 1945 and 1962. She quit theatre after being appointed assistant producer at the Vatan cinema in Baku. After that, she left the theater and appeared only in films.

Munavvar Kalantarli died in Baku after an unsuccessful surgery on her caecum.

== Filmography ==
- Agasadiq Garaybayli (1974)
- The Cloth Peddler (1945)
- The Lights of Baku (1950)
- Bakhtiar (1955)
- Labor and Rose (1962)
- Under The Scorching Sun (1957)
- Meeting (1955)
- O olmasin, bu olsun (1956)
- Kazbek box (1958)
- Shadows crawling (1958)
- New Year's Eve (1958)

== See also ==
- Yaver Kelenterli
- Jahan Talyshinskaya
- Hagigat Rzayeva
