= Fatma Mukhtarova =

Iranian–Soviet opera singer (c. 1890s–1972)

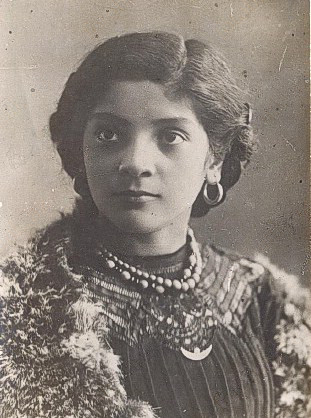

Background information
- Born: 26 March 1893; Urmia, Persia
- Died: 19 October 1972 (aged 79) Baku, Azerbaijan SSR, Soviet Union
- Genre: Opera
- Years active: 1914–1954

Fatma Sattarovna Mukhtarova (Azerbaijani: Fatma Muxtarova, Russian: Фатьма Мухтарова; 26 March 1893 or 1898 – 19 October 1972) was an Azerbaijani and Soviet opera singer (mezzo-soprano), Honored Artist of the Georgian SSR, and People's Artiste of the Azerbaijan SSR.

== Early years ==
Fatma Mukhtarova was born in Urmia, northwestern Persia (now West Azerbaijan province, Iran) to a Persian or Iranian Azeri father Abbas Rzayev and a Lipka Tatar mother Sara Chaseniewicz. Soon after their daughter's birth, the family moved to Russia and settled in Rostov-on-Don. In 1901, Mukhtarova's father, a street singer, died of tuberculosis at the age of 28 and her mother married organ-grinder, Sattar Mukhtarov, also an immigrant from Persia. The family lived in very poor conditions and moved repeatedly throughout Russia, until finally settling in Saratov in 1910. Mukhtarova's mother sent the young Fatma out amongst street singers, so she would be able to learn from them. The girl became known as 'Katya the Organ-Grinder', and performed publicly dressed in a Ukrainian costume, accompanied by accordion and tambourine. It is said that once while singing near a factory, she was noticed by young Lidia Ruslanova who worked there and who was so touched by Mukhtarova's voice, that she gave the young girl all the money she had on herself.

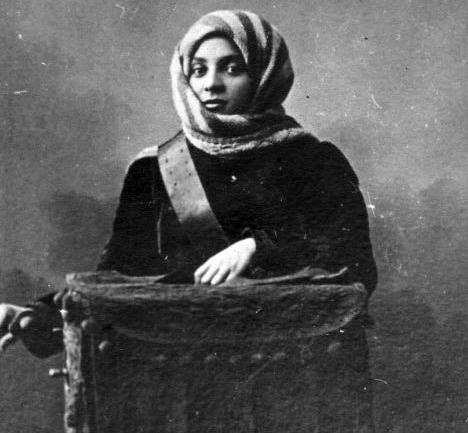
Katya the Organ-Grinder

A news story by journalist Arkhangelsky about young and talented Katya Mukhtarova soon appeared in the newspaper Saratovsky Vestnik. She was titled and housed by cello-player Kamensky, son of the Russian opera diva Maria Kamenskaya. But Mukhtarova felt she was treated like a servant in her teacher's home, who was only allowed to the master's table when guests from "high society" were visiting and needed to be entertained by her singing. Offended by this treatment, Mukhtarova left Kamensky's estate and continued to give charitable concerts in cities and towns of the Saratov Governorate, saving money for her future music education, as suggested by Arkhangelsky. In 1912, she attempted to enroll at the newly established Saratov Conservatory, but was rejected due to her "less than one-octave-range voice gone hoarse from singing in the cold". Fortunately, she was noticed by prominent opera singer Mikhail Medvedev who decided to train the young singer, and restored her voice within a couple of weeks. Fatma Mukhtarova was amongst the first students of the Saratov Conservatory. She continued to live with her parents and supported her family, by giving concerts in cities across the empire, despite the fact that the code of the Conservatory did not permit this. During one of such concert tours, in 1913, she visited Baku where she met opera singer Huseyngulu Sarabski. Sympathetic to her cause, Sarabski convinced the Baku oil magnate Murtuza Mukhtarov (the singer's namesake) to provide financial assistance to the struggling young singer.

== Professional career ==
Mukhtarova's first professional performance was in Prince Matthew's Headquarters at the Saratov City Theatre. After graduating from the conservatory in 1914, Mukhtarov married Saratov-based lawyer, Alexander Malinin, and soon gave birth to the couple's daughter, Leyla. Shortly afterwards, she left for Moscow where through her brother-in-law, Boris Malinin, she managed to audition in front of Feodor Chaliapin, and later Sergei Zimin. She accepted an offer to work for the Zimin Opera where she performed alongside Shalyapin in Boris Godunov and began rehearsals for Carmen which would later become her most outstanding role. In 1918, Mukhtarova returned to Saratov with a group of soloist where she debuted as Carmen at the Saratov Opera Theatre.

After the October Revolution, Fatma Mukhtarova acted in various theatres across Ukraine, the Volga region and the South Caucasus. Newspapers of the time noted the unusual naturalness and intensity of Mukhtarova's role as Carmen. During the 1924 tour in Baku, Georgii Nelepp acting as Jose accidentally thrust a knife into Mukhtarova's back three centimetres deep. This was revealed only during the final bows when blood was trickling down her skirt. In 1936, she became Honored Artist of the Georgian SSR.

From 1938, she worked for the Azerbaijan State Academic Opera and Ballet Theater.

In 1940, Mukhtarova was awarded the title of the People's Artist of Azerbaijan. She left the big stage in 1954 but continued to train young Azerbaijani opera singers. Her last performance took place at the Tbilisi Opera and Ballet Theatre.

== See also ==
- List of People's Artistes of the Azerbaijan SSR
