= Harun and Leyla =

Harun and Leyla published in 1915 in Baku

Harun and Leyla (Azerbaijani: Harun vә Leyla) – is the 6th and the last mugham opera composed by Uzeyir Hajibeyov.

The 5 acted opera was composed in 1915, but was not staged. Libretto of the opera was also written by Uzeyir Hajibeyov, based on an Arabic dastan of the same name.
