= Shovkat Mammadova =

Azerbaijani opera singer and teacher (1897–1981)

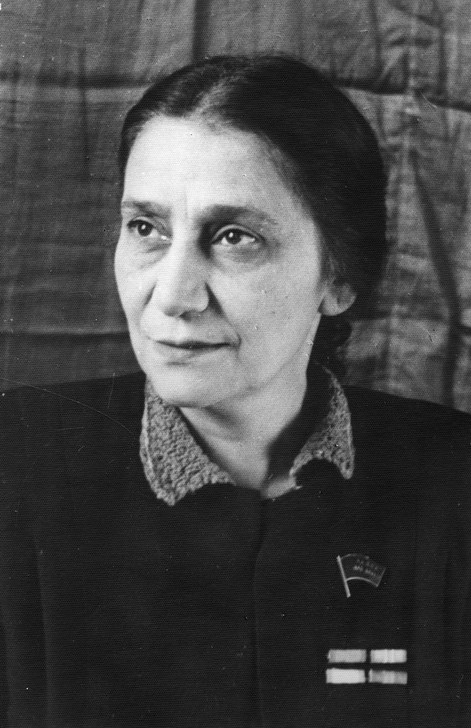
- Shovkat Mammadova

Background information
- Born: 18 April 1897; Tiflis, Russian Empire
- Died: 8 June 1981 (aged 84) Baku, Azerbaijan SSR, Soviet Union
- Genre: Opera
- Years active: 1912–1940s
- Spouse: Yakov Lyubarsky

Shovkat Hasan qizi Mammadova (Azerbaijani: Şövkət Məmmədova; 18 April 1897 – 8 June 1981) was an Azerbaijani opera singer (lyric coloratura soprano) and music instructor. She was named People's Artist of the USSR in 1938.

== Early life and musical career ==
Mammadova was born in Tiflis to the low-class Azeri family of Hasan Mammadov and Khurshid (née Sultanova). She had a younger brother named Mugbil. Her father, a shoemaker who hailed from the village of Goshakilsa (presently in the Bolnisi Municipality, Georgia), noticed her musical gift when Shovkat was six years old.

In 1910, he managed to find a sponsor, who agreed to promote her talent at a banquet organized by the vice-regent of the Caucasus, Count Illarion Vorontsov-Dashkov. In 1911, she left for Milan, Italy to pursue a musical degree at the Milan Conservatory with the financial help of an Azeri multimillionaire, Zeynalabdin Taghiyev and his wife Sona. However, in 1912, their sponsorship was discontinued for undisclosed reasons, and Mammadova had to return home. That same year she enrolled in a program at a music school in Tiflis. At the age of 15, she made her first stage appearance at the Taghiyev Theatre in Baku, performing a piece from Uzeyir Hajibeyov's Husband and Wife. In 1915, she got admitted to a post-secondary program at the Kiev Conservatory, where she met Reinhold Glière, a Russian composer.

Glière showed keen interest in Azeri folk music and Mammadova's acquaintanceship resulted in his visit to the Karabakh region, where he got to meet with a number of professional mugham performers. Later in 1934, he would compose his famous Shakh-Senem based on his impressions and experiences from this trip, and dedicate it to Mammadova. By that time, she was already widely known as a talented opera singer. Beginning in 1921, Mammadova toured Moscow, Saint Petersburg, Paris, Milan, Tabriz, and Tbilisi, performing arias from La traviata, The Barber of Seville, Rigoletto, Les Huguenots, etc. She also managed to complete her studies in Milan in 1927–1930 and head back to Azerbaijan to go on with her career at the State Opera and Ballet Theatre in Baku.

== Career as a music instructor ==
In 1923, Shovkat Mammadova founded the Musical Notes Publishing House as well as the Baku Theatrical College (nowadays known as the Azerbaijan State University of Culture and Arts). In 1939–1945, she was the director of the Azerbaijan State Opera and Ballet Theatre. She was later appointed the Chair of the Vocal Department at the Azerbaijan State Conservatory, where she professionally trained young vocalists until her death in 1981.

== Family ==
In 1915, while studying at the Kiev Conservatory, Mammadova married Yakov Lyubarsky, an engineer whom she had met in Milan three years earlier.

== See also ==
- List of People's Artistes of the Azerbaijan SSR
