= Maryam Bayramalibeyova =

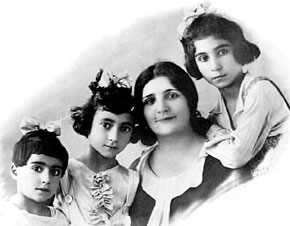
- Maryam Bayramalibeyova and her three daughters
- Born: 1898; Lankaran, Lenkoran uezd, Baku Governorate, Russian Empire
- Died: 1987 (aged 88–89); Baku
- Occupations: Activist, educator
- Spouse: Javad bey Malik-Yeganov
- Father: Teymur Bayramalibeyov

Maryam Teymur qizi Bayramalibeyova (Azerbaijani: Məryəm Bayraməlibəyova; 1898, Lankaran – 1987, Baku) was an Azerbaijani social activist, feminist, and educator.

== Early life ==
Maryam Bayramalibeyova was the daughter of Azerbaijani historian and journalist Teymur Bayramalibeyov and his wife Shirin (née Talyshinskaya), a Russian-educated Talysh-Azerbaijani who translated a number of works by classical Russian writers into Azeri and was famous for promoting Western culture in Lankaran and the neighbouring regions. In 1906 Maryam Bayramalibeyova was accepted to the Empress Alexandra Russian Muslim Boarding School for Girls in Baku and 7 years later, to Saint Nina's Secondary Boarding School. In 1917, she graduated from Saint Nina's with honours and was admitted to study medicine at Moscow State University. However, after the October Revolution, being a daughter of an upper-middle class literatus Bayramalibeyova considered her life to be in danger and returned to Lankaran (eventually she did manage to get a post-secondary education receiving an Honours B.A. in law from Baku State University later in 1931). In her native city in 1917, she established the first all-girls secular school (named Uns) in the entire uyezd (administrative unit in Czarist Russia) with the help of Teymur Bayramalibeyov, and became its first principal. The Bayramalibeyovs visited many families in Lankaran encouraging them to send their daughters to Uns. The courses were taught in the Russian language. In order to promote the arts, Maryam Bayramalibeyova organized drama, choir, and musical clubs in the school, which apparently was a success as two of her students later became prominent Azerbaijani actresses and one became a renowned mugham singer. In 1919, Bayramalibeyova founded the Lankaran Women's Charity Association.

== Personal life ==
During the period of political instability in the Talysh region Maryam Bayramalibeyova sent a letter to the Azerbaijan Democratic Republic-appointed Governor-General of Lankaran, Javad Malik-Yeganov asking him to protect the school from the mischievous soldiers of the pro-Denikin army. During his visit to the school Malik-Yeganov and Bayramalibeyova met personally and despite the 20-year difference in age, they got married in 1920 and had three daughters: Azera, Taliya and Asiman.

== Life in Soviet Azerbaijan ==
In 1925, four years after moving to Baku, Maryam Bayramalibeyova (then principle of a secondary school in Baku) she was chosen to represent Azerbaijan in the First All-Soviet Teachers Conference. While studying law at Baku State University she also translated works of Azerbaijani poets into Russian. In 1933, Bayramalibeyova's husband was arrested being suspected in being affiliated with the Musavat Party (ruling political party in the Democratic Republic of Azerbaijan in 1918–1920), and the family did not see him again. Five years later Bayramalibeyova herself was arrested on the same charge even though she never officially belonged to Musavat, and was forced to abandon her three children who would be looked after by their grandmother. She was sent in exile to a correctional camp in Arkhangelsk, northern Russia, where she performed hard physical labour; however due to her rich educational background was promoted to the position of a bookkeeper. When in the early 1940s she started losing her sight, she was sent to the Butyrka prison in Moscow under pretence of being provided medical help due to her condition. The help was never provided and soon she was shipped back to Arkhangelsk, and later to Karaganda, Kazakhstan. In 1948 having served her term, Maryam Bayramalibeyova, now practically blind, returned to Azerbaijan but was no longer able to continue her social work. In 1956, she was officially exonerated and in 1964 was granted a pension from the government.
