= Nargiz (opera) =

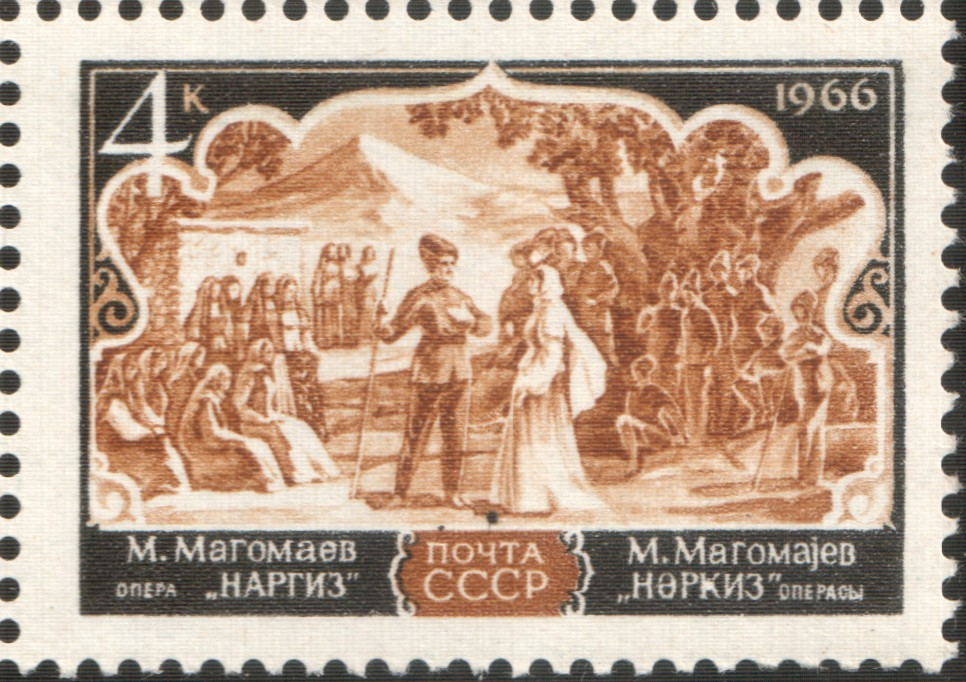
Scene from "Nargiz" opera.

Nargiz (Azerbaijani: Nərgiz) – is the second opera by Muslim Magomayev, Azerbaijani composer and Honored Art Worker of the Azerbaijan SSR, written in 1935. Mammed Said Ordubadi is the author of a libretto to the opera. It is considered the most significant composition of Muslim Magomayev. Music of the opera consists of folk songs of Azerbaijan. In 1938, the opera was shown during the Decade of Azerbaijani Arts in Moscow, with the editorship of Reinhold Glière. It is also noted that, the opera narrates about a struggle of Azerbaijani peasants for the Soviet Power. “Nargiz” is the first Azerbaijani opera on a modern theme.
