= Shah Ismayil (opera) =

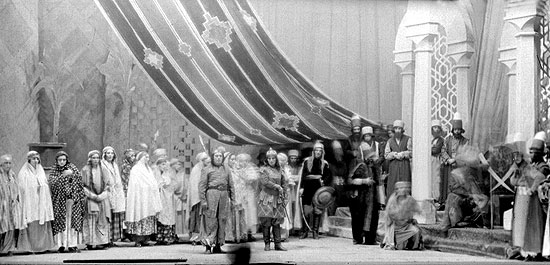
Scene from "Shah Ismayil" opera. Director - Abbas Mirza Sharifov, Artist - Roberg.

“Shah Ismayil” – is an Azerbaijani mugham opera in 6 acts and 7 scenes composed by Muslim Magomayev, in 1915-1919. Libretto and text were written by Mirza Gadir Ismayilzade basing on a legend about young Shah Ismayil.

Premiere of the opera was held in March 1919 in Baku, with a benefit performance of Huseyngulu Sarabski (Rzayev). Muslim Magomayev was conductor and Huseyn Arablinski (Khalafov) was director of the opera. Actors such as H.Sarabski (Shah Ismayil), M.H.Teregulov (Aslan Shah) and Huseynagha Hajibababeyov (Gulzar) played parts in the opera.

The second edition was created in 1924. Premiere was held on December 3, 1924 in Baku, at Azerbaijan State Academic Drama Theatre. Muslim Magomayev was its conductor and A.A.Tuganov director. Huseyngulu Sarabski (Shah Ismayil), M.H.Teregulov (Aslan Shah) and Khurshid Qajar (Gulzar) acted the parts. On November 20, 1929 the opera was again staged in Baku. And again Muslim Magomayev was its conductor. Abbas Mirza Sharifzadeh was the director and S.S.Serejin and V.V.Roberg were art directors of the opera. H.A.Hajibababeyov (Shah Ismayil) and Khurshid Qajar (Gulzar) acted the main parts.

In 1930, the third edition of the opera was written. Its premiere was held in Baku, in 1947. Ahad Israfilzade was conductor of the opera.

== Characters ==
Role	Voice type
Shah Ismayil	tenor
Aslan Shah, his father	baritone
Gulzar, Arabian beauty, lover of Shah Ismayil	soprano
Arab Zangi, hermitess	mezzo-soprano
Ibn Tahir	bass
Vizier	tenor
Abu Hamza, rich Bedouin-merchant	tenor
Arab	bass
Rammal	tenor
Traveler	tenor
Robber	tenor
Arabian warriors, courtiers and guests on the wedding.	

== Video ==
- Watch the opera "Shah Ismail" site YouTube
- The grandson Muslim Magomayev - Aria of Aslanshah from the opera "Shah Ismayil" site YouTube
