= Muslim Magomayev (composer) =

Azerbaijani composer

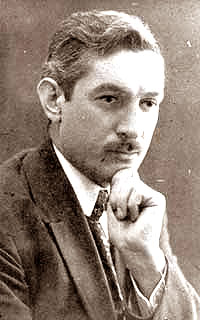
Muslim Magomayev (grandfather)

Abdulmuslim Muhammad oghlu Magomayev (Azerbaijani: Əbdülmüslüm Məhəmməd oğlu Maqomayev; 18 September 1885 – 28 July 1937), commonly known as Muslim Magomayev (Azerbaijani: Müslüm Maqomayev), was an Azerbaijani composer and conductor. He is the paternal grandfather and namesake of Azerbaijani opera singer Muslim Magomayev.

== Early life ==
He was born Abdulmuslim Magomayev into a family of a blacksmith on the same day another prominent Azerbaijani composer Uzeyir Hajibeyov was born. He studied at a primary school in Grozny before being admitted to the Gori Pedagogical Seminary (in present-day Georgia) in 1900. There, Magomayev developed a passion for music and conducting. That was also where he first met Uzeyir Hajibeyov, then his fellow student. However, Magomayev found the musical career financially unpromising and decided to focus on teaching. In 1905, he acquired his teaching certificate at the Tiflis Teachers' College and was appointed a teacher to the village of Bekovichi (now Kizlyar, Republic of North Ossetia–Alania). In 1906, he was voluntarily reappointed to Lankaran (present-day Azerbaijan). In 1911, he received a license that allowed him to teach in high schools and moved to a Baku suburb, Sabunchu. While teaching at a school, he took up music and conducting once again.

== Career ==
In 1916, Magomayev wrote his first opera entitled Shah Ismayil based on the homonymous Azeri folk epic. Unlike other early Azeri operas, Shah Ismayil was less focused on the ethnic musical component and embodied European opera styles. Magomayev's most major work was Nargiz. Written in 1935, this successful propaganda opera depicts Azerbaijani communists in their fight against the short-lived Azerbaijan Democratic Republic. Overall, Magomayev was the author of 15 musical compositions, mostly rhapsodies. In 1927, together with Hajibeyov, he published The Collection of Azerbaijani Folk Songs; a book where over 300 pieces of folk music had been documented in notes. In 1935 Muslim Magomayev was selected Honoured Arts worker of Azerbaijan SSR.

== Personal life ==
In 1905, Magomayev married Baydigul Jamal Teregulova (whose younger sister Maleyka later married Uzeyir Hajibeyov making the two composers relatives) and fathered two sons. In 1937, he died of tuberculosis while visiting Nalchik (Republic of Kabardino-Balkaria, Russia) and was buried in Baku. The Magomayev Azerbaijan State Philharmonic Society is named after Muslim Magomayev.

== Shah Ismayil ==
Muslim Magomayev’s mugham opera Shah Ismayil was composed in 1915-1916 and consists of 6 acts and 7 scenes. The libretto and text were written by composer Mirza Gadir Ismailzade. The premiere of the opera was held on March 7, 1919 in Baku, with a benefit performance of Huseyngulu Sarabski. Muslim Magomayev was the conductor and Huseyn Arablinski was the director of the opera. The actors were: H.Sarabski - Shah Ismail, M.H.Teregulov - Aslan Shah and Huseynagha Hajibababeyov – Gulzar.

== Nargiz ==
Nargiz is the second opera by Muslim Magomayev, written in 1935. Mammed Said Ordubadi is the author of a libretto to the opera. It is considered the most significant composition of Muslim Magomayev. The music of the opera consists of folk songs of Azerbaijan. In 1938, the opera was shown during the Decade of Azerbaijani Arts in Moscow, with the editorship of Reinhold Glière. It is also noted that, the opera narrates about a struggle of Azerbaijani peasants for the Soviet Power. “Nargiz” is the first Azerbaijani opera on a modern theme.

== See also ==
- Abbas Mirza Sharifzadeh
- Uzeyir Hajibeyov
- Azerbaijani composers
