= Bayram overture =

1956 overture by Soltan Hajibeyov

- by Soltan Hajibeyov
- English: "Bayram" overture
- Native name: "Bayram" uvertürası
- Other name: Overture for big symphony orchestra
- Year: 1956
- Style: sonata allegro

Premiere
- Date: 1956
- Location: Baku
- Conductor: Niyazi
- Performers: Azerbaijan State Symphony Orchestra

"Bayram" overture (or Overture for big symphony orchestra) is an overture written by Soltan Hajibeyov in 1956. The overture was performed for the first time in 1956 by the Azerbaijan State Symphony Orchestra under the leadership of conductor Niyazi at the first congress of Azerbaijani composers in Baku.

== Composition ==
=== Main theme ===
The composer's program idea is in sonata allegro form, which is traditional for the symphonic overture genre. The overture is based on the figurative contrast of two themes. At the same time, it is about juxtaposing cheerful musical playfulness (Note: Main theme) with lyrical singing. (Note: Secondary theme)

The main theme, which is played in one breath, is structured in three parts. The topic is divided into several small sections in the middle. The intonation basis of the theme is a motive consisting of three voices. The fast-paced motive is revealed by a continuous movement of sixteenths, gathering strength from the accents on the tonic. The triphonic motive is the main impulse that drives the next movement. It can concentrate on the main constructive idea of the work. Then, the motor skills of the music are reinforced by adding a semitone to the music. The orchestra also has its influence on this. Violins and woodwinds play the leading thematic role here. Bass strings – cello and contrabass actively accompany the theme. The brass band holds the harmonic function. Short staccatos, which are part of the melody and the precise rhythmic pattern of seconds in the accompaniment infuse the music with scherzo elements. Musicologist Zemfira Safarova notes that "This section as a whole is considered as a thematic variant that strengthens the beginning of the play, which is the basis of the character of the main theme.".

The development of the previous material continues in the second section on the middle of the main theme. Instrumentation is more camera-like. The number of instruments is reduced to a minimum. The scherzo character of the melody played on the strings is enhanced by passages of high-pitched thirds to the flute. A sequence-like development from the melodic direction leads to the final movement in the main body of the main theme, which is a development to the driving intonation of the beginning of the theme. After this repetition of intonation, a reprise is played.

The propulsive intonation repeats insistently, leading to a reprise of the main theme's opening material, culminating in a rapid movement of sixteenths. The character of the solemn holiday is strengthened by increasing the dynamics. Signs of repetition already begin to show from the last section in the middle of the theme. Gradually, woodwinds and then brass instruments are included in the orchestra. The volume rises to tutti in the reprise. The three minor sections that make up the middle section of the main theme are essentially variants of the same intonation layer. The absence of this melody in the opening stages of the theme plays a temporary independent role and gives clarity to the beginning of the theme.

According to musicologist Aida Taghizada, the main theme of the overture combines the characteristic features of the Azerbaijani dance and the theme of the march. The dance signs are not clearly given here. Music sums up its more typical features. This shows itself in the melodic structure of the beginning of the main theme. Its approximate schematic representation is as a b b c c. Such simple repetition is characteristic of several Azerbaijani folk dances. For example, folk dances such as "Tarakama", "Darçını" are examples of this.

In addition to simple repetition of the main theme of the overture, variant repetition of two or three motif cores is also used.

=== Secondary theme ===
The transition from the main theme to the secondary theme occurs organically. The last phase of the development of the main theme is characterized by the strengthening of dynamics. It then fades into a descending chromatic progression, leading to the overture's subsidiary theme.

In terms of music, the theme is compatible with the cantilena feature and declarative-speech expressiveness.

In contrast to the detailed expression of the main theme, the presentation of the secondary theme takes place horizontally, in a large plan. The development of the secondary theme is carried out in a wave-like way. Each of the waves begins in a higher register than the previous one. In this respect, the development of the secondary theme is to some extent similar to the mugham. Each subsequent branch of the mugham is built in a higher register than the previous one, thereby not only expanding the range boundaries of the melody but also achieving a general opening of the form. The method of transposition plays a major role in the wave development of the topic.

The secondary theme, first expressed in the "h" tonality, is then transposed into its dominant space. (Note: "fis" tonality) During this transition, although the inner essence of the theme remains unchanged, the absolute pitch of the melody changes. Its emotional color is updated, and the dynamics of the sound are strengthened.

The polyphonic factor also plays a role in the completeness of the development of the secondary theme. L. Karagicheva and M. Ismayilov write that "If the homophonic-harmonic structure is characteristic for the main theme, the nature of the melody of the secondary theme brings forth polyphony, which is one of the main factors in its development."

A new melodic line — thematic development of the secondary theme in the performance of the strings by the trumpets and vartornas – is added to the imitative. The gradual layering of registers and timbres, weigh down the polyphonic material. The strings continue to play the secondary theme, while the brass implements an imitation of it. The woodwind part is based on the harmonic texture of that fragment.

The form of the secondary theme is an extended modulated period. The first phrase ends on the sixteenth note, the dominant of B minor. The second phrase, which is asymmetrical in terms of the number of bars, modulates to the subdominant tonality of C minor. The transposition of the theme to the tonality of F-minor strengthens its dynamics. Continuing the development in successive waves, the secondary theme covers increasingly higher registers. It has an expressive character and seems to be directed upwards. In the climactic part of the development, the melody of the supporting theme suddenly breaks harshly.

The chord base of the loops that form the melodic framework of the secondary theme is the shur. h-Fis-cis and e-h-Fis are built on fifth tones. In the first ring, the dominant sound of fis, which is the reference step of the Bayati-Kurd section of the Shur mugham, plays the role of a strong center of attraction. The "h" sound on the second ring – the shur chord reference step with the tonic "e" is the center of attraction. Each of these reference steps has sounds surrounding it, which enable it to be specified as a reference step around that sound. This gives special relief to the structure of the secondary theme.

=== Elaboration section and scherzo motif ===
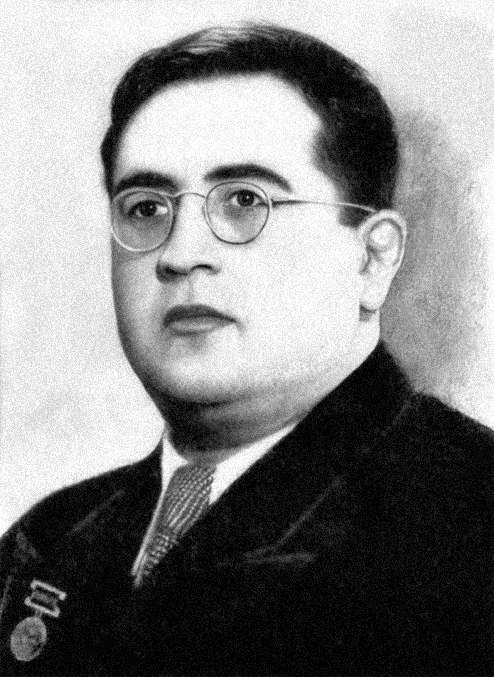
Soltan Hajibeyov

The general goal of the development section is to maximize the expressive possibilities of the main musical images. The composition of the development section consists of several sections based on the separate and joint development of the main and secondary themes. They are opened in a new way, and contrasting elements hidden within them are revealed.

The development section begins with a quiet, march-like, slightly grotesque-sounding theme played by the bassoon solo. It can be said that its basis is the initial intonation of the secondary subject, which is given in a reversed form. At the beginning of development, the number of tools involved is reduced to a minimum. Bassoon and flute have a thematic function, and strings have an accompanying function.

The next ring of the bassoon's theme is repeated by the solo flute. The subsequent alternation of the thematic function between these two instruments creates a peculiarly sharp characteristic dialogue. The difference in timbre and register of solo instruments plays a big role here.

Later, the scherzo motif of the main theme of the overture, played by flutes, and clarinets and accompanied by short passages of cellos, enters the development process of the piece. The theme of the scherzo, revealed in the different registers of the orchestra and the sound of the instruments, takes on a sharp character. Depending on the degree of strengthening of the dynamics, other tools are also included in the development process. With this, the composition of the orchestra increases. Repeated repetitions and rapidity of alternating solo instruments bring elements of humor to the expression. The light, fun, playful nature of the music softens the harsh tone at the beginning of the development section.

The intensity of development of the Scherzo motif leads to the creation of general movement forms. Outer registers – the part of string and woodwind instruments is enriched with rhythmic pulsation. In the middle register, the transparent polyphonic touch of separate intonation elements of the secondary theme is evident in the brass instruments. The theme of solo bassoon is important here. Its participation in this process is associated with the beginning of a new section each time.

In the first section, the increasing dynamics in the orchestral sound reaches its climax. Against the background of sharp trills of woodwinds and violins in the high register, the opening theme of the reworking section sounds in a dominant "fis" sound. In harmony with the low timbre of the strings, the loud, bright timbre of the brass instruments, staccato, and precise rhythm give it a tough character. The second section of the elaboration develops the intonation-thematic fragment of the secondary theme.

The development process moves upward with strong dynamics and stops at the pedal sound "a". The third section of this part begins. This section is based on the scherzo motif of the main theme. A. Taghizade notes that "This motif is smoothed out rhythmically. Exuberant notes disappear. The music acquires the character of bravery."

The harmonious unisons of the bass strings, brass and bassoon are answered by the chords of the brass band and the xylophone. Diatonicity of unisons emphasizes the chromatic fullness of chords. The emotional tension of the orchestral part is intensified by the pedal sound kept in the lower register of the woodwind and string instruments and sounds like a shade that darkens the heroic color of the theme. Heavy rides lead to a new section of development.

Firstly, its rhythmicity stabilizes. Against the background of precise, broken, dry chords of trumpets and trombones, a sad, passionate cantilena played by cellos attracts attention. Its intonation is based on the bassoon theme at the beginning of that section, based on the tonic "Shushtar" mugham. Relying on the sound order of the Shushtar dulcimer leads to the creation of characteristic harmonic complexes accompanying the theme.

The cello theme is associated with rhythmic mughams in the shikasta type. The distinguishing features of this genre between mugham and ashiq art are also present: the combination of improvised melody (Note: cello theme) with rhythmically precise measured accompaniment. (Note: chords of trumpets and trombones) The cello melody is then joined by the flute, bassoon, and clarinet playing a short, sharp rhythmic motif of the main theme. In the ostinato movement, the harmonies built on the dominant of C major and thereby strengthen it are repeated stubbornly. The harsh and sharp harmonies resulting from the layering of the chromatic moving bass complex over the dominant of C major are marked with a general pause, bringing the tension of the sound to the limit. This is followed by a light, jubilant reprise, confirming the main theme of the overture with its bright orchestral tutti and its pure C major key.

=== Thematic material ===
According to Zemfira Safarova "Soltan Hajibeyov fully addressed folk music in his overture music." However, Aida Taghizadeh, a researcher of S. Hajibeyov's creativity, rejects this idea and says that "Soltan Hajibeyov's music does not have signs of direct affinity with folklore."

The core of the main theme is the intonation based on the tonic of the "Mahur-Hindi" mugham, which is found in folk music, Qızılgül, Altı nömrə, Ulduz, Bəxtəvəri dances.

The main methods in the melodic development are wandering around reference sounds, variations, repetitions, and sequence shifts. Usually, sequence shifts occur as a result of modulations or shifts in other scales. Through the sequences, chord orientation from rast to shur starts. Although the sequence is a very common method in the development process, nevertheless, repetition and variation are the main factors in the melodic development of the overture. These principles, which are more typical for folk dance music, are clearly revealed in the structure of the main theme. Repetitions (Note: aa, bb, cc repetitions are meant.) are used here as a method of melodic development and patterning. Each of the sections of the main theme concludes with persistent repetitions of certain chord structures, such as folk songs or the traditional cadences of a mugham melody. Repetition manifests itself in a broader aspect in the structure of the auxiliary theme. The basis of this instruction is the transposition method.

One of the important components of the thematic material of the overture is the metrorhythmic structure, which includes all the richness and variety of the rhythmic content typical of different genres of folk music. Due to the character of the rhythmic movement, the connection of the main theme of the overture with folk-dance music is determined.

Periodic repetition and variation of metro rhythmic figures characteristic of folk dance music form the basis of the musical development of the work as a whole, which is particularly vividly manifested in the metrical structure of the main theme. The 2/4, 3/4 time signatures associated with the fast, agile dance movement suit its genre character. The dynamics of the rhythm increases due to the interrelationship of time fragments divided by accentuations.

In the polyphonic writing style of Soltan Hajibeyov's overture, more stable principles from folk music are used. Polyphony plays an especially large role in the rich development process of the secondary theme in the exposition. As the theme transposes from "h" to "fis" in the exposition, the strings forming the leading line of the melody are joined by a solo trumpet, as well as a brief imitation of the cello and double bass. The canonical juxtaposition of these three lines—at a quarter-note distance—creates an active-concentration musical development.

== Reception and play ==
The overture, written in 1956 on the occasion of the first Congress of Azerbaijani composers, was performed in the same year by the Azerbaijan State Symphony Orchestra under the leadership of conductor Niyazi Taghizade-Hajibeyov. After this performance, the work gained great fame.

Later, the piece was performed in Moscow under the conductorship of Abraham Stasevich. The work was included in the performance program of Moscow and performed by the Grand Symphony Orchestra of All-Union Television and Radio under the direction of conductor N. Anasov.

The piece was performed in 1962 by the Evanston Orchestra of Chicago, US. For this reason, the American composer Sidney Harth sent a letter to the composer Soltan Hajibeyov, in which he repeatedly mentioned the artistic qualities of the overture and that it was processed with high professionalism.

== See also ==
- Soltan Hajibeyov
- Music of Azerbaijan

== Bibliography ==
- Tağızadə, Aidə (2011). Soltan Hacıbəyov [Soltan Hajibayov] (in Azerbaijani). Baku: Mütərcim.
- Səfərova, Zemfira (2018). Azərbaycan musiqi tarixi [Music history of Azerbaijan] (in Azerbaijani). Vol. 3. Baku: Elm.
- Карагичева, Л. В; Исмайлов, М.С. (1961). Народная музыка Азербайджана [Folk music of Azerbaijan] (in Russian). Moscow: В Азербайджанская музыка.
- Холопова, Валентина (1964). Внимание ритму. № 7 (in Russian). Советская музыка.
