= Malibeyli Hamid =

Malibeyli Hamid Malıbəyli Həmid
- Born: 1869; Malibeyli, Shusha uezd, Elizavetpol Governorate, Russian Empire
- Died: March 22, 1922 (aged 52–53); Aghdam, Azerbaijan SSR
- Genres: Mugham, folk music
- Occupation(s): Singer-khananda, tarzen
- Instrument: tar
- Years active: 1882–1922

Hamid Imamgulu oghlu Gurbanov (Azerbaijani: Həmid İmamqulu oğlu Qurbanov, 1869 – March 22, 1922) was a 19th–20th century Azerbaijani singer-khananda and tarzen, representative of the Karabakh mugham school.

== Biography ==
Hamid Gurbanov was born in Malibeyli village near Shusha in 1869. He worked as a coachman for a while, and later he joined the "Assembly of khanandas" organized by Haji Husu, where he learned classical Eastern and Azerbaijani mughams from Haji Husu and Mashadi Isi. In addition to singing, Hamid also learned to play the tar. His first tar teacher was Sadigjan.

His first performance in Shusha took place at the gathering of a person named Najafgulu Agha together with Haji Husu, Mashadi Isi, Sadigjan and Avanes. After his performance at this gathering, Hamid is often invited to public celebrations. He performed for a long time at wedding parties and public gatherings together with musicians Javadbey Khanazayski, Mashadi Zeynal, Arsen Yaramyshev, and later Mashadi Jamil Amirov and Gurban Pirimov.

Malibeyli Hamid also worked as an actor. His name can be found on posters of opera performances such as "Leyli and Majnun" by Uzeyir Hajibeyov, "Seyfal mulk" by Mashadi Jamil Amirov.

Malibeyli Hamid often played and sang at the same time in gatherings. Although he played all the mughams on the tar, he was actually a gathering khananda. His "Rast" and "Segah" mughams were listened throughout Transcaucasia. He sang "Segah" in several versions, performed "Yetim Segah" and "Orta Segah" in his own form. Due to the innovation he brought to the "Segah" mugham, that mugham was called "Hamid Segah" among khanandas.

Hamid moved to the current city of Ganja with his family at the beginning of the 20th century. Here he met Mashadi Jamil Amirov and they cooperated for a long time. Mashadi Jamil accompanied Hamid by playing the tar, and Malibayli Hamid also accompanied Mashadi Jamil on the tar. Together, they went to the weddings and gatherings held in the present cities of Ganja, Shamkir, Qazax and Tbilisi and their surrounding regions, and performed there. Malibayli Hamid was repeatedly invited to Iran's cities of Rasht and Anzali. He performed together with his brother Asgar Gurbanov and kamancha player Boyukkishi Aliyev.

In 1910, Malibayli Hamid, who received an invitation from the "Gramophone" company, went to Riga, where he recorded his voice on a gramophone record. He sang the songs "Shur", "Rast", "Yetim Segah", "Humayun" and classifications, folk musics, and played the tar himself. His brother Asgar Gurbanov also sang several mughams with him.

Later, Malibeyli Hamid's voice sank and he began to deal more with the art of playing the tar. He accompanied Kechachioghlu Muhammed, Gasim Abdullayev, Musa Shushinski, Islam Abdullayev, Mashadi Mammad Farzaliyev, Mammadgulu Shushinski, Bulbul on the tar in concerts held in Karabakh and Ganja, Tbilisi.

Malibeyli Hamid died on March 22, 1922, in Aghdam.

== See also ==
Malibeyli Jumshud
