= Seyfal mulk =

"Seyfal mulk" (Azerbaijani: Seyfəl mülk) – is an Azerbaijani opera composed in 1915, by composer Mashadi Jamil Amirov.

Mirza Gadir Ismayilzade, known as "Vusagi" (Mikayil Mushfig's father) was the author of a libretto.

The opera was staged in 1915, in Ganja for the first time and a year later was staged at Tbilisi Opera and Ballet Theatre (now Paliashvili Theater of Opera and Ballet of Georgia). Sidgi Ruhulla was a staging director of the opera. Singers such as Majid Behbudov (Rashid Behbudov’s father), Bulbul, Malibeyli Hamid and others performed the parts in the opera. According to contemporary writers, composer Mashadi Jamil Amirov was the conductor of the opera. The opera was staged in Tbilisi and other cities of the South Caucasus. Data about these tours are in the 304th issue of "Kommunist" newspaper of 1957 and 61st issues of "Bakinskiy Rabochiy" newspaper of March 16, 1988.

== See also ==
- Prince Saiful Muluk and Princess Badi al-Jamal
