= Armenak Shushinski =

Armenak Shushinski (born Armenak Grigoryevich Asriyev, Shusha, February 1885 – Baku, 1967) was an ethnic Armenian kamancheh player.

== Biography ==
He was born in February 1885 to a family of tailors in Shusha (then part of Shusha uezd). He had 3 sisters and 6 brothers. He was sent to study at Armenian Eparchial Seminary of Karabakh at the age of 8. However, after three years, the family's difficult financial situation forced him leave the seminary and continue family business. He bought his first kamancheh at the age of 12 from his neighbour after selling a cauldron secretly from the house for 6 abbasi. Soon he learned how to play Uzundara and Karabakh Shikastasi.

Growing up, he was acquainted by Mashadi Isi, Hashim Keshtazli, Jabbar Garyaghdioglu, Sadiqjan, Lazar Ter-Vartanesov, Bakhshi Ballujali, Avanes, Baghdagul oghlu Gosti and other mugham musicians. He frequently attended the performances of khananda Kechachioghlu Muhammed, tar player Grigor Shushulu ("the Little"), kamancheh player Mirza Sattar in Khandemirov theatre, later becoming the student of Mirza. After practicing with him for a while, Armenak made his debut performance at age of 14 in a wedding taking place in the village of Mkhitarashen with khananda Hashim Keshtazli and tar player Uzun Mardi.

He was later acquainted and befriended Mammadgulu Shushinski, Grigor Shushulu, Charikhchi Bahadir and played Chahargah on solo in a big event in Armenian neighborhood of Shusha. He continued playing in different events, ceremonies and weddings following a group of musicians, especially Grigor for ten years.

He moved to Baku together with Mammadgulu Shushinski in 1908, where he met Jabbar Garyaghdioglu, Shakili Alasgar, Mashadi Zeynal, Gurban Pirimov, Tatevos Harutyunov, Shirin Akhundov and Sasha Oganezishvili and other artists in person.

Following the Soviet takeover of Azerbaijan, he performed as a part of "Brigade of Propaganda" (Russian: Агитбригада) in Barda, Yevlakh and Aghjabadi in February 1921. He became part of Azerbaijan State Oriental Orchestra of Folk Instruments led by Avanes Ioannesyan in 1922, giving a concert in Moscow with the orchestra in 1926. Orchestra at his time also included Bulbul, Seyid Shushinski, Khan Shushinski, Zulfu Adigozalov and others. He toured Central Asia together with Bulbul and Lazar Gabrielyan in 1931. His first recording performance happened in 1938, accompanying Surayya Qajar on kamancheh. Armenak, who participated in the All-Union review of folk instrument players in Moscow, was awarded with a certificate of commendation in 1939.

He accompanied Gambar Zulalov and Khan Shushinski during World War II as performed in military hospitals of Baku, Zheleznovodsk, Kislovodsk and Pyatigorsk. He also performed for soldiers in field together with Mammadkhan Bakikhanov, Khanlar Hagverdiyev, and Teymur Damirov during Baltic offensive in 1944, for which he was decorated with award and medals.

Armenak Shushinski died in 1967, in Baku.

== Sources ==
- Shushinski, Firudin (1985). "Armenak Əsriyev". Azərbaycan xalq musiqiçiləri [Azerbaijani folk musicians] (in Azerbaijani). Bakı: Yazichi. p. 239-243.
