= Mashadi Mammad Farzaliyev =

Azerbaijani folk singer (1872–1962)

Mashadi Mammad Farzaliyev Azerbaijani: Məşədi Məmməd Fərzəliyev
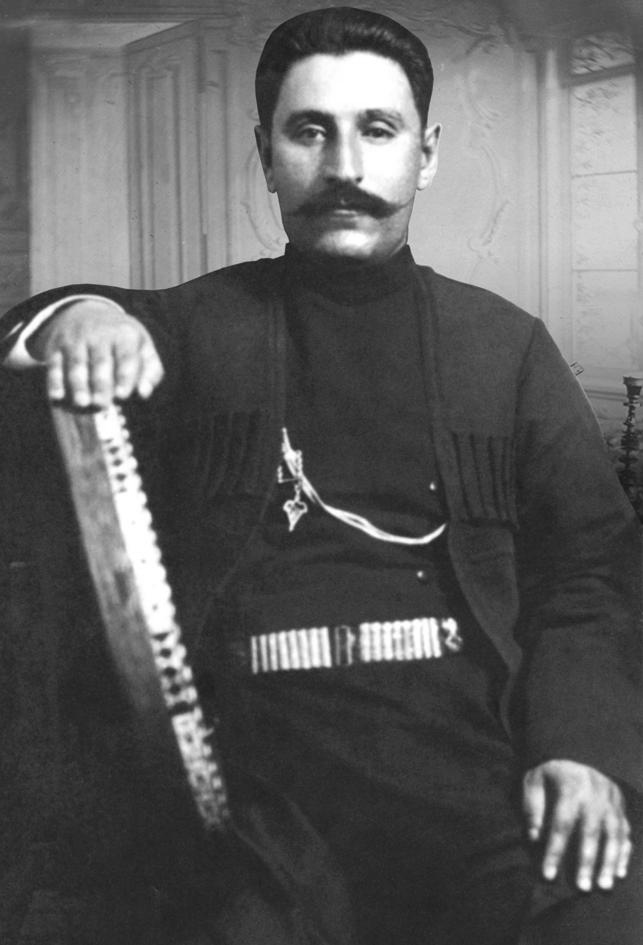
- Farzaliyev in 1911

Background information
- Also known as: Lohbala Mammad
- Born: 1872; Shusha, Elisabethpol Governorate, Russian Empire
- Origin: Azerbaijani
- Died: 1962 (aged 89–90) Istanbul, Turkey
- Genres: Mugham
- Occupation: Khananda
- Instrument: Dayereh

Mashadi Mammad Farzaliyev (Azerbaijani: Məşədi Məmməd Fərzəliyev, 1872 — 1962) was an Azerbaijani khananda traditional mugham folk singer.

== Biography ==
Mashadi Mammad Farzaliyev was born in 1872 in Shusha, Azerbaijan. He left Shusha as a child, and lived and worked in Ganja for a while, before moving to Tbilisi, Batumi, Vladikavkaz, Istanbul and other cities. Khananda was known throughout the Transcaucasia, Central Asia, Turkey and even in many European countries.

Mashadi Mammad performed with Tatevos Arutunyan and Mashadi Zeynal at weddings and folk festivals while he was in Shusha. His first success was at the Eastern Concert in the Shusha Khandamirov Theatre.

It was through such mughams as "Bayati-Kurd", "Rast", "Shur", "Chahargah", "Zabul-Segah", "Kurdi-Shahnaz", "Heyrati", "Mansuriyya", "Samai-Shams", "Karabakh Shikastasi", "Arazbari", "Keremi", and "Afshari" that Mashadi Mammad gained popularity and became known as the master of "Shushtar".

Mashadi Mammad Farzaliyev received an invitation in 1912 from Sport-Record, a company operating in Warsaw. He recorded about 40 mughams, tasnifs and songs, accompanied by Gurban Pirimov and kamancheh player Sasha Oganezashvili in Warsaw.

An invitation came from Kyiv. The artist recorded mugham and folk songs for the gramophone shaft for the company Ekstrafon. Mashadi Mammad was later invited to Tbilisi in the spring of 1913.

In 1923, Mashadi Jamil Amirov invited Mashadi Mammad to Ganja to teach mugham at the city's music school.

In 1926, Mashadi Mammad Farzaliyev performed in many cities in Russia, Poland, Germany, France, Belgium, England, Austria, Romania, Turkey and Iran.

In 1929, Farzaliyev left for a tour abroad and never returned to Azerbaijan. He lived in Istanbul, Turkey until his death in 1962.

== Bibliography ==
- Шушински, Ф. (1985). Азәрбайҹан халг мусигичиләри. Baku: Јазычы. p. 478. Archived from the original on 2020-02-20.
