= Gadzhibekov =

Gadzhibekov, sometimes transliterated as Hajibeyov, is a surname. There was a noted Azerbaijani family that worked in theatre and music with this family name.

Notable people with the surname include:

- Albert Gadzhibekov (born 1988), Russian footballer
- Ali Gadzhibekov (born 1989), Russian footballer

== People with the surname Hajibeyov ==
- Osman Hajibeyov (1924–1979), Azerbaijani theatrical actor of Soviet Azerbaijan.
- Soltan Hajibeyov (1919–1974), Azerbaijani composer
- Uzeyir Hajibeyov (1885–1948), Azerbaijani playwright, composer, conductor, publicist, and social figure
- Zulfugar Hajibeyov (1884–1950), Azerbaijani composer, and musical comedy theatre
