= Majid Behbudov =

Azerbaijani singer

Majid Behbudov Məcid Behbudov
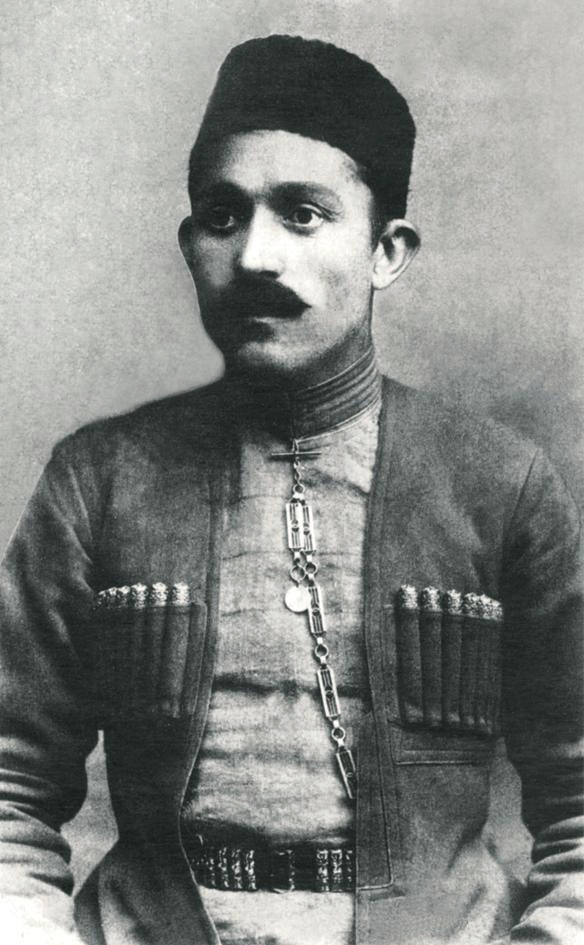

Background information
- Born: Behbudov Məcid Behbudalı oğlu April 18, 1873; Shusha, Elisabethpol Governorate, Russian Empire
- Origin: Azerbaijani
- Died: September 6, 1945 (aged 72) Qazax, Azerbaijan SSR, USSR
- Genres: mugham
- Occupation: khananda
- Years active: 1904-1945

Majid Behbudali oghlu Behbudov (Azerbaijani: Behbudov Məcid Behbudalı oğlu, 18 April 1873 — 6 September 1945) was an Azerbaijani khananda.

== Biography ==
Majid Behbudov was born on April 18, 1873, in Shusha. According to Jalil bey Bagdadbeyov, he started singing in 1904. He had previously sung with tar player Tatevos and kamancha player Makich in the Karabakh and Ganja assemblies, and later in the villages and towns of the Caucasus. Majid Behbudov sang for many years with tar players Mashadi Zeynal, Rzabala and kamancha player Ruben Garakhanov at the Dvoryansky Club in Tbilisi. In 1910, the "Gramophone" Company invited the khananda to Riga to record his voice. He was considered a skilful performer of Mirza Husein sigah, Shushtar and Chahargah mughams and many folk songs. M.Behbudov also performed in musical performances, had concerts in Tabriz, Istanbul and Sofia.

Majid Behbudov also contributed to the development of opera theater in Azerbaijan. He played the role of Khosrov in Sasha Oganezashvili's opera "Farhad and Shirin" in 1911. Majid Behbudov also performed in Uzeyir Hajibeyov's operas and operettas, and in Mashadi Jamil Amirov's opera "Seyfal-Mulk".

The khananda died on September 6, 1945, in Qazax.

== Family ==
- Husband of Firuza Vakilova.
- Father of Rashid Behbudov, Anvar Behbudov and Najiba Behbudova.
