= Armenak =

Armenak (in Armenian Արմենակ), alternatively pronounced Armenag in Western Armenian may refer to:

Armenak

- Armenak Alachachian (1930–2017), Egyptian-born Soviet Armenian basketball player and coach, who later immigrated to Canada
- Armenak Arzrouni (1901–1963), Egyptian Armenian photographer
- Armenak Ghazarian (1864–1904), better known as Hrayr Dzhoghk, Armenian military leader
- Armenak Petrosyan (born 1973), Armenian footballer
- Armenak Shushinski (1885–1967), Armenian folk musician
- Armenak Urfanyan (1990–2016), Armenian army officer
- Armenak "Aram" Yaltyryan (1914–1999), Soviet wrestler
- Armenak Yekarian (1870–1926), Armenian military leader

Armenag

- Armenag K. Bedevian, botanist
- Armenag Haigazian (1870–1921), Ottoman Armenian educator
- Armenag Shah-Mouradian (1878–1939), Armenian opera tenor

== See also ==
- Armenak Khanperyants Military Aviation University, air force academy in Armenia
