= Monument to Rashid Behbudov =

Monument in Baku, Azerbaijan

- Azerbaijani: Rəşid Behbudovun heykəli
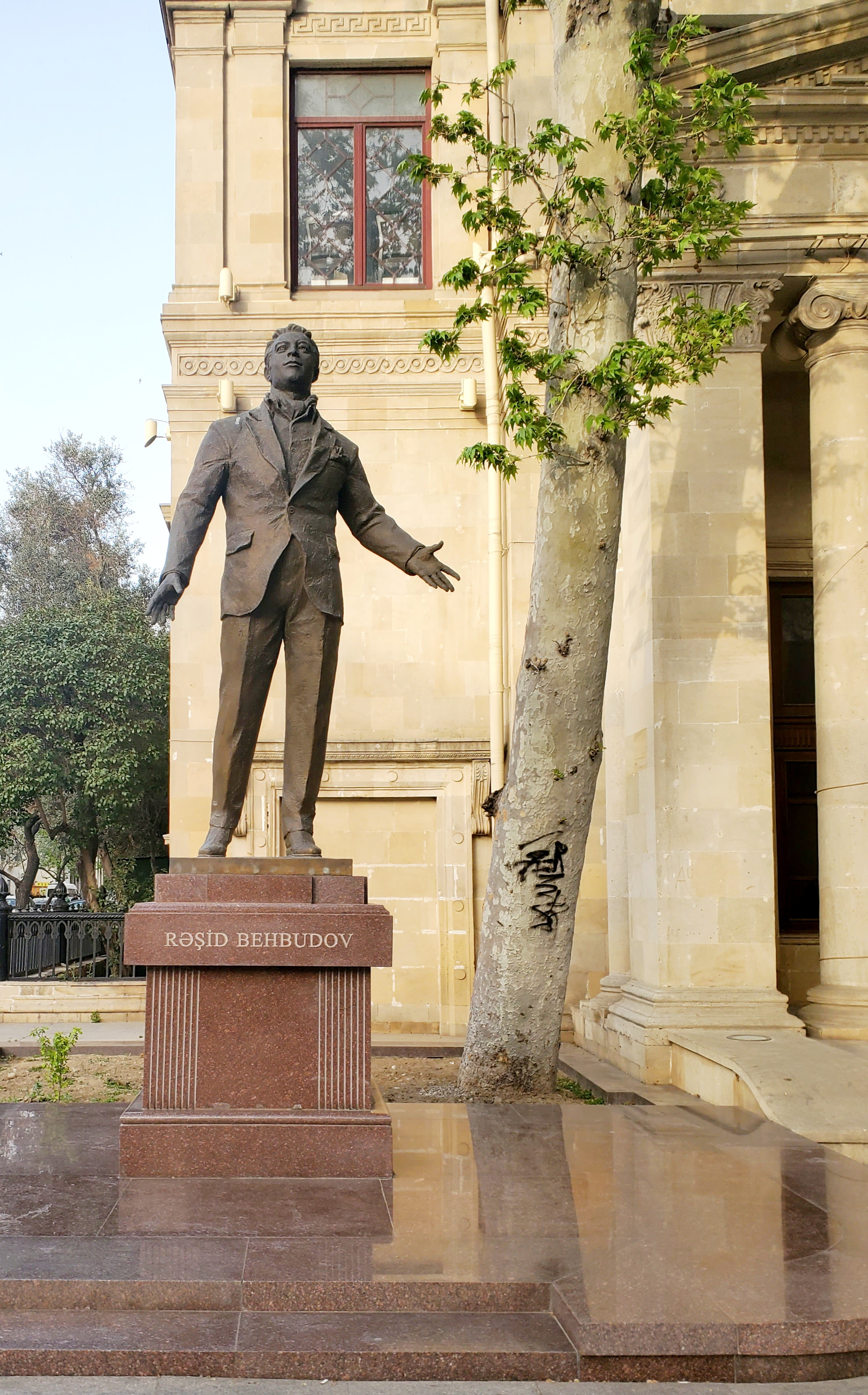
- Interactive map of Monument to Rashid Behbudov
- Location: Baku, Azerbaijan
- Coordinates: 40°22′29″N 49°50′48″E
- Designer: Fuad Salayev
- Material: Bronze
- Opening date: 2016
- Dedicated to: Rashid Behbudov

The Monument to Rashid Behbudov (Azerbaijani: Rəşid Behbudovun heykəli) is a monument to the Azerbaijani singer Rashid Behbudov. It is located in Baku, the capital of Azerbaijan, on Rashid Behbudov Street, in the front of the State Theatre of Song named in Rashid Behbudov's honour. The Azerbaijan National Library is located on the opposite side of Rashid Behbudov Street.

The sculpture is Fuad Salayev, the People's Artist of Azerbaijan. The monument was raised on 11 June 2016. The unveiling took place on 4 October of the same year. The opening ceremony was attended by the President of the Republic of Azerbaijan, Ilham Aliyev.
