= Azerbaijan State Song Theatre =

Theatre in Azerbaijan

Azerbaijan State Song Theatre named after Rashid Behbudov
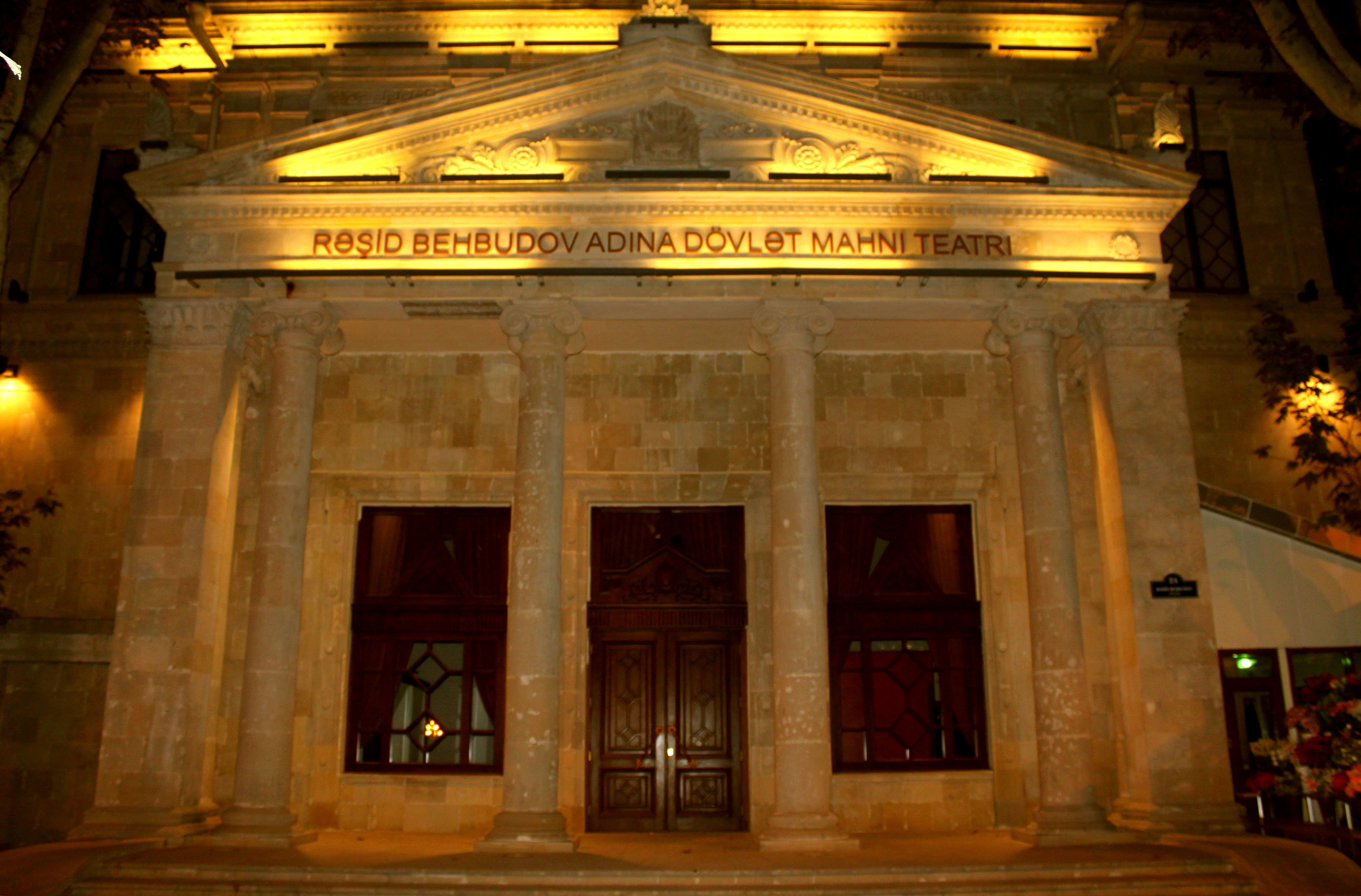
- Interactive map of Azerbaijan State Song Theatre named after Rashid Behbudov
- Address: Baku; Azerbaijan
- Coordinates: 40°22′29″N 49°50′49″E
- Owner: Ministry of Culture and Tourism of Azerbaijan
- Type: State theatre

Construction
- Opened: 1968
- Years active: 1968—present

The Azerbaijan State Song Theatre named after Rashid Behbudov (Azerbaijani: Rəşid Behbudov adına Dövlət Mahnı Teatrı) is located in Azerbaijan's capital, Baku, on Rashid Behbudov Street, and is named after Rashid Behbudov, who founded it in 1968.

The theatre building was originally built as a synagogue in 1901. It is in the Greek Revival style, with an Ionic order portico, and in the ornamented pediment there is a central lyre where a representation of the Tablets of Stone once featured.

The theatre's repertoire consists of folk songs, mugams and tasnifs, and works of national composers including Uzeyir Hajibeyov, Gara Garayev, Fikrat Amirov and Tofig Guliyev. Ilhama Guliyeva worked in the theatre.

== See also ==
- List of synagogues in Azerbaijan
- Azerbaijani culture
