= Anna von László =

- Occupation: Composer

Anna von László was a 19th century Hungarian composer who lived in Portugal.

== Compositions ==
- Fantasie, op. 1 for cello and piano
- Elegy in Hungarian style, op. 2 for piano
- Ess-Bouquet, op. 3 polka-mazurka for piano
- Ave Maria, op. 8 for French horn with obligato of two violins, alto and bass
- Ave Maria, op. 9 for soprano, solo and chorus
- L'amor mio e per te, e per la scienza, op. 13 cantilena for violin and piano
- Il Primo amore, op. 15 for piano
- Concertino, op. 40 for flute and piano (dedicated to King Luis)
