= Malibeyli Jumshud =

Malibeyli Jumshud Malıbəyli Cümşüd
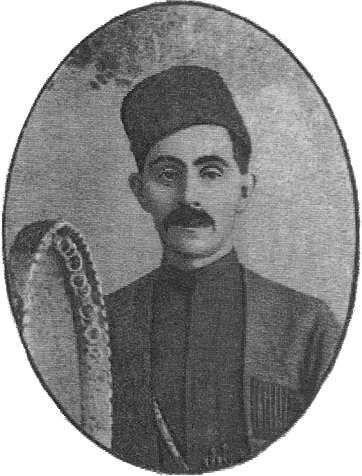

Background information
- Born: 1845; Malibeyli, Shusha uezd, Caspian Oblast, Russian Empire
- Died: 1915 (aged 69–70); Shusha, Shusha uezd, Elizavetpol Governorate, Russian Empire
- Genres: Mugham, folk music
- Occupation: Singer-khananda
- Instrument: Daf
- Years active: 1861–1915

Malibeyli Jumshud (Azerbaijani: Malıbəyli Cümşüd, 1845–1915) was a 19th–20th century Azerbaijani singer, representative of the Karabakh mugham school.

== Biography ==
Malibeyli Jumshud was born in 1845 in the village of Malibeyli near Shusha. Jumshud, who lost his father when he was 4–5 years old, worked as a Groom and a coachman for a while, and later, showing his interest for music, he performed in the "Khan Baghi" caravanserai with the tarzan Ballijali Bakhshi. At the age of 20–21, he was already invited to Karabakh assemblies as a singer.

"Segah", "Shahnaz", "Orta Mahur", "Shushtar", percussion mughams "Heyrati", "Ovshari", "Karabakh Shikastasi" and others are typical for Jumshud Malibeyli's performance. He also attended village weddings, and performed folk songs such as "Ay darya kenarinda", "Istikanin deshilsin", "Gelirem, gedirem, khabarin olsun", "Ay bala Fatma", "Qapida duran menem men", "Meni dovri felek qoymush", "Memeler" at the gatherings.

Malibeyli Jumshud mostly opted for ghazals and couplets and mostly cited the works of Molla Panah Vagif, Khurshidbanu Natavan, and Ashig Alasgar. He was invited several times to wedding parties in the Iranian cities of Tabriz, Rasht, Anzali and Qazvin with Javad Bey Alibey oglu, a tar player, and Karapet, a kamancha player.

The khananda also took part in performances and "Oriental concerts" in Shusha. The money collected from those performances and concerts was mainly used to meet the needs of students.

In 1913, having received an invitation from the "Extraphone" Joint Stock Company operating in Kiev, Jumshud recorded "Segah", "Mahur", "Rast" mughams and several other tasnifs on phonograph.

Malibeyli Jumshud died in Shusha in 1915, at the age of 70.
