= Afshan Gadimbeyova =

Azerbaijani scholar and politician

Afshan Alekber gizi Gadimbeyova
- Born: 1915; Erivan, Erivan Governorate, Russian Empire
- Died: 1980; Baku, Azerbaijan Soviet Socialist Republic, Soviet Union
- Scientific career
- Workplaces: Azerbaijan University of Languages; Azerbaijan Pedagogical Institute

Afshan Gadimbeyova (b. 1915; Erivan, Erivan Governorate, Russian Empire - d. 1980, Baku, Azerbaijan Soviet Socialist Republic, Soviet Union) was an Azerbaijani scholar and politician. She had worked as a deputy of chairman of the Supreme Soviet of the Azerbaijan Soviet Socialist Republic and rector of Azerbaijan University of Languages.

== Life ==
She was born in 1915 in the city of Erivan. Her father, Alakbar Bey Gadimbeyov, belonged to the Gadimbeyov family, which was carried by the descendants of Mirza Kadym Irevani.

Afshan Gadimbeyova graduated from the Yerevan Pedagogical Technical College in 1929 and continued her education at the Pedagogical Faculty of the Azerbaijan Pedagogical Institute (now Azerbaijan Pedagogical University) in 1931–1935. After finishing her studies there, she studied at the postgraduate level of the Pedagogical Institute located in Moscow.

After completing her education in Moscow, she worked as the third secretary of the Azerbaijan Youth Union from 1942 to 1946. She worked in the central committee of the Azerbaijan Medical University branch of the Communist Party of Azerbaijan. In 1949–1956, she was the rector of Azerbaijan University of Languages. She was also involved in politics and served as the deputy chairman of the Supreme Soviet of Azerbaijan. In 1965, she defended her candidate's thesis "On the development of preschool education in Azerbaijan in 1920-1941". From 1968 to 1978, she worked as a department head at the Azerbaijan Pedagogical Institute.

== See also ==
- Zemfira Safarova

== Sources ==
- Əhmədov, H (2014). Azərbaycan məktəb və pedaqoji fikir tarixi. Baku: Elm və təhsil.
