= Mammadgulu Shushinski =

Mammadgulu Shushinski Məmmədqulu Şuşinski
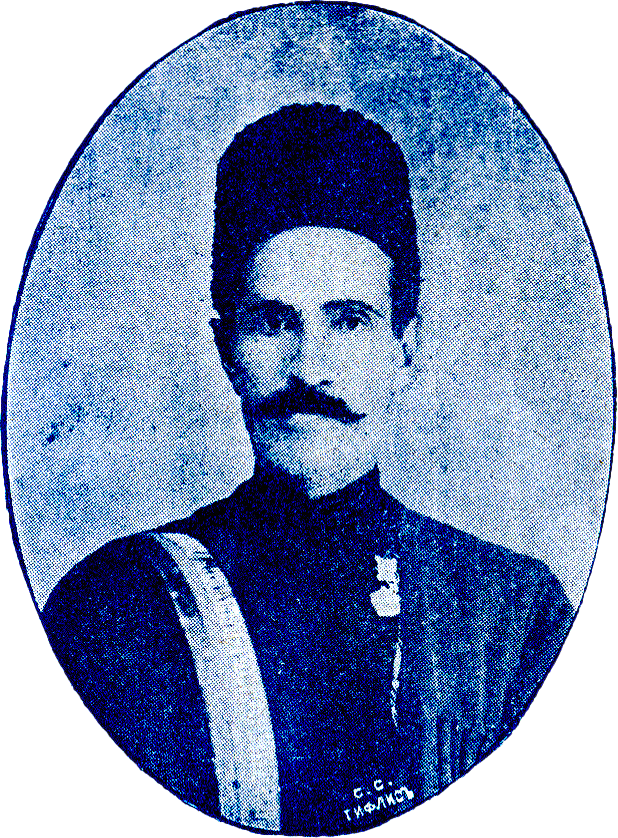

Background information
- Also known as: Dabbakh Mammadgulu
- Born: 1874; Shusha, Shusha uezd, Elizavetpol Governorate, Russian Empire
- Died: March 1929 (aged 54–55); Shusha, NKAO, Azerbaijan SSR, TSFSR, USSR
- Genres: Mugham, folk music
- Occupation: Singer-khananda
- Instrument: gaval
- Years active: 1893–1929
- Labels: Ekstrafon

Mammadgulu Shushinski or Dabbakh Mammadgulu (Azerbaijani: Məmmədqulu Şuşinski or Dabbax Məmmədqulu, 1874 – March 1929) was a 19th–20th century Azerbaijani singer-khananda, representative of the Karabakh mugham school.

== Biography ==
Mammadgulu was born in 1874 in the Gurdlar neighborhood in Shusha, in the family of a tanner. He was called by the nickname "Dabbakh (tanner) Mammadgulu" because he was engaged in tanning like his family. Mammadgulu, who received his first education in the cell of Kor Khalifa in Shusha, joined the troupe of the tarzen Shushulu Grikor. Mammadgulu, who was sent by his father to the school of Mir Mohsun Navvab, studied mugham for three years there, and at the age of 19, he began to sing in Karabakh music gatherings. When he was 20 years old, he participated in parties with the tarzen Grikor, the accordion player Isi Bey, and sang "Karabakh Shikastasi" in his own way.

In 1913, Mammadgulu, who was invited to Kyiv by the "Ekstrafon" joint stock company together with Shakili Alasgar, Kechachioghlu Muhammed, Islam Abdullayev, Seyid Shushinski, accompanied by tarzen Arsen Yaramishev and kamancha player Moses Quliyans, recorded the mughams "Bayati-Kurd", "Zabul-Segah", "Kurdu-Shahnaz", "Qatar", "Hasar", "Mukhalif", "Karabakh Shikastasi, "Heyrati" and "Akhsham oldu" classification on the gramophone shafts.

Khananda Mammadgulu Shushinski died in March 1929 in Shusha at the age of 55.
