= Mikayil Mushfig =

Azerbaijani writer (1908–1938)

- Mikayıl Müşfiq
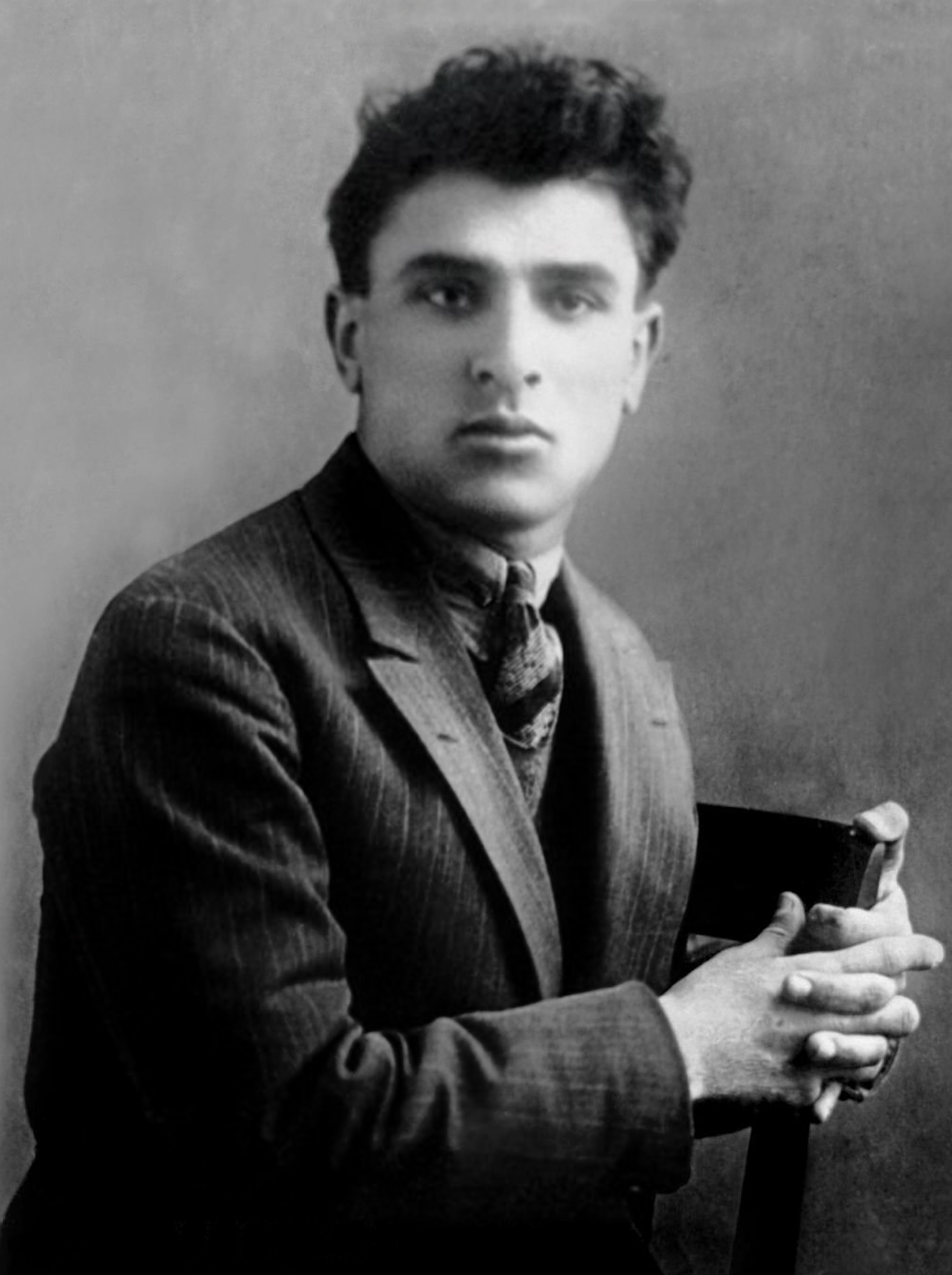
- Born: Mikayil Ismayilzade; June 5, 1908; Baku, Baku Governorate, Russian Empire
- Died: January 6, 1938 (aged 29); Baku, Azerbaijan SSR, USSR
- Citizenship: USSR
- Education: Baku State University
- Occupations: Lyrical poet, writer, translator, teacher
- Years active: 1926 - 1938
- Style: Lyrical
- Spouse: Dilber Akhundzade (1933;his death)
- Parents: Mirza Abdulgadir Vusagi (father); Zuleykha Ismayilzade (mother)

Mikayil Mushfig (Azerbaijani: Mikayıl Müşfiq, born Mikayil Ismayilzade) (5 June 1908, Baku – 6 January 1938, Baku) was an Azerbaijani poet of the 1930s. Mikayil Mushfig is considered one of the founders of the new Azerbaijani poetic style.

Most of his poetry is about romance, nature, feelings. Despite this, he soon became one of the slandered and criticized poets in the Union of Soviet Azerbaijani Writers, and soon afterwards, Mushfig was arrested and executed by Soviet authorities at the age of 30 during the Stalinist purges in the USSR. In 1956, he was exonerated posthumously. Nikita Khrushchev era of de-stalinization has resulted in Mushfig's poetry being famous in Azerbaijani society.

== Life and poetry ==
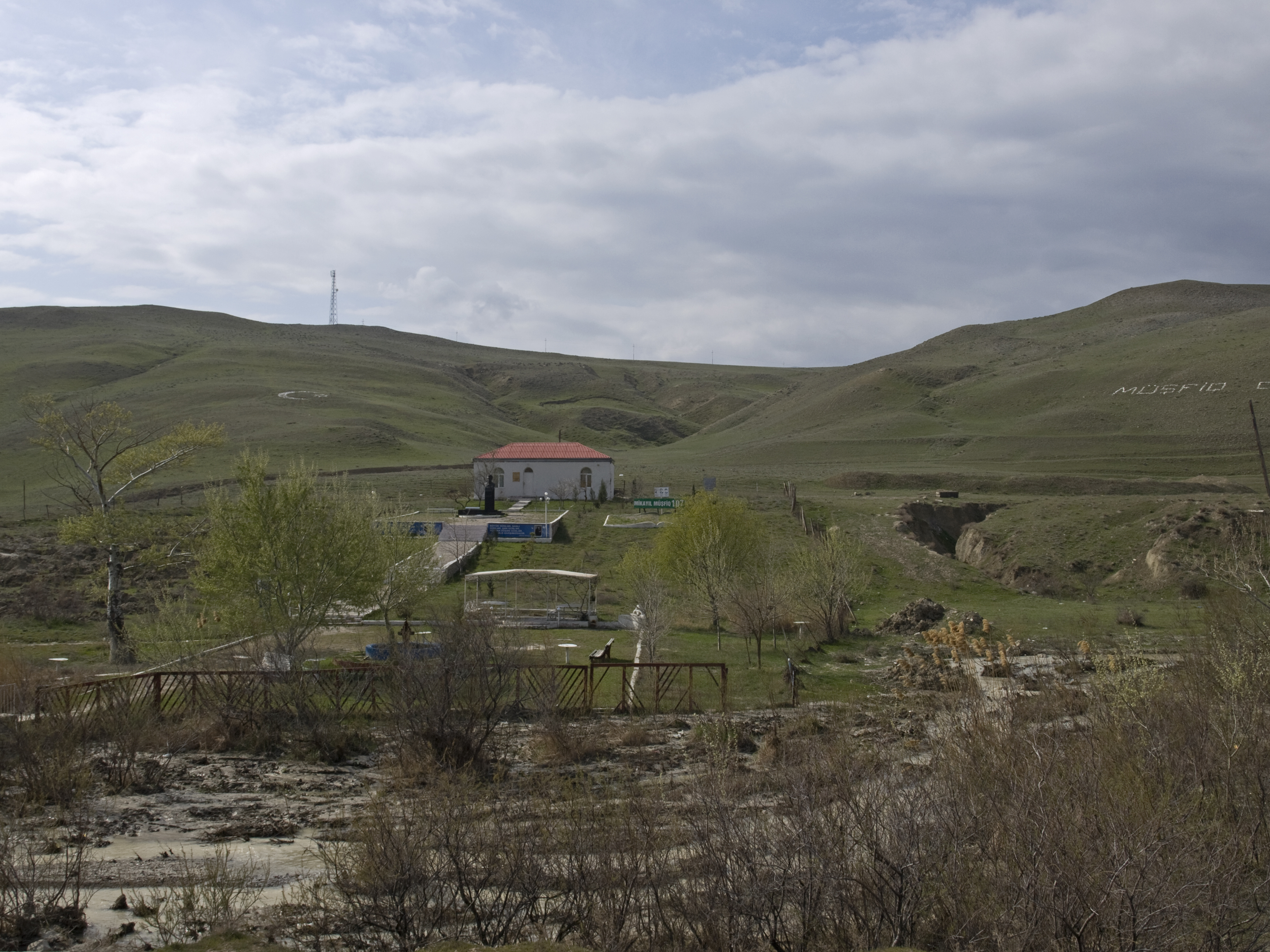
Mushfig museum close to Xızı.

Mikayil Mushfig was born in the city of Baku of Baku Governorate in 1908. His father Mirza Abdulgadir Ismayilzade was a teacher and a poet. He lost his parents in early childhood, so he was brought up by the relatives. He received his elementary education at Russian-language School in Baku. After the establishment of the Soviet regime in Azerbaijan in 1920, he studied at Baku Teacher's School and in 1931, he graduated from the Department of Language and Literature of the Baku State University. Mushfig married Dilber Akhundzade in 1933.

Mikayil started his professional career as a school teacher. While being involved in teaching, he started writing poems. His first poem Bir Gün ("The Day") was published in the Ganj fahla newspaper in Baku in 1926. At about this time, he adopted the pen name Mushfig (Perso-Arabic for "tender-hearted"). Along with Samad Vurgun and Rasul Rza, Mikayil Mushfig became one of the founders of the new Azerbaijani Soviet poetic style in the 1930s. He translated a number of poems from Armenian and Russian as well. Mikayil Mushfig actively promoted traditional Azerbaijani musical instruments, which had been forbidden at that time.

In his poetry, Mushfig glorified the work of industrial workers and peasants and lauded the construction of industrial enterprises in Baku and other cities. According to Mushfig's wife, Dilbar Akhundzadeh, Mikayil welcomed the transition from the Perso-Arabic script to the Latin script that took place in Azerbaijan in 1927. His excitement was expressed in the following verse:

And at parting,
My soul wants to tell you:
"Goodbye! Your last day has come,
Wretched old alphabet!"

When Stalin and Mir Jafar Baghirov decreed that traditional Azerbaijani musical instruments, including the tar, were to be banned, Mushfig wrote a poem in response titled "Sing Tar, Sing". The popularity of his poem with the public convinced the authorities to rescind the tar ban.

== Arrest and execution ==
In the late 1930s, as confessed by writer Mehdi Huseyn in one of the Ilyas Afandiyev's memories, it was very common among poets and writers to slander each other and accuse each other of nationalism or spreading religious propaganda. The reasons of such slanders were generally connected with personal problems and bitter rivalries between certain poets and writers. Mushfig himself came under the barrage of criticism in the Azerbaijani Writers' Union along with some other literary figures of the era such as Huseyn Javid, Ahmed Javad and Yusif Vazir Chamanzaminli. Literary figures who were serving the interests of Stalin's regime in the USSR branded Mushfig as a "chauvinist" and a "petit-bourgeois poet". He was arrested in 1937, charged with treason as "the enemy of the state", and executed in 1939 in the Bayil prison near Baku. He was later officially exonerated. Even though Mushfig wrote poems about Joseph Stalin, during the de-Stalinization policy of the USSR he was portrayed as an "anti-Stalinist" poet.

On May 23, 1956, under the decision of the Military Collegium of the Supreme Court of USSR, Mikayil Mushfig was acquitted after his death.

In October 2018, a working group consisting of the members of National Academy of Sciences, the ministries of Health and Culture, and other relevant authorities was set up under the instruction of the President Ilham Aliyev in order to investigate the most recent information about the unearthed remains of the poet.

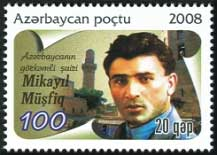
Stamp dedicated to the 100th anniversary of poet Mikayil Mushfig

== Published works ==
- Küləklər ("The Winds"), 1930
- Günün Səsləri ("The Voices of the Day"), 1932
- Collection of Poems, 1934
- Selected works (2 volumes), 1960
- Duyğu Yarpaqları ("The Leaves of a Feeling"), 1966
- Poems (2 volumes), 1968 and 1973
- Yenə O Bağ Olaydı ("I wish it was that garden again"), 1976
- Ədəbiyyat Nəğməsi ("The Song of literature"), 1978

== Honours ==
- In 1968, Mushfig's wife Dilber Akhundzade published the memorial book, “My days with Mushfiq”, telling the story of Mushfig and Dilber's life after they met in 1931, as well as Dilber's life after Mushfig's arrest and execution. The book has been published several times, the latest was in 2014.
- In 1970, a statue of Mushfig made by the sculptor Munevver Rzayeva and the architect Shafiga Rzayeva was unveiled at the intersection of Inshaatchilar avenue and N.Narimanov street in Yasamal district of Baku.
- In 1977, “Mikayil Mushfig” dry cargo vessel was released into water by Caspian Shipping Company.
- In 1988, a new settlement – Mushfigabad named after M.Mushfig was established under the instruction of Supreme Soviet of Azerbaijan.
- In 1988, “The place of Mikayil Mushfig” was established at the house of Mushfig's father in Sayadlar village of Khizi raion by the initiative of Tofig Novruzov, Jabir Novruz, Aydın Zeynalov and Nabi Khazri.
- In 1988, a secondary school named after the poet was founded in Sumgayit and the bust of Mushfig was placed in front of the school building.
- In 1989, the bust of the poet made by Munevver Rzayeva was laid in Sayadlar village of Khizi by the initiative of the philanthropist Abulhasan Ahmedov.
- In 1989, a memorial board was erected on the wall of the building where Mushfig lived in Baku (S.Rahimov street, 108).
- In 1993, a statue of Mikayil Mushfig was opened in Mushfigabad.
- In 2004, “The place of Mikayil Mushfig” was transformed into the memorial house museum of M.Mushfig according to the decision of the Ministry of Culture of Azerbaijan.
- In 2008, the 100th anniversary of the birth of Mikayil Mushfig was solemnly celebrated. In this regard, the Azerpocht Association of the Ministry of Communications of Azerbaijan issued a stamp dedicated to M.Mushfig.
- In 2008, the tar-shaped monument in 8 m length was installed at the foothills of the mountain across the memorial house museum of M.Mushfig in Khizi.
- In 2018, the President Ilham Aliyev issued a decree on marking the 110th anniversary of the birth of the prominent poet M.Mushfig.

School No.18 in Baku, No.14 in Ganja, No.34 in Sumgait, secondary school in Gilazi settlement in Khizi are named after Mikayil Mushfig.

== Songs to Mikayil Mushfig's poems ==
- Küləklər ("The Winds") performed by Eyyub Yagubov on YouTube
- Yenə O Bağ Olaydı ("I wish it was the garden again") performed by Eyyub Yagubov on YouTube
- Ana ("Mother") performed by Eyyub Yagubov on YouTube
- "Qal sənə Qurban" performed by Zeynab Khanlarova
- "Sənin üçün" performed by Zeynab Khanlarova
- "Qurban olduğum" performed by Shovkat Alakbarova
- "Neçin gəlmədin" performed by Shovkat Alakbarova
- "Oxu Tar" performed by Gulagha Mammadov
- "Oxu sevdiciyim" performed by Nazakat Mammadova
- "Söylə" performed by Alim Gasimov

== See also ==
- Azerbaijani Literature
- Great Purge
