= Shah Ismail (dastan) =

Azerbaijani form of oral history

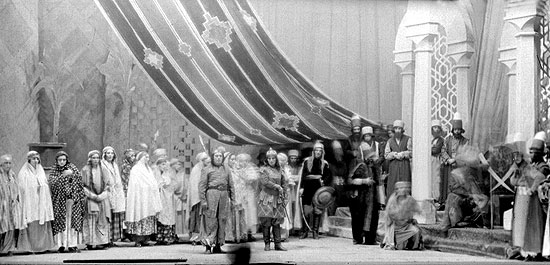
Scene from "Shah Ismayil" opera. Director - Abbas Mirza Sharifzadeh

"Shah Ismayil" (Azerbaijani: Şah İsmayıl) is an Azerbaijani love dastan. There are collected up to 10 versions. According to some researchers (Hamid Arasli, for example), the dastan is associated with the name of Shah Ismail I, according to others (for example, Mammadhuseyn Tahmasib) - with the name of Shah Ismail II.

The summary of the dastan is as follows: The Shah who found his son Ismayil with difficulty hides him in a special place. During the hunt, Shah Ismail meets a girl named Gulzar and falls in love with her. After long adventures, he takes Gulzar to his fathers demesne. The Shah, wanting to master Gulzar, blinds his son Ismail. However, Ismail recovers, takes revenge on his father, comes to power and reunites with his beloved Gulzar.

Dastan is rich in heroic motives. From this point of view, the image of the Arab Zengi attracts the attention. In her face are expressed the woman’s loyalty, friendship and love. The dastan reflects the idea of the fair ruler. Based on the dastan "Shah Ismayil", the Azerbaijani composer Muslim Magomayev wrote an opera of the same name.

== See also ==
- Ashiq Qarib
- Epic of Koroghlu
- Book of Dede Korkut
