= Shakili Alasgar =

Alasgar Abdullayev Ələsgər Abdullayev
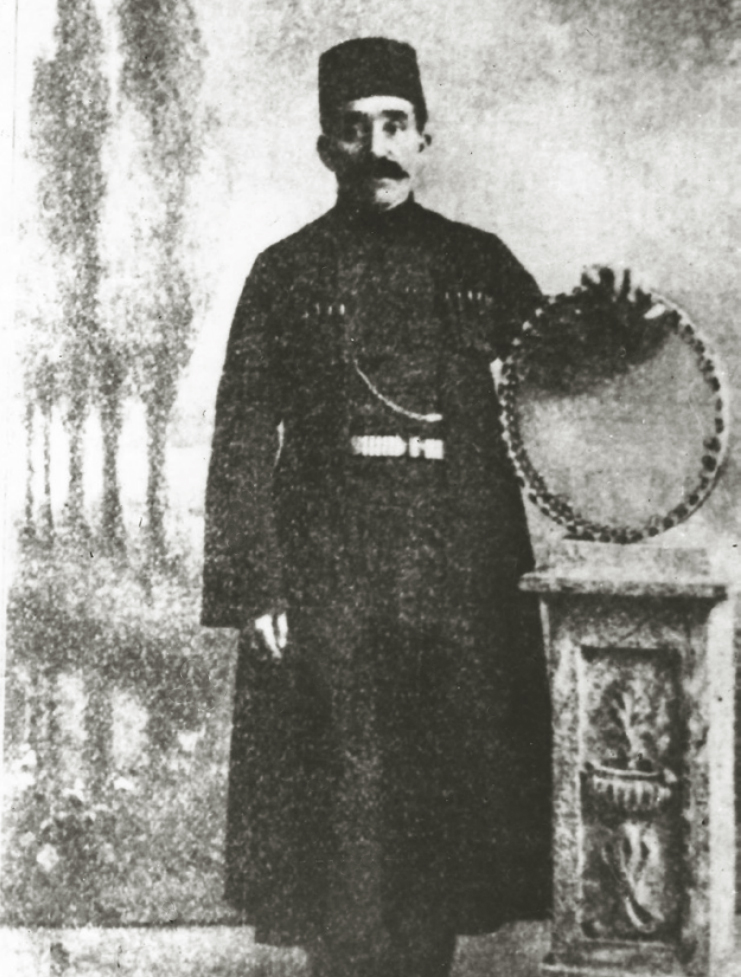

Background information
- Also known as: Shakili Alasgar
- Born: Abdullayev Ələsgər Baba oğlu 1866; Nukha, Nukhinsky Uyezd, Elisabethpol Governorate, Russian Empire
- Origin: Azerbaijani
- Died: April 1, 1929 (aged 62–63) Baku, Azerbaijan SSR, Transcaucasian SFSR, USSR
- Genres: mugham
- Occupation: khananda
- Instrument: dayereh

Alasgar Abdullayev or Shakili Alasgar (Azerbaijani: Ələsgər Abdullayev; 1866 — 1 April 1929) was an Azerbaijani khananda.

== Biography ==
Shakili Alasgar was born in Nukha (present-day Shaki) in 1866. He worked with a bricklayer in his childhood. Alasgar Abdullayev acquainted with Keshtazly Hashim when he was in Shaki. During his stay in Shaki, he taught him mugham lessons and played an important role in his life. A.Abdullayev's other teacher was Aghabala, a businessman.

A.Abdullayev took part in the 1st, 2nd and 3rd "Eastern Concerts" in Baku in 1902-1903, sang "Chahargah", "Shushtar" and "Bayaty-Shiraz" mughams. He also participated closely in theater performances and in the "Eastern Nights" organized by the "Nicat" society.

In 1912-1918 A.Abdullayev's concerts were held in various cities of Central Asia, Iran and Turkey. He was awarded a medal by shah for his performance in one of the Iranian assemblies.

Alasgar Abdullayev was invited by the "Sport-Record" and "Extrafon" joint-stock companies in 1913-1914 to Tbilisi and Kiev. He sang "Chahargah", "Rast", "Mahur-Hindi", "Zabul-Segah", "Rahab", "Shushtar", "Hasar" mughams, a number of Azerbaijani, Georgian and Armenian songs and was accompanied by Gurban Pirimov and Tevos in tar, and by Sasha Okanezashvili and Moses Guliyans in kamancha. He has been accompanied by Shirin Akhundov for many years. He was particularly popular with his "Rahab" singing.

A.Abdullayev performed with Jabbar Garyagdioglu in front of Baku workers as a part of the first Eastern Orchestra organized by Doctor Johannesan. In addition, he performed with Gurban Pirimov and kamancha player Armenak Shushinski at Baku's Summer Clubs, "Eastern Music Nights". Khananda was also involved in the radio broadcasts of Azerbaijan.

Shakili Alasgar died on 1 April 1929 in Baku.
