= Mirza Abdulgadir Vusagi =

Azerbaini poet and author

- Mirzə Əbdülqədir Vüsaqi
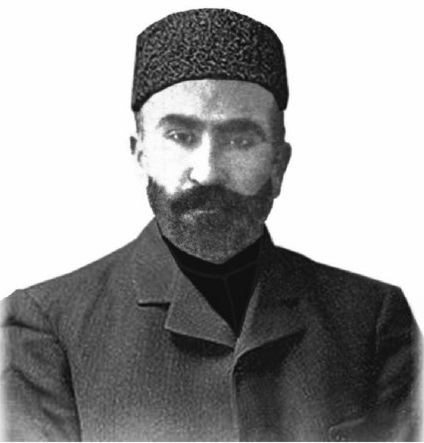
- Born: Abdulgadir Ismayilzada; June 5, 1865; Sayadly village, Khizi District
- Died: 1914; Baku
- Spouse: Zuleykha Ismayilzada
- Children: Mikayil Mushfig
- Writing career
- Pen name: Vusagi
- Language: Azerbaijani language
- Notable work: Seyfal mulk

Mirza Abdulgadir Vusagi or Abdulgadir Ismayilzada (1865, Sayadli village, Khizi district – 1914, Baku) was an Azerbaijani poet and writer. He is the author of the libretto for the operas "Shah Ismail" and "Seyfal mulk", the dramatic creations "Yusif and Zuleikha", "Ali Khan" and "Shahzade Ismail". He is the father of Mikayil Mushfig.

== Biography and creation ==
Abdulgadir Ismailzada was born in 1865 in Khizi, in the village of Sayadli. His father, Molla Ismayil, was a famous teacher in Khizi. Abdulgadir received his primary education from his father, and for a deeper study of the Arabic language, he studied from kazi of Guba Akhund Zaki. For some time, he taught at his father's school.In 1902, he moved to Baku, where he continued his teaching activity. For a while he taught to Jafar Jabbarli. In 1905, he entered a two-year pedagogical course on a new method of education, opened by the "Nashri-Maarif" association. After completing the courses, he began teaching according to the new methodology. In 1908, he received an invitation from the Saadat school in Baku, where he worked for the rest of his life. Mirza Abdulgadir's poems, which he wrote under the pseudonym of "Vusagi", were published in the newspapers and magazines of that time. Muslim Magomayev wrote his opera “Shah Ismayil” based on the poem “Shahzada Ismail” by Mirza Abdulgadir. Vusagi also wrote the libretto for the operas "Shah Ismayil" and "Seyfal mulk". Two librettos - "Yusif and Zuleikha" and "Ali Khan" - remained unfinished.

Mirza Abdulgadir Vusagi died in 1914 in Baku.

== Memory and legacy ==
After the arrest of the famous Azerbaijani poet Mikayil Mushfig on 4 June 1937, dozens of books and hundreds of manuscripts were confiscated from his house. Subsequently, the confiscated works were deemed "insignificant" and were burned on 13 October 1937. Most likely, among these destroyed books and manuscripts were the works of Mirza Abdulgadir Vusagi's.

In the city of Khizi, there is a street in the name of Mirza Abdulgadir Vusagi.

== Family ==
In 1904, Vusagi married Zuleikha Ismailzada. From this marriage were born Mirza Ismailzada, Boyukkhanym Ismailzada, Balajakhanym Ismailzada, Mikayil Ismailzada (Mikayil Mushfig).

== See also ==
- Jafar Jabbarly
- Mikayil Mushfig

== Literature ==
- Gurbansoy, Firudin (2018). Mirzə Əbdülqadir Visaqi: özü və sözü (PDF). Baku. ISBN 978-9952-37-100-0. Archived from the original (PDF) on 2021-10-06.
