= Osman Hajibeyov =

- Born: Osman Ismayil oglu Hajibeyov; 18 February 1924; Shusha, Azerbaijan Soviet Socialist Republic
- Died: 14 June 1979 (aged 72); Baku, Azerbaijan Soviet Socialist Republic

Osman Ismayil oglu Hajibeyov (18 February 1924 – 14 June 1979) was a theatrical actor of Azerbaijan. He was awarded the title Honored Artist of the Azerbaijan SSR (1969), and was a winner of the Lenin Komsomol Prize (1967).

== Life ==
Osman Ismayil oglu Hajibeyov was born on 18 February 1924 in Shusha, Azerbaijan Soviet Socialist Republic, USSR in an intellectual family. After graduating from the seventh grade of high school in Baku, he entered the Azerbaijan State Theater School. From the first time he studied at the theater school, he performed on the stage of the Azerbaijan State Theatre of Young Spectators. When he graduated in 1942, he was sent to Azerbaijan State Theater of Young Spectators as an actor.

On 25 December 1969 Osman Hajibeyov was awarded the honorary title of "Honored Artist of the Azerbaijan SSR" in connection with the 50th anniversary of the Azerbaijan State Theatre of Young Spectators and for his contribution to the development of national theatrical art. The actor died on 14 June 1979 in Baku, Azerbaijan Soviet Socialist Republic, USSR.

== Filmography ==
- "O olmasın, bu olsun”

== Family ==
His brother Soltan Hajibeyov was composer and People's Artist of the USSR. Osman Hajibeyov was Uzeyir Hajibeyov's cousin.

== See also ==
- Soltan Hajibeyov
