= Zemfira Safarova =

Azerbaijani and Soviet musicologist

Zemfira Yusif gizi Safarova
- Born: 10 June 1937 (age 88); Kislovodsk, USSR
- Awards: Honored Artist of the Azerbaijan SSR ( 1989); Honored Worker of Science of Azerbaijan laureate of the Humay Award
- Scientific career
- Institutions: Musicologist, Doctor of art history

Zemfira Safarova (born 10 June 1937) is an Azerbaijani and Soviet musicologist, doctor of art history, professor (1998), full member of the Azerbaijan National Academy of Sciences (2017), Honored Artist of the Azerbaijan SSR (1989), Honored Worker of Science of the Azerbaijan SSR, and laureate of the Humay Award.

== Biography ==
Zemfira Safarova was born on June 10, 1937, in Kislovodsk, USSR, in the family of oil engineer Yusif Safarov. In 1960 she graduated from the Faculty of Theory and Composition of the Baku Academy of Music. In 1966, she completed her postgraduate studies at the Institute of Architecture and Art of the Azerbaijan National Academy of Sciences (headed by I. Ya. Ryzhkin). In 1970 she defended her Ph.D. thesis on “Musical and aesthetic concept of Uzeyir Hajibeyov”.

From 1959 to 1962 she taught at the ten-year music school at the Baku Academy of Music. Since 1966 he has been a researcher (since 1975 a senior researcher), and since 1980 head of the department of Azerbaijani musical art at the Institute of Architecture and Art of the Academy of Sciences of the Azerbaijan SSR. She became a full member of Azerbaijan National Academy of Sciences in 2007. Since May 2, 2017, she is an academician of the Azerbaijan National Academy of Sciences.

== Awards ==
- Honored Artist of the Azerbaijan SSR (1989)
- Honored Worker of Science of the Azerbaijan SSR
- Laureate of the Humay Award

== See also ==
- Afshan Gadimbeyova
