= Müşfiqabad =

Village and municipality in Garadagh raion, Baku, Azerbaijan

Coordinates: 49°13′13″N 40°29′33″E

Mushfigabad (Azerbaijani: Müşfiqabad) is a village and municipality in the Garadagh raion of Baku, Azerbaijan. It has a population of 8,011.
