= Suraya Qajar =

Soviet and Azerbaijani singer

Suraya Sadraddin qizi Qajar
- Born: Sürəyya Qacar; May 1, 1910; Shusha, Russian Empire
- Died: July 27, 1992 (aged 82); Baku, Azerbaijan
- Occupation: Mezzo-soprano

Suraya Sadraddin gizi Qajar (Azerbaijani: Sürəyya Sədrəddin qızı Qacar; May 1, 1910 – July 27, 1992) was a Soviet and Azerbaijani singer (mezzo-soprano). She was awarded the honorary titles of People's Artiste of the Azerbaijan SSR (in 1954) and People's Artist of the Armenian SSR.

== Life ==
Qajar was born on May 1, 1910, in Shusha, Russian Empire. In 1927 she graduated from the Baku Pedagogical College. From 1927 to 1939 she was a soloist of the Azerbaijan State Academic Opera and Ballet Theater. Since 1940 she has been a soloist of the Azerbaijan State Academic Philharmonic Hall, and since 1968 she has been a vocal teacher-consultant. From 1946 to 1957 she was a soloist of the Armenian State Academic Philharmonic Hall.

The main focus in the work of Qajar was occupied by Azerbaijani folk songs, mugams, as well as songs of the people of the USSR and Soviet composers. She has toured both the cities of the Soviet Union and of Iran. She was awarded two Orders of the Badge of Honor and medals. She died in 1992 in Baku.

== Roles ==
- Leyli – Leyli and Majnun (Uzeyir Hajibeyov)
- Asli – Asli and Kerem (Uzeyir Hajibeyov)
- Gulnaz – If Not That One, Then This One (Uzeyir Hajibeyov)
- Shahsenem – Ashig Garib (Zulfugar Hajibeyov)

== Family ==
His father, Sadraddin Mirza Gajar, was an officer belonging to the Bahmani family. The family was founded by Bahman Mirza Qajar, a former governor of Iranian Azerbaijan and a member of the Qajar dynasty. Sadraddin Mirza Qajar was executed by Bolsheviks after the Red Army invasion of Azerbaijan.
