= Rashid Behbudov Street =

Street in Baku, Azerbaijan

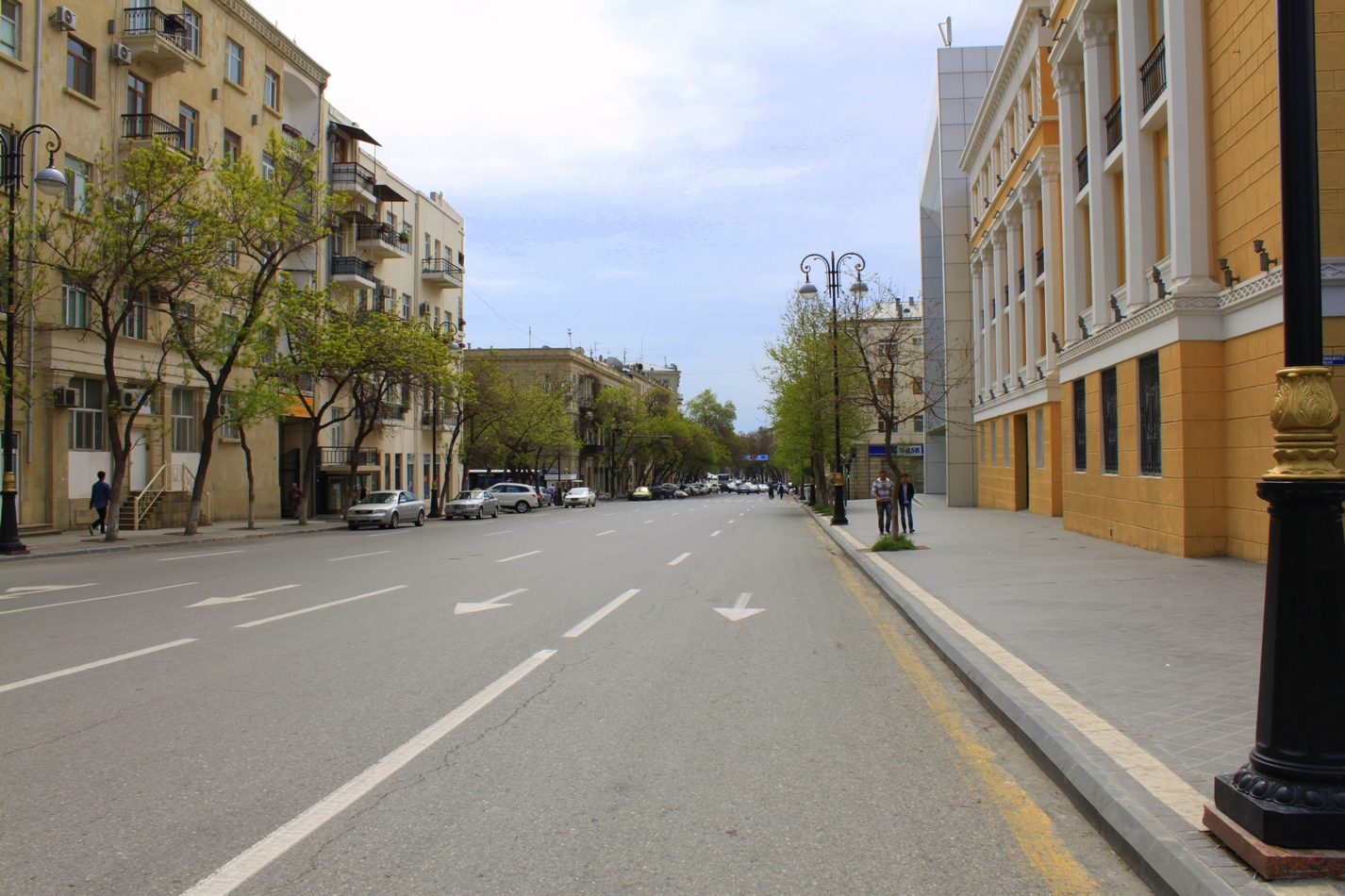
- Maintained by: City of Baku
- Length: 2.16 km (1.34 mi)
- Location: Sabail raion
- south end: Neftchiler Avenue
- Major junctions: Baku Boulevard
- north end: Bakikhanov street

Rashid Behbudov Street (Azerbaijani: Rəşid Behbudov küçəsi) is an arterial road in central Baku, Azerbaijan, named after famed Azerbaijani singer Rashid Behbudov. It begins at the south end of the Sabayil district of Baku and continues north, terminating at the intersection with Bakikhanov Street intersecting Uzeyir Hajibeyov Street.

== Overview of the street ==
The former names of the street include "Budagovskaya", "Kaspiyskaya", "Lieutenant Schmidt". It was renamed after a renowned Azerbaijani singer and actor Rashid Behbudov. It stretches 2.16 km (1.34 mi). Connecting Neftchiler Avenue in downtown Baku via a stretch of Bakikhanov Street to Tbilisi Avenue, which leads to the northern entrance of Baku. Rashid Behbudov Street is heavy with traffic throughout the day. Both OVIR (Department of Visas and Registration) issuing passports and Azerbaijan University of Languages are located on Rashid Behbudov Street, which causes more traffic during the academic year due to the increased number of commuting students and incoming citizens from other parts of the country registering their passports.

The southern part of the street has many buildings from the 19th century with many boutiques, shops, and upscale restaurants, whereas the northern part is seen with newly built high-rise buildings.

== Notable buildings and monuments located on the avenue include ==
- Music School No.2 named after Rashid Behbudov
- Rashid Behbudov Song Theater
- School No. 8
- Central Bank of Azerbaijan
- Shahriyar House of Culture
- Azerbaijani Musical Arts Museum
- Jazz Center of Baku
- Aquapark
- Azerbaijan University of Languages
- Department of Visas and Registration (also called OVIR)
- Former 26 Commissars Memorial

== Picture gallery ==
Lieutenant Schmidt-Kaspiyskaya

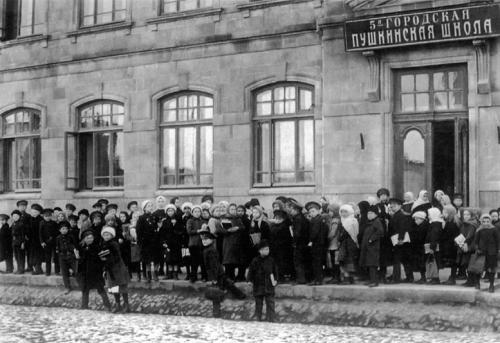
Kids in front of Pushkin school No. 5 (now School No. 8)

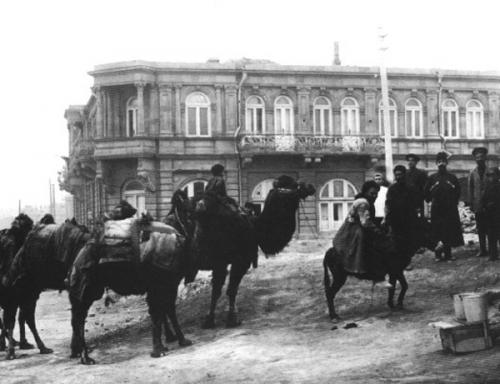
House of Murtuza Mukhtarov
Rashid Behbudov Street

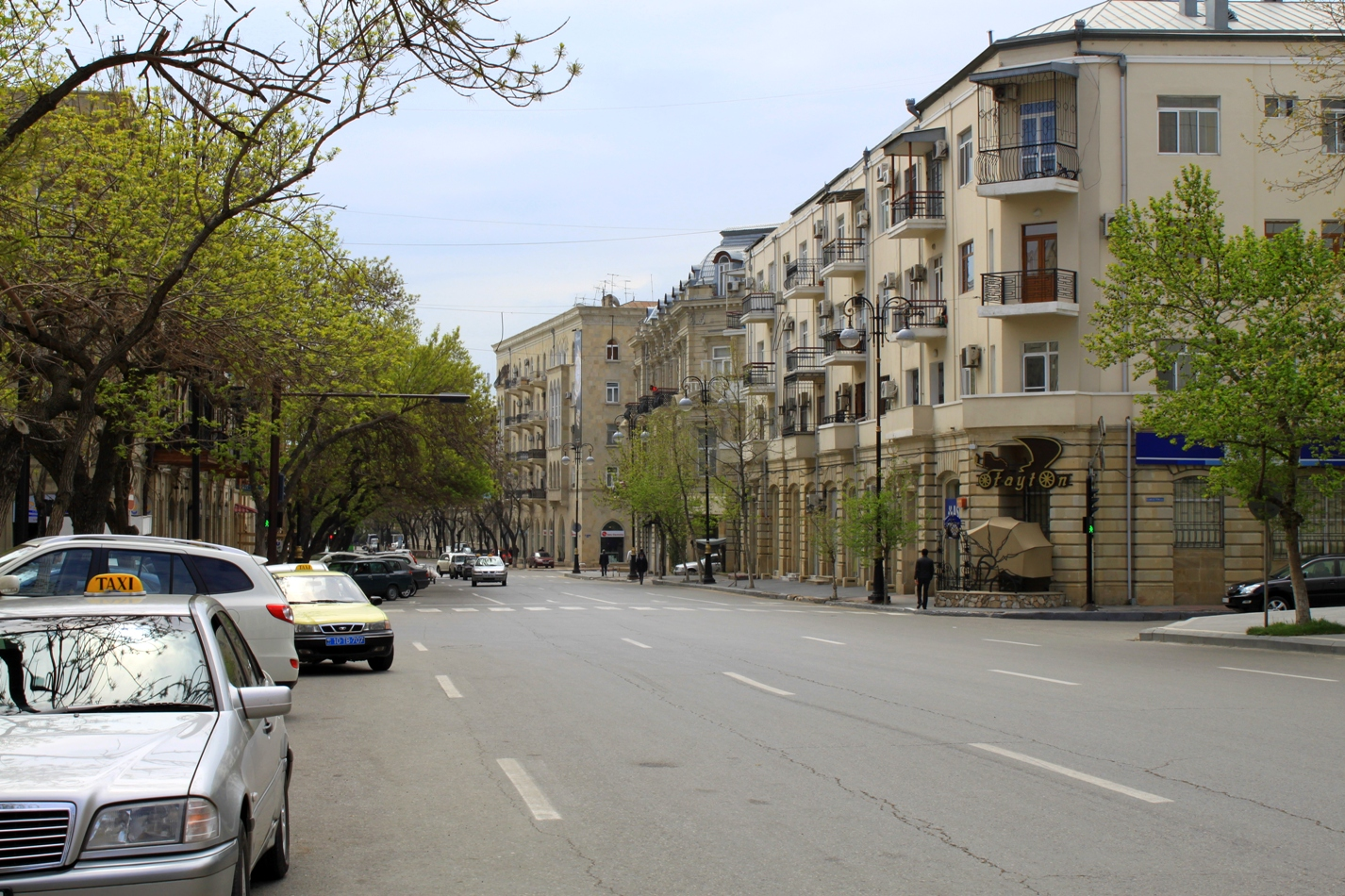
By the Jazz Center of Baku, intersection of 28 May Street in the distance

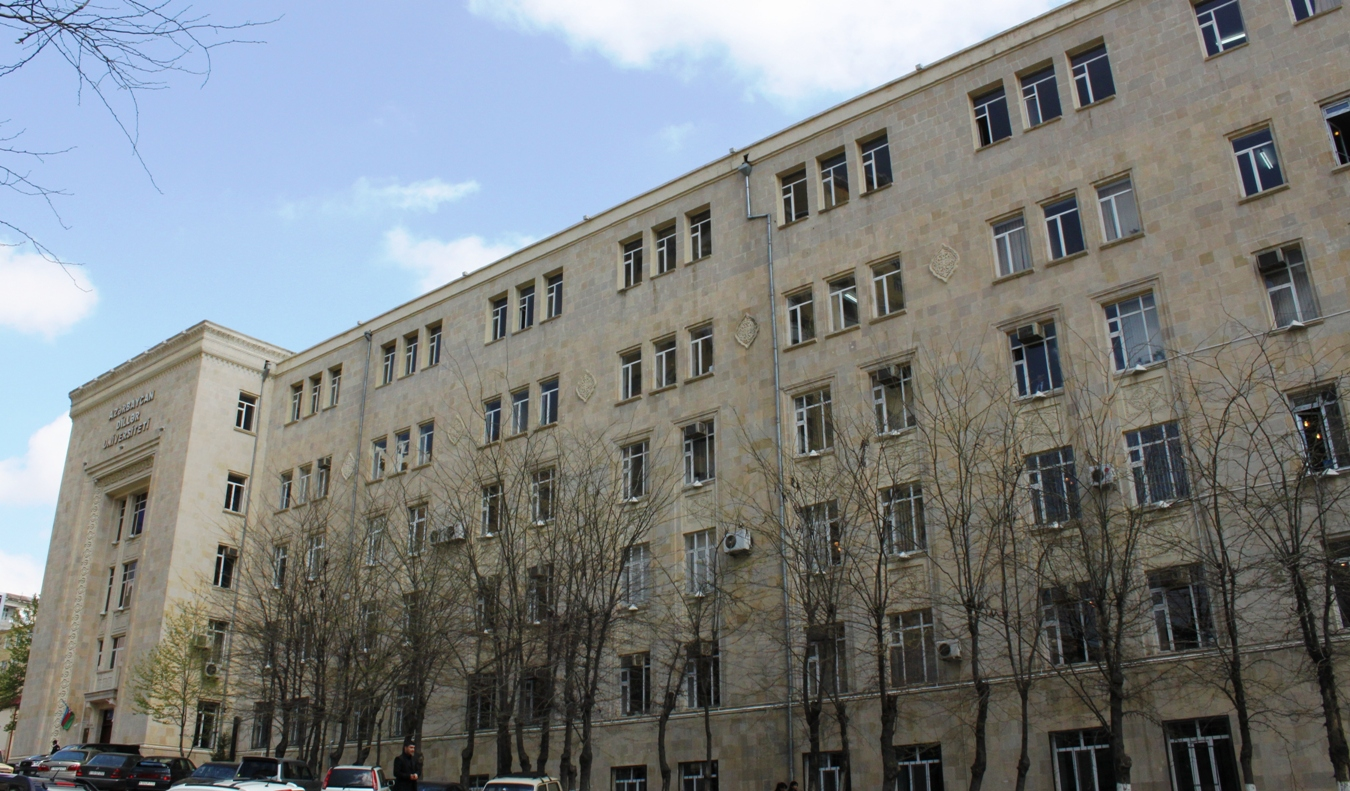
Azerbaijan University of Languages

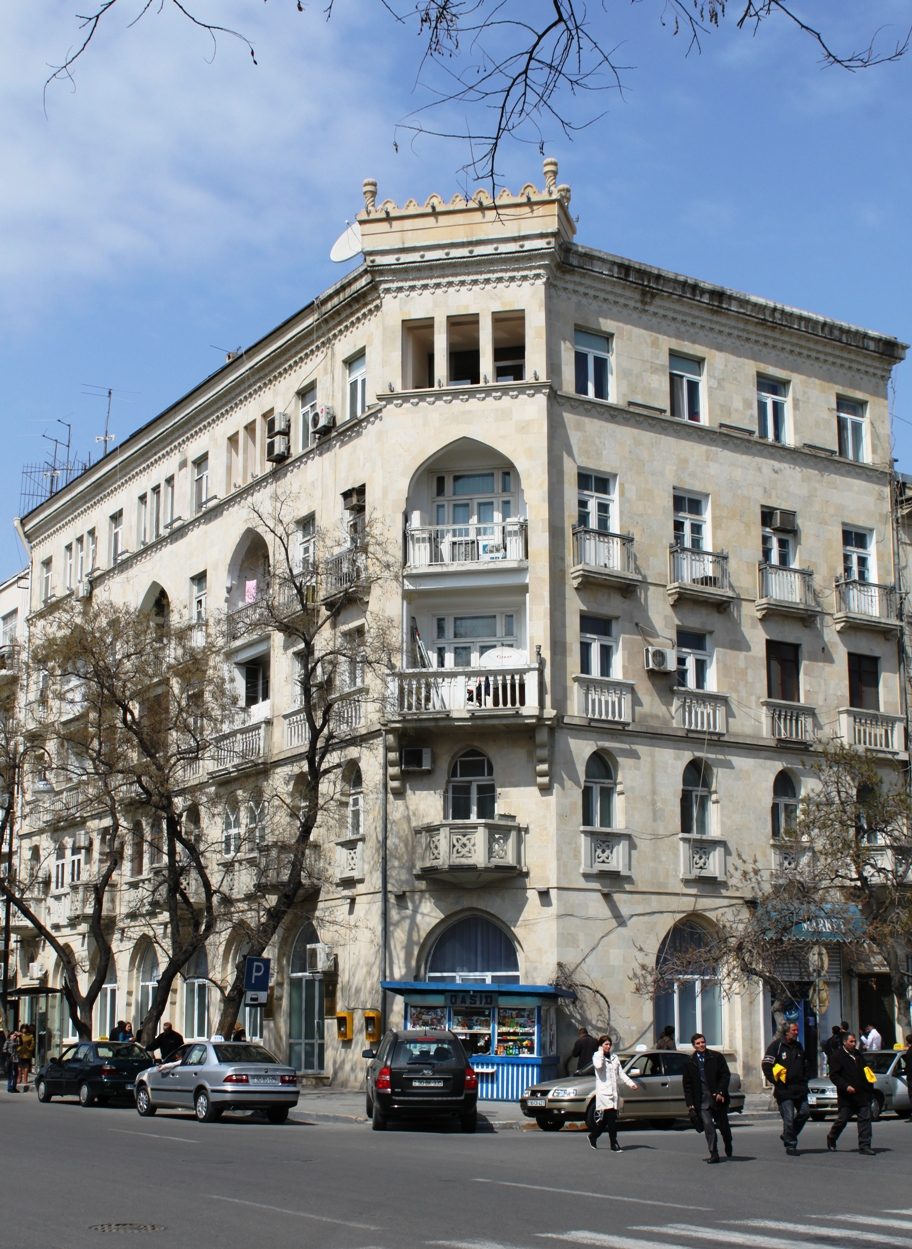
Intersection of Rashid Behbudov and 28 May Streets

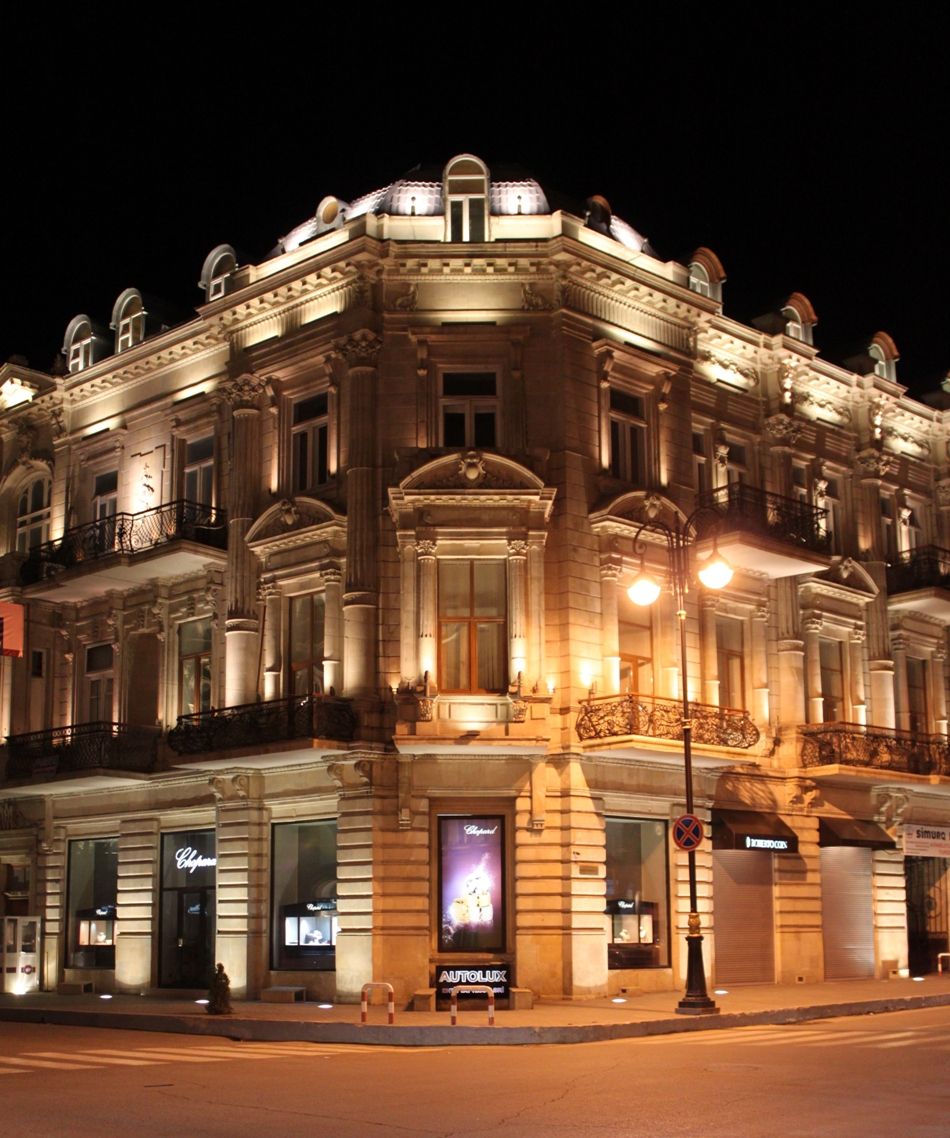
19th-century building

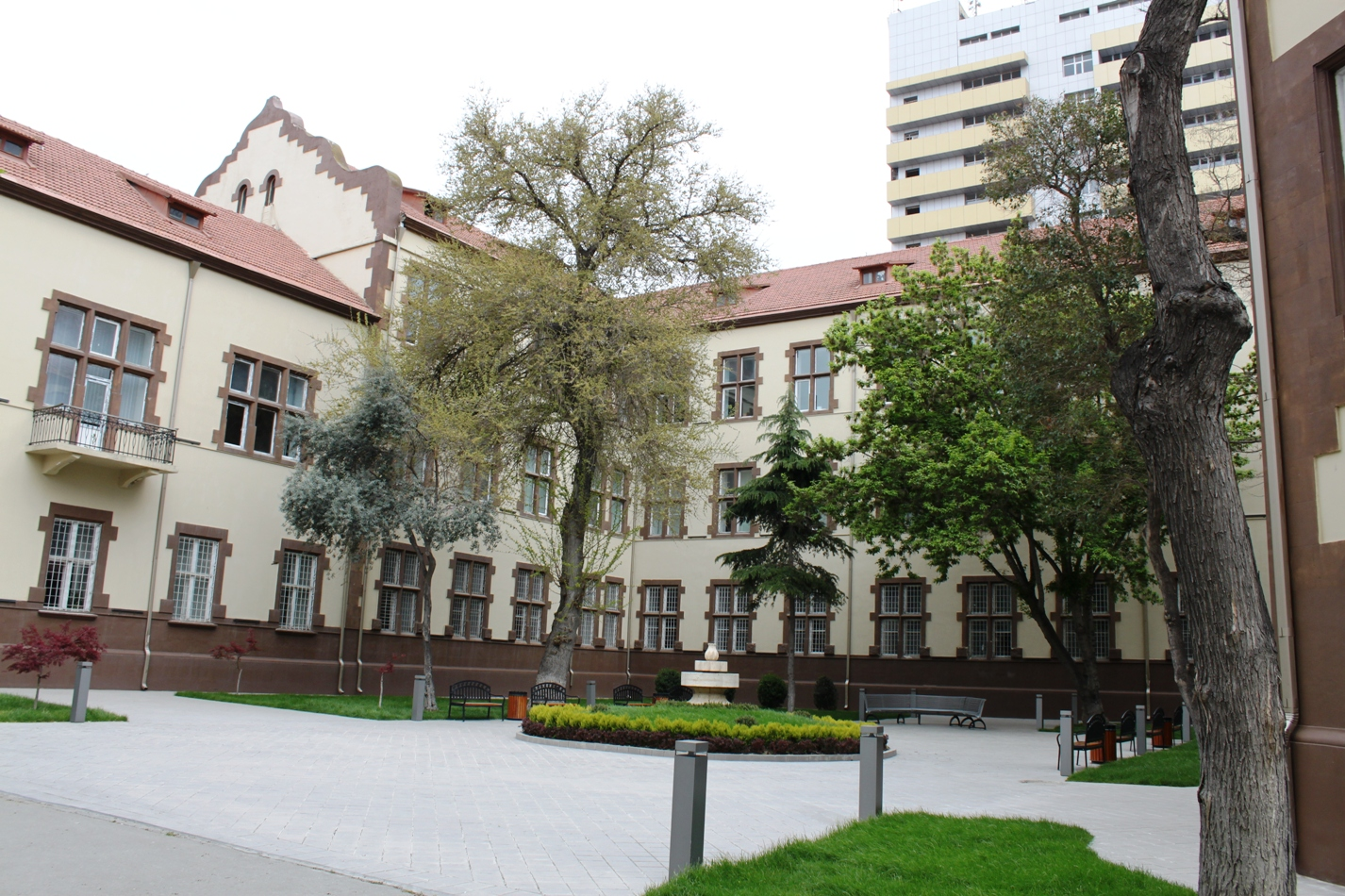
A quite garden

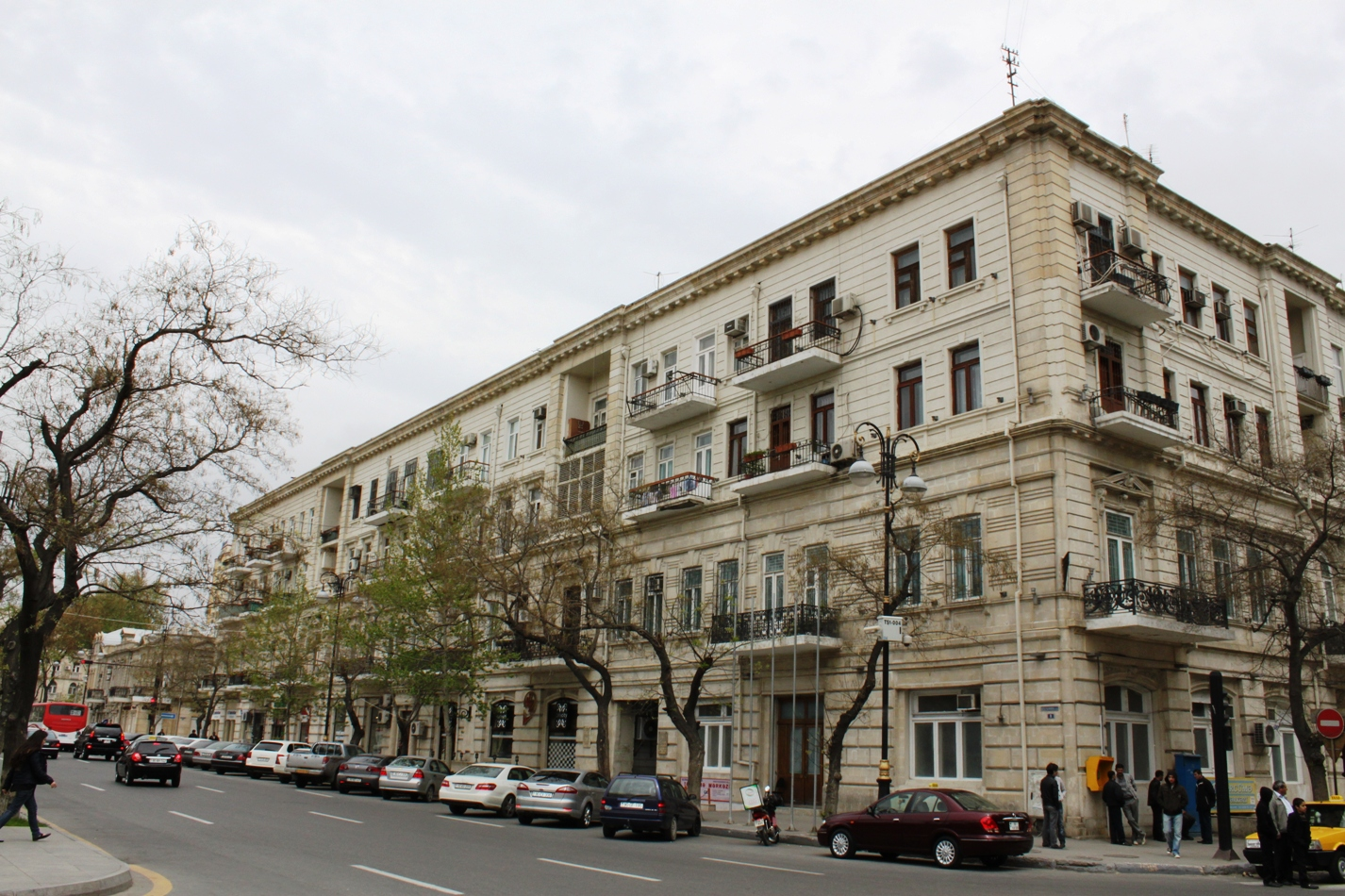
19th-century house

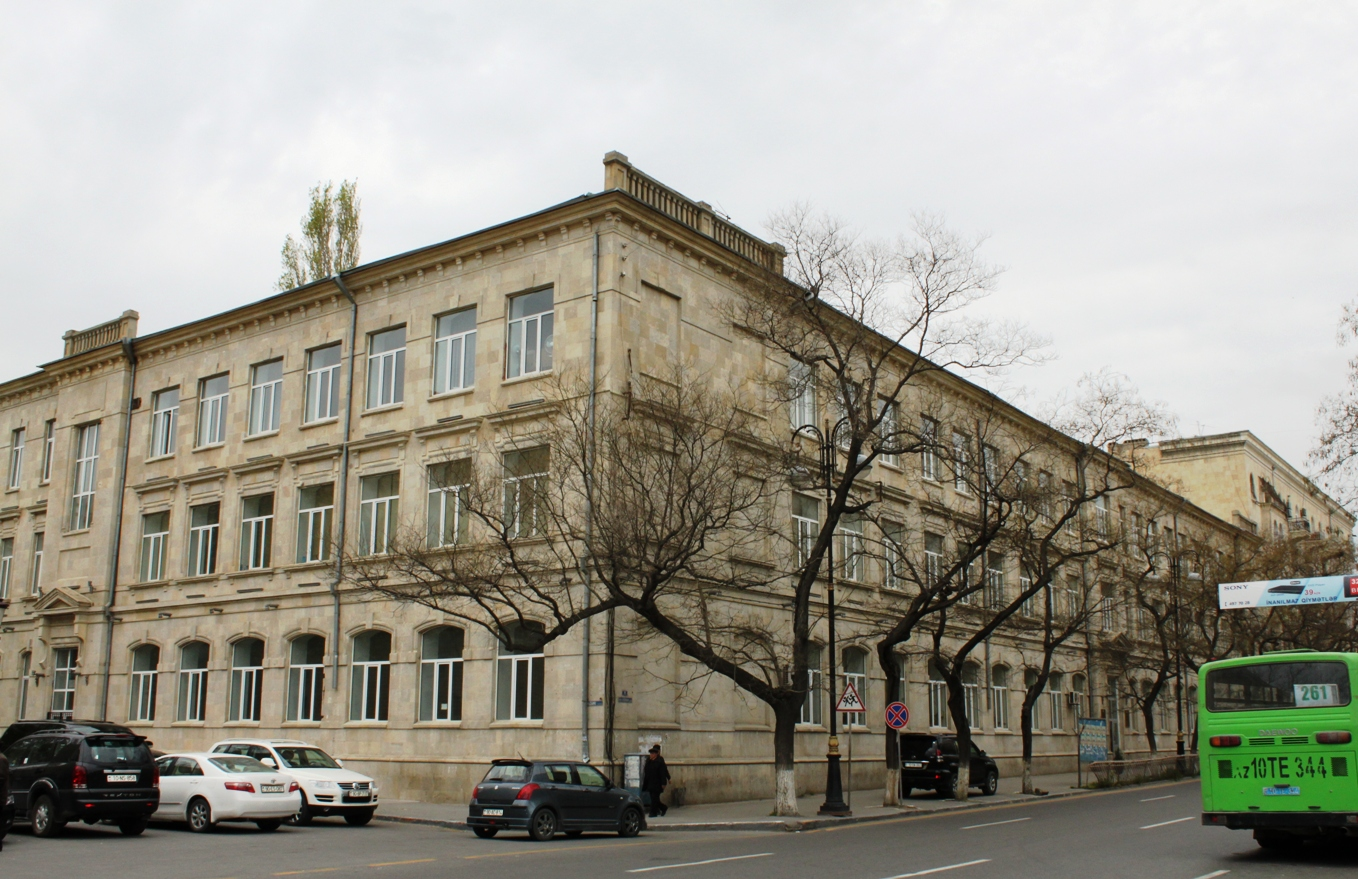
School No. 8

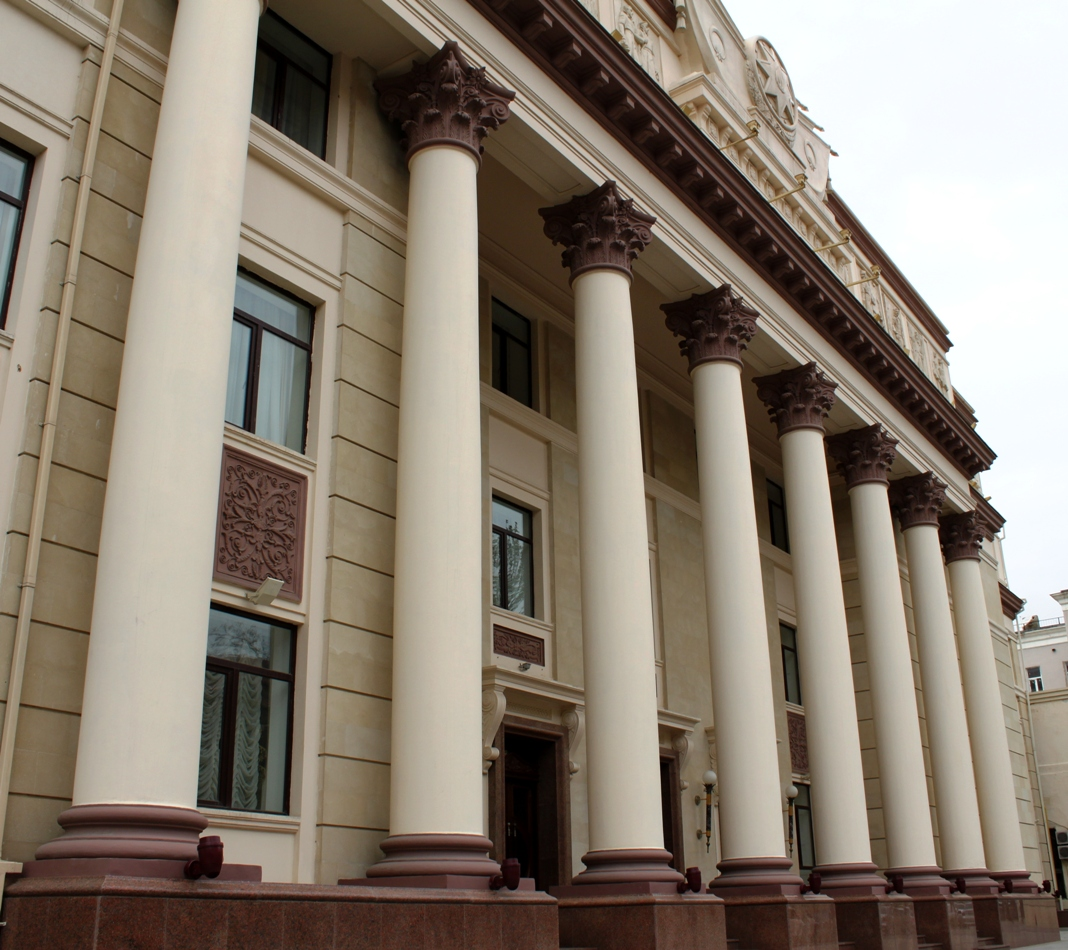
Azerbaijani Musical Arts Museum

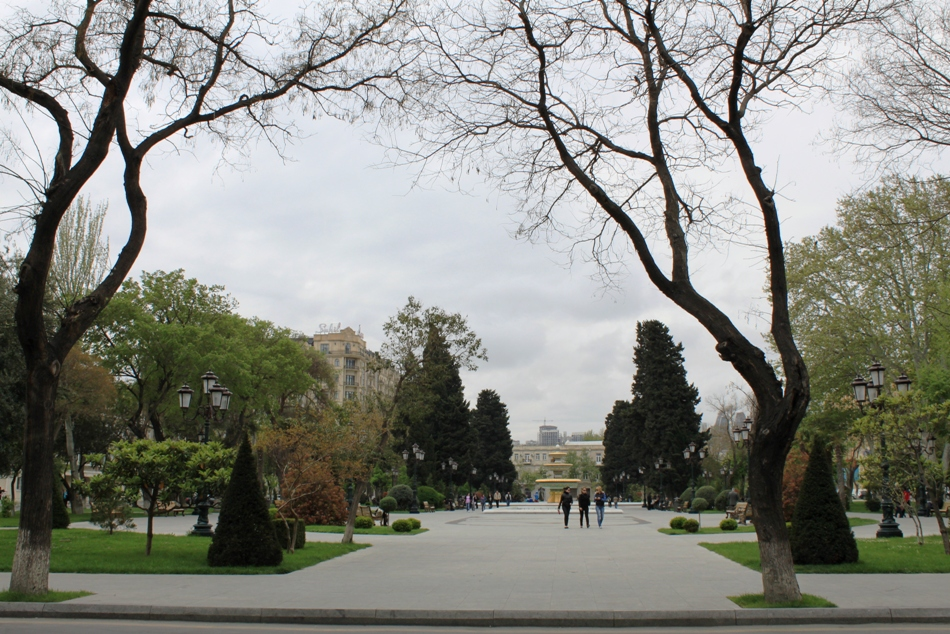
Park

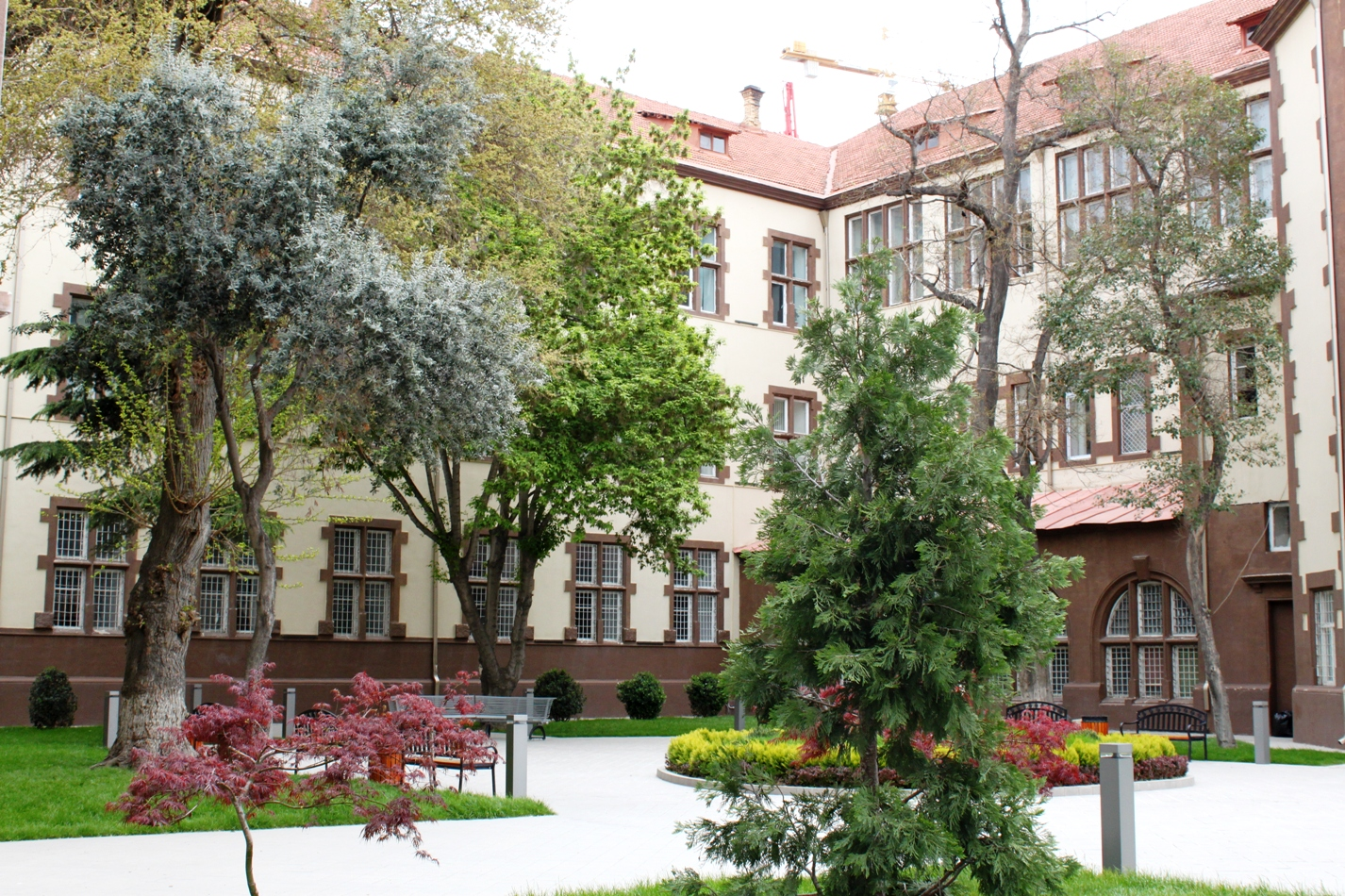
Public garden
