= Soltan Hajibeyov =

Azerbaijani composer

- Soltan Hacıbəyov
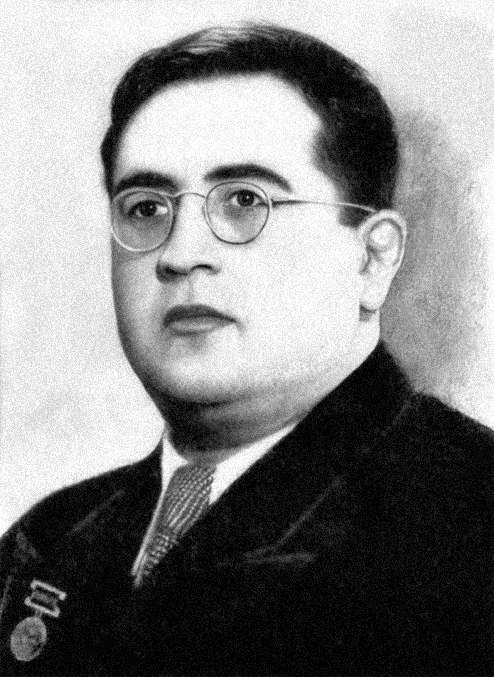
- Born: May 5, 1919; Shusha, Caucasus Viceroyalty, Russian Empire
- Died: September 19, 1974 (aged 55); Baku, Azerbaijan SSR, Soviet Union
- Occupations: Composer; conductor; pianist
- Years active: 1940–1974

Soltan Ismayil oghlu Hajibeyov (Note: Azerbaijani: Soltan İsmayıl oğlu Hacıbəyov; Russian: Султан Исмаил оглы Гаджибеков, romanized: Sultan Ismail ogly Gadzhibekov) (5 May 1919 – 19 September 1974) was an Azerbaijani and Soviet composer. He was awarded the People's Artist of the USSR on 26 July 1973.

== Biography ==
Soltan Hajibeyov was born 5 May 1919 in Shusha, Russian Empire. He was Uzeyir Hajibeyov's cousin. Hajibeyov was a composer who contributed greatly to the formation of the national symphonic music of Azerbaijan. He authored a ballet "Gulshen" (1950), a musical comedy "Red rose" (1940), two symphonies (1944, 1946), "Karavan" (1945), a children's opera "Iskander and a shepherd" (1947) and an overture named Bayram.

Hajibeyov was the Rector of Azerbaijan State Conservatory (now Baku Academy of Music) from 1969 to 1974. He received the Stalin Prize of second degree in 1952 for his ballet "Gulshen" and was awarded the title of People's Artist of the USSR in 1973.

Hajibeyov died on 19 September 1974, in Baku, Azerbaijan SSR, Soviet Union.

== See also ==
- List of People's Artistes of the Azerbaijan SSR
- Osman Hajibeyov
