= Rashid Behbudov =

Azerbaijani singer and actor (1915–1989)

- Rəşid Behbudov
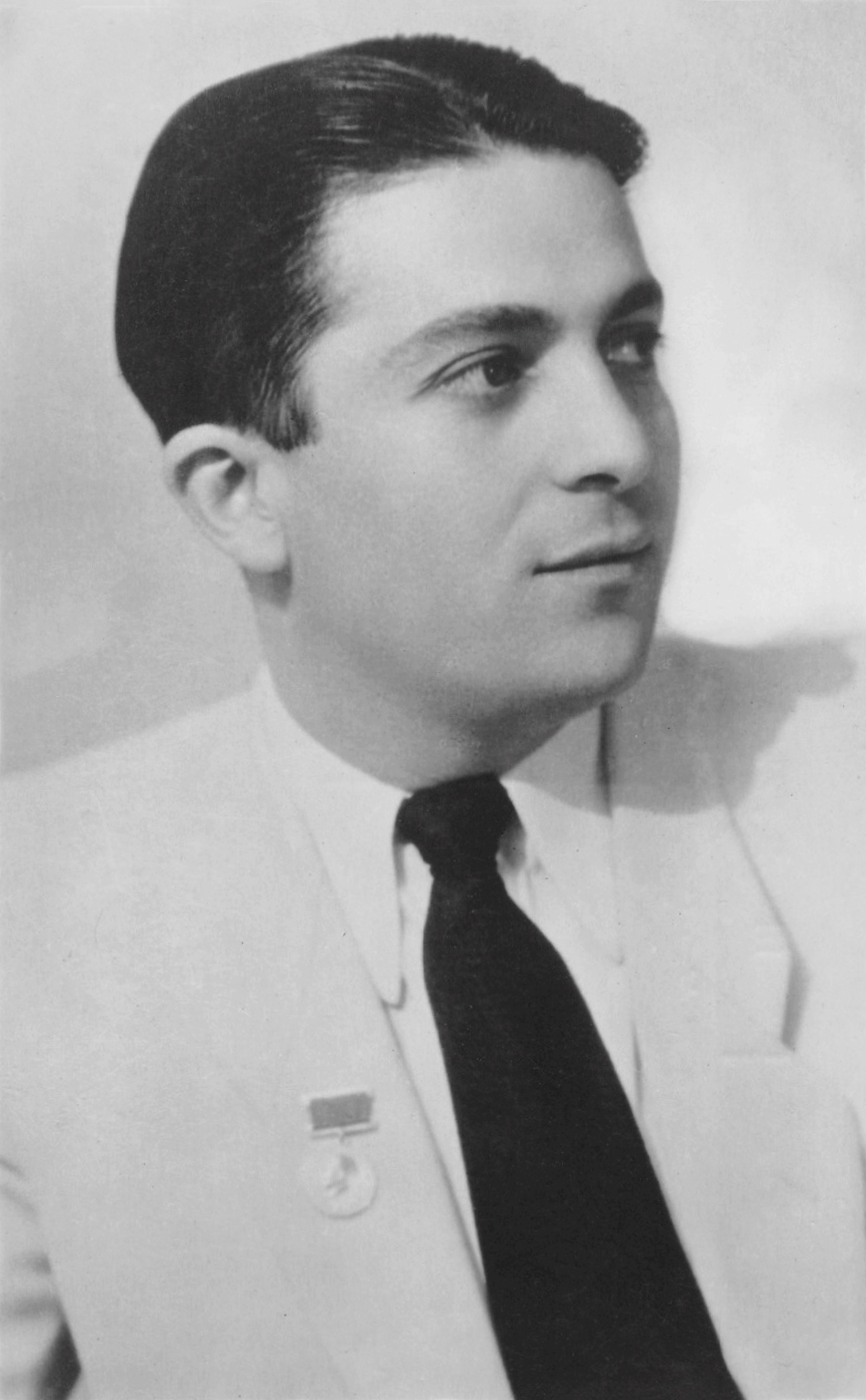
- Behbudov in 1956
- Born: 14 December 1915; Tbilisi, Russian Empire (present-day Georgia)
- Died: 9 June 1989 (aged 73); Moscow, Russian SFSR, Soviet Union
- Occupations: Singer, actor
- Years active: 1933–1988

Rashid Macid oglu Behbudov (Note: Azerbaijani: Rəşid Məcid oğlu Behbudov; Azerbaijani Cyrillic: Рəшид Мәҹид оғлу Беһбудов; Russian: Рашид Меджид оглы Бейбутов, romanized: Rashid Medzhid ogly Beybutov) (14 December 1915 – 9 June 1989) was a Soviet and Azerbaijani singer and actor. He has been referred to as the "golden voice of Azerbaijan". He performed his songs in multiple languages.

== Biography ==
Rashid Behbudov was born in Tbilisi into the family of singer Majid Behbudov and Firuza Vakilova. His siblings included theatre director, Anvar Behbudov; and actress, Najiba Behbudova.

Between 1934 and 1944, Behbudov worked at the Philharmonic Theater in Yerevan. In the mid-1940s, composer and pianist Tofig Guliyev began creative collaboration with Behbudov. In 1945, upon the invitation of Tofig Guliyev, Rashid Behbudov moved to Baku. In the same year, he was assigned the main role of Asgar in the film The Cloth Peddler (1945 film) (Azerbaijani: Arşın Mal Alan), based on a play by Uzeyir Hajibeyov. His role in this film, combined with his vocal skills, brought him fame throughout Azerbaijan.

In a short time, Behbudov also became a prominent Azerbaijani pop singer. His combination of vocal masterpieces ranged from classical performances to lyrical songs. Behbudov's rare vocal talent gave him an opportunity to travel beyond the "Iron Curtain" of the Soviet Union, and as a singer, he toured with concert performances in several countries of the world, including Iran, Turkey, China, India, Japan, Argentina, and many other countries in Europe, Asia, and Latin America. He sang his songs in Russian, Azerbaijani, Armenian, Georgian, and a dozen other languages.

In 1966 he created the State Song Theater, which still carries his name, and became its soloist and artistic manager.

He was married to Jeyran Behbudova, and was the father of opera singer Rashida Rashid.

== Honors and awards ==
- People's Artiste of the Azerbaijan SSR
- People's Artist of the USSR (1959).
- Hero of Socialist Labour (23 April 1980)
- Two Orders of Lenin (6 January 1976, 23 April 1980)
- Order of the Red Banner of Labour (1 February 1966)
- Order of Friendship of Peoples (13 December 1985)
- Stalin Prize, 2nd class (1946) – for his role in the film Asker "Arshin Mal Alan" (1945)
- State Prize of the Azerbaijani SSR (1978)

== Legacy and memory ==
He is the namesake of Rashid Behbudov Street (Azerbaijani: Rəşid Behbudov küçəsi) in Baku; formerly named "Lieutenant Schmidt Street" and renamed in 1991.

On 14 December 2010, FLASHMOB Azerbaijan organized a flash mob to memorialize the honor of Rashid Behbudov and to celebrate the 95th jubilee anniversary of the famous representative of Azerbaijani music and culture.

On 11 June 2016, a monument dedicated to him was erected in front of the State Song Theater named after Rashid Behbudov in Baku.

== Filmography ==
- The Cloth Peddler (1945 film), as Asker
- Bakhtiar (film) (1955), as Bakhtiar
- The 1001st Tour (1974), as Eldar Aliyev

== See also ==
- List of People's Artistes of the Azerbaijan SSR
