= Cantilena =

A cantilena (Italian for "lullaby" and Latin for "old, familiar song") is a vocal melody or instrumental passage in a smooth, lyrical style.

In Corinne, Mme. de Staël criticizes the cantilena [cantilène] as way (and essentially Italian way) of delivering verse, saying that its "monotone chant" [chant monotone] is not suitable for rendering diversity in emotion.
