= Mashadi Jamil Amirov =

Azerbaijani composer

Mashadi Jamil Amirov Azerbaijani: Məşədi Cəmil Əmirov
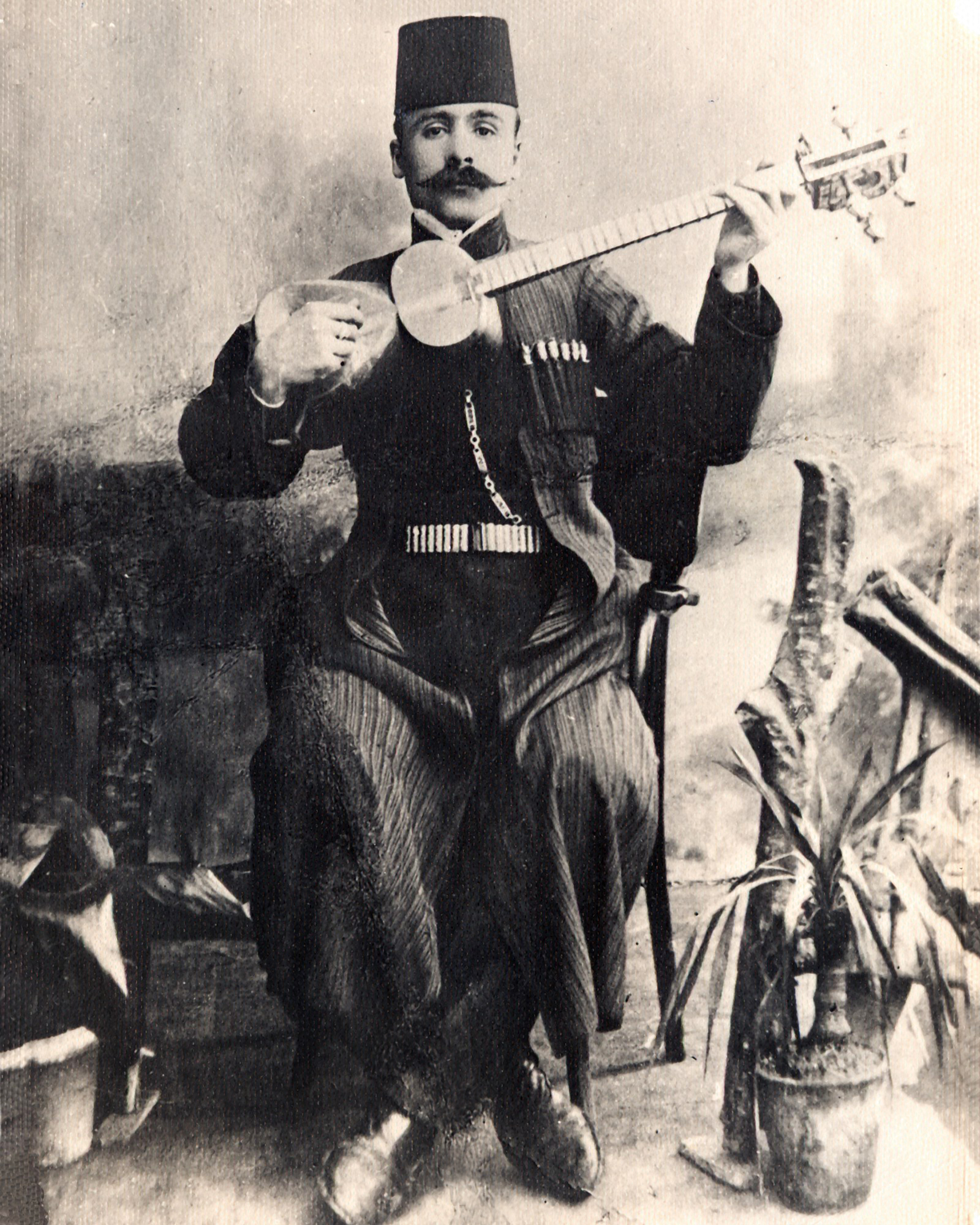

Background information
- Born: Məşədi Cəmil Əmiraslan oğlu Əmirov; 1875; Shusha, Elisabethpol Governorate, Russian Empire
- Origin: Azerbaijani
- Died: 1928 (aged 52–53) Ganja, Azerbaijan SSR, TSFSR, USSR
- Genres: mugham
- Occupation: composer
- Instrument: tar

Mashadi Jamil Amirov (Azerbaijani: Məşədi Cəmil Əmirov, 1875 — 1928) was an Azerbaijani musician, tar-player, composer.

== Biography ==
Mashadi Jamil Amirov was born in Shusha in 1875. He received his first education at madrasa. When Mashad Jalil was 12, his father Karbalayi Amiraslan died, then he started selling peas in the Shusha's square and therefore stopped his education. After some time, Mashadi Jamil is known as a tailor in Shusha.

In 1911 he went to Istanbul to study music. He lived and studied in Istanbul for nearly two years. Mashadi Jamil acted as a promoter of Azerbaijani music in Turkey. Turkish people were seen to play tar on the chest for the first time in Mashadi Jamil's performance. Turkish magazine "Shahbal" had published a great article about Mashadi Jamil and Azerbaijani music.

Russian Empire did not allow Mashadi Jamil, who wanted to open a music school in the city after returning to Ganja. But Jamil Amirov opened a mugham course. This course featured artists such as Seyid Shushinski, Bulbul, Zulfu Adigozalov, Ali Javad oghlu, Abdurrahman Farajov and Musa Shushinski. After the establishment of the USSR in 1921, Mashadi Jamil created a drama troupe in Ganja. The troupe performed with musical dramas and opera performances in Ganja, Shaki and Gazakh for nearly two years.

In 1923, Mashadi Jamil finally got permission to open a music school in Ganja and in the first year 39 students were admitted to the school. Mashadi Jamil's son Fikret Amirov, Ganbar Huseynli, Telman Hajiyev and many others are graduates of this school. In addition, he had taught tar at the school and also led the orchestra of folk instruments. Later, the school grew and became a musical college in 1928–1929 school year.

Mashadi Jamil Amirov died in Ganja in 1928 and was buried in this city.

== Creativity ==
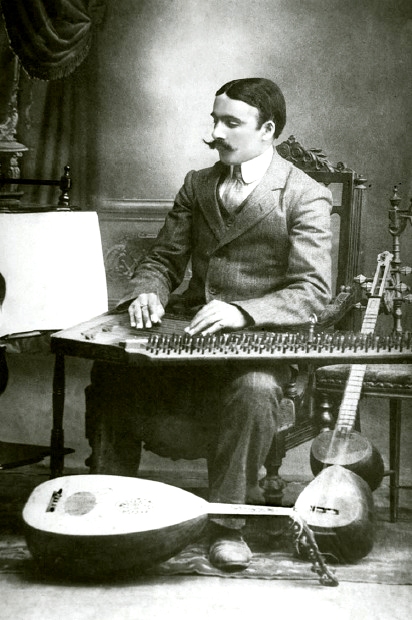
Mashadi Jamil Amirov playing qanun. Elisabethpol (Ganja). 1915.

M.J.Amirov's first tar teacher was a tar-player named Armenak. Like many artists of the era, Mashadi Jamil learns the secrets of classical Azerbaijani mugham from the great musician Mir Mohsun Navvab. For the first time in the Shusha assemblies, he began to sing with Garagoz Zulfugar. In 1907, Mashadi Jamil moved to Ganja, one of the largest cultural centers of Caucasus at that time. Mashadi Jamil accompanies Mashadi Mammad Farzaliyev, Malibayli Hamid, Musa Shushinski and later Bulbul and Seyid Shushinski in Ganja. During his time in Ganja, he also learned to play garmon, kamancha, violin and piano.

In 1910, Jamil Amirov was invited to a "Gramophone" company in Riga with a group of musicians. Here he recorded a number of mugham and folk songs to gramophone record.

Mashadi Jamil has played an important role in the development of theatrical art by working comprehensively in many fields of Azerbaijani music. While he was in Shusha and Ganja, he had successfully performed the roles of "Majnun", "Zayd", "Karam", "Rza bey" and others in the opera and operettas of Uzeyir Hajibeyov, and had conducted the theater orchestras.

He was one of the first musicians that converted Azerbaijani mugham into the note system. He had converted Heyrati mugham in to the notes in 1912 and published in "Shahbal" magazine. Mashadi Jamil, who returned to Ganja in 1913, brings with him both the qanun and the oud. After a long career in 1915, Mashadi Jamil wrote the opera "Seyfal-Mulk" and invited many artists to perform in Ganja. To play the role of "young Seadet lady" from the characters of the opera, a girl with a soft voice was needed, but no performer was found. Finally, Bulbul agreed to play this role. Opera is invited to Tbilisi after playing twice in Ganja and staged at the Kozyanin Theater in Tbilisi on June 3, 1916. The director of the opera was Sidgi Ruhulla. After the Tbilisi tour, the opera was staged in Yerevan.

Mashadi Jamil Amirov wrote the operetta "The Honest Girl" in 1923 and this work was successfully performed in Ganja. In 1924, the opera "The Honest Girl" was published in separate book and sent to many parts of Azerbaijan. The opera was staged in Shusha, Agdash, Shaki, Barda, Zaqatala, Aghdam and Tbilisi.

== Literature ==
- Шушински, Ф. (1985). Азәрбайҹан халг мусигичиләри. Baku: Јазычы. p. 480.

== See also ==
- Fikrat Amirov
- Azerbaijani music
