= Firudin Shushinski =

Firudin Shushinski (born Firudin Mammad oglu Hasanov, 20 October, 1925 – 25 October, 1997) was an Azerbaijani scholar and musicologist who researched Azerbaijani folk music. Shushinski authored more than 400 articles and essays.

== Early life ==
Born in Shusha, Shushinski studied the history of that town which culminated in his book Shusha published in 1968. Shushinski's father was a friend of Firidun bey Kocharli and named his son after him. In 1931, Shushinski started to take violin classes in Shusha musical school. In 1942, during World War II he volunteered for the military and participated in the Battle of Kursk under Soviet General Batov. For his military service, Shushinski was awarded the Medal "For Courage" and the Order of the Red Banner.

== Scholar work ==
After the war, Shushinski studied at the faculty of history of the Azerbaijan State University. Shushinski conducted research in the archives and museums of several cities in the former Soviet Union and bought at his own expense several documents of scholar interest. His first book was about Jabbar Garyaghdioglu and was published in 1964. Shushinski also researched the biographies of Azerbaijani folk musicians Sadigjan and Seyid Shushinski.

After the Russian-language publication of the book Shusha, Shushinski wrote: "Back then, because of the hostile attitude of Armenians towards me, I was unable to travel to Shusha for three years. Everywhere on the streets stones were thrown at me. I had my doors and windows broken and the telephone wire repeatedly cut. I experienced several assassination attempts. Azerbaijanis who at that time lived in Zangibasar Raion of Armenia [...], wrote me a letter, warning that "a reward of 6 million rubles (now about $6 million) was announced for my head". The book Shusha also created a backlash in the Communist Party of Azerbaijan where Shushinski was labelled as "a bourgeois nationalist".

In 1971, the book Folk Musicians of Azerbaijan by Shushinski was published, containing valuable information about virtually unknown musicians of the 18th and 20th centuries.

Shushinski died in Baku at the age of 72 and according to his will, was buried in his native Karabakh region, in the town of Barda.
