= Dastgah-e Shoushtari =

Shushtar (Persian: شوشتر; Azerbaijani: Şüştər) is a musical modal system in traditional mugham music.

This is the fourth and the smallest mode according to its amount of sounds. Sound line is created in amalgamation of two tetra-chords with different method. It has eight membranes and consists of 0.5-1-0.5 tone. In Shushtar mode the third membrane is the completive tone, the fourth membrane is Maye. It creates deep, sad feelings for the listener. Subgenres of Segah includes: Amiri, Shushtar, Masnavi, Movlavi, Tarkib, space for Shushtar. Other mugams relating to the Mugham are: Ovshary, Heydari.
