= Karabakh Shikastasi (mode) =

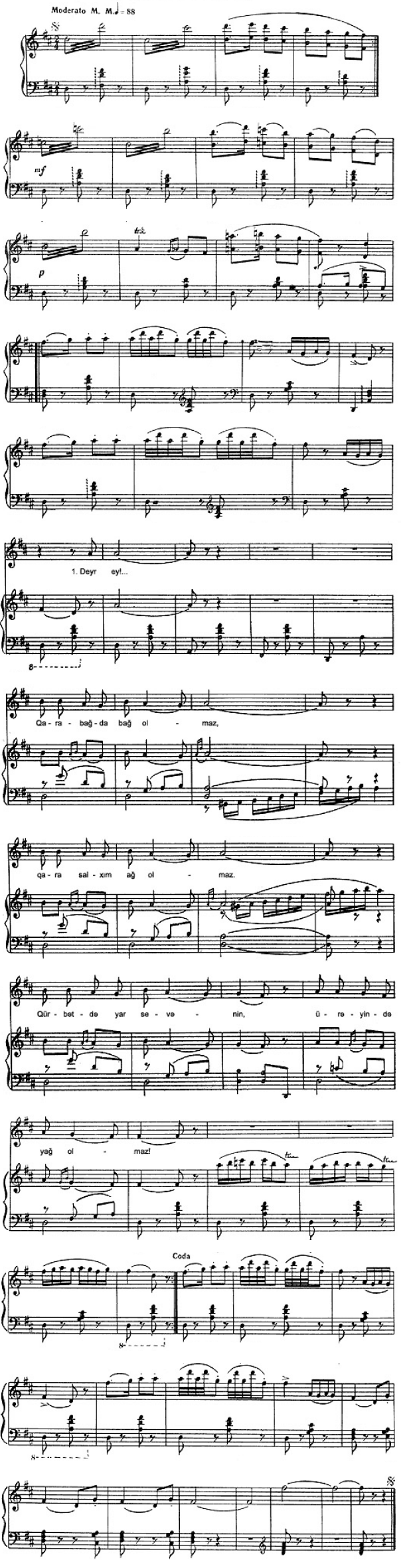
- Form: Mugham
- Scoring: Daf, Tar (lute) and Kamancha

Karabakh Shikastasi (Azerbaijani: Qarabağ şikəstəsi) — is one of the rhythmic Azerbaijani mughams. It is a macama-based segah. Musical size - 2/4. It is performed at a heavy pace. After each verse sung by the singer, a different melody (instrumental episode) is played. It is considered one of the most popular shikeste - lyrical extended songs.

"Karabakh Shikeste" was used in the opera"Asli and Kerem" of Uzeyir Hajibeyov, "Shah Ismail" of Muslim Magomayev,"Shahsenem" of Reingold Glier. The melody of this mugham is played in the 28 May metro station in Baku.

It is believed that "Karabakh shikestesi" was performed with special brilliance by the Peoples Artist of the Azerbaijan SSR Khan Shushinsky.

== See also ==
- Mugham
- Mugham triads
- Music of Azerbaijan
