= Çırpınırdı Qara deniz =

"Çırpınırdı Qara dəniz"

Song
- Language: Azerbaijani
- English title: The Black Sea Raged
- Written: Ahmad Javad
- Published: 1918
- Composer: Uzeyir Hajibeyov

"Çırpınırdı Qara dəniz" ("The Black Sea Raged") is a song written in 1918 by the Azerbaijani composer Uzeyir Hajibeyov on the lyrics of the poet Ahmad Javad. The song is popular in Turkey. In Azerbaijan, the song is especially popular in the performance of Azerin, a People's Artist of the Azerbaijan Republic.

== Song’s history ==
Excited by the participation of the Ottoman Turkey in the First World War, the Azerbaijani poet Ahmed Javad wrote, in December 1914, the poem "The Black Sea raged". In 1918, Uzeyir Hajibeyov wrote the music to the poet's lyrics. However, after 1920, the song was not performed in Azerbaijan. Due to the fact that there were no notes, the song was almost forgotten. Despite this, the song gained popularity in Turkey, being played on radio and television, at official events and banquets. It is even noted that Atatürk himself, upon hearing the song for the first time, shed tears.

In 1990, Suleyman Shenel, a lecturer at the Istanbul Technical University, who was then an intern at the Azerbaijan State Conservatory, reported this song to the Hajibeyov Memorial House-Museum. The song was firstly performed in front of the public in Azerbaijan on 10 March 1993 in the Republic Palace in Baku. The event took place within the jubilee evening dedicated to the 100th anniversary of Ahmed Javad.

== Lyrics ==
External videos
- Performed by Azerin
- At a concert in Turkey

External videos
- Performed by Araz Elses
- Araz Elses on the grave of Abulfaz Elchibey, August 28, 2000

Azerbaijani

Çırpınırdı Qara dəniz
Baxıb Türkün bayrağına!
Ah! deyərdin, heç ölməzdin
Düşə bilsən ayağına!
Dost elindən əsən yellər,
Bana şeir, salam söylər!
Olsun bizim bütün ellər
Qurban Türkün bayrağına!
Yol ver Türkün bayrağına!

İncilər tök,gəl yoluna,
Sırmalar səp sağ,soluna!
Fırtınalar dursun yana,
Salam Türkün bayrağına!

«Həmidiyyə» o Türk qanı!
Həç birinin bitməz şanı!
«Kazbek» olsun ilk qurbanı!
Heyran Türkün bayrağına!

Dost elindən əsən yellər,
Bana şer,salam söylər.
Olsun turan bütün ellər
Qurban Türkün bayrağına!
Yol ver Türkün bayrağına!!!

== See also ==
- Daughter of the mountains – Reyhan
