= Seyfəli =

Seyfəli may refer to:

- Aşağı Seyfəli
- Yuxarı Seyfəli
- Seyfali Kandi
