= Jamo bey Jabrayilbeyli =

- Cəmo bəy Cəbrayılbəyli
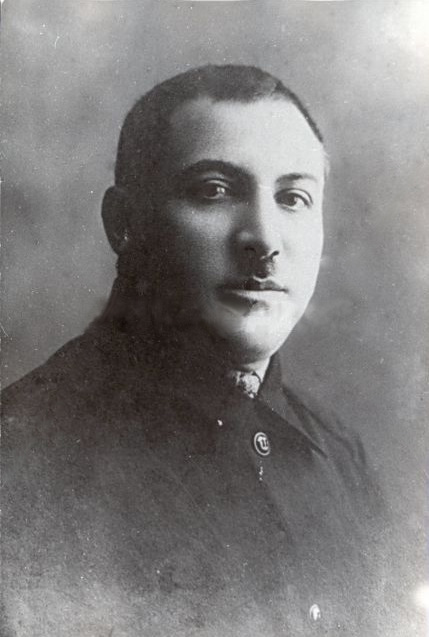
- Born: Cəmo bəy Adil bəy oğlu Cəbrayılbəyli; 29 January 1887; Shamakhi, Baku Governorate, Russian Empire
- Died: 30 July 1965 (aged 78); Baku, Azerbaijan SSR, Soviet Union
- Resting place: Yeddi Gumbaz cemetery, Shamakhi
- Occupations: Educator, methodologist, publicist, writer
- Writing career
- Language: Azerbaijani

Jamo bey Adil bey oghlu Jabrayilbeyli (Azerbaijani: Cəmo bəy Adil bəy oğlu Cəbrayılbəyli; 29 January 1887 – 30 July 1965) was an Azerbaijani educator, methodologist, publicist and writer. It has been claimed that he wrote the lyrics of the National Anthem of Azerbaijan, which are traditionally attributed to Ahmad Javad.

== Early life and education ==
Jabrayilbeyli was born on 29 January 1887 in Shamakhi, then part of the Baku Governorate of the Russian Empire. His father, Adil bey Jabrayilbeyov, was a descendant of the Shamakhi nobility and worked as a clerk in the Sunni religious administration in Shamakhi.

After losing his father at an early age, Jabrayilbeyli studied at the Shamakhi city school from 1896 to 1901 with the support of Mir Jafar Seyidzade, the son of Seyid Azim Shirvani. In 1908, he passed an examination before a special commission and received a teaching certificate. He worked as a teacher in Shamakhi until 1919.

== Teaching career ==
After moving to Baku, Jabrayilbeyli worked in several schools. In 1926, after the boys' and girls' teacher seminaries were merged into the Baku United Pedagogical Technical School, he served as deputy director for academic affairs. The institution trained teachers for Azerbaijan, Central Asia and Dagestan.

Jabrayilbeyli took part in educational projects of the People's Commissariat of Education and contributed to Azerbaijani pedagogical and children's publications. His writings appeared in periodicals such as Maarif, Qızıl yıldız, Qırmızı günəş and Yeni yıldız. He wrote nature stories, poems and marches, and translated or adapted works from Russian and European literature for schoolchildren.

In 1942, Jabrayilbeyli received an academic degree.

== Musical activity ==
Jabrayilbeyli was also active in musical circles. During an event held on 5 November 1924 at the House of Education, singer Yaver Kelenterli performed the mugham Mahur-hindi, accompanied by Badalbey Badalbeyli on tar and Jabrayilbeyli on violin. According to a later account, Uzeyir Hajibeyov advised Kelenterli after the performance to attend a mugham circle.

== Literary activity ==
Jabrayilbeyli wrote poems under the pen names Jamo bey and Jamo. His poem Sənsən was published under the signature Jamo in the second issue of the literary, scientific and political journal Yeni yıldız in 1922. The same issue also included his article İctimai hifzi-səhhət (lit. 'Public Hygiene').

Some Azerbaijani authors have claimed that the words of the National Anthem of Azerbaijan may have been written by Jabrayilbeyli rather than Ahmad Javad. The claim is based on the publication of the poem Vətən marşı (lit. 'March of the Fatherland') under the signature Jamo bey in the 1919 poetry collection Milli nəğmələr (lit. 'National Songs').

== Works ==
Jabrayilbeyli wrote textbooks, methodological works, terminology booklets and children's prose. His works include:

- Tarixi-təbii (lit. 'Natural History'), Baku, 1919
- Heyvanat dərsləri (lit. 'Lessons on Animals'), Baku, Azərnəşr, 1924
- Təbiətə ilk addım (lit. 'First Step into Nature'), Baku, Azərnəşr, 1924
- Müxtəsər nəbatat (lit. 'Brief Botany'), Baku, Azərnəşr, 1924 and 1926
- Təbiəti öyrən (lit. 'Study Nature'), Baku, Azərnəşr, 1926
- Heyvanat dərsləri (lit. 'Lessons on Animals'), Baku, Azərnəşr, 1928 and 1929
- Təbiyyat (lit. 'Natural Science'), Baku, Azərnəşr, 1929
- Təbiyyat metodikası (lit. 'Methodology of Natural Science'), Baku, Azərnəşr, 1930
- Akvarium və terrarium (lit. 'Aquarium and Terrarium'), Baku, Azərnəşr, 1930
- Bitkilər fiziolojisi terminləri (lit. 'Terms of Plant Physiology'), Baku, Azərnəşr, 1931
- Fito-sosioloji terminləri (lit. 'Phytosociological Terms'), Baku, Azərnəşr, 1931
- Hekayələr (lit. 'Stories'), Baku, Uşaqgəncnəşr, 1947
- Maraqlı hekayələr (lit. 'Interesting Stories'), Baku, Uşaqgəncnəşr, 1956
- Təbiət haqqında hekayələr (lit. 'Stories about Nature'), Baku, Azərnəşr, 1963
- Xatirələrim (lit. 'My Memoirs'), Baku, Azərnəşr, 1966

== Death and legacy ==
Jabrayilbeyli died on 30 July 1965. He is buried in the Yeddi Günbəz cemetery in Shamakhi, near the mausoleum of Mirza Alakbar Sabir.

A monograph titled Cəmo bəy Cəbrayılbəyli: həyatı və bədii yaradıcılığı (lit. 'Jamo bey Jabrayilbeyli: His Life and Literary Work') by Asif Rustamli was later published by the Nizami Ganjavi Institute of Literature.
