= House-Museum of Uzeyir Hajibeyov (Shusha) =

- Üzeyir Hacıbəyovun ev-muzeyi
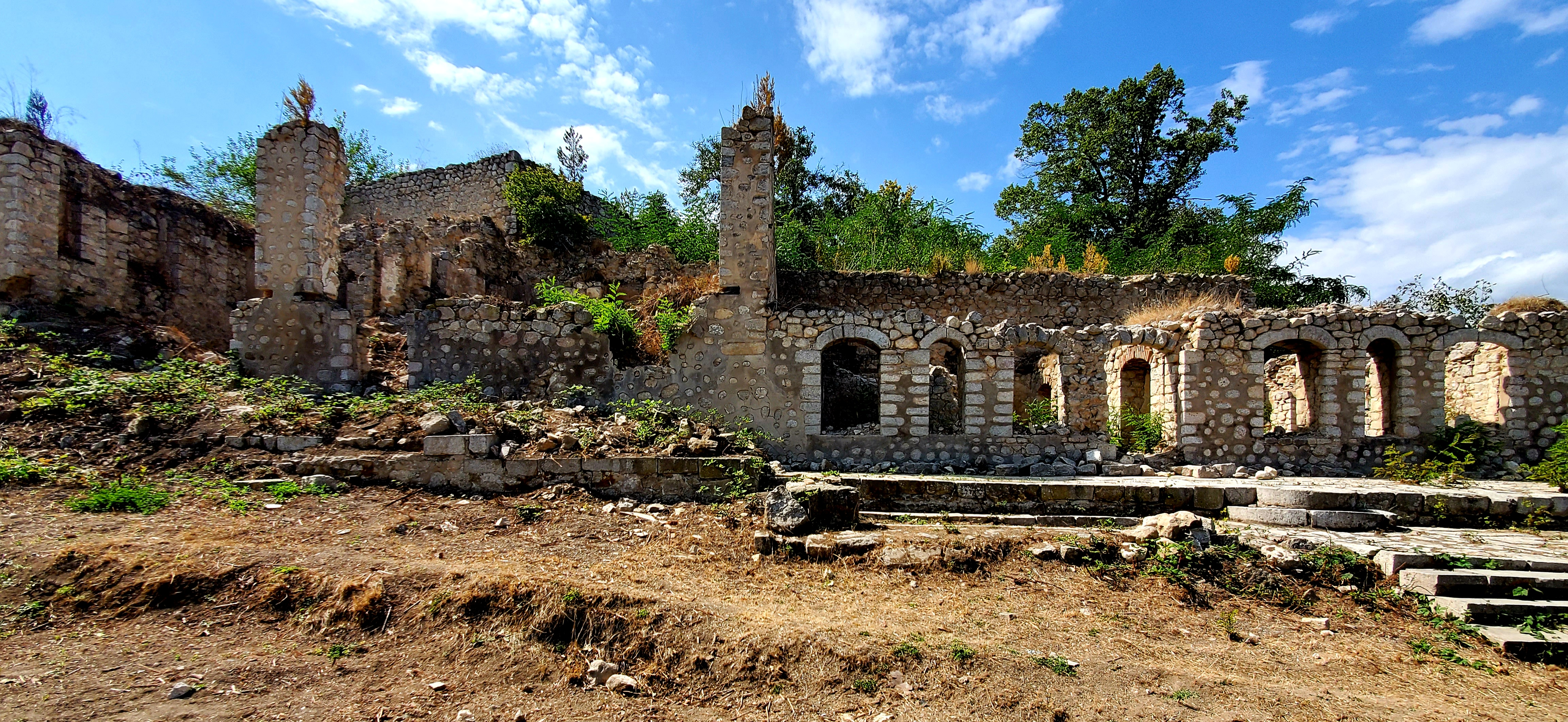
- Interactive map of the House-Museum of Uzeyir Hajibeyov area

General information
- Type: House, museum
- Location: M.F.Akhundov Street, 19, Shusha, Azerbaijan
- Coordinates: 39°45′N 46°45′E
- Completed: 1959

House-Museum of Uzeyir Hajibeyov (Azerbaijani: Üzeyir Hacıbəyovun ev‑muzeyi) is the museum located in Shusha of Uzeyir Hajibeyov, an Azerbaijani composer, musicologist, publicist, playwright, teacher and public figure, founder of the professional musical art of the modern Azerbaijan and of the national opera.

The museum functioned between 1959 and 1992. Only 136 items out of 1700 were saved.

After the recapture of the city of Shusha by the Azerbaijani army on 7 November 2020, the restoration works of the museum began.

== History and description ==
After the death of Uzeyir Hajibeyov (23 November 1948), the Council of Ministers of the Azerbaijan SSR adopted a resolution to perpetuate his memory (16 February 1949). The Paragraph 4 of the ordinance stated:

Instruct the Department of Arts under the Council of Ministers of the Azerbaijan SSR to create an apartment-museum of Hajibeyov in the city of Baku on the 75 Ketskhoveli street, and in the city of Shusha.

The house where the composer spent his childhood and youth was built in the 19th century. The house-museum began functioning in 1959 with the support of the Azerbaijan Academy of Sciences, the Azerbaijan History Museum, the Ministry of Culture and the Music Fund. In the beginning, the museum consisted of 4 rooms. Subsequently, by the centenary of the composer in 1985, the museum was expanded, being turned into a Memorial House with two-story and one-story parts. The organizations that were subordinated to the Ministry of Culture, in particular the Museum of History of Azerbaijan, transferred a number of items belonging to the composer to the house-museum of Hajibeyov. A plaster statue of Hajibeyov was also installed in the museum. The museum operated until the capture of the city of Shusha in 1992 by the armed forces of Artsakh. After that, the museum continued its activities in the house-museum of Hajibeyov located in the city of Baku.

After the battle of shusha, which was won by the Azerbaijani armed forces, there was approved a project to restore the house-museum of Uzeyir Hajibeyov in 2021. Currently, there are ongoing reparation and restoration works.

== Exhibition ==
Valuable materials related to the first years of Uzeyir Hajibeyov's life were presented here - exhibits regarding his student years, photographs of relatives and family members, manuscripts of the first works, as well as the personal belongings of the composer reflecting his activities. In the second, third and fourth rooms, exhibits regarding Hajibeyov's life and work during the Soviet period were exposed. A statue of the composer was installed in the second room.

Before the occupation of the city of Shusha by the Armenian armed forces, the museum had about 1700 exhibits. After the city was occupied, 136 exhibits of the museum in Shusha were transported to Baku, namely to the house-museum of Hajibeyov.

== Photogallery ==
Museum building:

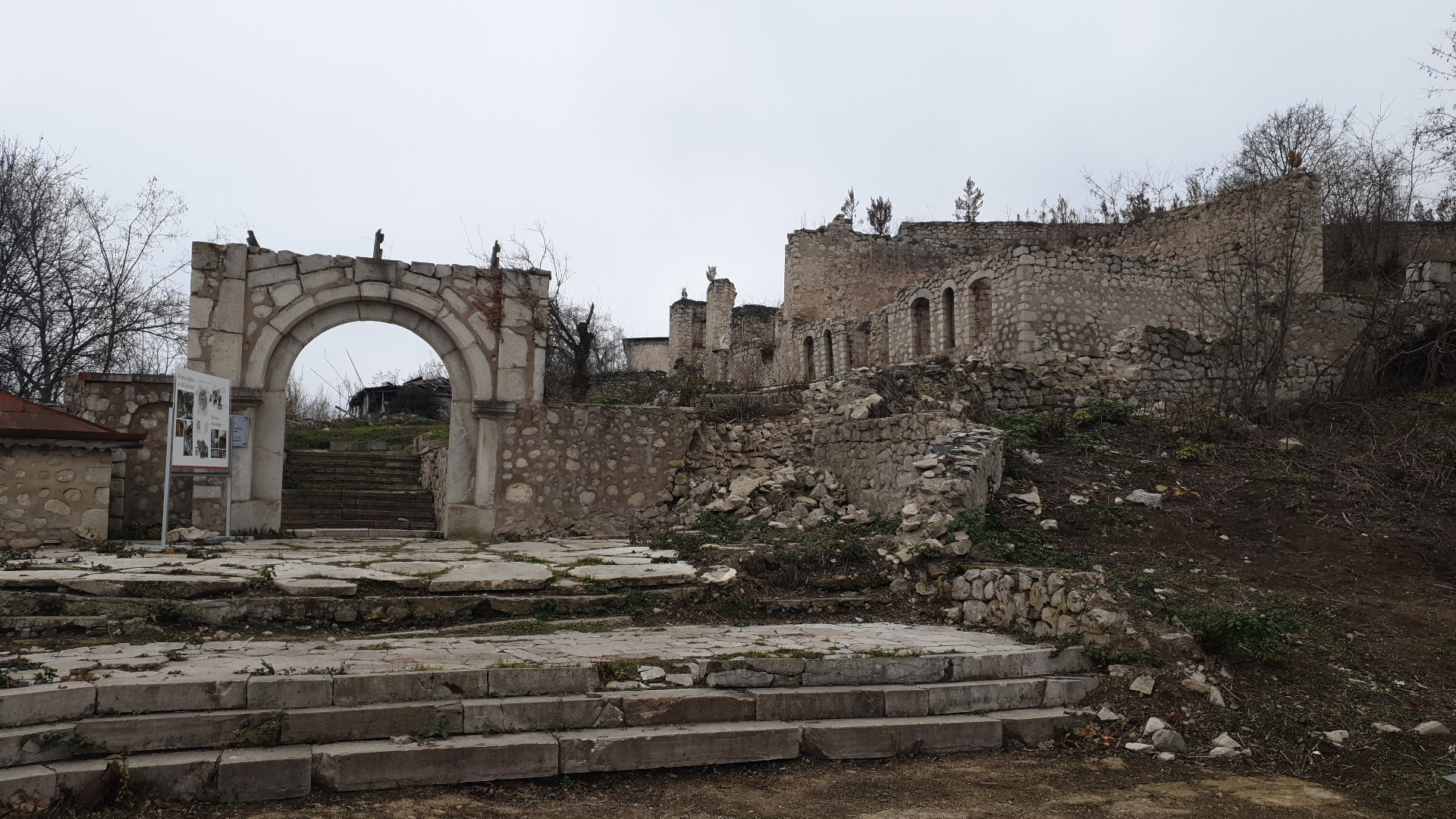

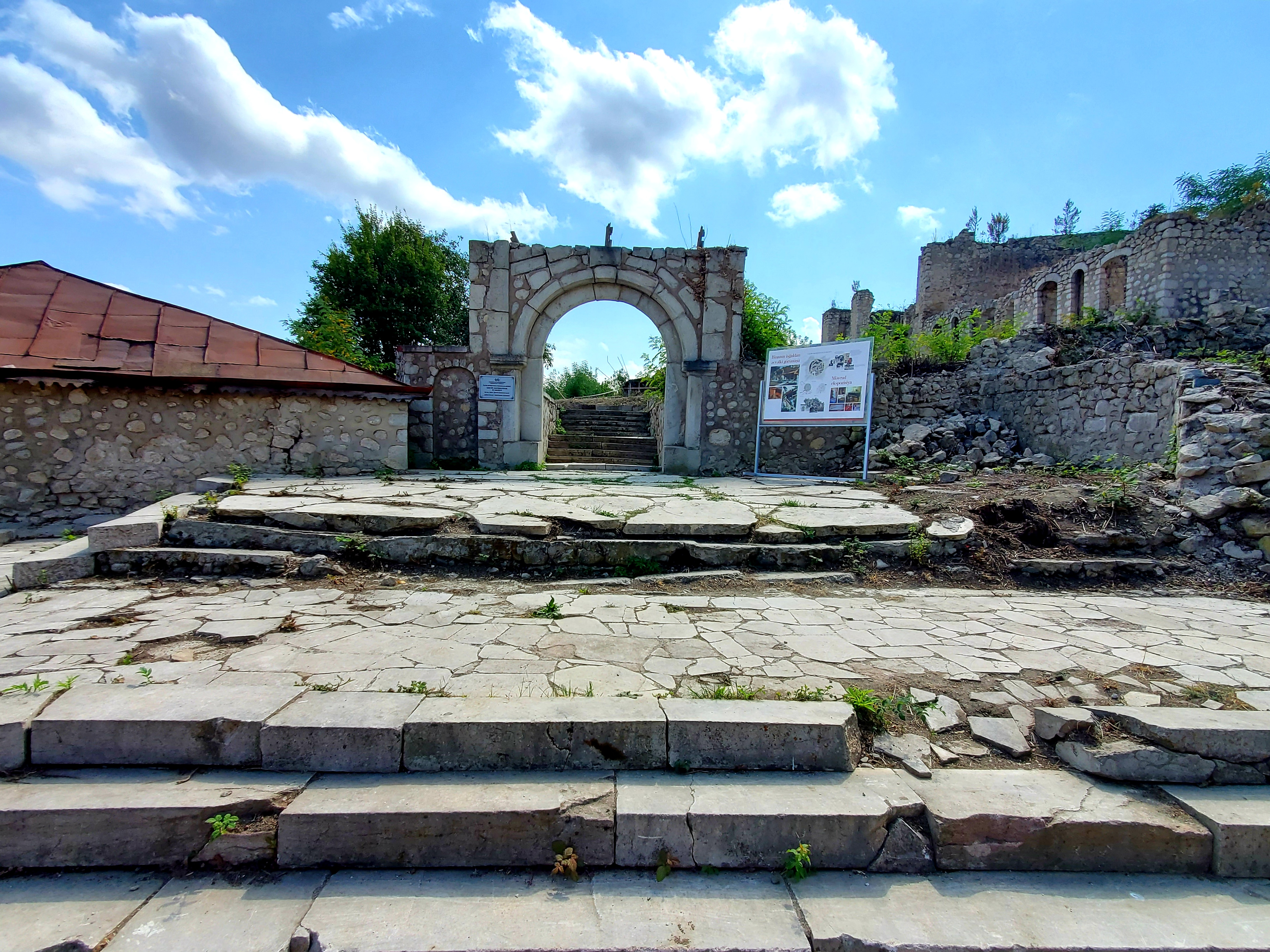

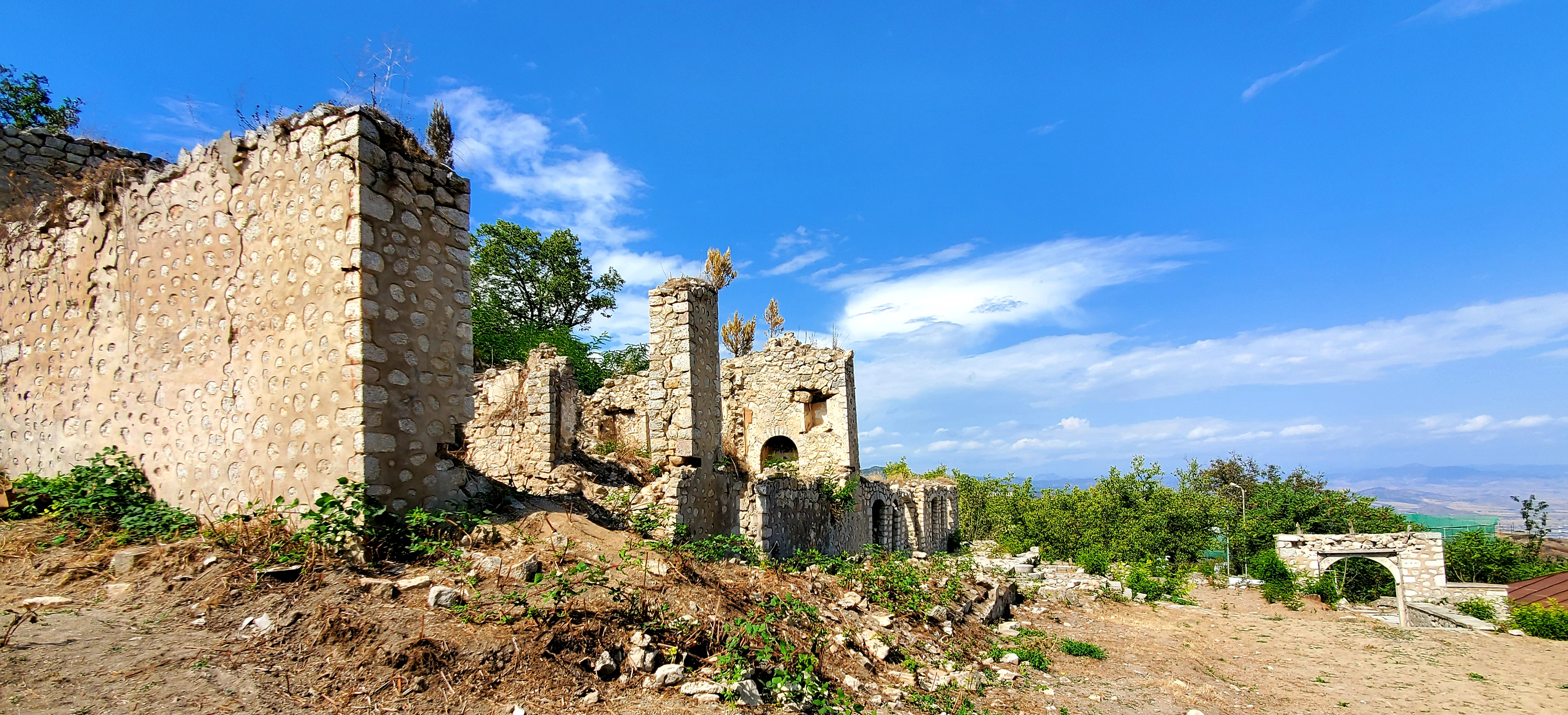

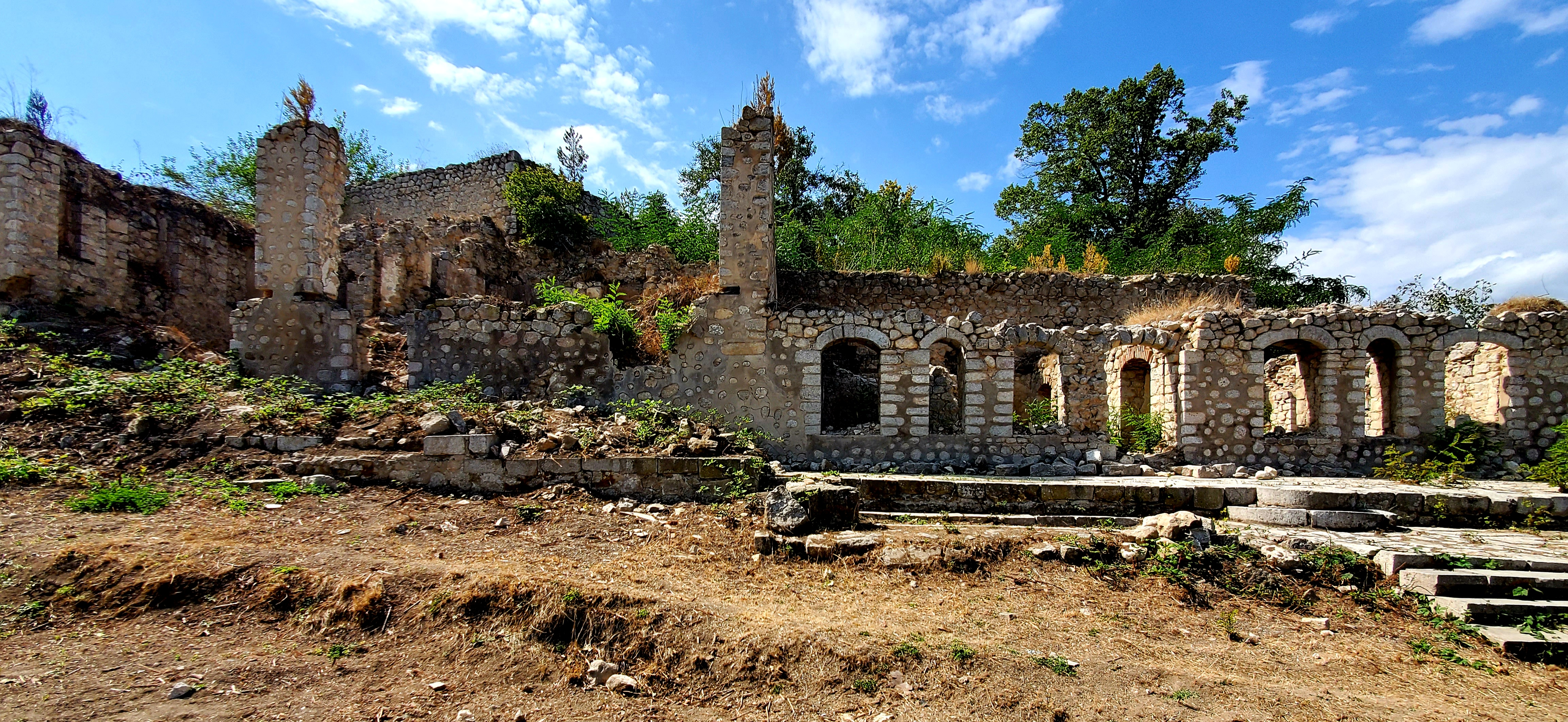

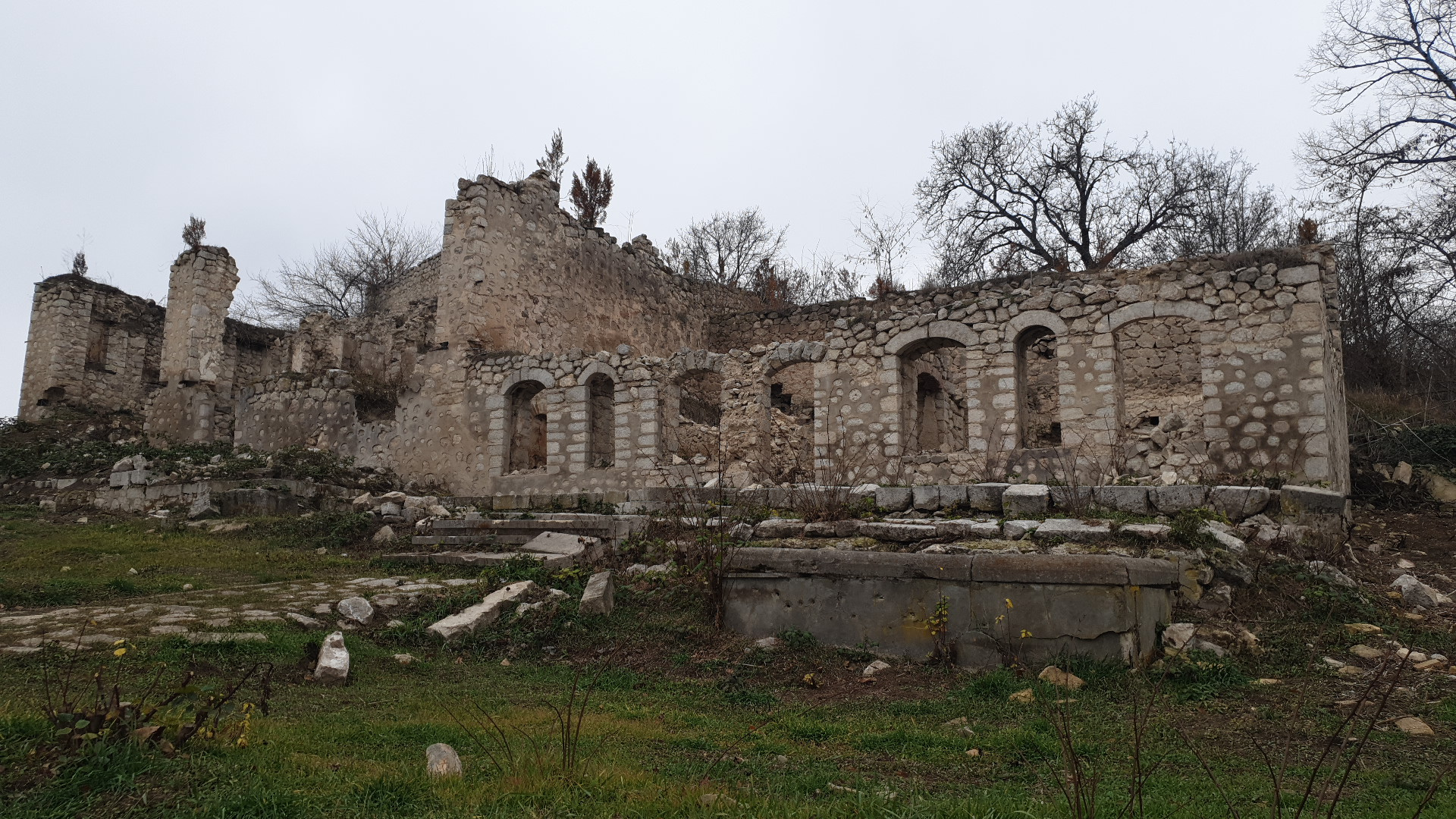

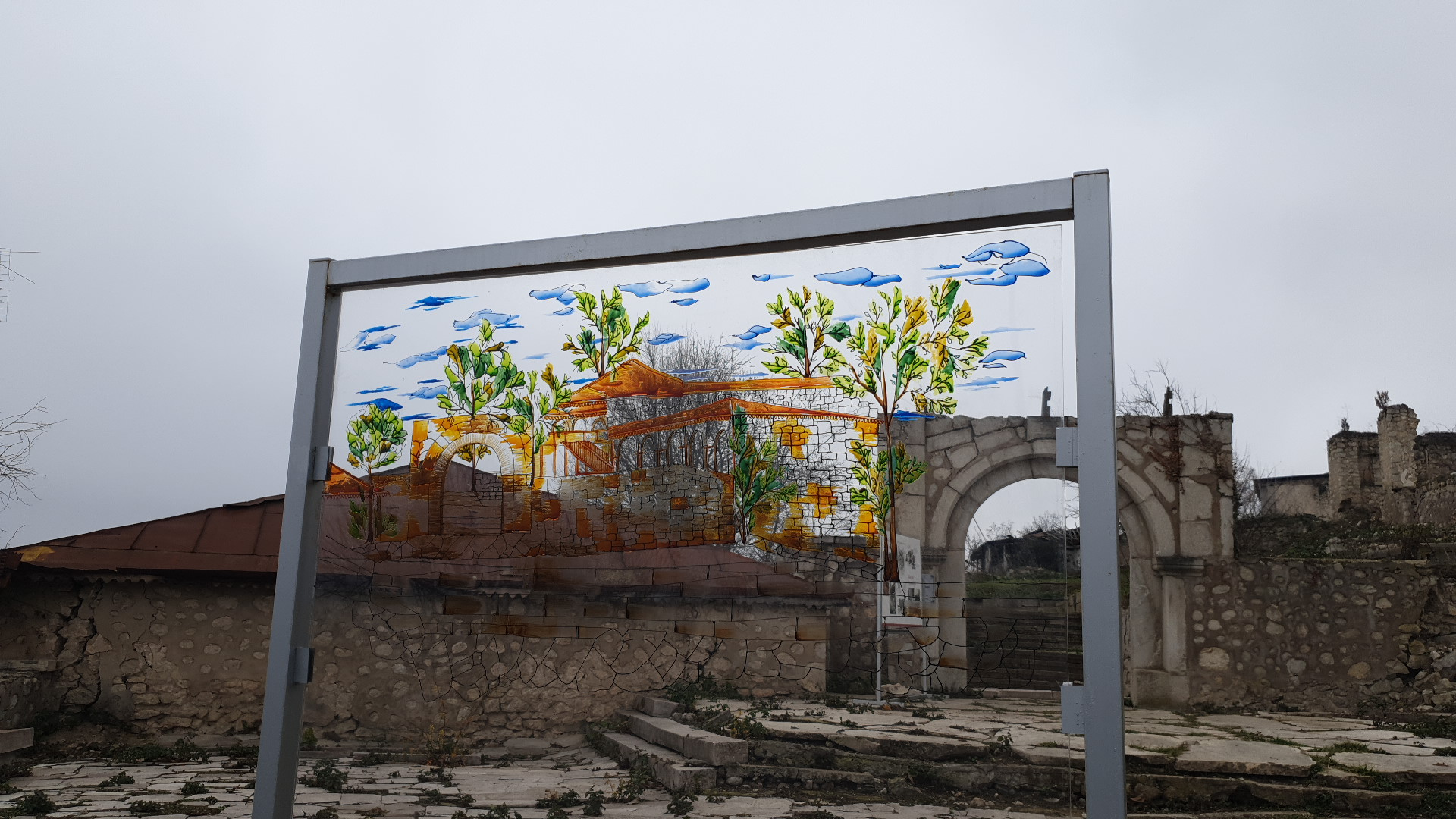

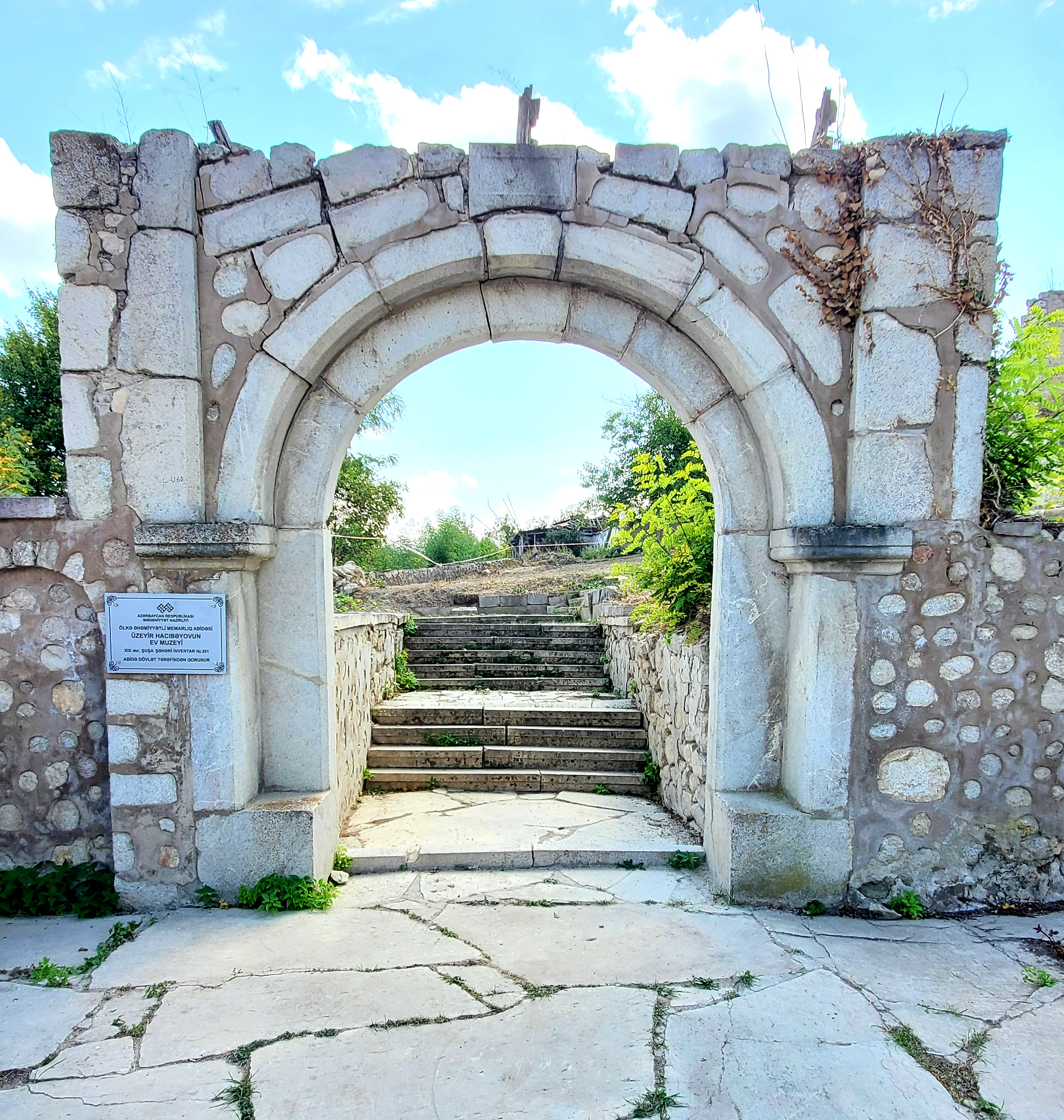

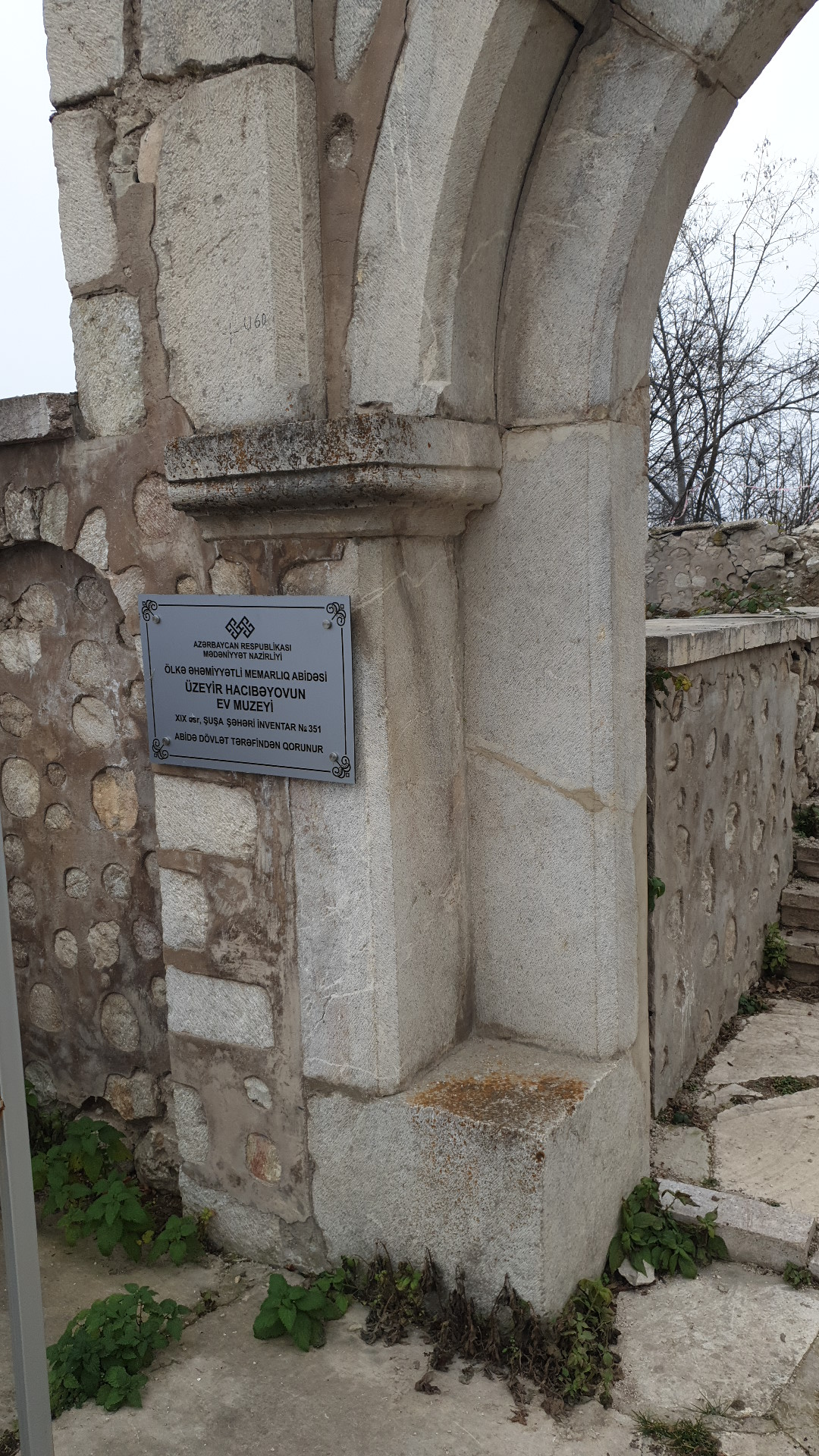

== See also ==
- Monuments of Shusha
- Uzeyir Hajibeyov's House Museum
