= Anthem of the Azerbaijan Soviet Socialist Republic =

- Former regional anthem of the Azerbaijan SSR Former national anthem of Azerbaijan (Note: Without lyrics.)
- Lyrics: Suleyman Rustam, Samad Vurgun, Huseyn Arif
- Music: Uzeyir Hajibeyov, 1944
- Adopted: 1945
- Readopted: 1991 (without words)
- Relinquished: 1991 (with lyrics); 1992 (music only)

Audio sample
- Azerbaijan SSR anthem (vocal): file; help

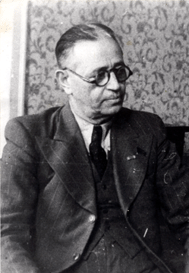
Uzeyir Hajibeyov, composer of the Azerbaijan SSR Anthem.

The State Anthem of the Azerbaijan Soviet Socialist Republic (Note: Azerbaijani: Азәрбајҹан Совет Сосиалист Республикасынын Һимни, romanized: Azərbaycan Sovet Sosialist Respublikasının Himni, IPA: [ʔɑːzæɾbɑjˈdʒɑn soˌvet sosiʔɑˈlist ɾesˈpublikɑsɯˌnɯn hɪmˈni]) was the anthem of Azerbaijan when it was a part of the former Soviet Union. It was created in 1944, and was used from 1945 to 1992 upon the nation's independence.

== History ==
In 1930, after 10 years of establishment of the Soviet republic (and while it was part of the within the Transcaucasian SFSR), Azerbaijani musicologist Uzeyir Hajibeyov wrote the lyrics and composed the music for the new anthem. Hajibeyov also conducted its first premiere in Baku on 28 April 1930; however, little to no information about the anthem's adoption as the State anthem was given.

A recording of the Brass Band of the Ministry of Defence of the USSR performing the Anthem of the Azerbaijani SSR.

It was composed by Uzeyir Hajibeyov, who also composed the current national anthem of Azerbaijan. Suleyman Rustam, Samad Vurgun and Huseyn Arif wrote the lyrics which were altered in 1978 to remove mentions of Joseph Stalin. Like many national anthems of the republics of the Soviet Union, this song praised Vladimir Lenin (and formerly Joseph Stalin as well), the October Revolution and Communism. It also praised the friendship of the republics of the Soviet Union. It was also the anthem of Azerbaijan when it gained independence until 1992 when the March of Azerbaijan was restored.

== Lyrics ==
The original lyrics were used between 1945 and 1978, and the post-Stalinist version was used from 1978 until the dissolution of the Soviet Union in late 1991.

=== Post-Stalinist version ===
Azerbaijani (Cyrillic)
(then official)

Азәрбајҹан! Чичәкләнән республика, шанлы дијар!
Гадир совет елләриндә һәм азадсан, һәм бәхтијар.
Октјабрдан гүввәт алыб сән говушдун сәадәтә,
Алгыш олсун бу һүнәрә, алгыш олсун бу гүдрәтә!

Нәгәрат:
Јолумуз Ленин јолудур, партијадыр рәһбәримиз,
Коммунизмин ҝүнәшилә нурланаҹаг сәһәримиз.
Биз ҝедирик ҝәләҹәјә галибләрин ҹәрҝәсиндә,
Јаша, јаша, Азәрбајҹан, бөјүк совет өлкәсиндә!

Одлар јурду, бу ағ ҝүнләр ел ҝүҹүнүн бәһрәсидир,
Гәһрәманлыг, бир дә һүнәр азад инсан һәвәсидир.
Нәсилләрдән-нәсилләрә јадиҝардыр дәјанәтин,
Коммунизмә биз ҝедирик, сыра мөһкәм, аддым мәтин.

Нәгәрат

Рәшадәтли рус халгыдыр достлуг, бирлик бајрагдары,
Мүгәддәсдир, сарсылмаздыр дост елләрин бу илгары.
Гардаш халглар бирлијиндән алдыг ҝүҹү, гүдрәти биз,
Гој вар олсун бу иттифаг – шанлы Совет Вәтәнимиз!

Нәгәрат

Modern orthography
(in use since 1992)

Azərbaycan! Çiçəklənən respublika, şanlı diyar!
Qadir sovet ellərində həm azadsan, həm bəxtiyar.
Oktyabrdan qüvvət alıb sən qovuşdun səadətə,
Alqış olsun bu hünərə, alqış olsun bu qüdrətə!

Nəqərat:
Yolumuz Lenin yoludur, partiyadır rəhbərimiz,
Kommunizmin günəşilə nurlanacaq səhərimiz.
Biz gedirik gələcəyə qaliblərin cərgəsində,
Yaşa, yaşa, Azərbaycan, böyük sovet ölkəsində!

Odlar yurdu, bu ağ günlər el gücünün bəhrəsidir,
Qəhrəmanlıq, bir də hünər azad insan həvəsidir.
Nəsillərdən-nəsillərə yadigardır dəyanətin,
Kommunizmə biz gedirik, sıra möhkəm, addım mətin.

Nəqərat

Rəşadətli rus xalqıdır dostluq, birlik bayraqdarı,
Müqəddəsdir, sarsılmazdır dost ellərin bu ilqarı.
Qardaş xalqlar birliyindən aldıq gücü, qüdrəti biz,
Qoy var olsun bu ittifaq – şanlı Sovet Vətənimiz!

Nəqərat

IPA transcription (Note: See Help:IPA/Azerbaijani and Azerbaijani phonology.)

[ʔɑ.zæɾ.bɑjˈdʒɑn | tʃi.tʃæc.læˈnæn | ɾesˈpub.li.kɑ ʃɑnˈɫɯ diˈjɑɾ |]
[gɑˈdɪɾ soˈvet | ʔel.læ.ɾɪnˈdæ | hæm ʔɑˈzɑt.sɑn hæm bæχ.tiˈjɑɾ ‖]
[ʔok.tjɑ.bɯɾˈdɑn | gyvˈvæt ʔɑˈɫɯp | sæn go.vuʃˈdʊn sæ.ʔɑ.dæˈtæ |]
[ɑɫˈgɯʃ ʔoɫˈsʊn bu hʏ.næˈɾæ | ʔɑɫˈgɯʃ ʔoɫˈsʊn bu gyd.ɾæˈtæ ‖]

[næ.gæˈɾɑt]
[jo.ɫʊˈmʊz ˈle.nɪn joˈɫu.dʊɾ | ˈpɑɾ.ti.jɑ.dɯɾ ɾæɦ.bæ.ɾɪˈmiz |]
[kom.mʊ.nizˈmɪn ɟy.næ.ʃɪˈlæ | nʊɾ.ɫɑ.nɑˈdʒɑχ ʃæ.hæ.ɾɪˈmiz ‖]
[biz ɟe.dɪˈɾiç ɟæ.læ.dʒæˈjæ | gɑ.lib.læˈɾɪn dʒæɾ.ɟæ.sɪnˈdæ |]
[jɑˈʃɑ jɑˈʃɑ ʔɑ.zæɾ.bɑjˈdʒɑn | bøˈjyç soˈvet ʔøʎ.cæ.sɪnˈdæ ‖]

[ʔodˈɫɑɾ jʊɾˈdu | bu ʔɑɣ ɟʏnˈlæɾ | ʔel ɟy.dʒʏˈnʏm bæɦ.ɾæˈsi.dɪɾ |]
[gæh.ɾæ.mɑnˈɫɯχ | bɪɾ dæ hʏˈnæɾ | ʔɑˈzɑt ʔɪnˈsɑn hæ.væˈsi.dɪɾ ǁ]
[næ.sɪl.læɾˈdæn | næ.sɪl.læˈɾæ | jɑ.diˈgɑɾ.dɯɾ dæ.jɑ.næˈtɪn |]
[kom.mʊ.nizˈmæ biz ɟe.dɪˈɾiç | sɯˈɾɑ møɦˈcæm | ʔɑdˈdɯm mæˈtɪn ‖]

[næ.gæˈɾɑt]

[ɾæ.ʃɑ.dætˈli | ɾus χɑɫˈgɯ.dɯɾ | dostˈɫuχ bɪɾˈliç bɑj.ɾɑg.dɑˈɾɯ |]
[my.gædˈdæz.dɪɾ | sɑɾ.sɯɫˈmɑz.dɯɾ | dost ʔel.læˈɾɪn bu ʔɪl.gɑˈɾɯ ‖]
[gɑɾˈdɑʃ χɑɫgˈɫɑɾ | bɪɾ.li.jɪnˈdæn | ʔɑɫˈdɯχ ɟyˈdʒy gyd.ɾæˈti biz |]
[goj vɑɾ ʔoɫˈsʊn bu ʔit.tiˈfɑχ | ʃɑnˈɫɯ soˈvet væ.tæ.nɪˈmiz ‖]

[næ.gæˈɾɑt]

English translation

Azerbaijan! A prosperous republic, a glorious land!
You are both free and happy in the mighty Soviet lands.
Having gained strength from October, you('ve) found happiness,
Kudos to this skill, kudos to this power!

Refrain:
Our way is the way of Lenin, the party is our leader,
Our morning will be illuminated by the sun of communism.
We are going to the future in the line of winners,
Live on, live on Azerbaijan, in the great Soviet country!

Hearth of fires, these white days are the fruit of manual strength,
Heroism and skill are free human desires.
Your steadfastness is a memory from generation to generation,
We move toward communism, the order is strong, the step is steady.

Refrain

The brave Russian folk are the flag bearers of friendship and unity,
This tradition of friendly hands is sacred and unbreakable.
We've got strength and power from the union of brotherly nations,
Long live this union – our glorious Soviet Motherland!

Refrain

=== Original version ===
Cyrillic script
(1939–58)

Азәрбайҹан – дүня ҝөрмүш бу шәрәфли, шанлы дияр,
Вәтән эшги бабалардан галмыш әзиз бир ядиҝар,
Ганлы дөйүш мейданында биз яратдыг ағ ҝүнләри –
Нәсилләрдән нәсилләрә юрдумузун шөһрәти вар.

Нәгәрат:
Гой вар олсун Азәрбайҹан, Одлар юрду – Ана вәтән
Гоҹа Шәргә ҝүнәш доғур юрдумузун гүдрәтиндән.
Байрағымыз сосиализмин гардаш элләр дүнясыдыр,
Яша вәтән! Халгымызын шәрәфисән, шөһрәтисән.

Устадымыз бөйүк Ленин – шанлы зәфәр байрағымыз,
Рәһбәримиз Сталиндир – бизим һәят нөврағымыз.
Ҝөзәл Бакы! Гүдрәтиндән илһам алыр Азәрбайҹан –
Азад элли, азад ҝүнлү доғма Совет торпағымыз.

Нәгәрат

Гардашымыз рус халгыдыр азадлығын байрагдары,
Ганымызла сувармышыг бу достлуғу, бу илгары,
Ер үзүнүн шөһрәтидир шанлы Совет торпағымыз –
Бу торпагда чичәк ачды инсанлығын илк баһары…

Нәгәрат

Cyrillic script
(after 1958)

Азәрбајҹан – дүнја ҝөрмүш бу шәрәфли, шанлы дијар,
Вәтән ешги бабалардан галмыш әзиз бир јадиҝар,
Ганлы дөјүш мејданында биз јаратдыг ағ ҝүнләри –
Нәсилләрдән нәсилләрә јурдумузун шөһрәти вар.

Нәгәрат:
Гој вар олсун Азәрбајҹан, Одлар јурду – Ана вәтән
Гоҹа Шәргә ҝүнәш доғур јурдумузун гүдрәтиндән.
Бајрағымыз сосиализмин гардаш елләр дүнјасыдыр,
Јаша вәтән! Халгымызын шәрәфисән, шөһрәтисән.

Устадымыз бөјүк Ленин – шанлы зәфәр бајрағымыз,
Рәһбәримиз Сталиндир – бизим һәјат нөврағымыз.
Ҝөзәл Бакы! Гүдрәтиндән илһам алыр Азәрбајҹан –
Азад елли, азад ҝүнлү доғма Совет торпағымыз.

Нәгәрат

Гардашымыз рус халгыдыр азадлығын бајрагдары,
Ганымызла сувармышыг бу достлуғу, бу илгары,
Јер үзүнүн шөһрәтидир шанлы Совет торпағымыз –
Бу торпагда чичәк ачды инсанлығын илк баһары…

Нәгәрат

Modern orthography

Azərbaycan – dünya görmüş bu şərəfli, şanlı diyar,
Vətən eşqi babalardan qalmış əziz bir yadigar,
Qanlı döyüş meydanında biz yaratdıq ağ günləri –
Nəsillərdən nəsillərə yurdumuzun şöhrəti var.

Nəqərat:
Qoy var olsun Azərbaycan, Odlar yurdu – Ana vətən
Qoca Şərqə günəş doğur yurdumuzun qüdrətindən.
Bayrağımız sosializmin qardaş ellər dünyasıdır,
Yaşa vətən! Xalqımızın şərəfisən, şöhrətisən.

Ustadımız böyük Lenin – şanlı zəfər bayrağımız,
Rəhbərimiz Stalindir – bizim həyat növrağımız.
Gözəl Bakı! Qüdrətindən ilham alır Azərbaycan –
Azad elli, azad günlü doğma Sovet torpağımız.

Nəqərat

Qardaşımız rus xalqıdır azadlığın bayraqdarı,
Qanımızla suvarmışıq bu dostluğu, bu ilqarı,
Yer üzünün şöhrətidir şanlı Sovet torpağımız –
Bu torpaqda çiçək açdı insanlığın ilk baharı…

Nəqərat

IPA transcription

[ʔɑ.zæɾ.bɑjˈdʒɑn | dʏnˈjɑ ɟøɾˈmyʃ | bu ʃæ.ɾæfˈli ʃɑnˈɫɯ diˈjɑɾ |]
[væˈtæn ʔeʃˈgi | bɑ.bɑ.ɫɑɾˈdɑn | gɑɫˈmɯʃ ʔæˈziz bɪɾ jɑ.diˈɟɑɾ |]
[gɑnˈɫɯ døˈjyʃ mej.dɑ.nɯnˈdɑ | biz jɑ.ɾɑtˈdɯχ ʔɑɣ ɟʏn.læˈɾi |]
[næ.sɪl.læɾˈdæn næ.sɪl.læˈɾæ | jʊɾ.dʊ.muˈzʊn ʃøɦ.ɾæˈti vɑɾ ‖]

[næ.gæˈɾɑt]
[goj vɑɾ ʔoɫˈsʊn ʔɑ.zæɾ.bɑjˈdʒɑn | ʔodˈɫɑɾ jʊɾˈdu ʔɑˈnɑ væˈtæn |]
[goˈdʒɑ ʃæɾˈgæ ɟʏˈnæʃ doˈɣʊɾ | jʊɾ.dʊ.muˈzʊn gyd.ɾæ.tɪnˈdæn ‖]
[bɑj.ɾɑ.ɣɯˈmɯz so.si.ʔɑ.lizˈmɪn | gɑɾˈdɑʃ ʔelˈlæɾ dʏn.jɑˈsɯ.dɯɾ |]
[jɑˈʃɑ væˈtæn χɑɫ.gɯ.mɯˈzɯn | ʃæ.ɾæ.fiˈsæn ʃøɦ.ɾæ.tiˈsæn ‖]

[ʔus.tɑ.dɯˈmɯz | bøˈjyç ˈle.nɪn | ʃɑnˈɫɯ zæˈfæɾ bɑj.ɾɑ.ɣɯˈmɯz |]
[ɾæɦ.bæ.ɾɪˈmiz | ʔɯsˈtɑ.lɪn.dɪɾ | biˈzɪm hæˈjɑt nøv.ɾɑ.ɣɯˈmɯz ‖]
[ɟøˈzæl bɑˈcɯ gyd.ɾæ.tɪnˈdæn | ʔɪlˈhɑm ʔɑˈɫɯɾ ʔɑ.zæɾ.bɑjˈdʒɑn |]
[ʔɑˈzɑt ʔelˈli ʔɑˈzɑt ɟʏnˈly | doɣˈmɑ soˈvet toɾ.pɑ.ɣɯˈmɯz ‖]

[næ.gæˈɾɑt]

[gɑɾ.dɑ.ʃɯˈmɯz | ɾus χɑɫˈgɯ.dɯɾ | ʔɑ.zɑd.ɫɯˈɣɯn bɑj.ɾɑg.dɑˈɾɯ |]
[gɑ.nɯ.mɯzˈɫɑ | su.vɑɾ.mɯˈʃɯχ | bu dost.luˈɣu bu ʔɪl.gɑˈɾɯ ‖]
[jeɾ ʔy.zʏˈnʏn ʃøɦ.ɾæˈti.dɪɾ | ʃɑnˈɫɯ soˈvet toɾ.pɑ.ɣɯˈmɯz |]
[bu toɾ.pɑgˈdɑ tʃiˈtʃæç ʔɑtʃˈdɯ | ʔɪn.sɑn.ɫɯˈɣɯn ʔɪʎç bɑ.hɑˈɾɯ ‖]

[næ.gæˈɾɑt]

English translation

Azerbaijan – this glorious, glorious land that the world has seen,
A dear relic of homeland's love left by our ancestors.
We('ve) created the white days on the bloody battlefield –
From generation to generation, our homeland has glory.

Refrain:
Long live Azerbaijan, the land of Fire – the Motherland,
The sun rises in the Ancient Orient from the power of our homeland.
Our flag is the world of fraternal nations of socialism,
Long live the homeland! You are the honour and glory of our people.

Our master, the great Lenin, is our glorious banner of victory,
Our leader, Stalin, is our beacon of life.
Beautiful Baku! Azerbaijan is inspired by his power –
Our native Soviet land of free land, free days.

Refrain

Our brother Russians are the standard-bearers of freedom,
We have watered this friendship, this longing with our blood.
Our glorious Soviet land is the glory of the earth –
The first spring of humanity has blossomed in this land…

Refrain

== See also ==
- AzSSR flag
- AzSSR emblem
