= State Anthem of the Republic of Azerbaijan =

Azərbaycan Respublikasının Dövlət himni
English: 'State Anthem of the Republic of Azerbaijan'
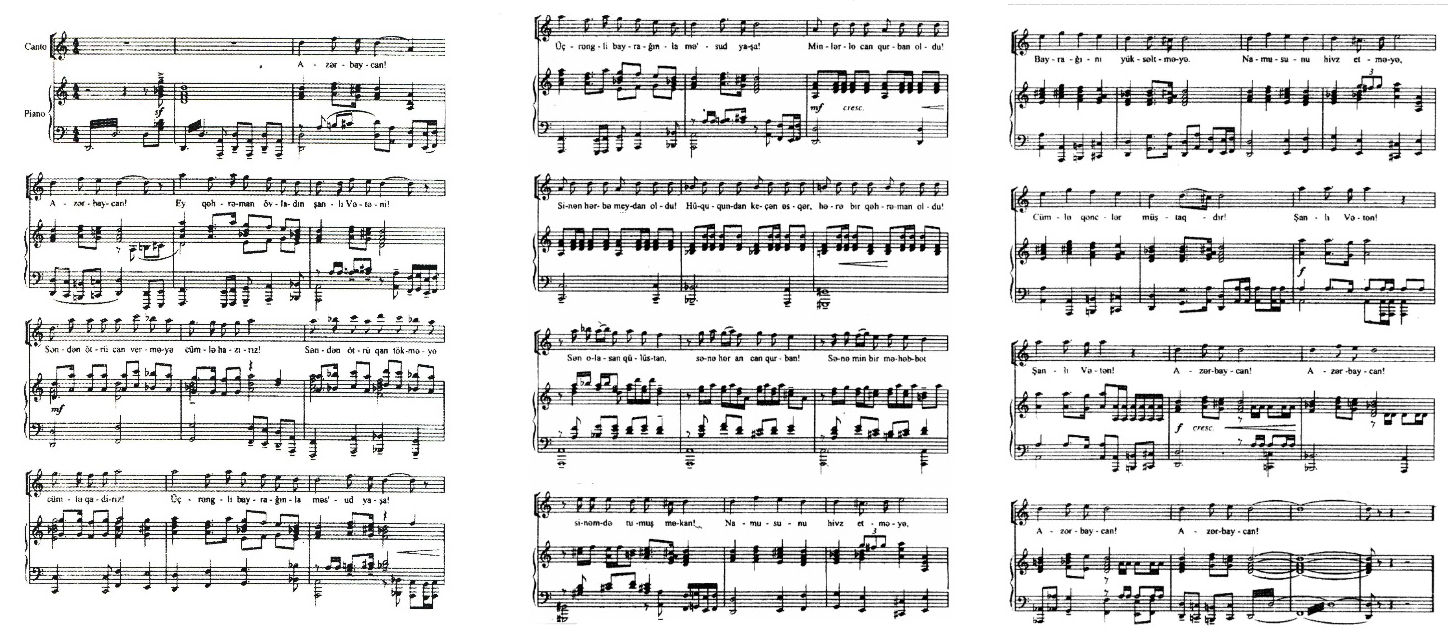
- Sheet music
- National anthem of Azerbaijan
- Also known as: "Azərbaycan marşı" (English: Azerbaijan March)
- Lyrics: Ahmad Javad or Jamo bey Jabrayilbeyli
- Music: Uzeyir Hajibeyov
- Adopted: 1919 (Azerbaijan Democratic Republic); 1992 (Republic of Azerbaijan)
- Relinquished: 1920
- Preceded by: Anthem of the Azerbaijan Soviet Socialist Republic

Audio sample
- U.S. Navy Band instrumental rendition in G minor: file; help

Old orchestral and choral vocal recording in D minor
From the website of the Presidency of Azerbaijan

2016 a cappella crowd vocal recording
A cappella performance of "Azərbaycan marşı" at an army support rally in Baku, April 2016

"Azərbaycan marşı", (Note: pronounced [ɑːzæɾbɑjˈdʒɑn mɑɾˈʃɯ]; lit. 'Azerbaijan March' or 'The March of Azerbaijan') officially the State Anthem of the Republic of Azerbaijan, (Note: Azerbaijani: Azərbaycan Respublikasının Dövlət himni) is the national anthem of Azerbaijan. The music was composed by Uzeyir Hajibeyov, a musicologist and prominent figure in Azerbaijani classical music. The lyrics, written in 1919, are largely attributed to poet Ahmad Javad; however, the lyrics have also been attributed to poet and educator Jamo bey Jabrayilbeyli. In 1992, after the fall of the Soviet Union, Azerbaijan's government officially adopted "Azərbaycan Marşı" as the national anthem.

The Azerbaijan government has also officially declared the national anthem to be "the sacred symbol of the Azerbaijan state, its independence and unity."

Since 2006, a fragment of the lyrics is depicted on the obverse of the 5 manat banknote. In 2011, to mark the 20th anniversary of independence, a stamp featuring the lyrics was issued.

== History ==
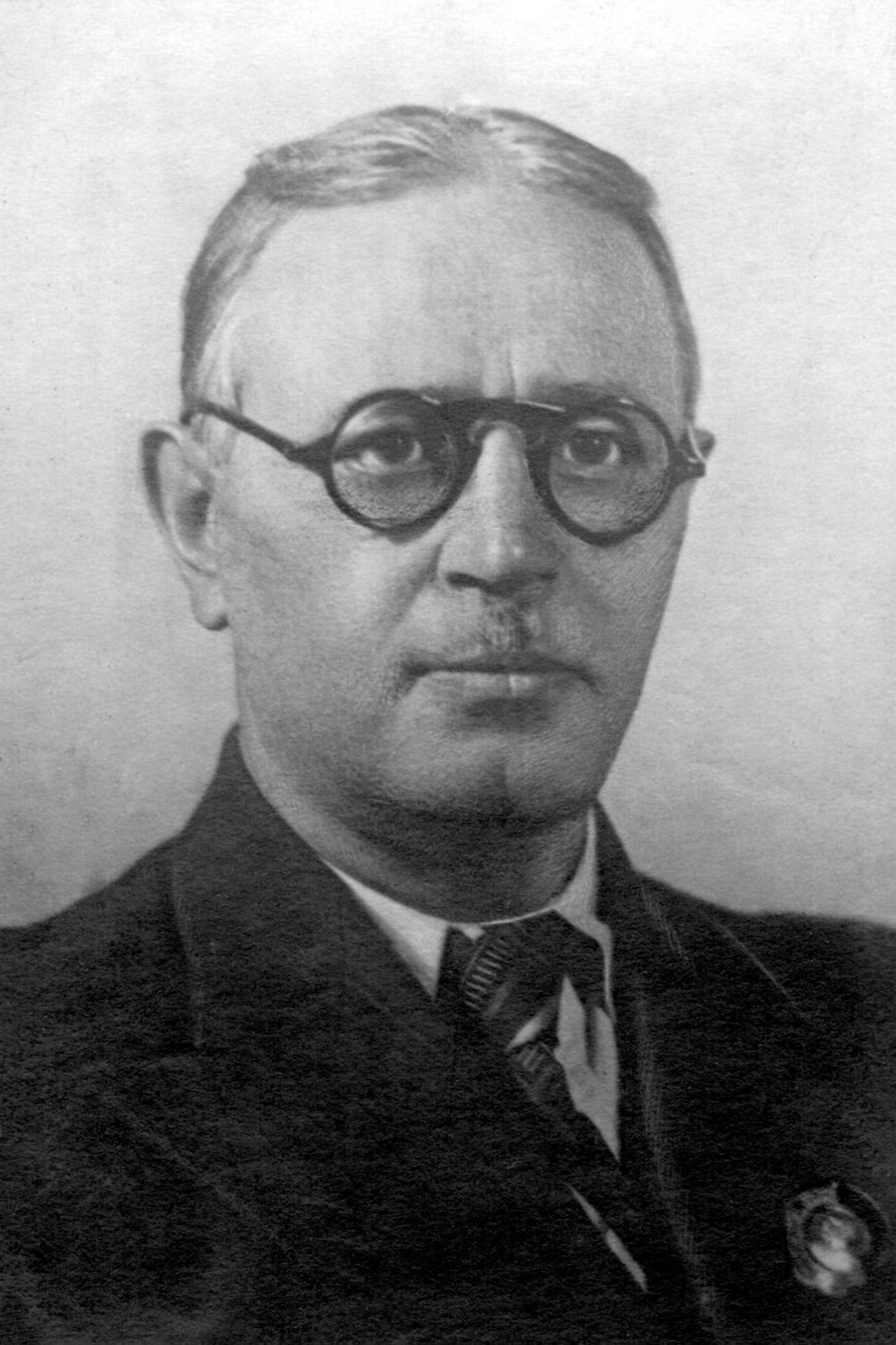
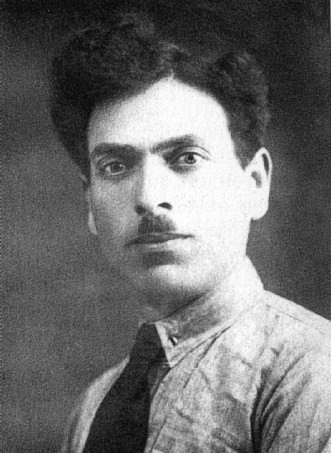
Composer Uzeyir Hajibeyov (left) and lyricist Ahmad Javad (right)

In 1919, during the formation of the Azerbaijan Democratic Republic, the new government announced it was accepting submissions from the public for a national anthem, coat of arms and state seal. A prize of 15,000 rubles would be awarded to the citizen who submitted the winning anthem.

Azerbaijani composer Uzeyir Hajibeyov wrote two marches. In 1919, this work received the first award announced by the government of the Azerbaijan Democratic Republic. The second march was the "March of Azerbaijan." According to Turkish musicologist Etem Üngör, "In those years, when Azerbaijan had not yet lost its independence, the march was chanted by military schools before lessons."

In 1922 the Azerbaijan SSR adopted the Soviet communist anthem "The Internationale". In 1944, during World War II, the new Soviet national anthem replaced "The Internationale" and an additional anthem of the Azerbaijan Soviet Socialist Republic was installed.

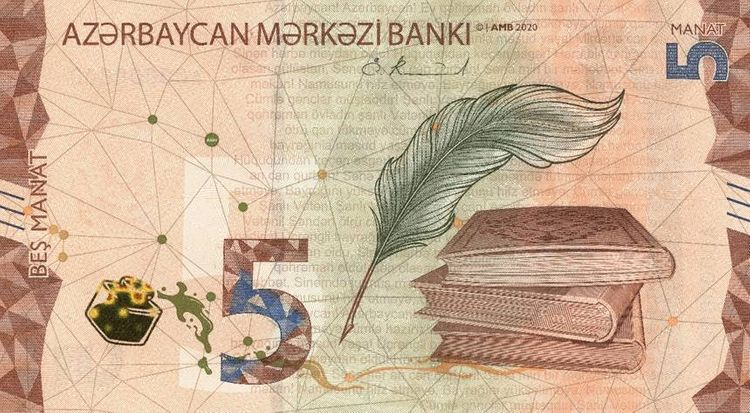
Obverse of the Azerbaijani 5 manat banknote with the lyrics of the national anthem

In 1989, following several years of changes brought by perestroika, composer Aydin Azimov arranged a modern recording of the anthem by a full symphony and chorus. That fall, "Azərbaycan marşı" was broadcast on television and radios in Azerbaijan, 70 years after it was introduced.

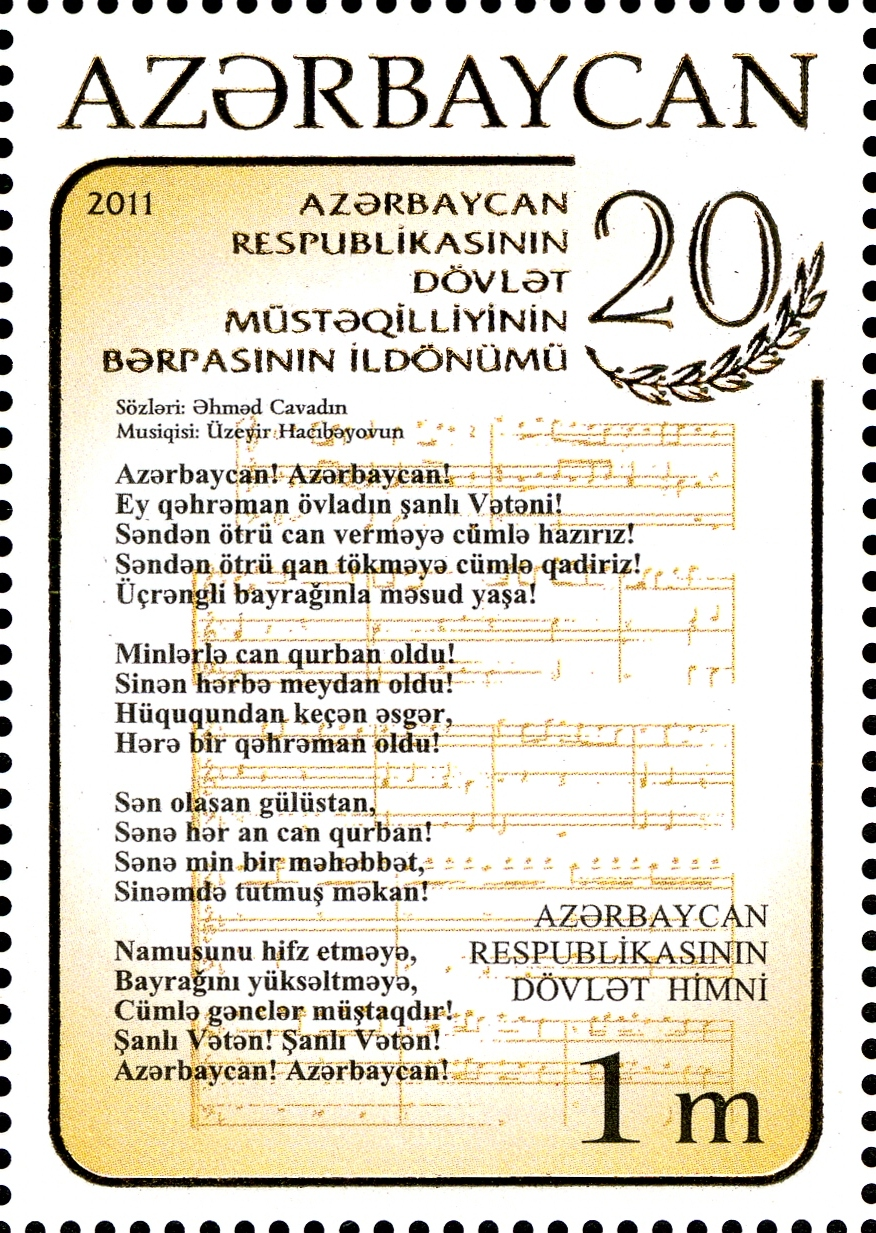
Azerbaijani postage stamp issued in 2011 with the lyrics of the national anthem

=== Post-Soviet restoration ===
After the dissolution of the Soviet Union, in spring 1992, the leaders of the independent Azerbaijani government proposed that the original anthem should be restored as the anthem of Azerbaijan. The Milli Mejlis (National Assembly) signed it into law on 27 May 1992.

== Lyrics ==
=== Official lyrics ===
The national anthem of Azerbaijan is usually performed in A, D, and G minor with the official lyrics given below.

Original lyrics of

State Anthem of the Republic of Azerbaijan

Latin script (Official, Baku Turkish)

Azərbaycan! Azərbaycan!
Ey qəhrəman övladın şanlı Vətəni!
Səndən ötrü can verməyə cümlə hazırız!
Səndən ötrü qan tökməyə cümlə qadiriz!
Üçrəngli bayrağınla məsud yaşa!
Üçrəngli bayrağınla məsud yaşa!

Minlərlə can qurban oldu,
Sinən hərbə meydan oldu!
Hüququndan keçən əsgər,
Hərə bir qəhrəman oldu!

Sən olasan gülüstan,
Sənə hər an can qurban!
Sənə min bir məhəbbət
Sinəmdə tutmuş məkan!

Namusunu hifz etməyə,
Bayrağını yüksəltməyə
Namusunu hifz etməyə,
Cümlə gənclər müştaqdır!

Şanlı Vətən! Şanlı Vətən!
Azərbaycan! Azərbaycan!
Azərbaycan! Azərbaycan!

Latin script (Istanbul Turkish)

Azerbaycan! Azerbaycan!
Ey kahraman evlâdın şanlı Vatanı!
Senden ötürü can vermeye cümle hazırız!
Senden ötürü kan dökməyə cümle kadiriz!
Üç renkli bayrağınla mesut yaşa!
Üç renkli bayrağınla mesut yaşa!

Binlerle can kurban oldu,
Sinen harbe meydan oldu!
Hukukundan geçen asker,
Heri bir kahraman oldu!

Sen olasın gülistan,
Sana her an can kurban!
Sana binbir muhabbet
Sinemde tutmuş mekân!

Namusunu hifzetmeye,
Bayrağını yükseltmeye,
Namusunu hifzetmeye,
Cümle gençler müştaktır!

Şanlı Vatan! Şanlı Vatan!
Azerbaycan! Azerbaycan!
Azerbaycan! Azerbaycan!

Arabic script (original)

آذربایجان! آذربایجان!
ای قهرمان اولادین شانلی وطنی
سندن اوترو جان ورمه‌یه جومله حاضریز
سندن اوتروقان توکمه‌یه جومله قادیریز
اوچ رنگلی بایراقین‌لا مسعود یاشا!
اوچ رنگلی بایراقین‌لا مسعود یاشا!

مینلرله جان قوربان اولدو
سینن حربه میدان اولدو!
حقوقوندان کچن عسکر
هره بیر قهرمان اولدو!

سن اولاسان گولوستان!
سنه هرآن جان قوربان!
سنه مین بیر محبت
سینه‌مده توتموش مکان!

ناموسونو حیفظ اتمه‌یه
بایراقینی یوکسلتمه‌یه
ناموسونو حیفظ اتمه‌یه
جومله گنجلر موشتاقدیر

شانلی وطن! شانلی وطن!
آذربایجان! آذربایجان!
آذربایجان! آذربایجان!

Cyrillic script (obsolete)

Азәрбајҹан! Азәрбајҹан!
Еј гәһрәман өвладын шанлы Вәтәни!
Сәндән өтрү ҹан вермәјә ҹүмлә һазырыз!
Сәндән өтрү ган төкмәјә ҹүмлә гадириз!
Үчрәнҝли бајрағынла мәсуд јаша!
Үчрәнҝли бајрағынла мәсуд јаша!

Минләрлә ҹан гурбан олду,
Синән һәрбә мејдан олду!
Һүгугундан кечән әсҝәр,
Һәрә бир гәһрәман олду!

Сән оласан ҝүлүстан,
Сәнә һәр ан ҹан гурбан!
Сәнә мин бир мәһәббәт
Синәмдә тутмуш мәкан!

Намусуну һифз етмәјә,
Бајрағыны јүксәлтмәјә
Намусуну һифз етмәјә,
Ҹүмлә ҝәнҹләр мүштагдыр!

Шанлы Вәтән! Шанлы Вәтән!
Азәрбајҹан! Азәрбајҹан!
Азәрбајҹан! Азәрбајҹан!

IPA transcription (Note: See Help:IPA/Azerbaijani and Azerbaijani phonology.)

[ɑː.zæɾ.bɑjˈdʒɑn | ɑː.zæɾ.bɑjˈdʒɑn ‖]
[ej gæɦ.ɾæˈmɑn øv.ɫɑˈdɯn ʃɑnˈɫɯ væ.tæˈni ‖]
[sænˈdæn øtˈɾy dʒɑn veɾ.mæˈjæ ˈdʒʏm.læ hɑˈzɯ.ɾɯz ‖]
[sænˈdæn øtˈɾy gɑn tøc.mæˈjæ ˈdʒʏm.læ gɑˈdɪ.ɾiz ‖]
[ytʃ.ɾæɲɟˈli bɑj.ɾɑ.ɣɯnˈɫɑ mæˈsud̥ jɑˈʃɑ ‖]
[ytʃ.ɾæɲɟˈli bɑj.ɾɑ.ɣɯnˈɫɑ mæˈsud̥ jɑˈʃɑ ‖]

[mɪn.læɾˈlæ dʒɑn gʊɾˈbɑn oɫˈdu |]
[sɪˈnæn hæɾˈbæ mejˈdɑn oɫˈdu ‖]
[hy.guː.gʊnˈdɑn ceˈtʃæn æsˈɟæɾ |]
[hæˈɾæ bɪɾ gæɦ.ɾæˈmɑn oɫˈdu ‖]

[sæn oˈɫɑ.sɑn ɟʏ.lysˈtɑn |]
[sæˈnæ hæɾ ɑn dʒɑn gʊɾˈbɑn ‖]
[sæˈnæ mɪm‿bɪɾ mæ.hæbˈbæt]
[sɪ.næmˈdæ tutˈmuʃ mæˈcɑn ‖]

[nɑː.mu.sʊˈnu hifz et.mæˈjæ |]
[bɑj.ɾɑ.ɣɯˈnɯ jyc.sælt.mæˈjæ]
[nɑː.mu.sʊˈnu hifz et.mæˈjæ |]
[ˈdʒʏm.læ ɟændʒˈlæɾ myʃˈtɑg.dɯɾ ‖]

[ʃɑnˈɫɯ væˈtæn | ʃɑnˈɫɯ væˈtæn ‖]
[ɑː.zæɾ.bɑjˈdʒɑn | ɑː.zæɾ.bɑjˈdʒɑn ‖]
[ɑː.zæɾ.bɑjˈdʒɑn | ɑː.zæɾ.bɑjˈdʒɑn ‖]

English translation

Azerbaijan! Azerbaijan!
O triumphant homeland of children of heroes!
We are all ready to bestow our lives on you!
We are fain to shed our very own blood for you!
May you live in bliss with your three-coloured flag!
May you live in bliss with your three-coloured flag!

Thousands of lives were sacrificed,
Your soul a battlefield became,
Of every soldier devoted,
Each one of them heroes became!

Blossom like a rose garden,
My life ever sworn to you,
A thousand one loves for you,
Rooted deeply in my heart!

To stand on guard for your honour,
Bearing aloft your sacred flag;
To stand on guard for your honour,
Eager be every youthful heir!

Glorious homeland! Glorious homeland!
Azerbaijan! Azerbaijan!
Azerbaijan! Azerbaijan!

=== In other scripts ===
Latin script
(pre-1992 orthography)

Azärbaycan! Azärbaycan!
Ey qähräman övladın şanlı Vätäni!
Sändän ötrü can vermäyä cümlä hazırız!
Sändän ötrü qan tökmäyä cümlä qadiriz!
Üçrängli bayrağınla mäsud yaşa!
Üçrängli bayrağınla mäsud yaşa!

Minlärlä can qurban oldu,
Sinän härbä meydan oldu!
Hüququndan keçän äsgär,
Härä bir qähräman oldu!

Sän olasan gülüstan,
Sänä här an can qurban!
Sänä min bir mähäbbät
Sinämdä tutmuş mäkan!

Namusunu hifz etmäyä,
Bayrağını yüksältmäyä
Namusunu hifz etmäyä,
Cümlä gänclär müştaqdır!

Şanlı Vätän! Şanlı Vätän!
Azärbaycan! Azärbaycan!
Azärbaycan! Azärbaycan!

Latin script
(Yañalif)

Azərʙajçan! Azərʙajçan!
Ej qəhrəman ɵvladьn şanlь Vətəni!
Səndən ɵtry çan verməjə çymlə hazьrьz!
Səndən ɵtry qan tɵkməjə çymlə qadiriz!
Ycrəngli ʙajraƣьnla məsud jaşa!
Ycrəngli ʙajraƣьnla məsud jaşa!

Minlərlə çan qurʙan oldu,
Sinən hərʙə mejdan oldu!
Hyququndan kecən əsgər,
Hərə ʙir qəhrəman oldu!

Sən olasan gylystan,
Sənə hər an çan qurʙan!
Sənə min ʙir məhəʙʙət
Sinəmdə tutmuş məkan!

Namusunu hifz etməjə,
Bajraƣьnь jyksəltməjə
Namusunu hifz etməjə,
Çymlə gənçlər myştaqdьr!

Şanlь Vətən! Şanlь Vətən!
Azərʙajçan! Azərʙajçan!
Azərʙajçan! Azərʙajçan!

Cyrillic script
(pre-1939 orthography)

Азәрбайҹан! Азәрбайҹан!
Эй гәһрәман өвладын шанлы Вәтәни!
Сәндән өтрү ҹан вермәйә ҹүмлә һазырыз!
Сәндән өтрү ган төкмәйә ҹүмлә гадириз!
Үчрәнҝли байрағынла мәсуд яша!
Үчрәнҝли байрағынла мәсуд яша!

Минләрлә ҹан гурбан олду,
Синән һәрбә мейдан олду!
Һүгугундан кечән әсҝәр,
Һәрә бир гәһрәман олду!

Сән оласан ҝүлүстан,
Сәнә һәр ан ҹан гурбан!
Сәнә мин бир мәһәббәт
Синәмдә тутмуш мәкан!

Намусуну һифз этмәйә,
Байрағыны йүксәлтмәйә
Намусуну һифз этмәйә,
Ҹүмлә ҝәнҹләр мүштагдыр!

Шанлы Вәтән! Шанлы Вәтән!
Азәрбайҹан! Азәрбайҹан!
Азәрбайҹан! Азәрбайҹан!

Georgian script
(rarely used in Georgia)

აზა̈რბაჲჯან! აზა̈რბაჲჯან!
ჱ ყა̈ჰრა̈მა̈ნ ო̈ვლადჷნ შანლჷ ვა̈თა̈ნი!
სა̈ნდა̈ნ ო̈თრუ̈ ჯან ვერმა̈ჲა̈ ჯუ̈მლა̈ ჰაზჷრჷზ!
სა̈ნდა̈ნ ო̈თრუ̈ ყან თო̈ქმა̈ჲა̈ ჯუ̈მლა̈ ყადირიზ!
უ̈ჩრა̈ნგლი ბაჲრაღჷნლა მა̈სუდ ჲაშა!
უ̈ჩრა̈ნგლი ბაჲრაღჷნლა მა̈სუდ ჲაშა!

მინლა̈რლა̈ ჯან ყურბან ოლდუ,
სინა̈ნ ჰა̈რბა̈ მჱდან ოლდუ!
ჰუ̈ყუყუნდან ქეჩა̈ნ ა̈სგა̈რ,
ჰა̈რა̈ ბირ ყა̈ჰრა̈მა̈ნ ოლდუ!

სა̈ნ ოლასან გუ̈ლუ̈სთან,
სა̈ნა̈ ჰა̈რ ან ჯან ყურბან!
სა̈ნა̈ მინ ბირ მა̈ჰა̈ბბა̈თ
სინა̈მდა̈ თუთმუშ მა̈ქან!

ნამუსუნუ ჰიჶზ ეთმა̈ჲა̈,
ბაჲრაღჷნჷ ჲუ̈ქსა̈ლთმა̈ჲა̈
ნამუსუნუ ჰიჶზ ეთმა̈ჲა̈,
ჯუ̈მლა̈ გა̈ნჯლა̈რ მუ̈შთაყდჷრ!

შანლჷ ვა̈თა̈ნ! შანლჷ ვა̈თა̈ნ!
აზა̈რბაჲჯან! აზა̈რბაჲჯან!
აზა̈რბაჲჯან! აზა̈რბაჲჯან!

== Regulations ==
Regulations for the performance of the national anthem are set forth in the law signed by President Heydar Aliyev in 1996. While a performance of the anthem may include only music, only words, or a combination of both, the anthem must be performed using the official music and words prescribed by law. Once a performance has been recorded, it may be used for any purpose, such as in a radio or television broadcast.

== Musical adaptations ==
In 2012, Philip Sheppard with the London Philharmonic Orchestra recorded the anthem alongside other national anthems of the world participating for the 2012 Summer Olympics and the 2012 Summer Paralympics.
