= Ahmad Javad =

Azerbaijani poet

- Əhməd Cavad
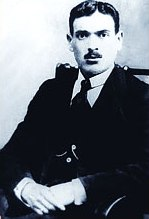
- Born: May 5, 1892; Aşağı Seyfəli, Shamkir Rayon, Russian Empire
- Died: October 13, 1937 (aged 45); Baku, Azerbaijan SSR, USSR
- Citizenship: Russian Empire, Azerbaijan Democratic Republic, Soviet Union
- Occupation: Poet

Ahmad Javad (Azerbaijani: Əhməd Məhəmmədəli oğlu Cavad; May 5, 1892 – October 13, 1937) was an Azerbaijani poet who is best known for writing the words of the National Anthem of Azerbaijan used under the 1918–1920 Democratic Republic of Azerbaijan, and again since 1991, and another poem named Chirpynirdi gara deniz. He was later arrested by the Soviet regime and executed on October 13, 1937, accused of trying to spread Musavat-inspired nationalism to young Azerbaijani poets.

== Biography ==
Ahmad Javad Akhundzade was born on May 5, 1892, in the village Aşağı Seyfəli of Elizavetpol uezd, Russian Empire. His father died when he was a youth, in either 1897 or 1898. He received his primary education at home, learning Turkish, Persian, Arabic and Eastern literature. In 1912, after graduating from a religious seminary in Ganja, he worked as a teacher.

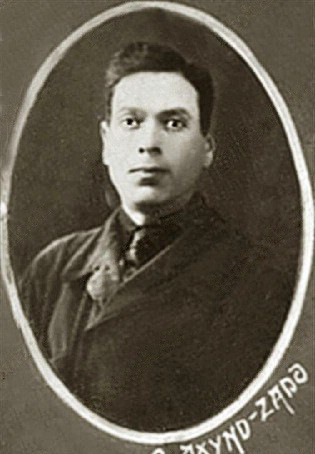
Ahmad Javad as a youth

During the First Balkan War, he fought on the Ottoman side in a detachment of volunteers from the Caucasus.

He published the poetry books "Goshma" (1916) and "Dalga" (1919). In 1918, at the suggestion of Mammed Amin Rasulzade, he joined the Musavat Party and from 1920 to 1923 was a member of its Central Committee, for which he was arrested in 1923 and later freed. Javad wrote about the declaration of the ADR in "Azerbaijan, Azerbaijan!" and about the Azerbaijani flag in "To Azerbaijan's flag". Under the ADR he continued teaching and helped establish Azerbaijan University. In the poem "O, soldier!" he glorified the Turkish Army, which fought on the Azerbaijani side in 1918. After the establishment of Soviet authority Javad continued teaching. In 1920, he worked as the headmaster and a teacher of Russian and Azerbaijani in the village of Khulug in Gusar rayon, but from 1920 to 1922 he was a public education branch manager in Quba rayon.

In 1922–1927 he studied in the history and philology department of Azerbaijan's Pedagogic Institute, and simultaneously taught at the technical school named after Nariman Narimanov.

In 1924–1926 he worked as the senior secretary of the Union of Soviet Writers of Azerbaijan. In 1925 Javad was arrested for the poem "Goygol".

In 1930 he moved to Ganja. From 1930 to 1933 he was a teacher, then the associate professor and the head of a chair of Russian and Azerbaijani languages of Ganja Agricultural Institute. In 1933 he received the title of professor. Afterwards he headed a literary department of Ganja Drama Theater.

In 1934, Javad returned to Baku, worked as an editor of translation department of the "Azernashr" Publishing House. In 1935–1936, he headed the department of documentary films at the "Azerbaijanfilm" film studio.

== Arrest and death ==
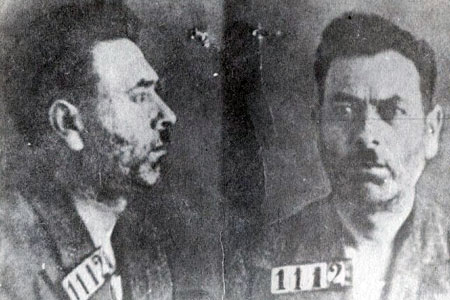
The last photo taken of Ahmad Javad

Javad was a leader of the Musavat Literature Union called Yashil Galamlar (Green Pens). Javad was one of many Azerbaijani artists and writers imprisoned and killed by the Soviet regime for ideas that it considered dangerous.

There is a photo of prisoner Ahmad Javad, number 1112. The last sentence reads: "The death sentence of Ahmad Javad was executed on October 13, 1937, in Baku". His family was exiled.

The documents charged that in addition to being a member of the Musavat Party, Ahmad Javad was a friend of M.A.Rasulzade, the founder of Azerbaijan Democratic Republic, as well as the poets Mushfig and Javid.

His wife Shukriya Khanum was separated from her children and sentenced to eight years in a Siberian Labor camp.

In December 1955, Javad was rehabilitated. His works include "Poems" (1958) and "Don't cry, I will do" (1991). In March 1937 he was awarded the first prize for his translation of Shota Rustaveli's "The Knight in Tiger Skin" into Azerbaijani. Other works he translated into Azerbaijani include: Pushkin's "Copper Rider", Gorky's Childhood, Turgenev's prose, Shakespeare's Othello, Rabelais's Gargantua and Pantagruel, Knut Hamsun's Hunger.
