= Yuxarı Seyfəli =

Village in Shamkir Rayon, Azerbaijan

Coordinates: 40°45′N 46°06′E

Yuxarı Seyfəli is a village and municipality in the Shamkir Rayon of Azerbaijan. It has a population of 3,632.
