= Seyf Ali Kandi =

Seyf Ali Kandi سيف علي كندي
- Village
- Location within Iran
- Coordinates: 36°17′27″N 47°38′53″E
- Country: Iran
- Province: Kurdistan
- County: Bijar
- Bakhsh: Korani
- Rural District: Korani

Population (2006)
  - Total: 225
- Time zone: UTC+3:30 (IRST)
  - Summer (DST): UTC+4:30 (IRDT)

Seyf Ali Kandi (Persian: سيف علي كندي, also Romanized as Seyf ‘Alī Kandī and Seyf‘alī Kandī) is a village in Korani Rural District, Korani District, Bijar County, Kurdistan Province, Iran. At the 2006 census, its population was 225, in 53 families. The village is populated by Azerbaijanis.
