= Uzeyir Hajibeyov's House Museum =

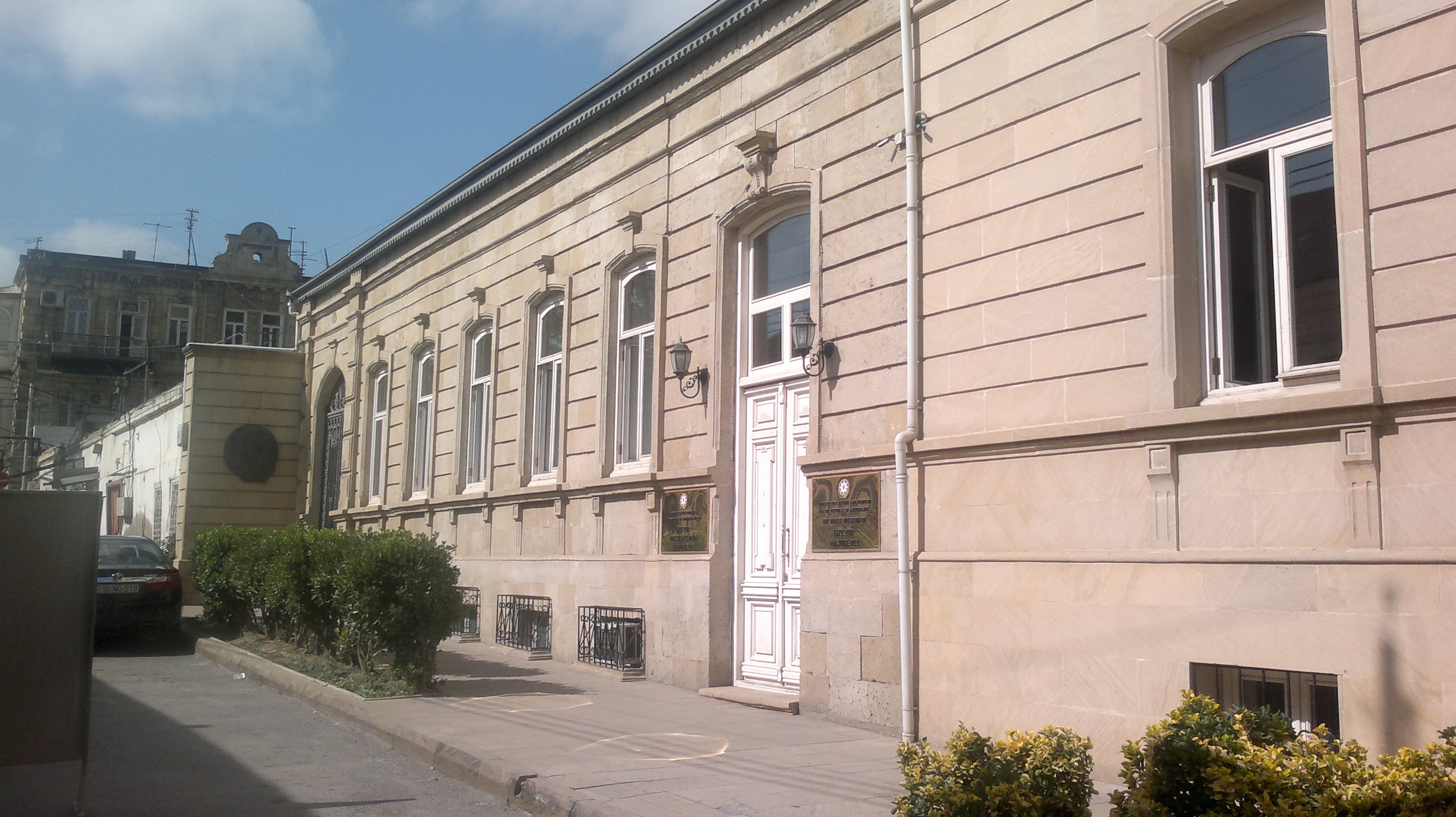
- Established: 20 November 1975
- Location: Shamil Azizbekhov 67/69, Yasamal, Baku, Azerbaijan
- Coordinates: 40°22′39″N 49°49′48″E
- Director: Sardar Farajov

Uzeyir Hajibeyov's House Museum is the house in which the famous Azerbaijani composer Uzeyir Hajibeyov lived, located on Shamil Azizbekov Street near the Nizami metro station. The museum was created to perpetuate and propagate the life and work of composer Uzeyir Hajibeyov. The Memorial Museum is under the control of the Ministry of Culture and Tourism of the Republic of Azerbaijan.

== History ==
The museum was created in 1975 on the initiative of the first secretary of the Central Committee of the Communist Party of the Azerbaijan SSR Heydar Aliyev. The composer lived in this house from 1915 to 1942. The museum consists of 4 rooms, a glass-lounge, a cinema hall, an exhibition hall and an administrative unit. People's artist of Azerbaijan Kazim Kazimzade and architect Eduard Kruiki greatly contributed to the design and preparation of the museum. On February 28, 2005, in honor of the 120th anniversary of Uzeyir Hajibeyov, President Ilham Aliyev signed an order to carry out major repairs in the museum house.

From the memoirs of director and the People's Artist of the USSR I. Sharoyev:

With Uzeyir Hajibeyov, my father was friends, and our family often went to the Hajibeyovs' house in the evenings. They then lived in an alley near Shemakha Street, in a one-story stone house. There were no trees in the courtyard - there were large tubs of flowers on the asphalt courtyard. A large glass veranda overlooked the courtyard. When we came to Gadzhibekov, the whole evening was always distributed according to the same order. At first, they drank tea in the dining room with incredibly delicious Azerbaijani sweets, which inimitably prepared the spouse Hajibeyov, Melikia-Khanum. Then his father retired from Gadzhibekov to the office, where they sat for hours...

== Expositions ==
The expositions in the museum show the composer's life and creativity, as well as personal things of the composer. Everything in this house is kept as it was in Uzeyir bey's time. A dining table with silver dishes, samovar, copper bowls, gramophone, radio receiver, gifts from his friends, etc. Together with Uzeyir Hajibeyov's desk, all the items on the table are kept. All the items belonging to him on the table—his watch, glasses, even the unfinished part of the symphonic poem "Azerbaijan" are still on his desk. The exposition tells about the musical scenes of Hajibeyov from the first opera in the entire Middle East "Leyli and Majnun", up to the classic "Koroghlu". The museum has done a great job for 40 years, the exposition has been updated several times, and the fund is enriched annually.

== See also ==
- House-Museum of Uzeyir Hajibeyov (Shusha)
