= Azerin =

Azerbaijani singer and senior lieutenant (born 1971)

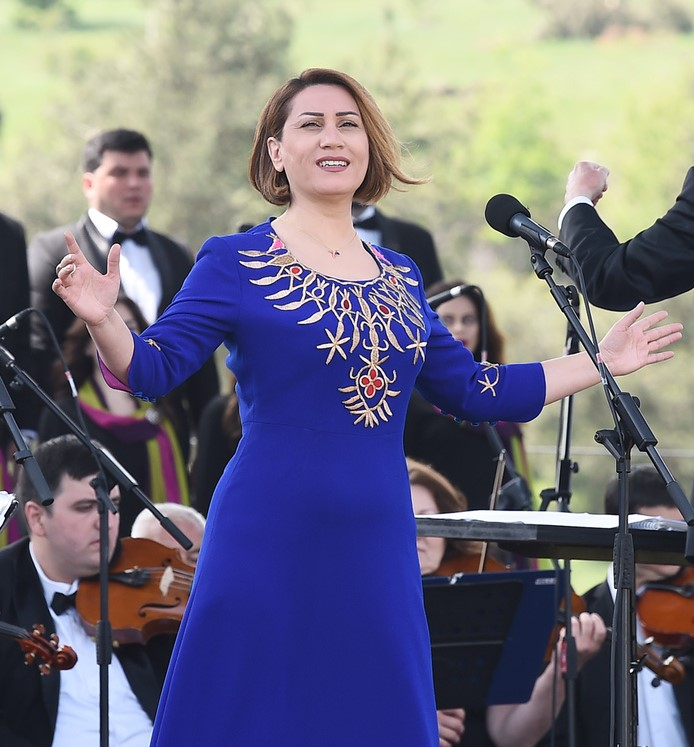
- Azerin at the Kharibulbul Festival 2021 in Shusha

Background information
- Born: Anaxanım Etibar qızı Tağıyeva; 9 May 1971 (age 54); Baku, Azerbaijan
- Origin: Baku
- Occupations: Singer; senior lieutenant
- Years active: 1980–present
- Musical career
- Genres: Pop, folk
- Instruments: vocals
- Label: Nüvaz Müzik
- Website: azerin.az

Azerin (Azerbaijani: Azərin) (born 9 May 1971) is an Azerbaijani singer and senior lieutenant.

== Career ==
Five-year-old Azerin became the soloist of the Azerbaijan State Television and Radio. In 1990, Azerin won an award in the Baki payizi-90 (Baku Autumn-90) music contest, and then in 2001, she won an award in "The voice of Asia" music contest, in Republic of Kazakhstan. She has performed in the United States, South Korea, Belarus, Kazakhstan, Georgia, the Netherlands, Belgium, Italy, Israel, Lithuania, Latvia, China, Denmark, the United Kingdom, (Germany), Austria, Sweden, Russia, and Turkey. She has also hosted several successful TV shows. In 2006, she was awarded the title of Honored Artist of the Azerbaijan Republic, and in 2015, was designated People's Artist of the Azerbaijan Republic.

== Discography ==
=== Albums ===
- "Azerin 1" 2001
- "Çırpınırdın Karadeniz" 2003
- "Azerin 2" 2006
- "Yüreklerde biriz" 2015
