= Dağlar qızı Reyhan =

Song by Rashid Behbudov
- Language: Azerbaijani
- English title: Daughter of the Mountains – Reyhan
- Published: 1960
- Composer(s): Fikret Amirov

"Daughter of the Mountains – Reyhan" (Azerbaijani: Dağlar qızı Reyhan) is an Azerbaijani folk song.

== History ==
According to the legend, the song sings about Reyhan, who defeated the Dashnaks in Gəlinqaya in Quba. During the March 1918 genocide, the Dashnaks attack an Azerbaijani wedding and kill the groom; the bride runs and hides in the mountains. Later, having gathered a detachment, the bride named Reyhan defeats the Dashnaks. In 1928, she was arrested, however she escaped. Then she lived her life in a monastery under a false name.

== Performance ==
In 1959, Fikret Amirov composed the music for the poem "Daughter of the Mountains – Reyhan". According to one version, the words of the song belong to the poet Talat Eyyubov. In 1960, the song was firstly performed by the People's Artist of the USSR Rashid Behbudov, but the most famous performance belongs to the People's Artist Zeynab Khanlarova.

Fragments of the song "Daughter of the mountains – Reyhan" are heard at the Baku metro at the Inshaatchilar station.
