= Aşağı Seyfəli =

- Municipality
- Location within Azerbaijan
- Coordinates: 40°45′23″N 46°06′51″E
- Country: Azerbaijan
- Rayon: Shamkir

Population
  - Total: 6,202
- Time zone: UTC+4 (AZT)
  - Summer (DST): UTC+5 (AZT)

Aşağı Seyfəli (also, Ashagy Seyfali, Ashagy-Shikhly, Seyfaly, and Seyfeli) is a village and municipality in the Shamkir Rayon of Azerbaijan. It has a population of 6,202.
