= Monument to Nizami Ganjavi =

- Monument to Nizami Ganjavi in Baku
- Monument to Nizami Ganjavi in Ganja
- Monument to Nizami Ganjavi in Beijing
- Monument to Nizami Ganjavi in Chișinău
- Monument to Nizami Ganjavi in Rome
- Monument to Nizami Ganjavi in Saint Petersburg
- Monument to Nizami Ganjavi in Tashkent
