= Statue of Fuzuli (Baku) =

- Məhəmməd Füzulinin heykəli (Azerbaijani)
- Interactive map of Statue of Fuzuli
- Type: Statue
- Location: Fuzuli Square, Baku

History
- Founded: 20th century
- Built: 1958–1962
- Built for: Fuzuli

Site notes
- Height: 12 metres (39 ft)
- Architect: Haji Mukhtarov
- Sculptor: Tokay Mammadov and Omar Eldarov
- Governing body: Government of Azerbaijan
- Website: http://mct.gov.az/en

A statue of the 16th-century Azerbaijani poet, writer, and thinker Fuzuli forms a major monument in the city of Baku. The statue was prepared by Azerbaijani sculptors Tokay Mammadov and Omar Eldarov between 1958 and 1963. The architect of the statue is Haji Mukhtarov.

For this work, sculptors Tokay Mammadov and Omar Eldarov were awarded silver medals by the USSR Academy of Arts.

== History ==
In 1958, a competition for the establishment of a statue to Azerbaijani poet Fuzuli was proclaimed on the occasion of the 400th anniversary of his death. The project was jointly prepared by Tokay Mammadov and Omar Eldarov, who studied together at the Repin Academy of Arts in St. Petersburg, and who together with architect Haji Mukhtarov won the competition.

Before working on the statue of Fuzuli, both Mammadov and Eldarov created other poetry-related works. Mammadov worked on the portrait of Nizami Ganjavi in those years. The portrait, the first wooden portrait in Azerbaijani sculpture, is kept in the Nizami Museum of Azerbaijani Literature.

Eldarov created the marble portrait of the 19th-century Azerbaijani poet and daughter of the khan of Karabagh Khurshidbanu Natavan in the 1950s. Soon he was ordered to create the bronze statue of Natavan by the Chairman of the Presidium of the Supreme Soviet, the People's Writer of Azerbaijan, Mirza Ibrahimov.

The unveiling of the statue took place in 1962.

== Description ==
The statue of Fuzuli consists of a bronze part on the granite pedestal and a fountain located in front of it.

The height of the sculpture is 12 m (39 ft). The lines on the poet's face, frown on his forehead, and between his eyebrows describes his life with intense thoughts and excitement.

For the first time, Fuzuli's artistic image was created by Azerbaijani sculptor Fuad Abdurahmanov. Thus, when the facade of the building of the Nizami Museum of Azerbaijani Literature was being developed, one of the facade's decorations was intended to be a statue of Fuzuli. Abdurrahmanov's project won the competition for the statue of the poet.

The image of Fuzuli, created by Abdurahmanov for the museum's construction in 1939, was officially recognized as a portrait of the poet. While preparing the statue, the sculptors were loyal to the general image created by Abdurrahmanov.

== See also ==
- Monument to Nizami Ganjavi in Baku
