= Monument to Nizami Ganjavi in Ganja =

Monument in Ganja, Azerbaijan

Monument to Nizami Ganjavi
- Interactive map of Monument to Nizami Ganjavi
- Location: Ganja, Azerbaijan
- Type: Monument
- Completion date: 1946
- Dedicated to: Nizami Ganjavi

The monument to Nizami Ganjavi (Azerbaijani: Nizami Gəncəvinin heykəli) is a monument to the outstanding Persian poet Nizami Ganjavi, located in the hometown of the poet, Ganja, Azerbaijan. The monument was erected in 1946.

The sculptor of the monument is People's Artist of Azerbaijan Fuad Abdurahmanov, the architects are Sadig Dadashov and Mikayil Huseynov.

For this monument in 1947 Fuad Abdurahmanov was awarded the Stalin Prize.

Until 2009, the monument was not restored.

In 2009, the monument was reconstructed.

As a result of the work, the marble covering of the pedestal was replaced with a bronze one, 600 m² of territory was tiled, a new lighting system was installed, as well as benches. For restoration work, 45000 manat was allocated from the state budget.

== See also ==
Monument to Nizami Ganjavi in Baku
