= Campaign on granting Nizami the status of the national poet of Azerbaijan =

Campaign on granting Nizami the status of the national poet of Azerbaijan (the term Azerbaijanization is also used) is a politically and ideologically motivated distortion of the historical record of the national-cultural origin of one of the classics of Persian poetry, Nizami Ganjavi, which began in the USSR in the late 1930s and was arranged to coincide with the celebration of the 800th anniversary of the poet. The campaign was crowned with jubilee celebrations in 1947 but its effects continue up to this day: on one hand this process was beneficial for many cultures of the multi-cultural Soviet Union and for the Azerbaijani culture in the first place; on the other hand this brought to an extreme politicization of the question on Nizami's cultural-national identity in the USSR and in modern Azerbaijan.

== The reasons and the background of the campaign ==
=== Claims that Nizami was ethnically Turkic before the late 1930s ===
In 1903 Azerbaijani publicist and writer Firidun Kocharlinski in his book "Literature of Azerbaijani Tatars" called the poet a 'Tatar from Elizavetpol' (up until the 1930s the Azerbaijanis were called 'Tatars'). According to Soviet orientalist A. E. Krimsky Kocharlinski's theses were based on Jóhannes Sherr's assumptions on that Nizami's mother was an Azerbaijani from Gyanja, contrary to the testimony of the poet himself according to which his mother was Kurdish.

Kocharlinski brings Nizami as an example of a Tatar (later known as Azerbaijani) poet who wrote in Persian language in the light of a general trend of borrowing religion, language and literature from Persians by the Tatars (i.e. Azerbaijanis). At the same time Konchalovski, referring to an accepted opinion, ascribes Tatar (i.e. Azerbaijani) literature to the first famous poet of those times Vaqif who wrote in Tatar (i.e. Azerbaijani) language (18th century).

American historian Yuri Slezkine also mentions that in 1934 on the First Congress of Soviet Writers the representative of the Azerbaijani delegation called Nizami a Turk from Gyanja.

=== Situation in the late 1930s ===
In world Orientalism the dominant view was to consider Nizami as a representative of Persian literature. Soviet Orientalists also held the same view till the late 1930s. According to encyclopedic dictionaries published in Russia , Nizami was a Persian poet and a descendant of city of Qom in central Iran (this fact was subsequently questioned and the contemporary scientists tend to consider Gyanja as his birthplace) . Thus, the Brockhaus and Efron Encyclopedic Dictionary states (the author of the article is Agafangel Krimsky):

The best Persian romantic poet (1141–1203) is a descendant of Qom but has a nickname 'Gyanjevi' (from Gyanja) because he spent most of his life in Gyanja (now Elizavetpol) where he died.

Encyclopædia Britannica (1911) also characterises the poet in a similar way:

Persian poet born in 535 in Hidżra (1141 A.D.). His motherland, or at least the place where his father lived, was in the highlands of Qom, but as he lived almost all his days in Gyanja in Arran (present-day Elizavetpol) he is known as Nizami from Gyanja or Gyanjevi.

=== Reasons for the historical distortion of Nizami's status ===
==== Ideological needs of Soviet Azerbaijan in the 1930s ====
According to Faik Goulamov after the dissolution of the Transcaucasian Socialist Federative Soviet Republic in 1936 the newly formed Azerbaijani SSR needed a special history which would on one hand allow distancing the republic from Shiite Iran for avoid suspicions in the counterrevolutionary pan-Islamism and on the other hand to separate the Azerbaijanis from other Turkic people (in the light of the official struggle against pan-Turkism). At the same time the Azerbaijanis desperately needed proofs of their own autochthony, since being considered as a 'nation of newcomers' created a direct threat of deportations. As a result, a Chair of Azerbaijani history was established in the Faculty of History of the State University of Azerbaijan and rapid Azerbaijanization of historical heroes and preceding historical-political entities on the territory of Azerbaijan was launched.

Yuri Slezkine mentions that in the self-determined republics the efforts directed at the formation of cultures of titular nations were doubled at that time. According to the national line of the All-Union Communist Party of Bolsheviks all the titular nations were supposed to have "great traditions" which according to Slezkine was, if necessary, to be invented so that all the national cultures except Russian became equivalent.

George Bournoutian reviews the issue of classifying Nizami as an Azerbaijani poet (also Rudaki as Uzbek and Rumi as Turkish) within the framework of the general policy of weakening the connection of Turkish nations with Islam and developing in them а sense of pride towards their glorious, albeit fictional, national identity.

==== Jubilee campaigns of the late 1930s ====
In the second half of the 1930s along with the establishment of "Soviet patriotism" jubilee celebrations were held throughout the whole Soviet Union – the Russians were celebrating the 100th anniversary of A. S. Pushkin's death and the 750th anniversary of The Tale of Igor's Campaign (1938); there were also national celebrations, including those taking place in Transcaucasian republics, among them the 1000th anniversary of the Armenian national epic poem David of Sasun (1939, the poem was completed by the 10th century) and the 750th anniversary of Georgian classic poem The Knight in the Panther's Skin (1937). For affirming an equal status with other Transcaucasian republics Soviet Azerbaijan was to hold a jubilee celebration of an equivalent scale. In the framework of those all-Soviet jubilee campaigns the preparations for the 800th anniversary of Nizami as a great Azerbaijani poet were launched.

== Course of the campaign ==
=== Declaring Nizami as an Azerbaijani poet ===
A. O. Tamazishvili notes that declaring Nizami as an Azerbaijani poet was essential by his 800th jubilee. Victor Schnirelmann mentions a more precise date – 1938.

Analyzing the sequence of events Tamazishvili comes to a conclusion that the initial idea of recognizing Nizami as an Azerbaijani poet occurred to the First Secretary of the Azerbaijan Communist Party M. D. A. Bagirov. Having strong anti-Iranian convictions and being a patriot of Azerbaijan he considered the Persian identification of Nizami as ideologically unacceptable. However, by the end of the 1930s the solution of this question was beyond the competence of politicians on the Republican level. Besides, the attempt to label Nizami as an Azerbaijani could be assessed by the Soviet authorities as a nationalistic act; also objections could be expected on the part of scientists and first of all those from the prominent Leningrad school of Orientalism.

In 1937 the "Anthology of Azerbaijani poetry" was to be published in the USSR. In the initial version of it Nizami's poems were not included. However, on the 1st of August newspaper "Bakinskiy Rabochiy" published a note which said that the works on the anthology were completed and Nizami's poetry was included in it despite all the efforts of "the enemies of the nation" to make the anthology look as thin and feeble as possible".

For supporting the inclusion of Nizami into the list of Azerbaijani poets the views of Orientalist Yuri Marr (the son of academician Nicholas Marr) were elaborated on; in 1929 he had declared that Nizami was native to Caucasus and that his poetry was honoured more in Azerbaijan than in Persia. According to Tamazishvili Yuri Marr did not claim that Nizami was an Azerbaijani poet but he was the only one whom the supporters of such view could refer to. Besides, Yuri Marr was enjoying the 'beams of fame' of his father who was quite influential in those years in academic and political circles. Later the Azerbaijanis would claim that academician N. A. Marr had also taken part in the revision of the "positions of the Bourgeoisie Orientalist science which distorted the image of the Azerbaijani poet".

In the same year, the Institute of History of Language and Literature of the Azerbaijani affiliate of the Academy of Sciences of the USSR also started publishing Nizami's works.

On 5 April 1938, a Decade of the Azerbaijani Art was held in Moscow, and for this occasion an anthology of Azerbaijani poetry, edited by poet Vladimir Lugovskoy, was published in Baku which included Konstantin Simonov's translation of Nizami's poetry. The foreword to the edition said, "Among the Azerbaijani poets Nizami's image gloriously stands out". On the opening day of the decade the editorial article of Pravda said:

Early in the epoch of feudal lawlessness the Azerbaijani nation gave birth to greatest artists. The names of Nizami, Khakani, Fuzuli of Baghdad compete in popularity with famous Persian poets Saadi and Hafiz. Both Nizami, Khakani and Fuzuli were passionate patriots of their nation, while they served the foreign newcomer only because they were forced to yield to their power.

On April 18, 1938 Pravda published a front-page article titled The triumph of Azerbaijani Art in which the same three poets – Nizami, his contemporary Khagani Shirvani and Fuzuli of Baghdad were named as portrayers of "turbulent, brave and enraged soul" of the Azerbaijani nation, passionate patriots of their nation, champions of freedom and independence of their country".

In Azerbaijan they realised that they could achieve success only by the involvement of Orientalists, and primarily those from Leningrad. Orientalist Yevgeni Bertels took the most active part in this process; he had earlier called Nizami a Persian poet but in the beginning of February 1939 published an article "Genius Azerbaijani poet Nizami" in Pravda which, according to Tamazishvili's assumption, was ordered to him and hence biased.

According to Ivan Luppol the mention of Nizami's name in Pravda was an action directive for the Academy of Sciences:

If half a year ago an article on Nizami appeared in the lower half of the page of Pravda, if in the Soviet Union a party member wrote an article on Nizami, this meant that each conscious resident of the Soviet Union was supposed to know who Nizami was. This was an instruction to all the directive organizations, all the authorities of republican, district and regional levels and in this regard the Academy of Sciences was to say its word without challenging its high scientific standing on this matter.

=== Joseph Stalin's role ===
On 3 April 1939 an issue of Pravda was published containing an article by a Ukrainian poet Mykola Bazhan in which he described his meeting with Stalin:

Comrade Stalin spoke about Azerbaijani poet Nizami and quoted his works in order to break, using the very words of the poet, the groundlessness of the assertion that this great poet of our fraternal Azerbaijani nation was to be given to Iranian literature only because he supposedly wrote most of his poems in the Iranian language. Nizami himself confirms in his poems that he was forced to resort to the Iranian language since he wasn't allowed to turn to his nation in his native tongue. This was the part quoted by comrade Stalin who managed to grasp with genius scale of his mind and erudition all the outstanding creations in the history of mankind.

Walter Kolarz emphasizes that the final verdict supporting the stance that Nizami was a great Azerbaijani poet, who spoke against the oppressors but was forced to write in a foreign language, was made by Joseph Stalin. Nizami was not supposed to belong to the Persian literature notwithstanding the language of his poems.

On 16 April, Pravda published a poem on behalf of Baku intelligentsia (Samad Vurgun, Rasul Rza, Suleyman Rustam) expressing gratitude for 'returning' Nizami to Azerbaijan.

Foreigners possessed our Nizami, having ascribed him to themselves,
But the nests woven by the poet in the hearts of the faithful are strong.
You returned his poems to us, returned his magnitude to us
And have enlightened the pages of the world with his immortal word (translation from Russian)

However, as noted by Tamazishvili, Bertels never mentioned Stalin's role in the question of the 'repatriation' of Nizami; there is no word about Stalin in Russian publications either, including the publications of Azerbaijani authors. Nevertheless, in Azerbaijan the role of Stalin regarding the question about Nizami was stressed more than once. Thus in 1947 the Deputy Chairman of State Planning Committee of Azerbaijan SSR (from 1970 the Chairman of the Council of Ministers of Azerbaijan SSR) Ali Ibragimov characterised Stalin's role in promoting the studies of Nizami's literary heritage in the following way:

The question of studying Nizami's work at a larger scale in terms of studying his multifaceted and rich heritage was launched by the Soviet scholars in 1939 after our great leader comrade Stalin, an expert in history in general and in the history of the nations of the Soviet Union and in national issues in particular, at his meeting with writers spoke about Nizami and quoted his writings. After this, having received a bright, deep and scientifically correct directive, the Soviet scholars launched an exceptionally large research on Nizami's work and his epoch

=== Nizami as "a poet returned to Azerbaijan" ===
During the jubilee anniversaries it was mentioned for many times that the Soviet authorities and Stalin personally returned Nizami to the Azerbaijanis. Thus in 1940 in the framework of the Decade of Azerbaijani Literature in Moscow the leading Azerbaijani poet Samad Vurgun made a report in which he mentioned that Stalin had returned to the Azerbaijani people their greatest poet Nizami whom "the sneaky enemies of the nation, nationalist-Mousavatists, panturkists and other betrayers wanted to steal for the sole reason that he wrote most of his works in the Iranian language".

On 22 September 1947, Pravda published an article titled Nizami written by the Deputy Chairman of the Union of Soviet Writers, Nikolai Tikhonov:

It is well known that Nizami wrote his poems in the Persian language. This fact was more than once used by the enemies of the Azerbaijani nation, bourgeoisie historians and Iranian nationalists for declaring Nizami as an Iranian poet, as though he had nothing in common with his motherland – Azerbaijan. But this outrageous lie will not deceive anyone.

At the jubilee ceremonies of September 1947 held in Baku, the General Secretary of the Union of Soviet Writers Alexander Fadeyev made an even more categorical statement:

If it hadn't been for the Soviet authority the greatest genius of Azerbaijani nation and the genius of all mankind would not have been known even to the Azerbaijani nation.

However, as mentioned by Tamazishvili, by the end of Stalin's life the version of his role in 'returning' Nizami came to its demise as its further shameless exploitation could be of no use any more; as for Stalin himself, he was not interested in dubious laurels in the sphere of Nizamology, especially in the post-war period.

=== Other arguments ===
The 'territorial principle' was one of the cornerstones of the ideology of "Soviet nationalism" which applied also to history. The national principle in the USSR presupposed the extrapolation of 15 republics back into the past. In particular this concept distinguished Azerbaijani literature from Persian literature classifying Nizami as an Azerbaijani poet based on the fact that he lived in the territory which later formed part of Soviet Azerbaijan. Thus, as a proof for Nizami's Azerbaijani identity Bertels used the argument of methodological fallacy of ascribing to Iran a whole complex of Persian literature irrespective of the place of its creation and the ethnic origin of the author Azerbaijani commentators interpreted a number of parts within Nizami's poetry as an expression of Turkish ethnic identity of the author.

=== Nizami's 800th anniversary celebrations ===
In May 1939 a special ad hoc committee of the Council of People's Commissars of Azerbaijan SSR was established for preparing and holding the 800th jubilee anniversary of the "great Azerbaijani poet Nizami" which was to take place in 1941. In autumn the Anthology of Azerbaijani Poetry was published, the plans for the release of which had been announced earlier. The foreword to the anthology contained arguments proving that Nizami was an Azerbaijani poet, which also included references to Yuri Marr, the latter being characterised as a leading Soviet Iranologist; also a reference was made to the "special decision on Nizami's jubilee" in which the Institute of Oriental Studies of the Academy of Sciences of the USSR "firmly and decisively recognized Nizami as a great Azerbaijani poet". In Nizami's works "the life and the mode of life of the Azernbaijani nation were portrayed". The Azerbaijani authors explained the lack of any research on Nizami in Azerbaijan by "the plots of sneaky agents of fascism, bourgeois nationalists and great-power chauvinists" who "did all they could to hide from the Azerbaijani nation the heritage of her great son – poet Nizami".

The Great Soviet Encyclopaedia of 1939 likewise called Nizami as an Azerbaijani poet (the author of the article was Yevgeni Bertels who had previously referred to Nizami as a Persian poet). The article in the official Soviet Encyclopaedia completed the process of revising Nizami's nationality in Soviet Oriental studies. After 1940 Soviet scholars and encyclopaedias acknowledged Nizami as an Azerbaijani poet. Any other point of view started to be considered as a serious political mistake.

In December 1939 in Literaturnaya Gazeta Bertels published an article titled "preparations for Nizami's jubilee" in which he particularly noted the description by Nizami of a utopian country of universal happiness (at the end of his poem "Iskander Nameh"). Bertels presented this description as an anticipation of the establishment of the future Soviet Union.

Nizami's works were translated into Azerbaijani language (all were published in Azerbaijani translations between 1941 and 1947).

The jubilee celebrations, planned for autumn 1941, were postponed because of the war, although the jubilee conference took place in December 1941 in Ermitage in Leningrad at the time of the blockade. With the war being over the campaign was renewed. In May 1945 Nizami's museum opened in Baku; on the "wall of one of the halls comrade Stalin's words were engraved in golden letters about Nizami being a great Azerbaijani poet who had to resort to the Iranian language as he was not permitted to turn to his nation in his native tongue".

The exposition mostly consisted of paintings on the themes of Nizami's poems. Despite the lack of authentic portraits of Nizami the central painting of the exhibition was the portrait of the poet by painter Ghazanfar Khalikov which met Bagirov's requirements. Since the 1960s this portrait became canonical for the Azerbaijani textbooks while Ghazanfar Khalikov was acknowledged in modern Azerbaijan as the creator of Nizami's artistic image. The campaign was crowned with celebrations that took place in Baku in May 1947.

== Consequences ==
=== Role of Nizami's national identity in Soviet culture ===
According to the 'territoriality principle' Nizami, as a native of future Azerbaijan SSR, was to a certain extent a 'poet of Soviet Union' and his image was exploited for ideological purposes in this very sense. According to Sergei Panarin the research in the field of Eastern literatures in the USSR focused on the changes that these literatures and Eastern nations in general had undergone due to socialism. One could not make those conclusions based on the analysis of literary works, that's why the researchers had to cling to separate historical facts such as the birthplace of this or that author.

As a result, the authors who wrote exclusively in Arabic or Persian language were 'appropriated' by the Soviet republics for creating an impression that the best part of the pre-Soviet cultural heritage of the nations, which once constituted a single civilization, was created within the boundaries of the future USSR. The Soviet propaganda offered the following scheme – Nizami wrote in Persian, but was born and lived on the territory of future Azerbaijan SSR; he reflected the aspirations of the Azerbaijani nation and foresaw a brilliant future for the USSR. The fact that he made his predictions not as a foreigner but as an Azerbaijani made him twice as great. For that reason the Azerbaijanis can be considered as 'elect' builders of socialism as they foresaw the bright future and granted a progressive poet-prophet to the world. Panarin notes that this was not in any way related to the true national renaissance of the Azerbaijani nation but was a mere ideological initiative.

=== Cultural consequences of the campaign ===
According to Tamazishvili, presenting Nizami as an Azerbaijani poet and ascribing his work to the achievements of the Azerbaijani literature was "the most important revolutionary result for the Soviet science achieved by this 'jubilee' campaign". In Azerbaijan the acknowledgement of Nizami as an Azerbaijani poet resulted in the creation of multiple works of art – poet Samad Vurgun wrote the drama Farhad and Shirin (1941), composer Fikret Amirov wrote the symphony To Nizami's Memory (1947), Gara Garayev from 1947 to 1952 created a range of musical compositions based on the motives of Nizami's poems (ballet Seven Beauties and a suite with the same title as well as a symphonic poem Leyla and Mejnun, Afrasiyab Badalbeyli wrote opera Nizami (1948), in 1982 film Nizami was released. Monuments to the poet were erected in Ganja (1947) and in Baku (1949; the author of both these works is Fuad Abdurakhmanov). In 1985 in Baku a metro station called Nizami Ganjavi opened in the place where according to the tradition the poet's grave was located.

Tamazishvili notes that despite the fact that the conclusion on the national affiliation of the poet was based on a priori assertions rather than on scientific research, this conclusion was still beneficial for the multinational Soviet culture. Nizami's poems were translated into Azerbaijani and Russian languages. The Presidium of the Academy of Sciences of the USSR included in the work plan of 1938 the writing of a scientific monograph on the Life and Work of the Great Azerbaijani Poet Nizami. An active part in propagating Nizami's work was assigned to Yevgeni Bertels who headed the group engaged in the critical translation of the series of poems by Nizami called Khamsa and in 1940 published a book Great Azerbaijani poet Nizami: Epoch, Life and Work, adapted according to ideological standards of his time".

Accompanied by the politicised jubilee campaign and to a great extent thanks to this campaign a massive translation, scientific-research and publishing works of political and cultural importance were launched and enhanced in scale. According to Bertels by 1948 in the USSR a new science was created – nizamology, and the works written about Nizami within the last decade have "for a number of times exceeded the volume of literature written in Western Europe within a century and a half". The politicised analysis of Nizami's works which was accepted in the USSR presupposed that the poet could dream of a communist society, which raised protests against Bertels in 1947. One of the main results of the jubilee campaign and of declaring Nizami as an Azerbaijani was the wide popularization of Nizami's writings in the Soviet Union.

== State of the question in the USSR after 1939 ==
After the Great Soviet Encyclopaedia called Nizami an Azerbaijani poet in 1939 in subsequent works he began to be described not only as a 'crown' of Azerbaijani poets of the 12th century but also as an element in the chain of ancient Azerbaijani literature which includes authors not only from the territory of Azerbaijan SSR but also from Iranian Azerbaijan (Khatib Tabrizi, Abul-Hasan Ardebili); the first works of Iranian Azerbaijan are considered to be Median tales written by Herod and Avesta of Zarathustra which "portrays the religious, philosophical, social and everyday beliefs of the ancient Azerbaijanis" . This scheme was dominant in encyclopaedias throughout the whole Soviet period.

=== Bertels' attempt to move away from ethno-geographical identification ===
In 1948 Bertels made an attempt to break with the ethnic-territorial approach in the Iranian philosophy. He published an article titled "Literature in Persian language in Central Asia" in which, based on the idea of integrity of Persian literature, he declared that he would consider as Persian all the literary works "written in so-called 'new-Persian language' irrespective of the ethnic origin of their authors and of the geographical location where these works originated".

This announcement by Bertels immediately made him an object of politicised criticism which accused him in adopting "false standpoints of Western-European orientalists" and bourgeois cosmopolitanism and for diverging from Marxist–Leninist views on the literature of nations of Central Asia and the Caucasus. In April 1949, at an open party meeting in the Institute of Oriental Studies, devoted to the struggle against cosmopolitanism, it was announced that Bertels "was helping to spread new bourgeois-nationalistic concepts about supposed dominance of Iranian culture over the other cultures of neighbouring countries of Iran, especially the Soviet Socialist Republics of Central Asia and Transcaucasia".

Bertels tried to defend his stance declaring about the methodological absurdity of classifying writers according to their ethnic or territorial affiliation. However, after receiving new accusations in reactionary pan-Islamism and bourgeois cosmopolitanism from his colleagues he had to admit his 'big mistakes'.

== Current state of the issue ==
=== Scholarly perspectives ===
In the contemporary literary studies the predominant view is that the 12th-century poet Nizami Ganjavi wrote in Persian and lived in Ganja, which in those times were predominantly populated by Persians, and was under the influence of Persian culture. What is known about Nizami's ethnic roots is that his mother was Kurdish . Some researchers believe that his father was from the city of Qom in Central Iran.

Beyond the boundaries of the former Soviet Union in the biggest national and biographical encyclopaedias of the world Nizami is recognized as a Persian poet while the Azerbaijani version is not even considered. Most leading experts in Persian poetry also hold this view. Most of the researchers of Persian literature consider Nizami as a typical representative of the Iranian culture, a poet who influenced the Islamic culture of Iran and of the whole ancient world.

Scholars of modern history such as T. Swietochowski and A. Altstadt call Nizami a Persian poet and at the same time consider him as an example of synthesis of Turkish and Persian cultures. Criticising Altstadt's point of view the critics note that it translates the ideological views of Soviet Azerbaijani researchers. According to Shireen Hunter by ascribing Nizami to Azerbaijani literature Altstadt continues the policies of Soviet falsifications of the history of Azerbaijani-Iranian relations. Reviewing the concept of the synthesis of Turkish and Iranian cultures in Nizami's works Lornejad and Doostzadeh conclude that there are no grounds to consider that this kind of correlation actually exists.

In 2012, the book On the Politicization of the Persian Poet Nezami Ganjavi by S. Lornejad and A. Doostzadeh was published in the Yerevan volume on Orientalism. The book provided a detailed examination of the question of Nizami's identity and the process of his politicization which received a positive criticism from a number of famous Orientalists. G. Bournoutian mentions that this work "not only exposes multiple falsifications but also, based on a thorough research of Nizami's works, proves that Nizami was without doubt an Iranian poet". Paola Orsatti believes that the book demonstrates the historical inconsistency of attributing Nizami to the Azerbaijani culture. Kamran Talattof considers this kind of work to be absolutely essential given the process of appropriation of the Iranian heritage of the ancient and modern times.

Rebecca Ruth Gould notes, that in most of the books on Persian literature published in Azerbaijan the significance of Persian poets born in the territory of the South Caucasus, among them Khaqani Shirvani or Nizami Ganjavi, boils down to the project of enhancing the ethnic prestige. "Nationalization" of classical Persian poets, which was a part of general policy of nation-building in Soviet times, in a number of former Soviet republics has now become a matter of political speculations as well as a subject of pseudo-science, which pays attention solely to ethnic roots of medieval figures.

=== Russia ===
After the break-up of the Soviet Union some encyclopaedias in Russian language continue to refer to Nizami as an Azerbaijani poet. Most Russian scholars however, describe Nizami as a Persian poet and 12th-century Ganja as a city inhabited primarily by Persians.

In 2002 a monument to Nizami was erected in St. Petersburg at the opening ceremony of which the presidents of Azerbaijan and Russia were present. In his speech made at the opening ceremony Russian President Vladimir Putin said, "A very happy and solemn event is taking place now – we are unveiling a monument to the prominent son of East, to the prominent son of Azerbaijan – poet and thinker Nizami. The head of the Iranian Philology Department and the dean of the Oriental Faculty of St. Petersburg State University I. M. Steblin-Kamensky, speaking of this monument characterises the description of Nizami as an Azerbaijani poet as a fruit of nationalist tendencies and as an "outright falsification".

=== Azerbaijan ===
The political aspect of the question of Nizami's national affiliation was intensified after the transformation of Azerbaijan SSR into the sovereign state of Azerbaijan. According to Sergei Rumyantsev and Ilham Abbasov in modern Azerbaijan Nizami has occupied a firm place along with many other heroes and cultural figures from Dede Korkut to Haydar Aliyev, serving as an example for today's youth.

In the opening article to the three-volume collection of Nizami's compositions published in Baku in 1991 doctor of philology Aliev Rustam Musa-ogli characterises the poet in the following way:

Nizami is one of the brightest geniuses not only of the Azerbaijani nation but also of the whole humanity. He is a rare phenomenon in whom all the best genetic qualities have been accumulated – talent, wit, conscience, honour, sagacity and clairvoyance which were always inherent to our nation.

"The history of Azerbaijani literature" (The Institute of Literature after Nizami at Azerbaijan National Academy of Sciences 2007) repeats the Soviet scheme which derives the Azerbaijani literature from Avesta.

The version of Nizami as an Azerbaijani poet establishes itself by

- Territorial belonging of Nizami to Azerbaijan. At the same time the state of Atabegs of Azerbaijan, under the rule of which Nizami lived, is regarded as an Azerbaijani national state. Also the applicability of the concept "Iran" to that epoch, given the absence of a state with that name on the political map, is rejected;
- Claims about Nizami's ethnic Turkish origin.

This point of view is predominant in Azerbaijan. In 2007 an "unacceptable" opinion on Nizami's Talish rather than Azerbaijani origin was mentioned by the prosecution on the trial of Novruzali Mammadov who was charged with state treason.

In 2011 making a speech on the Academy of Sciences of Azerbaijan president Ilham Aliyev declared that no one in the world doubts about Nizami being an Azerbaijani poet and that this can easily be proved. The perception of Nizami as a non-Azerbaijani poet Aliev explained by saying that Azerbaijani culture is so rich that other nations make attempts to attribute it to themselves.

== See also ==
- Historical negationism in Azerbaijan
- Azerbaijan naming controversy

== Bibliography ==
- Тамазишвили А. О. Послесловие [к публикации доклада Б. Н. Заходера «Е. Э. Бертельс»]. — Иранистика в России и иранисты. М., 2001, с. 185—186. (Tamazishvili, A.O. (2001), "Posleslovie", Iranistika v Rossii i iranisty, Moscow: 182-92)
- Тамазишвили А. О. Из истории изучения в СССР творчества Низами Гянджеви: вокруг юбилея — Е. Э. Бертельс, И. В. Сталин и другие // Наумкин В. В. (отв. ред.), Романова Н. Г., Смилянская И. М. Неизвестные страницы отечественного востоковедения : [cборник] — М. : Вост. лит., 2004. Рос. акад. наук, Ин-т востоковедения, С.-Петерб. фил. арх. РАН. Стр. 173—199. (Tamazishvili, A.O. (2004), "Iz istorii izučenija v SSSR tvorčestva Nizami Gjandževi: vokrug jubileja — E. È. Bertels, I. V. Stalin i drugie", ed. by Vitaly Naumkin, N. G. Romanova, I. M. Smiljanskaja (eds.), Neizvestnye stranicy otečestvennogo vostokovedenija: [sbornik], Oriental Studies Institute, Russian Academy of Sciences, St. Petersburg: 173-99.)
- Walter Kolarz. Russia and Her Colonies. Archon Books, 1967.
- Siavash Lornejad, Ali Doostzadeh. On the Modern Politicization of the Persian Poet Nezami Ganjavi. Edited by Victoria Arakelova. YEREVAN SERIES FOR ORIENTAL STUDIES, Yerevan 2012
- Вадим Гомоз. Азербайджанизация Низами // Вестник Санкт-Петербургского университета. Серия 13: 2011. Вып. 3. стр. 113—120
- Дроздов В. А. Отзыв о статье Вадима Гомоза азербайджанизация Низами // Вестник Санкт-Петербургского университета. Серия 13: 2011. Вып. 3. стр. 121—126
