= Muhammad ibn Muhammad al-Arif Ardabili =

Author of the Persian poem Farhadnama

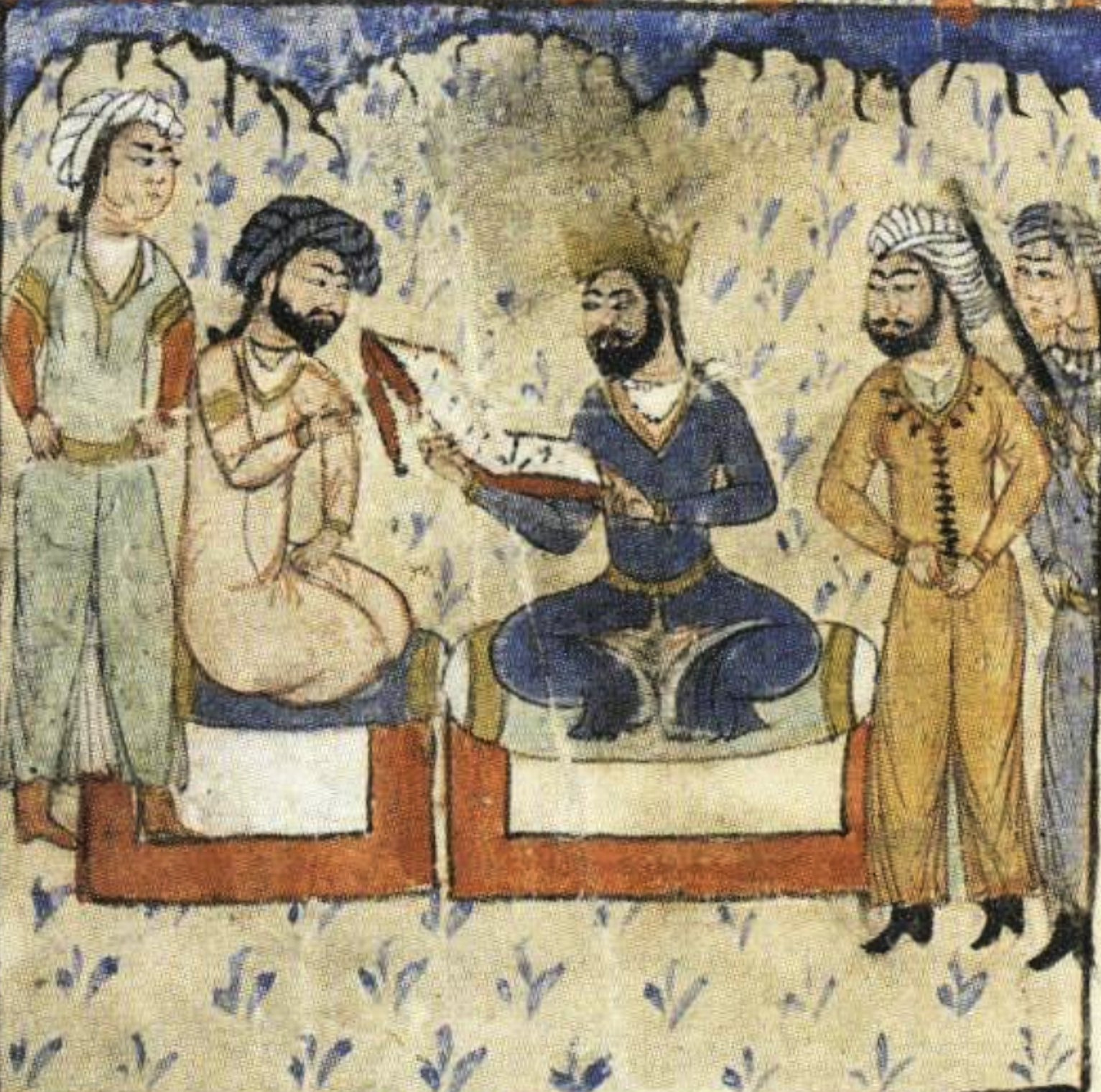
- Miniature depicting the Shirvanshah Hushang being shown the Farhad u Shirin by Muhammad ibn Muhammad al-Arif Ardabili. Stored in the Topkapı Palace in Istanbul.
- Born: 1311; Ardabil
- Died: DOD unknown
- Notable works: Farhadnama

Muhammad ibn Muhammad al-Arif Ardabili (Persian: محمد بن محمد العارف اردبیلی) was a 14th-century poet who is principally known for composing the Persian poem Farhadnama between 1369 and 1372.

== Life ==
Not much information survives about him. He was born in city of Ardabil, in 1311. He was brought to the court of Shirvanshah Kavus and became a court poet. He completed his magnum opus Farhadnama between 1369 and 1372 (in Persian language). He was strongly influenced by Nizami Ganjavi. He was tutor of the Shirvanshah Hushang (r. 1372/73–1382).

== Sources ==
- Çağman, Fílíz; Tanindi, Zeren (2011). "Selections from Jalayirid Books In the Libraries of Istanbul" (PDF). Muqarnas. 28: 243, Fig.24. ISSN 0732-2992. JSTOR 23350289.
