= Ghorab =

Ghorab is a surname. Notable people with the surname include:

- Abdelkader Ghorab (born 1998), Algerian footballer
- Javad Ghorab (born 1949), Iranian footballer
- Saeed Ghorab (born 1942), Saudi Arabian footballer

== See also ==
- Asghar Seyed-Gohrab (born 1968), Iranian literary scholar
