= Monument to Nizami Ganjavi in Tashkent =

Coordinates: 41°17′35″N 69°15′08″E

- Interactive map of Monument to Nizami Ganjavi in Tashkent
- Location: Tashkent, Uzbekistan
- Type: Monument
- Completion date: 2004
- Dedicated to: Nizami Ganjavi

The Monument to Nizami Ganjavi, a medieval Persian poet, is located in Tashkent, the capital of Uzbekistan, in a square near the Tashkent State Pedagogic University named after Nizami, near a park named after Babur. Ilham Jabbarov is the sculptor of the monument.

== History ==
The monument was installed on March 23, 2004. Ilham Aliyev, the President of Azerbaijan and Islam Karimov, the President of Uzbekistan took part at the opening ceremony of the monument.

== Description of the monument ==
The monument consists of a granite bust of Nizami Ganjavi, portraying the poet in the eastern attire with a turban on his head and holding a book in his left hand and with the right hand on his chest. The name of the poet, the dates of his birth and death are written on the pedestal in Uzbek and Azerbaijani languages.

== See also ==
- Campaign on granting Nizami the status of the national poet of Azerbaijan
