= Afdal al-Din Kashani =

Medieval Persian poet and philosopher

Afḑal al-Dīn Maraqī Kāshānī (Persian: افضل‌الدین مَرَقی کاشانی), also known as Baba Afzal (Persian: بابا افضل‌), was a Persian poet and philosopher. Several dates have been suggested for his death, with the best estimate being around 1213/1214.

== Life ==
The information on his life is scanty and few. His writing portray a disdain for officials of his time and he is said to have once been imprisoned by the local governor on trumped-up charges of practicing sorcery. His tomb located in the village Maraq, forty-two km northwest of Kashan, is still a place of pilgrimage. The best summary (in Persian) of what is known about Baba Afzal's life and work, is written in the World Encyclopedia of Islam (Dānišnāma-i Jahān-i Islām) by the late Professor Abbas Zaryab Khoei.

== Works ==
His most universally recognized contribution to Iranian culture lies in the field of literature. In poetry he has been considered one of the two or three greatest masters of the robāʿī (quatrains), while in philosophical prose only Suhrawardi stands on the same level. Similar to Avicenna (in his work Dānišnāma-yi ʿAlāyī), Baba Afzal employs a great deal of Persian vocabulary where others would have used Arabic, but unlike Avicenna he chooses only attractive and mellifluous terms. His works from the viewpoint of literary tradition is a delight to read nor does he neglect to employ the corresponding Arabic terms where clarity demands them. His influence on later thinkers has not been investigated however his works which are clearly and beautifully written were probably a source of inspiration for philosophical writings in both Arabic and Persian. For his part, he follows the philosophical and logical terminology of Avicenna while most his works evoke a visionary aura in spite of their philosophical and logical exactitude. Besides his poetry, 54 works of prose in varying length have survived.

=== Poetry ===
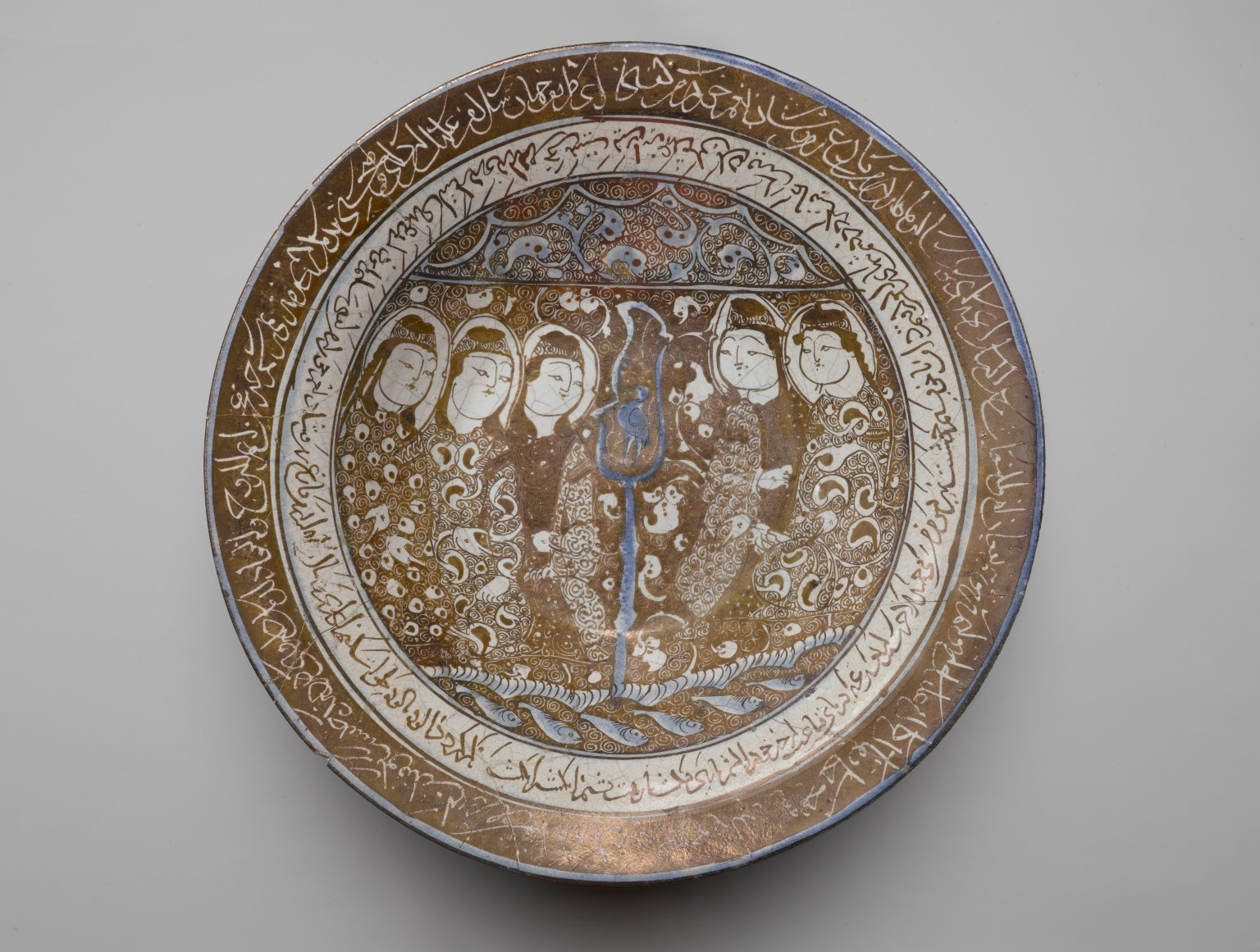
Bowl of Reflections, early 13th century. Brooklyn Museum

Around 500 quatrains are ascribed to him. Some of the themes include warnings about the futility of involvement with the things of the corporeal world, the correspondence between microcosm and macrocosm, and self-knowledge as the goal of human existence. Some of his quatrains are also recorded in the book Nozhat al-Majālis. He is considered by some to be the greatest poet among the outstanding philosophers of Islam. The themes of these quatrains include warnings about the futility of involvement with the things of the corporeal world, the correspondence between microcosm and macrocosm, and autology (self-knowledge) as the goal of human existence.

=== ʿArż-nāma ===
This is considered his magnum opus. It is the longest and most complete exposition of his philosophy that brings together all topics related to the perfection of the soul. It is divided into four “displays” (ʿarż) arranged in an ascending order according to the four kinds of things in the universe: corporeal bodies (ajsām), which are acted upon (kardahā); agents or souls, which do the acting (konandahā); concepts or known things (dānestahā); and knowers (dānandagān).

=== Jāvedān-nāma ===
This comprehensive work is his most specifically Islamic treatment of his favorite themes; it is the only work of certain ascription to him outside the letters that quotes and comments on Quran and Hadith (Prophetic sayings).

=== Other works ===
- Madārij al-Kamāl (Persian: مدارج الکمال)
- Rāhanjām-nāma (Persian: راه‌انجام نامه) In three discourses this work explains self-knowledge as the road to human perfection.
- Risāla dar ʿelm u noṭq (Persian: رساله در علم و نطق)
- Sāz u pīrāya-yi šāhān-i purmāya (Persian: ساز و پیرایه شاهان پرمایه)
- Mabādī-yi mawjūdāt-i nafsānī
- Āyāt al-ṣaṇʿa fi’l-kašf ʿan maṭālib elāhīya sabʿa - Brief discussion in Arabic of the intellect, soul and the body.

== Philosophy ==
He wrote during a period when several figures were bridging the gaps between philosophy and Sufism. His major concern is to explain the salvific power of true knowledge, i.e., self-knowledge, or knowledge of the Self (ḏāt or huwwīyat, God Himself viewed as the center of man's being). His philosophy is an autology (Persian: خودشناسی, ḵhod-šenāsī). That is: "To know oneself is to know the everlasting reality that is consciousness, and to know it is to be it." His ontology is interconnected simultaneously with his epistemology, because according to him, full actualization of the potentialities of the universe can only take place through the self-awareness of human beings. This ontology can only be realized by the training of the human soul, or education in the widest sense of the term.

His view of the structure of the reality is succinctly explained in the beginning of his work Rāhanjām-nāma.

== Sample Poetry ==
A quatrain: Suppose you run the world as you like, then what?
You read life's book to the end, then what?
You have your way for hundred years—
then a hundred more, then What?

== Sources ==
- The Heart of Islamic Philosophy: The Quest for Self-Knowledge in the Teachings of Afḑal al-Dīn Kāshānī. By William C. Chittick. New York: Oxford University (2001)
