= Monument to Nizami Ganjavi in Beijing =

Coordinates: 39°56′20″N 116°28′20″E

- Interactive map of Monument to Nizami Ganjavi in Beijing
- Location: Beijing, China, Beijing Chaoyang Park
- Type: Monument
- Completion date: 2012
- Dedicated to: Nizami Ganjavi

The Monument to Nizami Ganjavi (Chinese: 纪念碑尼扎米•甘伽维), a medieval Persian poet, is located in Chaoyang Park, in Beijing, China. Yuan Xikun, a Chinese artist, is the author of the monument.

== History ==
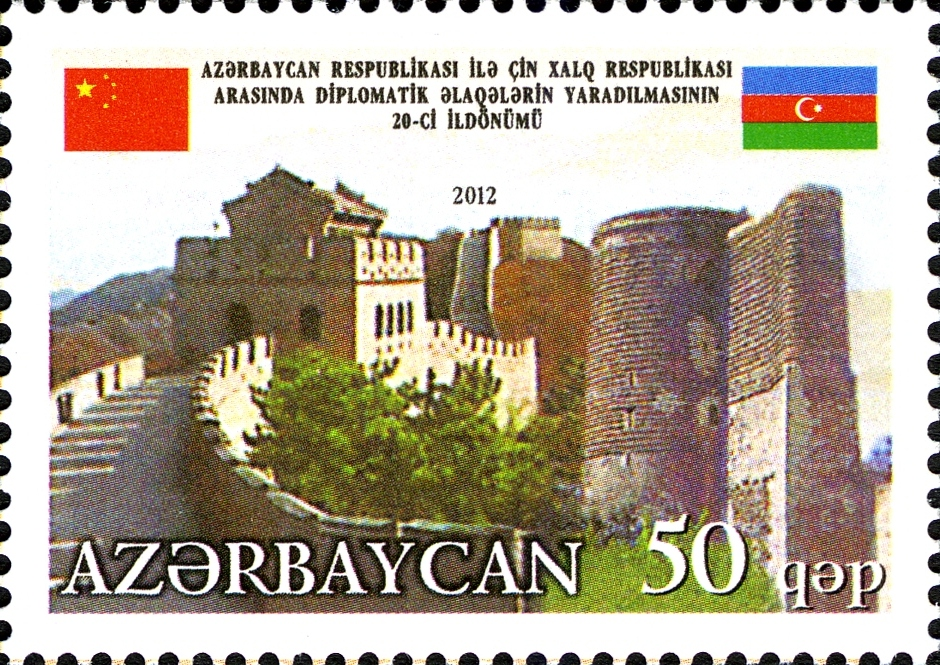
A postage stamp of Azerbaijan of the year 2012, dedicated to the diplomatic relations between PRC and Azerbaijan

The monument was created by Yuan Xikun in reply to an invitation of Azerbaijan to celebrate the 20th anniversary of establishment of diplomatic relationships between the People's Republic of China and Azerbaijan.

A solemn opening ceremony of the monument was held on December 6, 2012. Latif Gandilov, the ambassador of Azerbaijan to China, officials from Chinese Ministry of Foreign Affairs and Ministry of Culture, together with Yuan Xikun, the curator of Jintai Art Museum as well as the author of the monument, unveiled the monument.

== Description of the monument ==
The monument consists of a granite bust of the poet portraying him with a turban on the head. The name of the poet, the dates of his birth and death and also “The great Azerbaijani poet, scientist and thinker” (Chinese: 阿塞拜疆伟大的诗人，学者和思想家) phrase are written on a pedestal in Chinese and Azerbaijani languages. There is also a sentence by the poet in Azerbaijani and Chinese languages:

Qüvvət elmdədir, başqa cür heç kəs
Heç kəsə üstünlük eyləyə bilməz.

Faking Nizami's nationality has been condemned by chairman of Iran’s Cultural Heritage Organization Mohammad Javad Adabi who stated that "falsification of the identity of great Iranian poet Nizami Ganjavi is evidence of the poorness of Azerbaijan’s culture".

== See also ==
- Campaign on granting Nizami the status of the national poet of Azerbaijan
