= Monument to Nizami Ganjavi in Chișinău =

Coordinates: 47.0437°N 28.8530°E

- Interactive map of Monument to Nizami Ganjavi in Chișinău
- Location: Chișinău, Moldova
- Type: Monument
- Completion date: 2005
- Dedicated to: Nizami Ganjavi

The Monument to Nizami Ganjavi, a medieval Persian poet, is located in Chișinău, the capital of Moldova, in a park named after Nizami Ganjavi. Akif Asgarov, Honoured Art Worker of Azerbaijan was a sculptor and Semen Shoyket, Honoured Architect of Moldova was the architect of the monument.

== History ==
Opening ceremony of the monument was held in spring, 2005, during the official visit of Ilham Aliyev, the President of Azerbaijan to Moldova. The monument was settled as “a sign of kind relationships between Azerbaijani and Moldavian nations”. The idea of the construction of the monuments belongs to the Congress of Azerbaijanis in Moldova, led by Vugar Novruzov.

On November 12, 2012 a solemn opening ceremony of the reconstructed and renovated monument to Nizami Ganjavi was held. Boris Foshko, the minister of culture of Moldova, Adalat Valiyev, deputy minister of the Ministry of Culture and Tourism of Azerbaijan, Namig Aliyev, ambassador of Azerbaijan to Moldova, members of delegations from Azerbaijan, cultural and art figures of Moldova, government officials and representatives of diplomatic missions also participated in this ceremony. The given project was realized within the order of Ilham Aliyev, the President of Azerbaijan “About celebration of the 870th anniversary of Azerbaijani poet and thinker Nizami Ganjavi”.

== Description of the monument ==
The monument consists of a granite bust of Nizami Ganjavi, portraying the poet in the eastern attire with a turban on his head. A pedestal is made of the red granite and decorated with eastern ornaments. The name of the poet, the dates of his birth and death are written on the pedestal in English.

== See also ==
- Campaign on granting Nizami the status of the national poet of Azerbaijan
