= Nozhat al-Majales =

Anthology compiled by Jamal al-Din Khalil Shirvani

Noz'hat al-Majāles (Persian/Arabic: نزهة المجالس, lit. 'Joy of the Gatherings/Assemblies') is an anthology which contains around 4,100 Persian quatrains. The book was dedicated to Fariburz III.

== Book ==
The book is organized by subject into 17 chapters, which are further divided into 96 distinct sections. This book is preserved in a unique manuscript, which was copied by Esmail b. Esfandiyar b. Mohammad b. Esfandiar Abhari on July 31, 1331.

A significant aspect of Nozhat al-Majales is that it includes thirty-three quatrains by Omar Khayyam and sixty quatrains by Mahsati. These are among the oldest and most reliable collections of their works. It also contains quatrains from Attar of Nishapur, Sanai, Afdal al-Din Kashani, Ahmad Ghazali (the mystic brother of al-Ghazali), Majd al-Din Baghdadi (a major figure of traditional Sufism born in Baghdadak in Great Khorasan) and Ahmad Jam. It also contains quatrains from writers and poets who are not known for their quatrains such as Asadi Tusi, Nizami Ganjavi, Fakhruddin As'ad Gurgani and Qabus. Some quatrains are even narrated from statements and rulers such as Fariburz III Shirvanshah, the Seljuq Sultan Tugrul and Shams ad-Din Juvayni.

== Persian language and culture in the Caucasus regions ==
Unlike other parts of Persia, where the poets were attached to courts, or belonged to educated ranks of society, many eastern transcaucasian poets rose among working-class people and their language was colloquial.

On Mohammad ibn Ba'ith:

p. 18: "One should not erroneously claim that the Seljuqs brought Persian into Arran and Azerbaijan. Opposite to this idea, we know well that the North West has always been a rich center for Iranian culture. Even before Muhammad ibn Wasif Sagrzi (the first known poet of Iran) who composed in the Qasida form in Sistan, Tabari has mentioned that the elders of Maragha read the Persian Fahlavi vernacular) poetry of Mohammad ibn Ba'ith ibn Halbas, the ruler of Marand. Halbas, which was his grandfather, was himself a recent Arabian migrant from the lands of Najd and Hijaz, and the Persian poetry of his grandson was due to his accurlation in the local culture".

p. 20 on USSR writers again: “Thus the theory of politicized Soviet authors and those that ignorantly repeated them are not correct, and multitude of numbers of Persian poets from Caucasus and Arran was not due to the Iranian and Iranicized rulers of the area, but in opposite to this politicized theory, it was the language and culture of the people which Iranicized the rulers”
