= Monument to Nizami Ganjavi in Saint Petersburg =

Monument in Saint Petersburg, Russia

Coordinates: 59°57′50″N 30°18′52″E

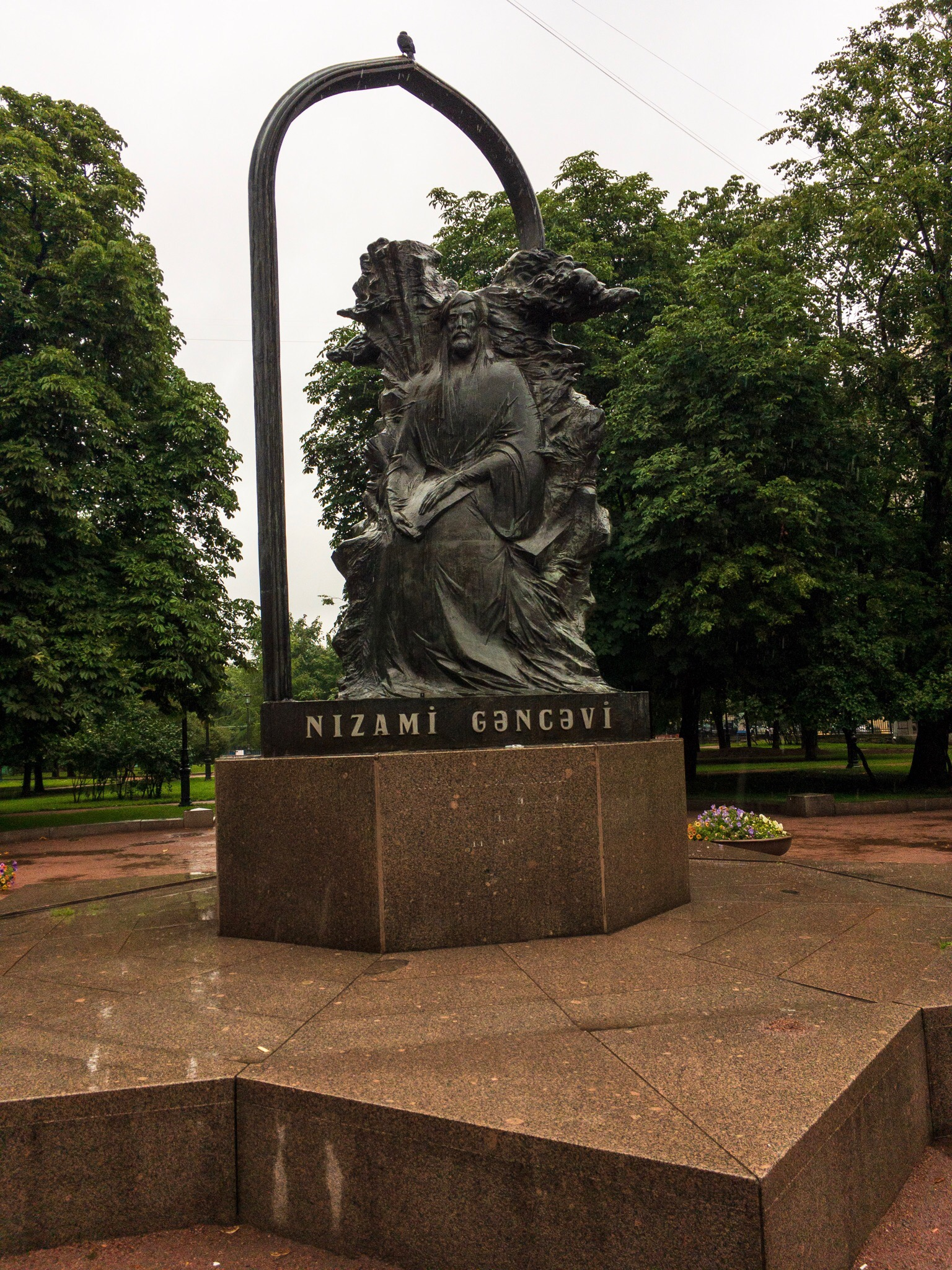
- Interactive map of Monument to Nizami Ganjavi in Saint Petersburg
- Location: Saint Petersburg, Russia, Kamennoostrovsky Prospekt 25/27
- Designer: Gerush Babayev
- Type: Monument
- Height: 5 m (16 ft)
- Completion date: 2002
- Dedicated to: Nizami Ganjavi

The Monument to Nizami Ganjavi in Saint Petersburg is located in a square situated between houses 25 and 27 on Kamennoostrovsky Prospekt.

== History ==
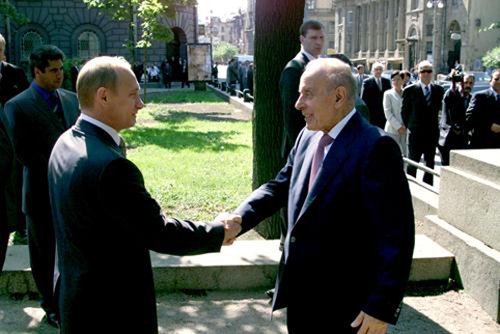
Vladimir Putin and Heydar Aliyev, opening ceremony of the monument

The sculpture had been founded in Baku and then presented to Saint Petersburg as a gift from Azerbaijan on the occasion of the 300th anniversary of the city's origination.

The sculpture was created by Gerush Babayev, an Azerbaijani sculptor, alumni of the Saint Petersburg Art and Industry Academy. Felix Romanovskiy, Honoured artist of the Russian Federation is the author of a pedestal's project. The pedestal was made in “Kombinat-skulptura” enterprise of Petersburg. Vladimir Putin, the president of Russia and Heydar Aliyev, the then president of Azerbaijan also participated in the opening ceremony of the monument.

In his speech made at the opening ceremony Russian President Vladimir Putin said, “A very happy and solemn event is taking place now – we are unveiling a monument to the prominent son of East, to the prominent son of Azerbaijan – poet and thinker Nizami. The head of the Iranian Philology Department and the dean of the Oriental Faculty of St. Petersburg State University I. M. Steblin-Kamensky, speaking of this monument characterises the description of Nizami as an Azerbaijani poet as a fruit of nationalist tendencies and as an “outright falsification”.

== Architecture ==
The bronze 5 meter sculpture of the poet was made in an oriental style. Nizami Ganjavi is portrayed sitting on a bench under an arch, in the Eastern attire, with a book in hand. Words “Nizami Ganjavi” (Azerbaijani: Nizami Gəncəvi) is written on the pedestal in Azerbaijani.

== See also ==
- Campaign on granting Nizami the status of the national poet of Azerbaijan
