= Maktabi =

Maktabi is a surname.

There was a Maktabi family rooted in Iran during the years 1600–1800. The Maktabi family in Persia included teachers that ran schools in Isfahan. They moved from Isfahan to Damascus in the late 1800s and started trading in antiques and rugs. In the early 1900s, members of the family moved to Beirut, Lebanon where they prospered as carpet merchants.

Notable people with the surname include:

- Malek Maktabi (born 1981), Lebanese journalist and television presenter
- Nayla Tueni Maktabi (born 1982), Lebanese journalist and politician, member of the Lebanese Parliament
- Rima Maktabi (born 1977), Lebanese journalist and television presenter
