= Asghar Seyed-Gohrab =

Iranian literary scholar

Ali-Asghar Seyed-Ghorab
- علی‌اصغر سیدغراب
- Born: 1968 (age 57–58); Tehran

Academic background
- Education: Leiden University (PhD)

Academic work
- Discipline: literary scholar
- Institutions: Utrecht University, Leiden University
- Website: https://www.persianstudies.nl/

Ali-Asghar Seyed-Ghorab (born 1968) is an Iranian literary scholar and Professor of Persian and Iranian Studies at Utrecht University. Previously, he was Associate Professor of Persian Language and Literature in the Department of Middle Eastern Studies at Leiden University. He was a fellow of the Young Academy of the Royal Netherlands Academy of Arts and Sciences. In 2023 he was elected a member of the Royal Netherlands Academy of Arts and Sciences.

== Books ==
- Gender and Sexuality in Persian Literary and Religious Traditions: Embodied Encounters, (ed.) Leiden: Leiden University Press, 2026.
- Dancing before God’s Beauty: Exploring Rūmī’s Poetic Universe, Mystical Philosophy and Reception History, (ed.) Berlin: De Gruyter, 2025.
- Sufi Non-Conformism: Antinomian Trends in the Persianate Cultural Traditions, (ed.) Leiden: Leiden University Press, 2024.
- Of Piety and Heresy: Abū Ḥāmid Muḥammad Ghazzālī’s Persian Treatises on Antinomians, Berlin: De Gruyter, 2024
- The Art of Teaching Persian Literature: From Theory to Practice, (eds.) Franklin Lewis, Asghar Seyed-Gohrab, Pouneh Shabani-Jadidi, Leiden / Boston: Brill, 2024.
- Martyrdom, Mysticism and Dissent: The Poetry of the 1979 Iranian Revolution and the Iran–Iraq War (1980–1988), Berlin: De Gruyter, 2021
- Pearls of Meanings: Studies on Persian Art, Poetry, Sufism and History of Iranian Studies in Europe by J.T.P. de Bruijn, (ed.) Leiden: Leiden University Press, 2020.
- The True Dream: Indictment of the Shiite Clerics of Isfahan, with S. McGlinn, Routledge, 2017
- Soefism: Een levende traditie, Prometheus / Bert Bakker, 2015
- Literature of the Early Twentieth Century: From the Constitutional Period to Reza Shah (ed.), I.B. Tauris 2015
- Layli and Majnun: Love, Madness and Mystic Longing in Nizami’s Epic Romance, Brill, 2003
- Mirror of Dew: The Poetry of Ālam-Tāj Zhāle Qā’em-Maqāmi, Harvard University Press, Ilex Foundation Series 14, 2015
- Metaphor and Imagery in Persian Poetry (ed.), Brill, 2012
- The Great Omar Khayyam: A Global Reception, (ed.), Leiden University Press, 2012
- Courtly Riddles: Enigmatic Embellishments in Early Persian Poetry, Leiden University Press, 2008, 2010
- The Treasury of Tabriz: the Great Il-Khanid Compendium, co-editor with S. McGlinn, Purdue University Press, 2007
- Gog and Magog: The Clans of Chaos in World Literature, with F. Doufikar-Aerts & S. McGlinn, Purdue University Press, 2007
- Conflict and Development in Iranian Film, co-editor with K. Talattof, Leiden University Press, 2013
