= Monument to Nizami Ganjavi in Baku =

Coordinates: 40.3696°N 49.8352°E

Monument to Nizami Ganjavi
- Interactive map of Monument to Nizami Ganjavi
- Location: Istiglaliyyat Street, Baku, Azerbaijan
- Type: Monument
- Completion date: 1949
- Dedicated to: Nizami Ganjavi

The Monument to Nizami Ganjavi, a medieval Azerbaijani poet, is located in Baku in Nizami Square, at the intersection of Istiglaliyyat, Ahmad Javad, Azerbaijan and Islam Safarli streets.

The opening ceremony of the monument was held in April 1949. The sculptor of the monument was Fuad Abdurahmanov, People’s Artist of Azerbaijan.

The monument is a 6-meter-high bronze statue installed on a 9-meter high octahedral pedestal. The pedestal is of red Labrador, and elements of Azerbaijani architecture of Nizami’s epoch were used in its handling. There is an ornamental carving and faced bronze plates on the lower part of the monument. Seven plates feature scenes from Nizami's works, and one plate displays a memorial inscription.
