= Fuad Abdurahmanov =

Azerbaijani monument sculptor

Fuad Əbdürəhmanov
- Born: 11 May 1915; Shaki, Azerbaijan, Russian Empire
- Died: 15 June 1971 (aged 56); Baku, Azerbaijan SSR, Soviet Union
- Known for: Sculptor, painter
- Awards: State Stalin Prize (1947, 1951), Orders of the Badge of Honour (1949, 1960), Gold medal of Academy of Arts of the USSR (1966)

Fuad Hasan oghlu Abdurahmanov (Azerbaijani: Fuad Həsən oğlu Əbdürəhmanov; May 11, 1915, in Nukha (Sheki), Azerbaijan, Russian Empire – June 15, 1971, in Baku, Azerbaijan SSR, Soviet Union) was an Azerbaijani monumental sculptor. He received many awards, including the title of Honored Worker of Arts of the Azerbaijan SSR (1943), People's Artist of the Azerbaijan SSR (1955), becoming the first Azerbaijani to be elected a corresponding member of the Academy of Arts of the USSR (1949), and was a two-time Laureate of the State Stalin Prize (1947 and 1951).

== Biography ==
Fuad Abdurahmanov was born on May 11, 1915, in Nukha (Sheki). He was born into the family of Hasan Jafar oglu Abdurahmanov, a local civil servant.

In 1929, Abdurahmanov’s family moved to Yevlakh and later relocated to Baku. In Baku, the family rented a two-room apartment in Icheri Sheher, on Mammadyarov Street. That same year, he entered the Painting School of Baku. After beginning his studies in Baku, he later studied at the Academy of Arts in Saint Petersburg (1935–1940) under Matvey Genrikhovich Manizer.

In 1934, nineteen-year-old Fuad Abdurahmanov’s composition, "Shot", was exhibited at an exhibition marking the 100th anniversary of the poet Ferdowsi. This work later became a permanent exhibit in the Azerbaijan State Museum of Art, named after Rustam Mustafayev. In 1938, Fuad Abdurahmanov began to work on a statue of Fuzûlî, which initiated a series of sculptures depicting eminent Azerbaijani poets and writers installed on the Nizami Museum’s loggia in Baku.

In the late 1930s, a competition was announced for a portrait and monument of Nizami Ganjavi to mark the 800th anniversary of his birth. As a result of the competition, the project was awarded to Fuad Abdurahmanov, along with architects Sadig Dadashov and Mikayil Huseynov.

In 1947, he was awarded the USSR-Stalin State Prize for the first time. In 1949, a monument to Nizami was erected in Baku. This monument became one of his most significant works and had a lasting influence on the development of monumental art in Azerbaijan. Both the monument and its pedestal were designed in balanced proportions of 1:1.5, shaping the architectural appearance of an important public square in Baku.

The sculptor's creative interests were diverse, ranging from historical figures to contemporary cultural figures. This can be seen in his later works, which include images of Huseynbala Aliyev and Khidir Mustafayev (heroes of the USSR), poet Samad Vurgun, composers Uzeyir Hajibeyov and Asaf Zeynally, as well as historical portraits of Koroghlu, Javanshir and Babek. He also participated, along with Tokay Mammadov and Omar Eldarov, in a competition to design a monument to Avicenna for the city of Bukhara.

Fuad Abdurahmanov was the first Azerbaijani to become a corresponding member of the Academy of Arts of the USSR. He was one of the first sculptors in Azerbaijan to work with harder materials such as marble and bronze.

== Creative achievements ==
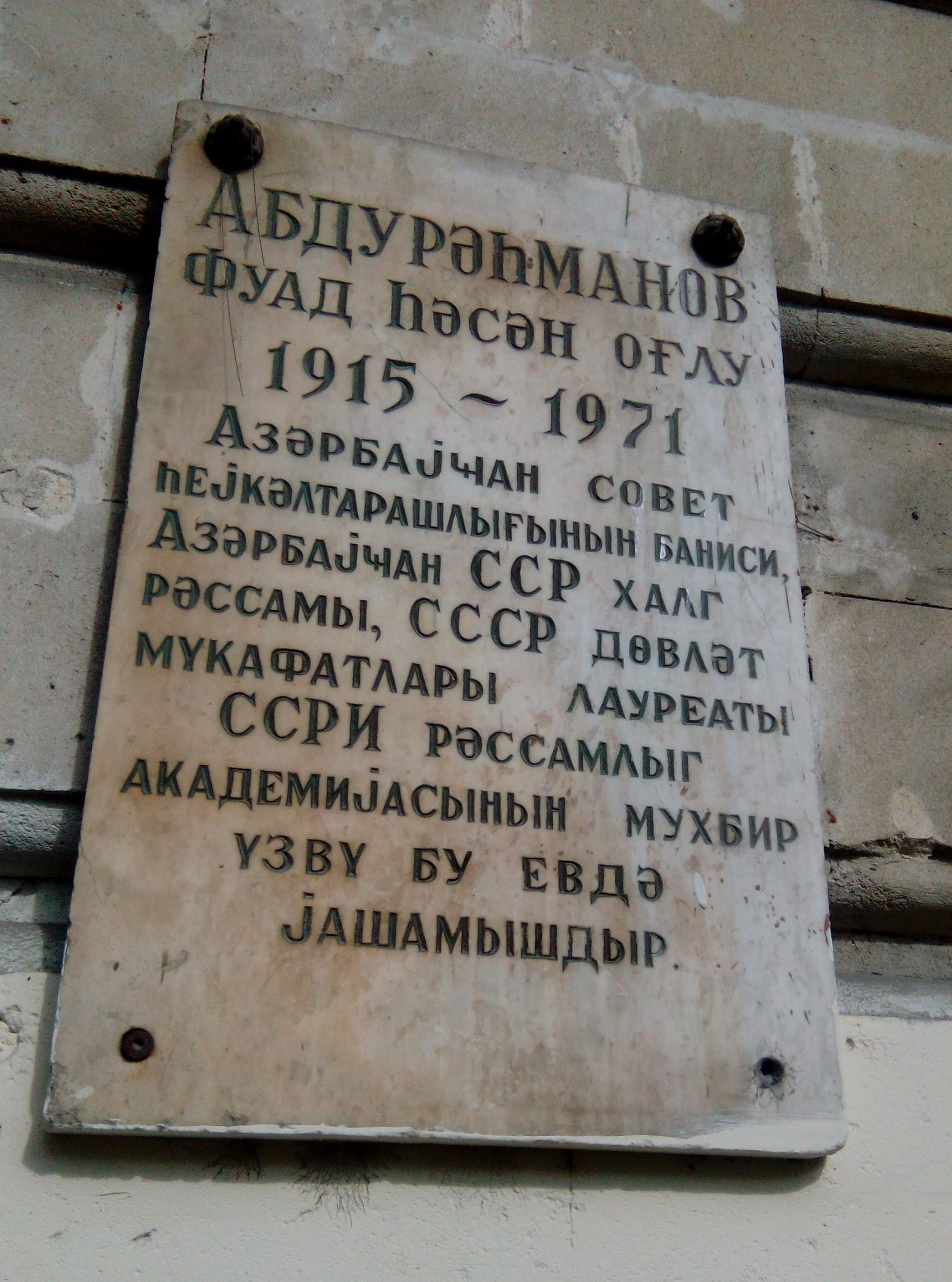
Plaque on the building where Azerbaijani sculptor Fuad Abdurahmanov lived in Baku, Azerbaijan

He created monuments to Nizami in Ganja (Stalin State Prize, 1947) and Baku (1949), the compositions “Sattar Bahlulzade” and “Rustam Mustafayev” (1947), the monument “Azad Gadin” ("Free Woman"), the monument to Mehdi Huseynzade in Baku, monumental busts of Choibalsan and Sukhbaatar (marble, 1954, burial vault in Ulan Bator), the monuments to poet Samad Vurghun in Baku (1961), to poet Rudaki in Dushanbe (Gold medal of Academy of Arts of the USSR, 1964), and the statues “Liberation” (Baku, 1960) and “Chaban” (gypsum, Stalin State Prize, 1951; bronze, 1951, Tretyakov Gallery). He made a portrait bust of V. I. Lenin (marble, 1955, Azerbaijan State Museum of History, Baku), among other works.

His works are distinguished by their richness and diversity of creative tendencies. Abdurahmanov began his creative development in the portrait genre by making bust portraits of cultural workers of Azerbaijan. His first monumental work, the monument to Fuzuli, was put up on the balcony of the Azerbaijan State Museum of Literature.

Fuad Abdurahmanov is the author of numerous monuments that decorate the streets and squares of Baku-Nizami, including monuments to Samed Vurghun, Mehdi Huseynzade, "Free Woman", and the gravestone of General Hazi Aslanov. He played a significant role in the formation and development of monumental and easel sculpture in Azerbaijan. According to one of the leading art critics of Azerbaijan, Jamila Novruzova, Fuad Abdurakhmanov is the founder of monumental sculpture in Azerbaijan. Streets in Baku and Shaki have been named after Fuad Abdurakhmanov, and memorial plaques have been installed on buildings where the sculptor lived. A school in Sheki was also named after him.

== Awards ==
- Stalin State Prize of the second degree (1947) for the monument to Nizami in Ganja (1946);
- Stalin State Prize of the third degree (1951) for the sculpture "Chaban";
- Gold Medal of Academy of Arts of the USSR (1966);
- Holder of two Orders of the Badge of Honour (1949, 1960).
