= Nizami Ganjavi =

Persian poet (c. 1141 – 1209)

- نظامی گنجوی
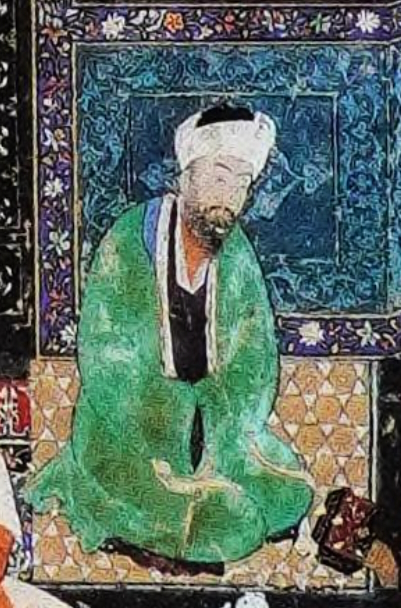
- Nezami (detail) Addressing his Son Mohammad. Attributed to Behzad, Leyli and Majnun, 1482.
- Born: c. 1141 (earlier date c. 1130 has also been suggested); Ganja, Seljuk Empire (modern-day Republic of Azerbaijan)
- Died: 1209 (aged 68–78); Ganja (Shirvanshah dynasty, modern-day Republic of Azerbaijan)
- Writing career
- Period: 12th century
- Genres: Romantic Persian epic poetry, Persian lyrical poetry, wisdom literature
- Notable work: Khamsa or Panj Ganj ('Five Treasures')

Nizami Ganjavi (Persian: نظامی گنجوی, romanized: Niẓāmī Ganjavī, lit. 'Niẓāmī of Ganja'; c. 1141 – 1209), Nizami Ganje'i, Nizami, or Nezāmi, whose formal name was Jamal ad-Dīn Abū Muḥammad Ilyās ibn-Yūsuf ibn-Zakkī, was a 12th-century poet. Nizami is considered the greatest romantic epic poet in Persian literature, who brought a colloquial and realistic style to the Persian epic. His heritage is widely appreciated in Afghanistan, Republic of Azerbaijan, Iran, the Kurdistan region and Tajikistan.

== Life ==
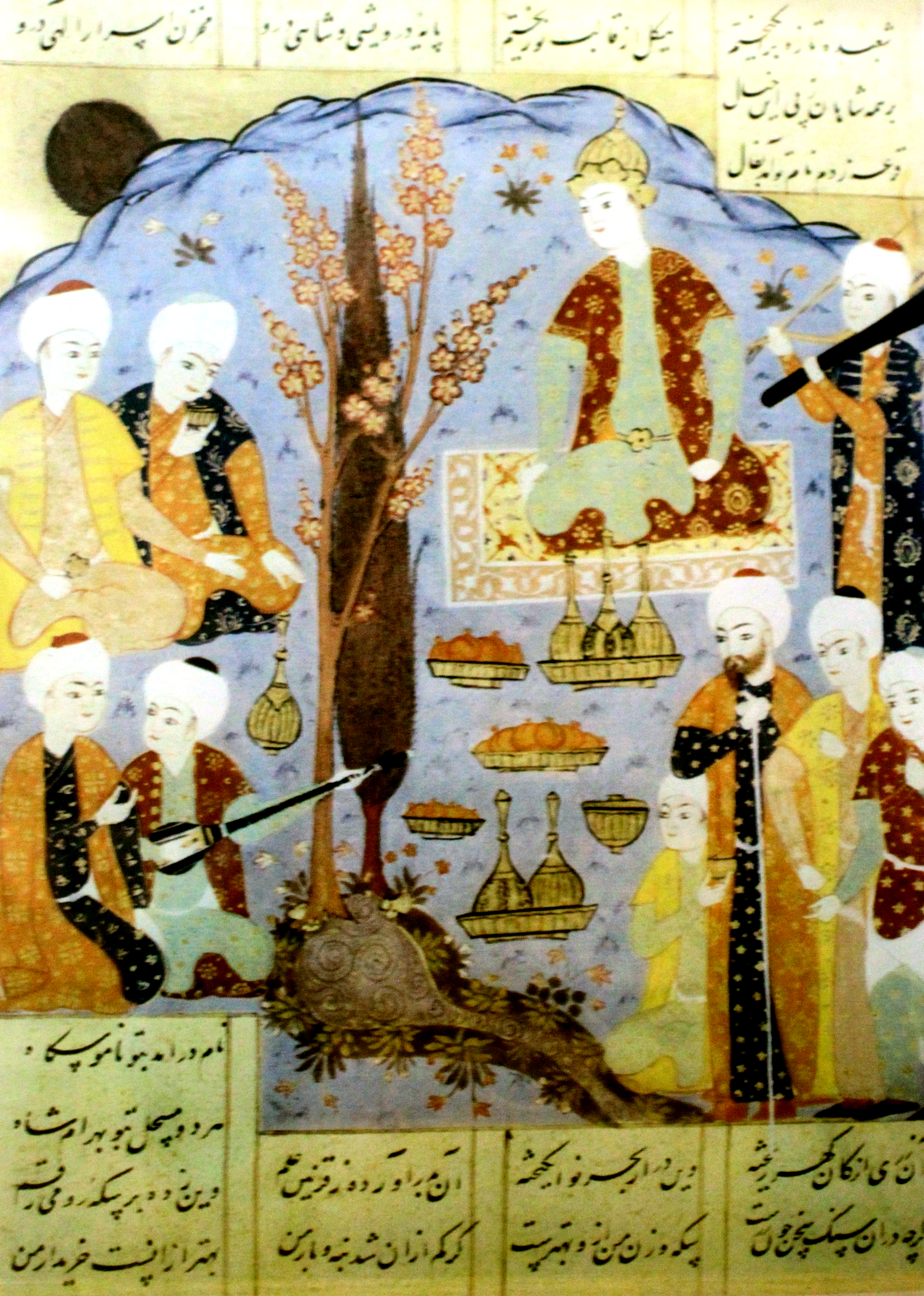
Nizami Ganjavi at shah's reception. Miniature. 1570. Museum of History of Azerbaijan

Born into a Persian family, his personal name was Ilyas and his chosen pen-name was Nizami (also spelled Nezami). He was born of an urban background in Ganja (Seljuq empire, now Republic of Azerbaijan) and is believed to have spent his whole life in the South Caucasus. According to De Blois, Ganja had a predominantly Iranian population at the time. The Armenian historian Kirakos Gandzaketsi (c. 1200 – 1271) mentions that "This city [Ganja] was densely populated with Iranians and a small number of Christians". Because Nizami was not a court poet, he does not appear in the annals of the dynasties. Tazkerehs, which are the compilations of literary memoirs that include maxims of the great poets along with biographical information and commentary of styles, refer to him briefly. Much of this material in these tazkerehs are based on legends, anecdotes, and hearsays. Consequently, few facts are known about Nizami's life, the only source being his own work, which does not provide much information on his personal life.

=== Parents ===
Nizami was orphaned early and was raised by his maternal uncle Khwaja Umar, who took responsibility for him and afforded him an excellent education. His mother, named Ra'isa, was of Kurdish origin. His father, whose name was Yusuf is mentioned once by Nizami in his poetry. In the same verse, Nizami mentions his grandfather's name as Zakki. In part of the same verse, some have taken the word Mu'ayyad as a title for Zakki while others have interpreted it as the name of his great-grandfather. Some sources have stated that his father might be possibly from Qom. Nizami is variously mentioned as a Persian and/or Iranian.

=== Family ===
Nizami was married three times. His first wife was an enslaved Kipchak who was sent to him by Fakhr al-Din Bahramshah, the ruler of Darband, as part of a larger gift. According to Iraj Bashiri she became Nizami's "most beloved" wife. His only son Mohammad was from this wife. She died after "Khosrow and Shirin" was completed. Mohammad was seven at the time. Nizami mentions his son again in Layli and Majnun adding that now this son is 14 years old and "apple of my eyes". In "Haft Peykar" (Seven Beauties), he also mentions and advises his son about taking more responsibility as the father was growing more frail.

Some modern writers in the late 20th century have claimed that this wife was called Afaq. Vahid Dastgerdi seems to be the first writer to propose this name for Nizami's first wife, but Said Nafisi (at the same time) and a recent source have challenged this interpretation of the corresponding verse in Nizami's work and the assumption that Afaq was the real name of his wife and have taken the Afaq in that verse to simply mean "horizon" rather than a proper name. Strangely enough, Nizami's two other wives, too, died prematurely – the death of each coinciding with the completion of an epic, prompting the poet to say, "God, why is it that for every mathnavi I must sacrifice a wife!".

== Education ==
Nizami was not a philosopher in the sense of Avicenna or an expositor of theoretical Sufism in the sense of Ibn 'Arabi. However, he is regarded as a philosopher and gnostic who mastered various fields of Islamic thoughts which he synthesized in a way that brings to mind the traditions of later Hakims such as Qutb al-Din Shirazi.

Often referred to by the honorific Hakim ("the Sage"), Nizami is both a learned poet and master of a lyrical and sensuous style. About Nizami's prodigious learning, there is no doubt. Poets were expected to be well versed in many subjects, but Nizami seems to have been exceptionally so. His poems show that not only he was fully acquainted with Arabic and Persian literatures and with oral and written popular and local traditions, but was also familiar with such diverse fields as mathematics, astronomy, astrology, alchemy, medicine, botany, Koranic exegesis, Islamic theory and law, Iranian myths and legends, history, ethics, philosophy and esoteric thought, music, and the visual arts. His strong character, social sensibility, and knowledge of oral and written historical records, as well as his rich Persian cultural heritage unite pre-Islamic and Islamic Iran into the creation of a new standard of literary achievement. Being a product of the Iranian culture of the time, he not only created a bridge between pre-Islamic and Islamic Iran, but also between Iran and the whole ancient world.

== Influences and literary scene ==
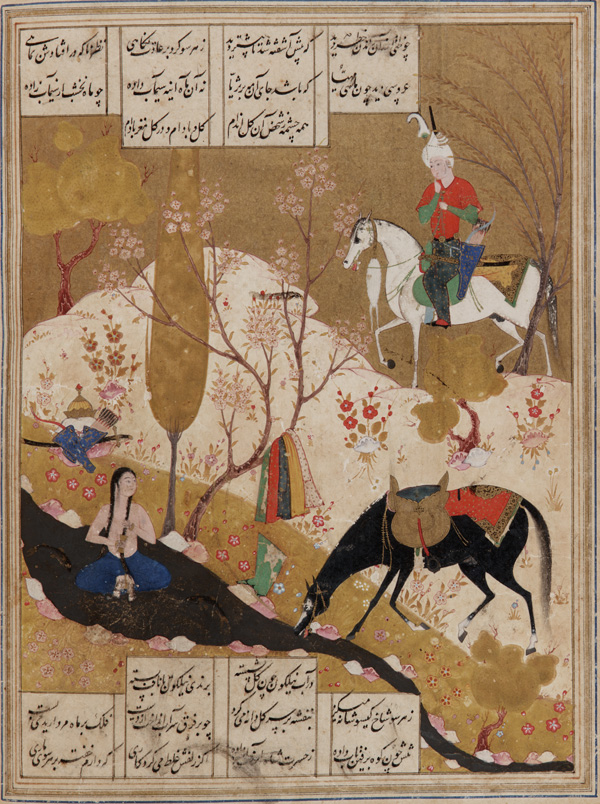
Khosrow Parviz discovers Shirin bathing in a pool. Nizami's poems in a Persian miniature, created in ca. 1550 in Shiraz, Persia. Collection of Freer Gallery of Art

The recent discovery and publication of the anthology titled Nozhat al-Majales contains Persian language quatrains from Nizami and 115 other poets from the northwestern Iran (Arrān, Sharvān, Azerbaijan; including 24 poets from Ganja alone) during the same era. Unlike other parts of Persia, where the poets mostly belonged to higher echelons of society such as scholars, bureaucrats, and secretaries, a good number of poets in the northwestern areas rose from among the common people with working-class backgrounds, and they frequently used colloquial expressions in their poetry. Accordingly, the book demonstrates the social conditions at the time, reflecting the full spread of Persian language and the culture in the region, which is evidenced by the common use of spoken idioms in poems and the professions of many of the poets. The influence of the northwestern Pahlavi language, for example, which had been the spoken dialect of the region, is clearly observed in the poems contained in this anthology. However, at the same time, the Caucasus region was entertaining a unique mixture of ethnic cultures. Khaqani's mother was a Nestorian Christian, Mojir Baylqani's mother was an Armenian, and Nizami's mother was a Kurd. Their works reflect the cultural and linguistic diversity of the region.

By the end of the 10th century, Persian literature became widespread from the eastern Mediterranean to the banks of the Indus. The earliest extant example of Persian poetry from the area is that of Qatran Tabrizi (1009–1072) who served in the courts of the Shaddadid and Rawadid dynasties. Qatran Tabrizi, is credited with what some scholars in the last century have termed as the founder of the "Azerbaijan" or "Trans-Cacausian" school or "Tabriz School" or "Shirvan School" or "Arranian Style" of Persian poetry. This school produced a distinctive style of poetry in Persian, which contrasted with "Khurasani" ("Eastern") style in its rhetorical sophistication, its innovative use of metaphor, its use of technical terminology and Christian imagery, the presence of Persian archaism while borrowing from Arabic vocabulary, as well as new concepts. Other sources including the Encyclopaedia of Islam and traditional Iranian literary sources have used the term "'Iraqi" style for the Persian poetry of Nizami.

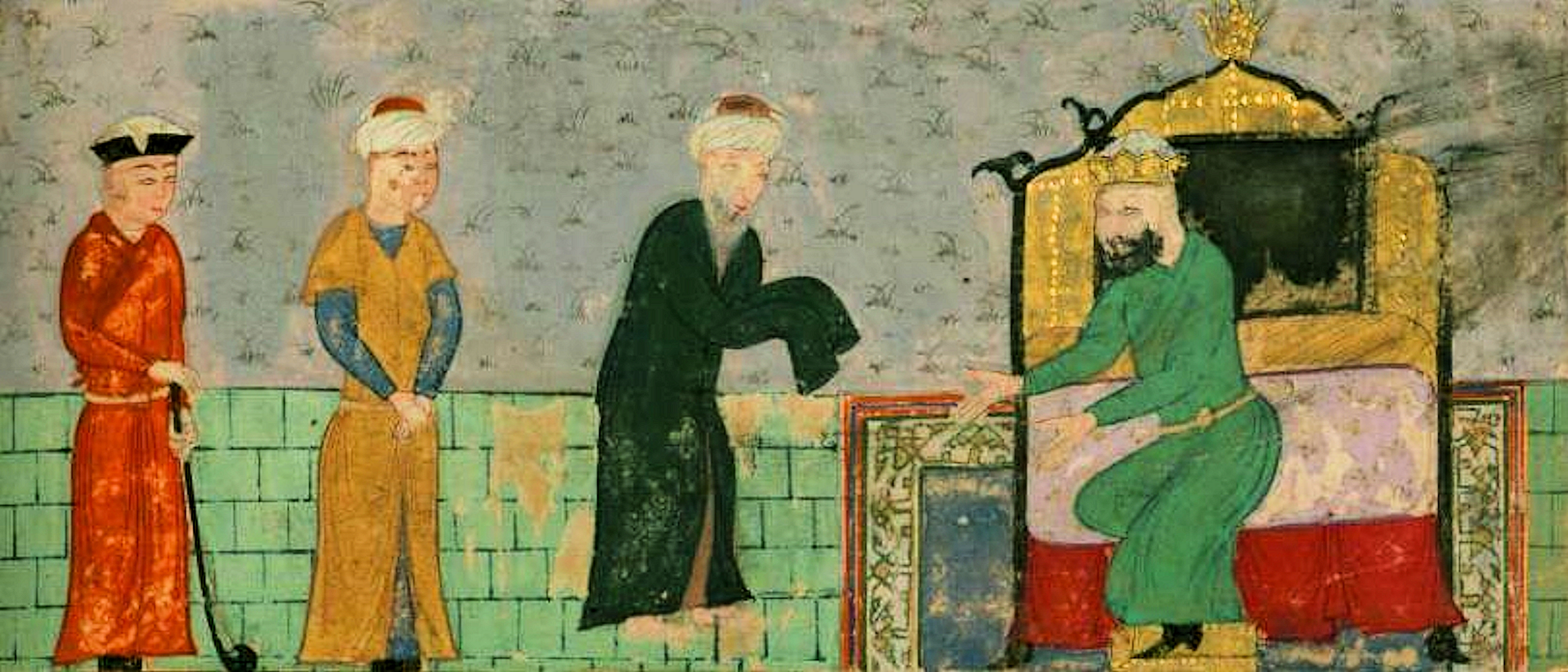
Atabeg of Azerbaijan Qizil Arslan welcomes Nizami

The Seljuqs took control of Ganja from the Shaddadids in 1075 and spread Persian literary westwards to their courts. In the middle of the 12th century, the Seljuk Empire's control of the region weakened and their provincial governors, virtually autonomous local princes, further encouraged Persian culture, art and poetry in their courts. Persian culture characteristically flourished in this era, when political power was diffused and Persian remained the primary language, Persian civil servants and merchants were in great demand and rival dynasties continued to vie for the service of Persian poets. This was especially true in Ganjeh, the Caucasian outpost town where Nizami lived. Nizami was patronized by different rulers and dedicated his epics to various rival dynasties, including the Seljuqs, Eldiguzids (who maintained control of Ganja during most of the later 12th century), Shirvanshahs, the ruler of Ahar and Ahmadilis. Although he enjoyed the patronage of various rulers and princes, he avoided the courts and is generally believed to have lived a secluded life. Since he was not a court poet, he does not appear in the annals of the dynasties, which list the names of events of the ruling families.

According to literary scholar Chelkowski, "it seems that Nizami's favorite pastime was reading Ferdowsi's monumental epic Shahnameh (The book of Kings)." Nizami mentioned Ferdowsi as the Sage (hakim) and Knower/Wise (dānā) and the great master of discourse, "who has decorated words like new bride." Nizami advises the son of the Shirvanshah to read the Shahnameh and to remember the meaningful sayings of the wise. Nizami used the Shahnameh as a source in his three epics of Haft Peykar, Khosrow and Shirin and Eskandar-Nameh.

The story of Vis and Ramin also had an immense influence on Nizami. Although Nizami takes the bases for most of his plots from Ferdowsi, but the basis for his rhetoric comes from Gorgani. This is especially noticeable in Khosrow and Shirin, which is of the same meter and imitates some scenes from Vis and Ramin. Nizami's concern with astrology also has a precedent in an elaborate astrological description of the night sky in Vis and Ramin. Nizami had a paramount influence on the romantic tradition, and Gorgani can be said to have initiated much of the distinctive rhetoric and poetic atmosphere of this tradition, with the absence of the Sufi influences, which are seen in Nizami's epic poetry.

The first monumental work of Nizami, the Makhzan al-Asrar is influenced by Sanai's Hadikat al-Hakika. Nizami acknowledges this, but considers his work to be superior. The main similarities between Sanai's poem and Nizami's are in its ethico-philosophical genre, although Nizami uses a different metre and organized the whole work in a different fashion. Khaqani Sherwani daring imagery, was to have a momentous influence on Nizami Ganjavi and through the latter on Persian poetry in general.

== Works ==
Nizami lived in an age of both political instability and intense intellectual activity, which his poems reflect, but little is known about his life, his relations with his patrons, or the precise dates of his works, as the many legends built up around the poet color the accounts of his later biographers. He dedicated his poems to various rulers of the region as was the custom of that time for great poets, but avoided court life. Nizami was a master of the masnavi style (double-rhymed verses).

=== The Khamsa or Panj Ganj ===
Nizami's main poetical work, for which he is best known, is a set of five long narrative poems known as the Khamsa (خمسه, 'Quintet or Quinary') or Panj Ganj (پنج گنج, 'Five Treasures'):

- Makhzan-ol-Asrâr (مخزن‌الاسرار, 'The Treasury or Storehouse of Mysteries'), 1163 (some date it 1176)
- Khosrow o Shirin (خسرو و شیرین, 'Khosrow and Shirin'), 1177–1180
- Leyli o Majnun (لیلی و مجنون, 'Layla and Majnun'), 1192
- Eskandar-Nâmeh (اسکندرنامه, 'The Book of Alexander'), 1194 or 1196–1202
- Haft Peykar (هفت پیکر, 'The Seven Beauties'), 1197

The first of these poems, Makhzan-ol-Asrâr, was influenced by Sanai's (d. 1131) monumental Garden of Truth. The four other poems are medieval romances. Khosrow and Shirin, Bahram-e Gur, and Alexander the Great, who all have episodes devoted to them in Ferdowsi's Shahnameh, appear again here at the center of three of four of Nizami's narrative poems. The adventure of the paired lovers, Layla and Majnun, is the subject of the second of his four romances, and derived from Arabic sources. In all these cases, Nizami reworked the material from his sources in a substantial way.

The Khamsa was a popular subject for lavish manuscripts illustrated with painted miniatures at the Persian and Mughal courts in later centuries. Examples include the Khamsa of Nizami (British Library, Or. 12208), created for the Mughal Emperor Akbar in the 1590s.

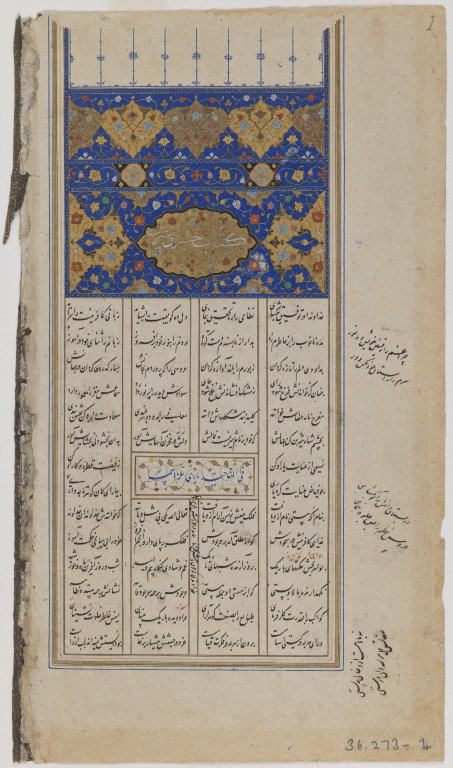
Page from an Illustrated Manuscript of the "Khamsa" by Nizami. Brooklyn Museum.

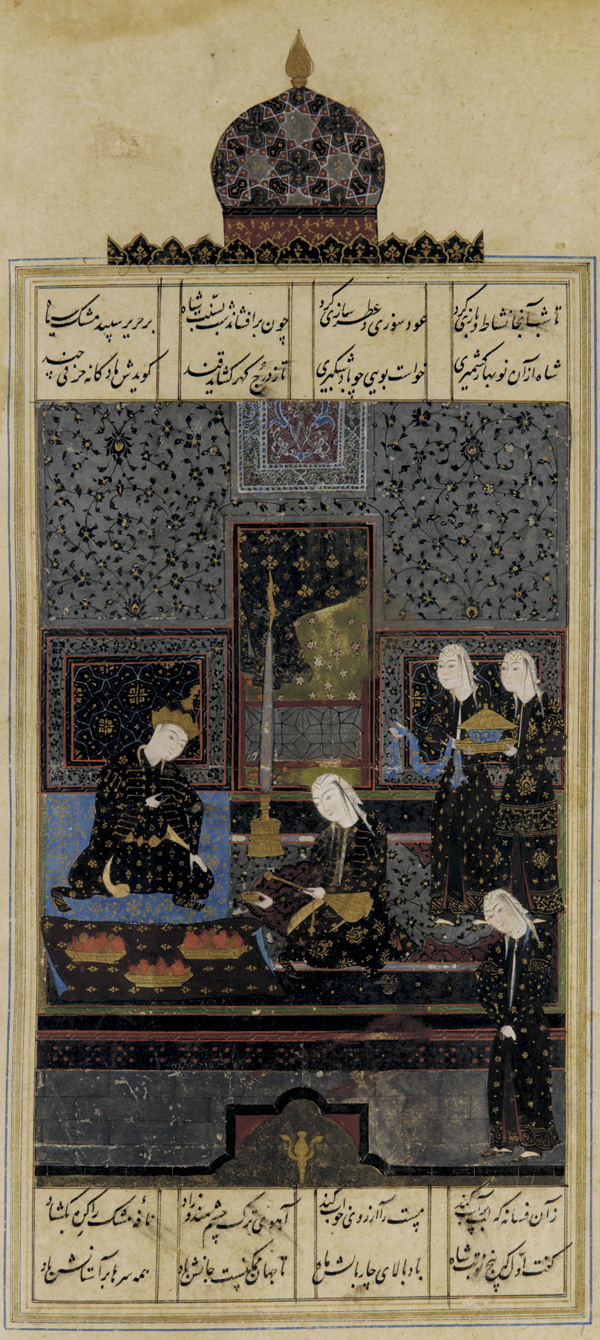
Sassanid king, Bahram Gur is a great favourite in Persian tradition and poetry. Depiction of Nizami's "Bahram and the Indian Princess in the Black Pavilion", Khamsa, mid-16th century Safavid era.

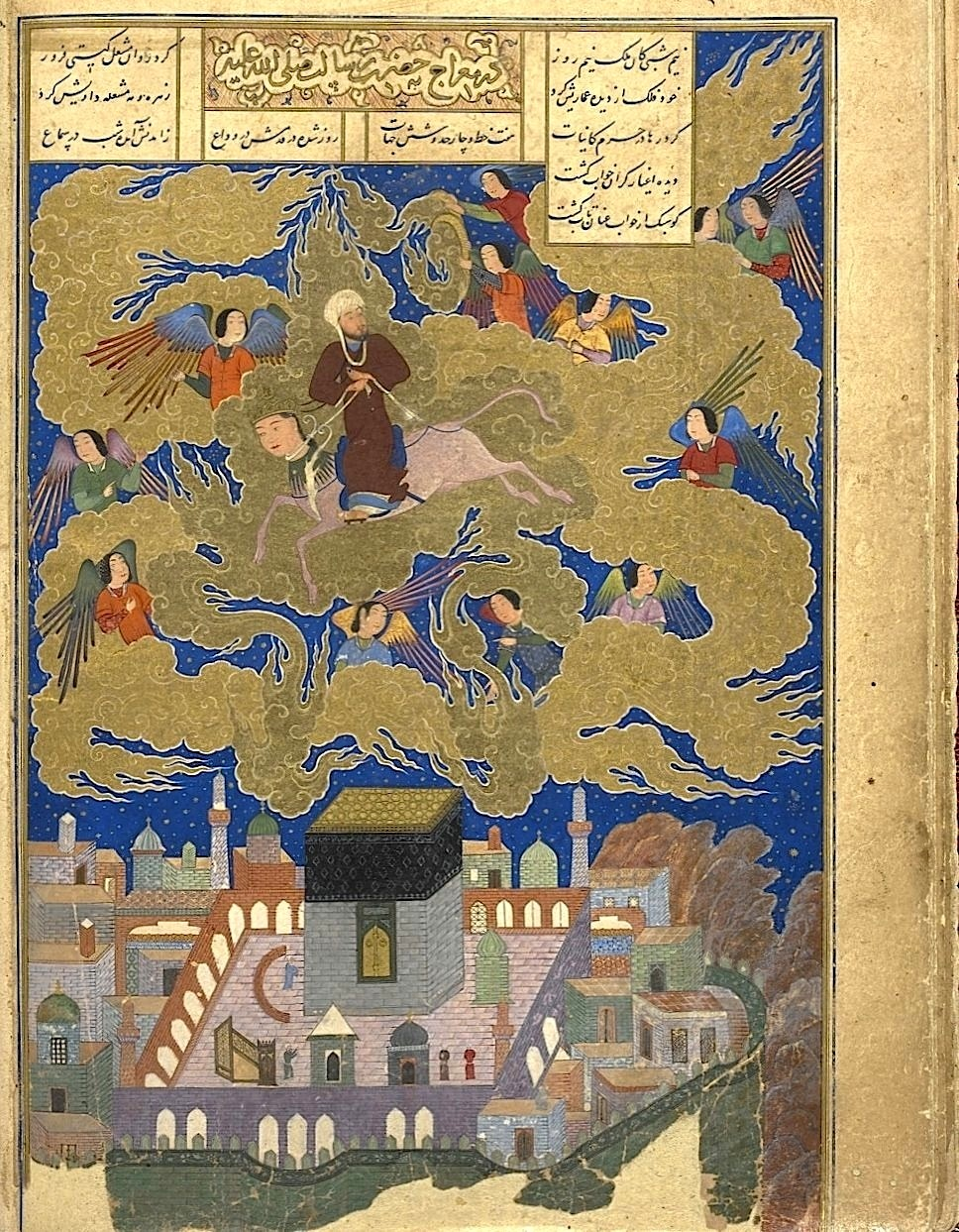
A manuscript from Nizami's Khamsa dated 1494, depicting Muhammad's journey from Mecca to the Dome of the Rock to heaven. The archangel Gabriel is seen to Muhammad's right with multiple wings.

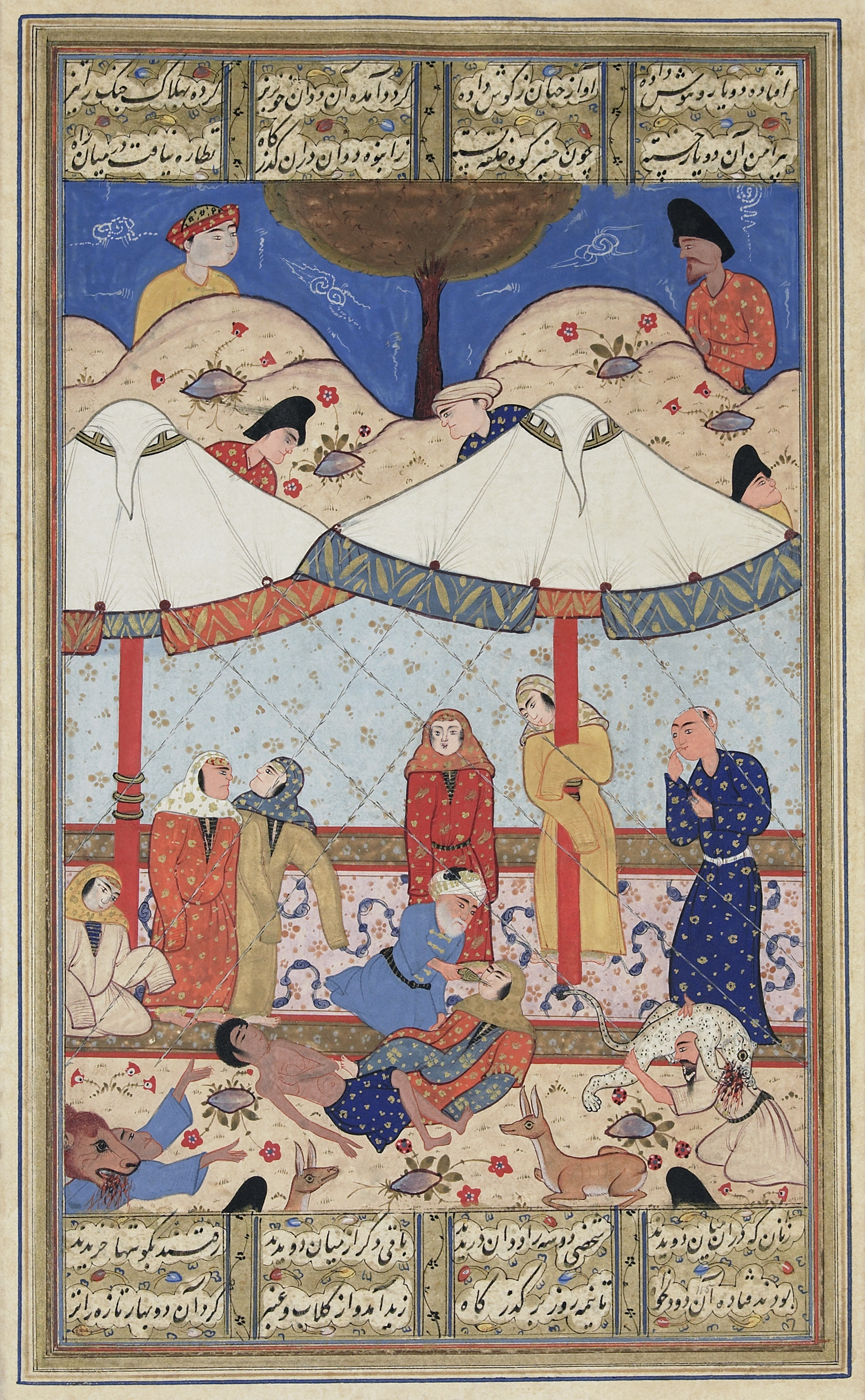
A scene from the romance Layla and Majnun. The thwarted lovers meet for the last time before their deaths. Both have fainted and Majnun's elderly messenger attempts to revive Layla while wild animals protect the pair from unwelcome intruders. Late 16th-century illustration.

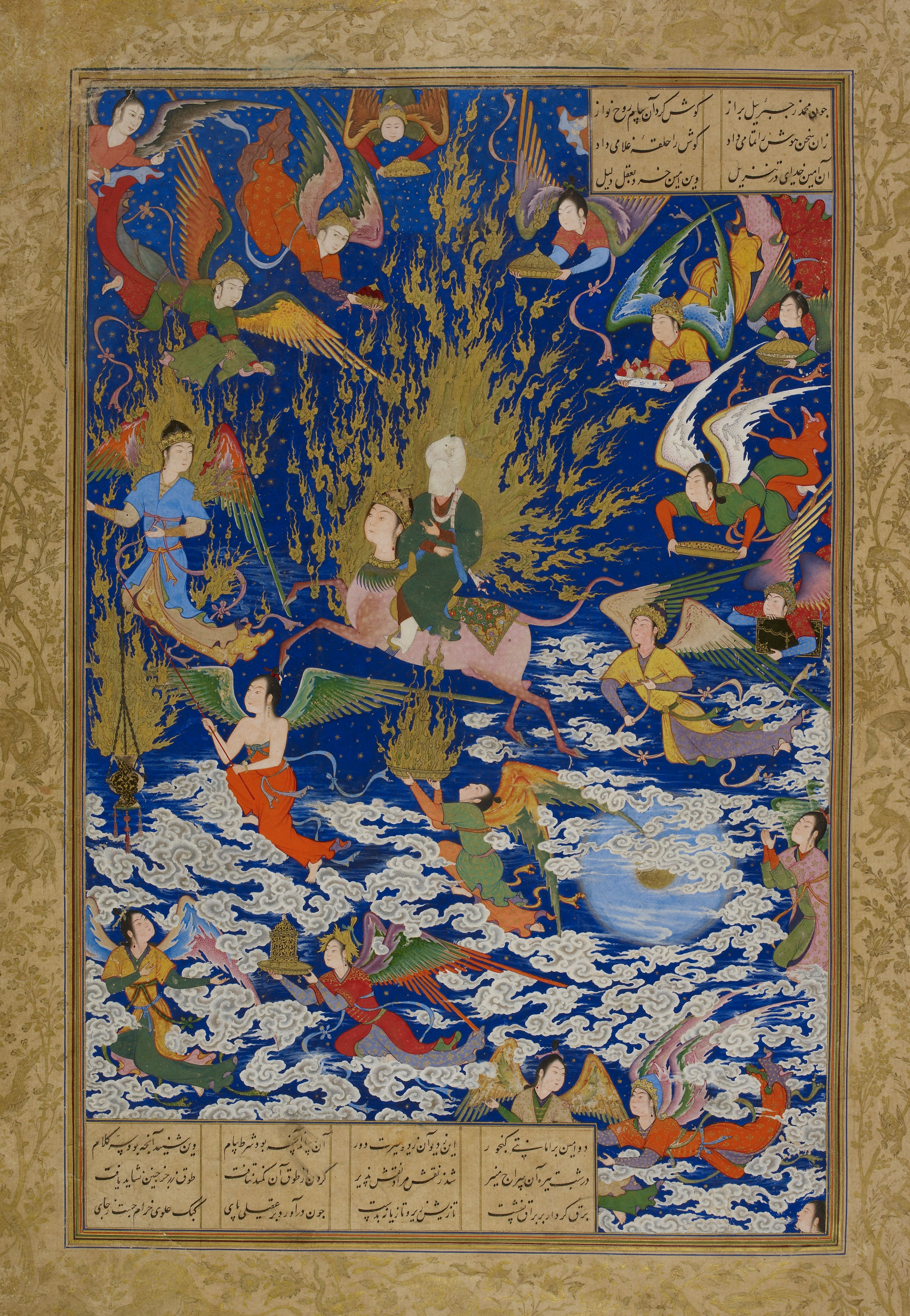
1543 illustration of the Mi'raj from the Khamsa, probably created by the court painter Sultan Muhammad. This version was created for the Persian Shah Tahmasp I.

==== Makhzan-ol-Asrâr ====
The ethico-philosophical poems of about 2,250 Persian distichs were dedicated to Fakhr al-Din Bahramshah, the ruler of Erzinjan. The story deals with such esoteric subjects as philosophy and theology. The story contains twenty discourses, each of them portraying an exemplary story on religious and ethical topics. Each chapter concludes with apostrophe to the poet himself containing his pen name. The content of the poems are indicated in the heading to each chapter and are written in a typical Homiletics style. The stories which discuss spiritual and practical concerns enjoin kingly justice, riddance of hypocrisy, warning of vanity of this world and the need to prepare for the after-life. The general message of the discourse is that Nizami preaches the ideal way of life drawing attention to his reader of the supreme rank man among God's creatures and approaching of the end life and the necessity of man becoming aware of his spiritual destination. In a few chapters he address the duties of a king, but as a whole, he addresses himself to mankind in general rather than to his royal patrons. In the introduction, the poet provides an account of his solitary vigils, called Khalwat. There is no indication that these were Sufi vigils, but they are used as a literary fantasy on the spiritually inclined poet he wanted to be. In highly rhetorical style, the aim he pursues is to transcend the limitation of secular literature of the courts. With this work, Nizami joins the destination of Persian poetry, which had started with Sanai and was continued by others, in the first place by Attar.

Not a romantic epic, "The Treasury of Mysteries" was translated into English by Gholam H. Darab in 1945. After this early work, Nizami turned towards narrative poetry.

==== Khosrow o Shirin ====
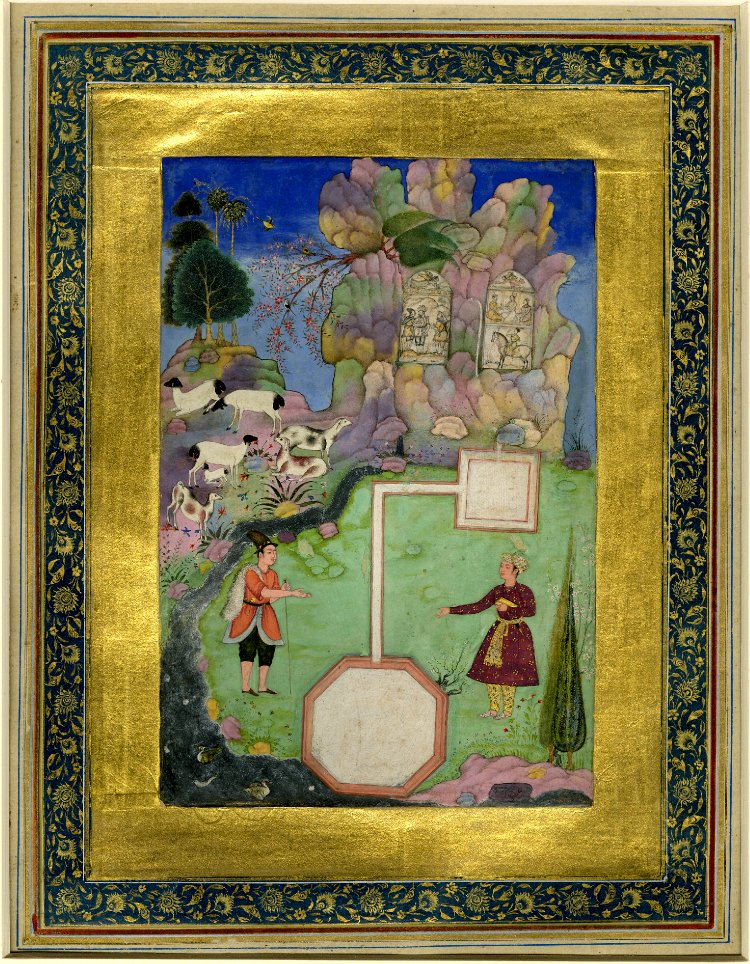
Khusrau stand on either side of the canal built to supply Shirin with the milk of goats and cows, taken from the Khamsa of Nizami

A story of pre-Islamic Persian origin which is found in the great historical epic poems of the Shahnameh and is based on a true story that was further romanticized by Persian poets. The story chosen by Nizami, was commissioned and dedicated to the Seljuk Sultan Toghril II, the Atabek Muhammad ibn Eldiguz Jahan Pahlavan and his brother Qizil Arslan. It contains about 6,500 distichs in length, the story depicts the love of Sasanian Khosrow II Parviz towards his Armenian princess Shirin. Khusrow and Shirin recounts the story of King Khosrow's courtship of Princess Shirin, and the vanquishing of his love-rival, Farhad. The story has a complex structure with several genres exploited simultaneously; and contains many verbal exchanges and letters, all imbued with lyrical intensity. Khosrow endures long journeys, physical and spiritual, before returning to Shirin, his true love. They are eventually married, but finally Khosrow is killed by his son and Shirin commits suicide over the body of her murdered husband. Pure and selfless love is represented here embodied in the figure of Farhad, secretly in love with Shirin, who falls victim to the king's ire and jealousy.

The influence of Vis o Rāmin is visible as the poem imitates a major scene (that of the lovers arguing in the snow) from Vis o Rāmin, as well as being in the same meter (hazaj) as Gorgāni's poem. Nizami's concern with astrology also has a precedent in an elaborate astrological description of the night sky in Vis o Rāmin. In turn, Nizami's great work had a tremendous influence on later authors and many imitations of this work were made. With complete artistic and structural unity, the epic of Khosrow o Shirin turned to be a turning point not only for Nizami but for all of Persian literature.

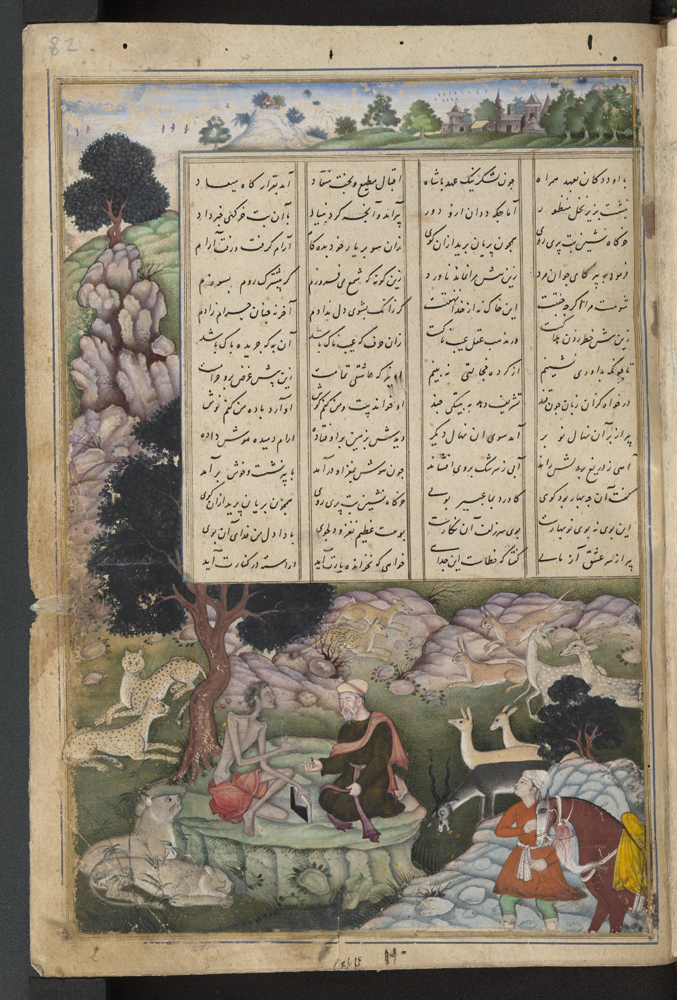
Salīm conversing with Majnun in the desert. Nizami's text illustrated with a miniature painting from a late 16th-century Indian book

==== Leyli o Majnun ====
A story of Arabic origin which was later adapted and embellished by the Persians. The poem of 4,600 distichs was dedicated, in 1192, to Abu al-Muzaffar Shirvanshah, who claimed descent from the Sasanian King, whose exploits are reflected in Nizami's Haft Paykar (Seven Beauties). The poem is based on the popular Arab legend of ill-starred lovers: the poet Qays falls in love with his cousin Layla, but is prevented from marrying her by Layla's father. Layla's father forbids contact with Qays, so that Qays becomes obsessed and starts singing of his love for Layla in public. The obsession becomes so severe that he sees and evaluates everything in terms of Layla; hence his sobriquet "the possessed" (Majnun). Realizing that he cannot obtain union, even when other people intercede for him, he leaves society and roams naked in the desert among the beasts. However, the image of Layla was so ingrained in him that he cannot eat or sleep. His only activity becomes composing poetry of longing for Layla. Meanwhile, Layla is married against her will, but she guards her virginity by resisting the advances of her husband. In a secret meeting with Majnun, they meet, but have no physical contact. Rather, they recite poetry to each other from a distance. Layla's husband dies eventually, which removes the legal obstacles to a licit union. However Majnun is so focused on the ideal picture of Layla in his mind, that he fled into the desert again. Layla dies out of grief and is buried in her bridal dress. Hearing this news, Majun rushes to her grave, where he instantly dies. They are buried side by side and their grave becomes a site of pilgrimage. Someone dreams that in Paradise they are united and live as a king and queen.

Nizami composed his romance at the request of the Shirvanshah Akhsatan. Initially, he doubted that this simple story about the agony and pain of an Arab boy wandering in rough mountains and burning deserts would be a suitable subject for royal court poetry and his cultured audience. It was his son who persuaded him to undertake the project, saying: "wherever tales of love are read, this will add spice to them". Nizami used many Arabic anecdotes in the story, but also adds a strong Persian flavor to the legend.

An important aspect of Layla and Majun is the poet's highly humanitarian approach. During the war by Nawfal in favor of Majnun, the latter is unhappy, wishing the termination of the war. Majun gives away his horse and amours to save a gazelle and a stag.

Nizami gave a Persian character to the poem by adding several techniques borrowed from the Persian epic tradition, such as the portrayal of characters, the relationship between characters, description of time and setting, etc. Further, he adapted the different stories about Majnun to fit a well-crafted Persian romantic epic.

The Story of Layla and Majnun by Nizami, was edited and translated into English by Swiss scholar of Islamic culture Rudolf Gelpke and published in 1966. A comprehensive analysis in English containing partial translations of Nizami's romance Layla and Majnun examining key themes such as chastity, constancy and suffering through an analysis of the main characters was published by Ali Asghar Seyed-Gohrab.

==== Eskandar-Nâmeh ====
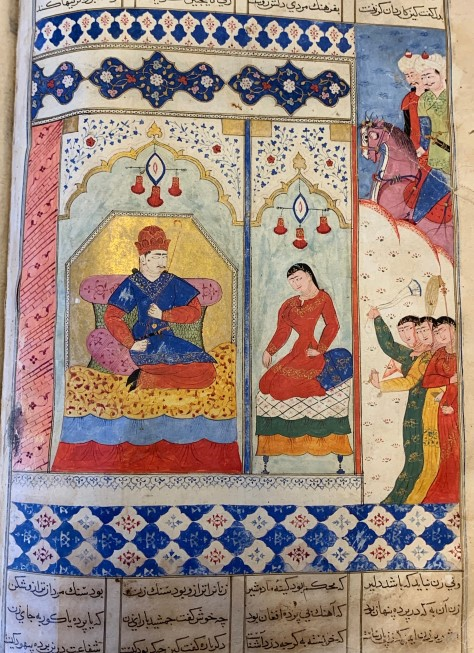
Alexander sharing his throne with Queen Nushabah, taken from the Sharaf-Nama owned by the Sultan of Bengal Nasiruddin Nasrat Shah. (British Library)

The Iskandarnameh of Nizami contains 10,500 distichs. There are differences of opinion on whether this or the Haft Paykar was Nizami's last epic. The names of its dedicatees are uncertain, but the ruler of Ahar, Nosart al-Din Bishkin b. Mohammad has been mentioned. The story is based on Islamic myths developed about Alexander the Great, which derive from Qur'anic references to the Dhu'l-Qarnayn as well as from the Alexander romance of Pseudo-Callisthenes. It consists of two books, Sharaf-Nama and Iqbal-nameh. The poem narrates the three stages in Alexander's life: first as the conqueror of the world; then as a seeker after knowledge, gaining enough wisdom to acknowledge his own ignorance; and finally as a prophet, traveling once again across the world, from west to east, and south to north to proclaim his monotheistic creed to the world at large. The Sharaf-nama discusses the birth of Alexander, his succession to the throne of Rum (Greece), his wars against Africans who invaded Egypt, his conquest of Persia and his marriage to the daughter of Darius. The episode also discusses Alexander's pilgrimage to Mecca, his stay in the Caucasus and his visit to Queen Nushaba of Barda' and her court of Amazons. Alexander conquers India, China and the land of the Rus. The Sharafnama concludes with Alexander's unsuccessful search for the water of immortal life.

The Iqbal-nameh is a description of Alexander's personal growth into the ideal ruler on a model ultimately derived, through Islamic intermediaries, from Plato's Republic. He has debates with Greek and Indian philosophers (cf. Garshaspnama) and a major portion of the text is devoted to the discourses he has with seven Greek sages. The poet then tells of Alexander's end and adds an account of the circumstances of the death of each of the seven sages. Nizami's image of Alexander is that of an Iranian knight.

An English translation of the Sharaf-Nama by Henry Wilberforce-Clarke was published in 1881 under the title Sikandar Nama e Bara and is available online.

==== Haft Peykar ====
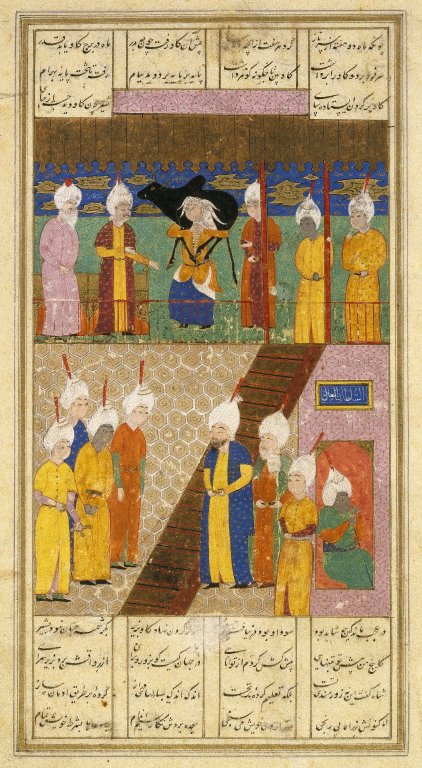
Practice Makes Perfect from a Haft Peykar of Nizami. Brooklyn Museum.

A pre-Islamic story of Persian origin, it was dedicated to the ruler of Maragha, Ala' al-Din Korp Arslan. It is a romanticized biography of Bahram V Gur, the Sassanid king, who is born to Yazdegerd after twenty years of childlessness and supplication to Ahura Mazda for a child. His adventurous life had already been treated by Ferdowsi in the Shahnameh, to which fact Nizami alludes a number of times. In general, his method is to omit those episodes that the earlier poet had treated, or to touch on them only very briefly, and to concentrate on new material. The poet starts by giving an account of the birth of Bahram Gur and his upbringing in the court of the Arab king No'man and his fabled palace Khwarnaq. Bahram whose upbringing is entrusted to No'man becomes a formidable huntsman. While wandering through the fabled palace, he discovers a locked room which contains a depiction of seven princesses, hence the name Haft Peykar (seven beauties). Each of these princesses is from the seven different climes (according to the traditional Zoroastrian-Islamic division of the Earth) and he falls in love with them. His father Yazdegerd I passes away, and Bahram returns to Persia to claim his throne from pretenders. After some episodes, he is recognized as King and rescues the Persians from a famine. Once the country is stable, the King searches for the seven princesses and wins them as his brides. His architect is ordered to construct seven domes for each of his new brides. The architect tells him that each of the seven climes is ruled by one of the seven planets (according to the classical planetary system of the Zoroastrian-Islamic world) and advises him to assure good fortune by adorning each dome with the color that is associated with each clime and planet. Bahram is skeptical but follows the advice of the architect. The princesses take up residence in the splendid pavilions. On each visit, the king visits the princesses on successive days of the week; on Saturday the Indian princess, who is governed by Saturn and so on. The princesses names are Furak (Nurak), the daughter of the Rajah of India, as beautiful as the moon; Yaghma Naz, the daughter of the Khaqan of the Turks; Naz Pari, the daughter of the king of Khwarazm; Nasrin Nush, the daughter of the king of the Slavs; Azarbin (Azareyon), the daughter of the king of Morocco; Humay, the daughter of the Roman Caesar; and Diroste (wholesome), a beautiful Iranian princess from the House of Kay Ka'us. Each princess relates to the king a story matching the mood of her respective color. These seven stories, characterized by François de Blois as "beautifully constructed [and] highly sensuous," make up about half of the entire poem. While the king is busy with the seven brides, his evil minister seizes power in the realm. Bahram Gur discovers that the affairs of Persia are in disarray, the treasury is empty, and the neighboring rulers are posed to invade. He clears his mind first by going hunting. After returning from the hunt, he sees a suspended dog from a tree. The owner of the dog, who was shepherd, tells the story of how his faithful watchdog had betrayed his flock to a she-wolf in return for sexual favors. He starts investigating the corrupt minister and from the multitude of complaints, he selects seven who tell him the injustice they have suffered. The minister is subsequently put to death and Bahram Gur restores justice and orders the seven pleasure-domes to be converted to fire temples for the pleasure of God. Bahram then goes hunting for the last time but mysteriously disappears. As a pun on words, while trying to hunt the wild ass (gūr) he instead finds his tomb (gūr).

Ritter, in his introduction to the critical edition, describes it as: "the best and most beautiful epic in New Persian poetry and at the same time [. . .] one of the most important poetical creations of the whole of oriental Indo-European literature". The Haft Peykar is considered the poet's masterpiece. Overall, Nizami illustrates the harmony of the universe, the affinity of the sacred and the profane, and the concordance of ancient and Islamic Iran.

The story was translated to English in 1924 by Charles Edward Wilson. A newer English rendering based on more complete manuscripts was accomplished by Julie Scott Meysami in 1995.

The following lines present an excerpt (Original Persian):

گوهر نیک را ز عقد مریز وآنکه بد گوهرست ازو بگریز
بدگهر با کسی وفا نکند اصل بد در خطا خطا نکند
اصل بد با تو چون شود معطی آن نخواندی که اصل لایخطی
کژدم از راه آنکه بدگهرست ماندنش عیب و کشتنش هنرست
هنرآموز کز هنرمندی در گشائی کنی نه در بندی
هرکه ز آموختن ندارد ننگ در برآرد ز آب و لعل از سنگ
وانکه دانش نباشدش روزی ننگ دارد ز دانش‌آموزی
ای بسا تیز طبع کاهل کوش که شد از کاهلی سفال فروش
وای بسا کور دل که از تعلیم گشت قاضی‌القضات هفت اقلیم

Translation:

Take not apart the good pearl from the string; from him who is of evil nature flee.
An evil nature acts consistently: have you not heard that Nature does not err?
The evil-natured man keeps faith with none; the erring nature does not fail to err.
The scorpion since it is by nature bad—to let it live's a fault, to kill it, good.
Seek knowledge, for through knowledge you effect that doors to you be opened and not closed.
He who shames not at learning can draw forth pearls from the water, rubies from the rock.
Whilst he to whom no knowledge is assigned—that person (you will find) ashamed to learn.
How many, keen of mind, in effort slack, sell pottery from lack of pearls (to sell)!
How many a dullard, through his being taught, becomes the chief judge of the Seven Climes!

— Translation by Wilson

=== Other poetry ===
Only a small corpus of his Persian lyric poetry, mainly qasidas ("odes") and ghazals ("lyrics") have survived. Ten of his quatrains have also been recorded in the anthology Nozhat al-Majales (which was compiled around 1250) by Jamal Khalil Shirvani along with 23 other poets from Ganja. A famous ghazal of Nizami talks about altruism as the path for reaching the ultimate spiritual goal:

I went to the Tavern last night, but I was not admitted

I was bellowing yet nobody was listening to me
Either none of the wine-sellers were awake
Or I was a nobody, and no one opened the door for a Nobody
When more or less half of the night had passed
A shrewd, perfect man (rind) raised his head from a booth and showed his face
I asked him: “to open the door”, he told me: “go away, do not talk nonsense!
At this hour, nobody opens door for anybody
This is not a mosque where its doors are open any moment
Where you can come late and move quickly to the first row
This is the Tavern of Magians and rinds dwell here
There are Beauties, candle, wine, sugar, reed flute and songs
Whatever wonders that exists, is present here
(in this tavern there are) Muslims, Armenians, Zoroastrian, Nestorians, and Jews
If you are seeking company of all that is found here
You must become a dust upon the feet of everyone in order to reach your (spiritual perfection) goal”
O Nezami! if you knock the ring on this door day and night

You won't find except smoke from this burning fire

== Legacy ==
Nizami Mausoleum in Ganja, Republic of Azerbaijan.

Nizami, whose works are all written in Persian, has a very high reputation in Iran, Afghanistan and Tajikistan, where Persian is the official language. His poetry is especially well known in Iran, and is also very popular in Azerbaijan, where his birthplace and mausoleum are located. He is known in other countries, especially in India and Pakistan.

=== Persian culture ===
The influence of Nizami's work on the subsequent development of Persian literature has been enormous and the Khamseh became a pattern that was emulated in later Persian poetry (and also in other Islamic literatures). The legacy of Nizami is widely felt in the Islamic world and his poetry has influenced the development of Persian, Arabic, Turkish, Kurdish and Urdu poetry amongst many other languages. In the history of Persian miniature painting, the stories in Nizami's poems alongside those of Ferdowsi's Shahnama have been the most frequently illustrated literary works. According to the Encyclopædia Britannica, Nizami is "admired in Persian-speaking lands for his originality and clarity of style, though his love of language for its own sake and of philosophical and scientific learning makes his work difficult for the average reader." Nizami composed his verses in Persian language and Western encyclopedias such as Encyclopedia of Islam, Encyclopædia Iranica, Encyclopædia Britannica and orientalists of many countries consider Nizami as a significant Persian poet and hail him as the greatest exponent of romantic epic poetry in Persian literature. Amongst the many notable poets who have taken the Five Treasures of Nizami as their model may be mentioned Amir Khusro, Jalal Farahani, Khwaju Kermani, Mohammad Katebi Tarr-Shirini, Abdul Rahman Jami, Hatefi Jami, Vahshi Bafqi, Maktabi Shirazi, Ali-Shir Nava'i, Abdul Qader-e Bedel Dehlavi, Fuzuli, Hashemi Kermani, Fayzi, Jamali and Ahmad Khani. Not only poets, but also historians such as Rawandi were influenced by Nizami's poetry and used his poems as a source for rendering history. Besides these, scores of poets have started their composition with the first line of the Makhzan al-Asrar. According to Rudolf Gelpke, "Many later poets have imitated Nizami's work, even if they could not equal and certainly not surpass it; Persians, Turks, Indians, to name only the most important ones. The Persian scholar Hekmat has listed not less than forty Persian and thirteen Turkish versions of Layli and Majnun." Nizami's work also stresses various natural elements that are at the heart of Persian culture. The emphasis on stones and jewels are seen, such as in Iskandarnama, where Alexander the Great was about to destroy a golden statue of Buddha, but is stopped by a girl telling him of the jewels' story. Nizami's poetry also a botanic dimension, with mentions of plants and trees. Poetry and science are intertwined for Nizami. He also shows a tendering adoration towards animals throughout his poetry, demonstrating the Persian love for animals.

Nizami is considered to be one of the most celebrated poets in the world due to his universal themes speaking on the love for life and the various beauties of the world. According to Vahid Dastgerdi, "If one would search all existing libraries, one would probably find more than 1000 versions of Layla and Majnun." Jami in his Nafahatol Ons remarks that: "Although most of Nizami's work on the surface appear to be romance, in reality they are a mask for the essential truths and for the explanation of divine knowledge." Jami in his Baharestan mentions that "Nizami's excellence is more manifest than the sun and has no need of description." Hashemi of Kerman remarks: The empire of poetry obtained its law and order from Nizami's beautiful verses and to present words before Nizami's silent speech is a waste of time."

=== Indian subcontinent ===
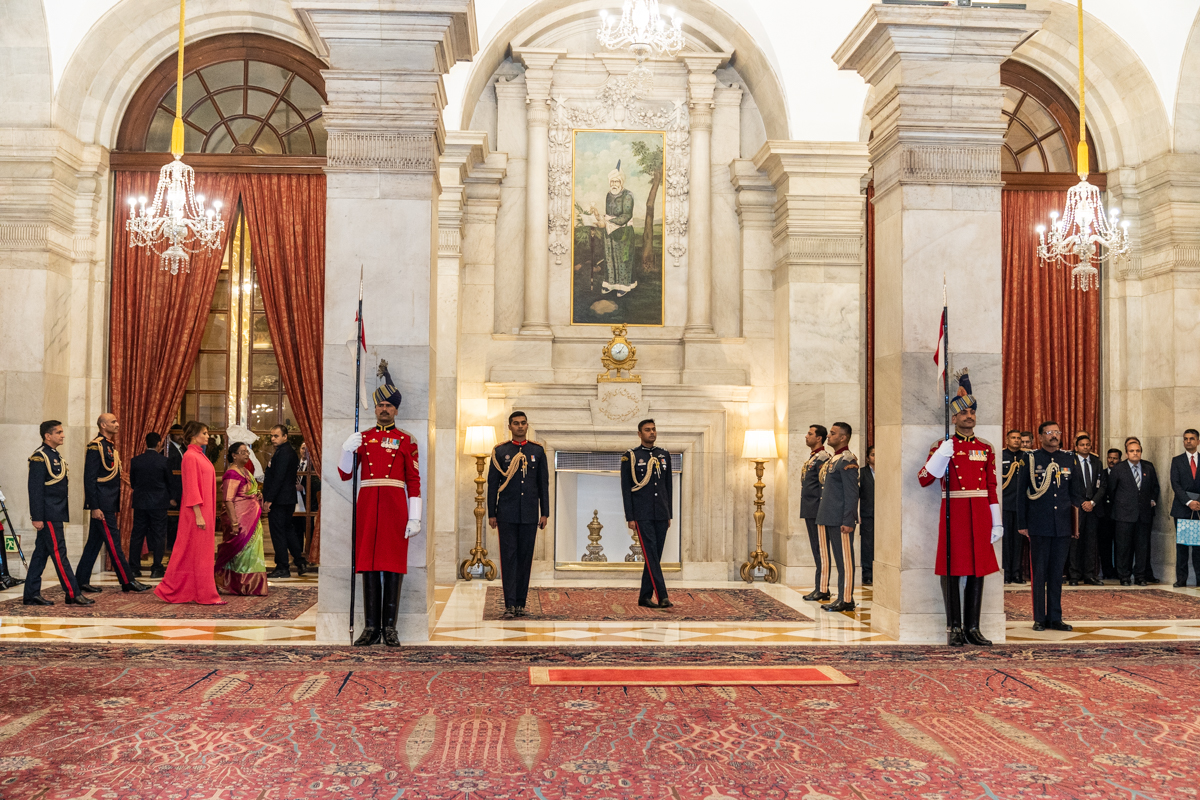
A portrait of Nizami Ganjavi in Rashtrapati Bhavan

Nizami's poems were very popular in the Indian subcontinent. The Persian language and literature have had a great impact on the entire Indian subcontinent. Nizami Ganjavi has been imitated by many poets due to his unique style of speech and language of poetry. Poets who have imitated Nizami's include: Amir Khusro Delhi, Khwaju Kermani, Jami, Hatefi, Ghasemi, Vahshi Bafqi, 'Orfi Shirazi, Maktabi, Faizi, Ashraf Maraghi, Azar Bigdeli, Badriddin Hilali, Rumi Kermani, Maulana Navidi Shirazi and Salman Savaji. Amir Khusro Dehlavi praises Ganjavi in his poems as a master of the art of praise. Amir Khusro writes:
"The ruler of the kingdom of words, famed hero,
Scholar and poet, his goblet [glass] toasts.
In it – pure wine, it's drunkenly sweet,
Yet in goblet [glass] beside us – only muddy setting." A portrait of Nizami hangs in the Ashoka Hall of the Rashtrapati Bhavan, the presidential palace of India. The hall is also decorated with poems by Nizami and other Persian poets. The Khamsa was a popular subject for lavish manuscripts with painted miniatures at the Persian and Mughal courts in later centuries. Examples include the Khamsa of Nizami (British Library, Or. 12208), created for the Mughal emperor Akbar in the 1590s.

=== Soviet Union ===
In the early 1940s and to mark the 800th anniversary of Nizami Ganjavi, Azerbaijani composer Uzeyir Hajibeyov planned to write seven songs based on Nizami's poem about the Seven Beauties. However, Hajibeyov wrote only two songs: Sensiz (Without You, 1941) and Sevgili Janan (Beloved, 1943). Another Azerbaijani composer Gara Garayev, composed Seven Beauties (ballet) in 1947–48 based on Nizami's eponymous poem that won an international acclaim. He also composed Leyli and Majnun (ballet) that premiered on 25 May 1969 at the Azerbaijan State Academic Opera and Ballet Theater in Baku and later was recorded as a film. A minor planet, called 3770 Nizami, was discovered by Soviet astronomer Lyudmila Chernykh in 1974 and named after him. Further, the Museum of Azerbaijan literature in Baku is named after Nizami.

=== Azerbaijan ===
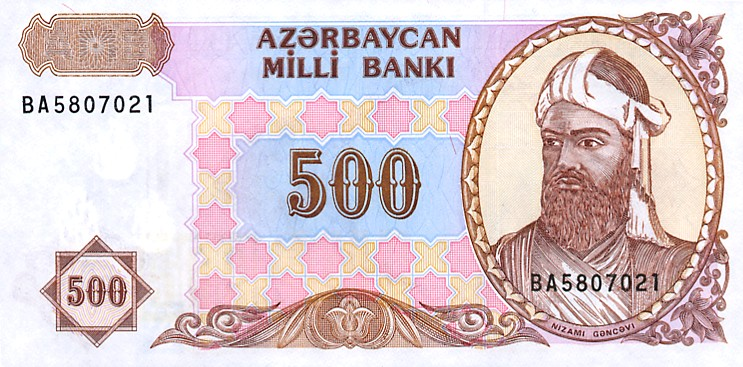
Depiction of Nizami on Azerbaijani manat (1993)

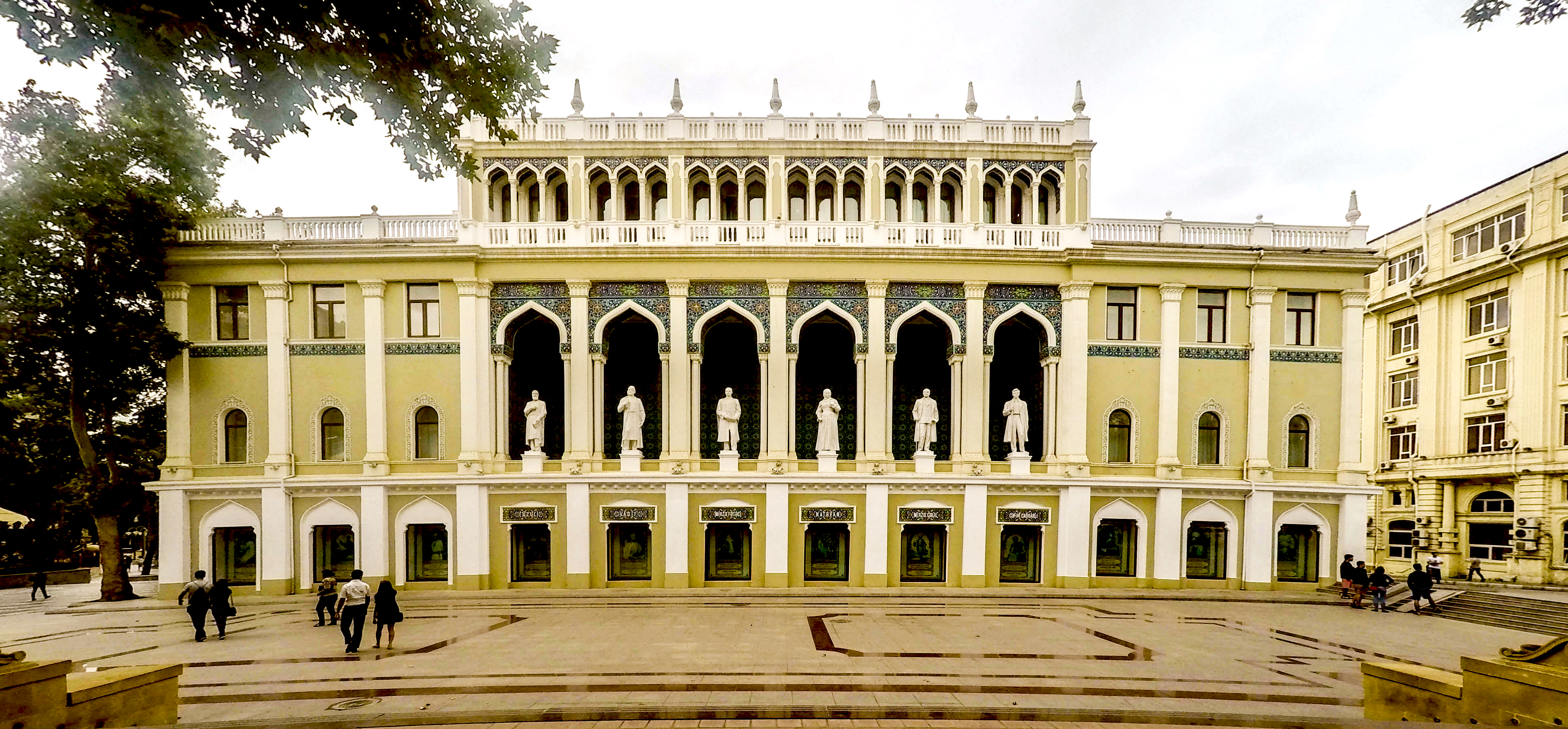
Nizami Museum of Azerbaijani Literature in Baku, Republic of Azerbaijan.

Nizami was depicted on the obverse of the Azerbaijani 500 manat banknote of 1993–2006. In 2008, coinciding with the 800th anniversary of his death, the National Bank of Azerbaijan minted a 100 manat gold commemorative coin dedicated to his memory. The Nizami Museum of Literature is located in Baku, Republic of Azerbaijan. One of the Baku Metro stations is also named after Nizami Ganjavi. There is Institute of Literature named after Nizami and Cinema named after Nizami in Baku. One of the districts of Baku is called Nizami raion. The life of Nizami Ganjavi is shown in the Azerbaijani movie "Nizami" (1982), in which the leading role, role of Nizami Ganjavi, was played by Muslim Magomayev. The Nizami Mausoleum, built in honor of Nizami, stands just outside the city of Ganja in Azerbaijan. It is a tall cylindrical building, surrounded by gardens. To one side, there is a metal statue commemorating Nizami's epic poems. The mausoleum was originally built in 1947 in place of an old collapsed mausoleum and rebuilt in its present form when the Azerbaijani Republic regained its independence after the fall of the Soviet Union in 1991.

Monuments to Nizami exist in many cities of Republic of Azerbaijan and Iran, as well as in Moscow, St. Petersburg and Udmurtiya (Russia), Kyiv (Ukraine), Beijing (China), Tashkent (Uzbekistan), Marneuli (Georgia), Chişinău (Moldova), Rome (Italy).

2021 was declared as "Year of Nizami Ganjavi" in the country.

=== Japanese translation ===
1. "The Story of the Seven Queens (Haft Peykar)", translated into Japanese by Tsuneo Kuroyanagi, published by Heibonsha, July 1971. (Toyo Bunko 191)
2. "Khosrow and Shireen", translated by Emiko Okada, published by Heibonsha, June 1977. (Toyo Bunko 310)
3. "Layla and Majunoon", translated by Emiko Okada, Heibonsha, February 1981. (Toyo Bunko 394) ."

=== Western reception ===
German poet and writer Johann Wolfgang von Goethe wrote: "A gentle, highly gifted spirit, who, when Ferdowsi had completed the collected heroic traditions, chose for the material of his poems the sweetest encounters of the deepest love. Majnun and Layli, Khosrow and Shirin, lovers he presented; meant for one another by premonition, destiny, nature, habit, inclination, passion staunchly devoted to each other; but divided by mad ideas, stubbornness, chance, necessity, and force, then miraculously reunited, yet in the end again in one way or another torn apart and separated from each other."

In regard to the recitation of his poetry, Peter Chelkowski states: "The memorization and recitation of their literary heritage has always been vital to Iranians, whose attitude towards the power of the written and spoken word is reverential. Even today the national passion for poetry is constantly expressed over radio and television, in teahouses, in literary societies, in daily conversation, and in the Musha'areh, the poetry recitation contest. Nizami's work serves as a vehicle and a symbol of this tradition, for it unites universality with deep-rooted artistic endeavor, a sense of justice and passion for the arts and sciences with spirituality and genuine piety. For richness and fineness of metaphor, accuracy, and profundity of psychological observation, and sheer virtuosity of storytelling, Nizami is unequalled".

Nizami's story Layla and Majnun also provided the namesake for a hit single by Eric Clapton, also called "Layla". Recorded with the group Derek and the Dominos, the song was released on the 1970 album Layla and Other Assorted Love Songs. The album was influenced by Nizami and his poetry of unrequited love. The fifth song of the album, "I Am Yours", was based on a poem by Nizami, set to music by Clapton.

In 2004, a conference on Nizami was held at the University of Cambridge. The proceedings of this conference were published under the title Nizami: A Key to the Treasure of Hakim in 2011.

== See also ==
- Nizami Museum of Azerbaijani Literature
- Ferdowsi
- Khaqani
- List of Persian poets and authors
- Nozhat al-Majales
- Persian literature
- Asadi Tusi
- Vis and Rāmin
- Behrouz Servatian, noted Nizami researcher
