= Fuzuli's Divan in Azerbaijani Language =

Divan
- by Fuzuli
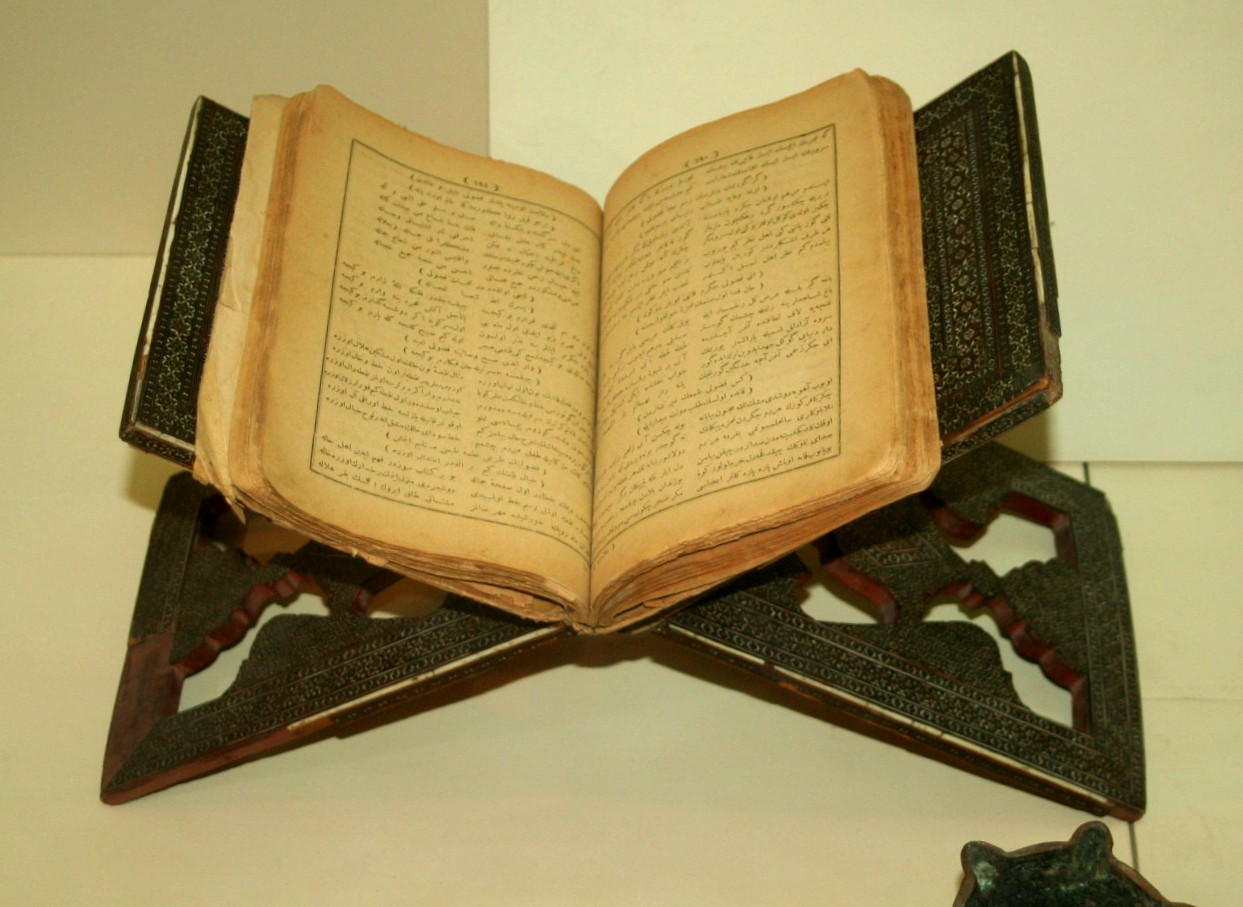
- Fuzuli's Divan in Azerbaijani in the National Museum of History of Azerbaijan
- Original title: دیوان
- Written: 16th century
- Language: Azerbaijani
- Genre(s): Divan

Full text
- az:Azərbaycanca Divan (Füzuli) at Wikisource

Fuzuli's divan in Azerbaijani is his longest work in this language and consists of 302 ghazals, several panegyrics, and rubaʿis. It is one of the two divans written by Fuzuli, with the other one being in Persian.

The oldest known manuscript of the divan is kept at the Institute of Manuscripts of Azerbaijan, in Baku, written no later than the end of the 16th century. It was handed over to the institution by Salman Mumtaz and consists of 65 sheets, each of which contains 20 lines. The divan's manuscript is decorated with two miniatures, and its last page bears the stamp of its owner with the date: 1038 AH (1628).

The divan has been published several times. In 1924, it was published by the Turkish philologist and publicist Mehmet Fuat Köprülü under the title "Musahhabi külliyati divani Fizuli". In 1948, it was published in Istanbul by the Turkish literary historian Abdülbaki Gölpınarlı (second edition - 1961). The divan was also compiled and published by the Nizami Museum of Azerbaijani Literature on the basis of the old manuscripts.

== See also ==
- Hashish and Wine
- Leyli and Majnun
