= Al-Fadhli =

Al-Fadhli, Al Fadhli or Alfadhli (Arabic: الفضلي, from the adjective أفضل (ʾafḍal) = "best", "most outstanding") is an Arabic surname most commonly found in Kuwait and Saudi Arabia . The Arabic definite article Al- distinguishes it from the more numerous Arabic languages surname Fazli (Persian: فضلی).

Notable people with this family name include:

- Abdul Hadi Al-Fadhli (1935–2013), Iraqi Islamic author and thinker
- Ahmad Al Fadhli (born 1982), Kuwaiti footballer
- Khaled Al-Fadhli (born 1974), Kuwaiti footballer
- Saad Kamil Al-Fadhli (born 1963), former Kuwaiti football referee
- Zaher Farid Al-Fadhli (born 1986), Yemeni footballer
