= Konstantin Senchikhin =

Azerbaijani architect (1905–1985)

- Russian: Константин Сенчихин
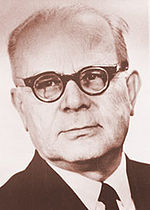
- Born: 1905; Baku, AzSSR
- Died: 1985 (aged 79–80); Baku, AzSSR
- Education: Azerbaijan State Oil and Industry University
- Occupation: Architect
- Awards: Order of the Red Banner of Labour

Konstantin Ivanovich Senchikhin (Russian: Константин Иванович Сенчихин) was an honored architect of the Azerbaijan SSR, the author of many buildings in the city of Baku, the director of the Baku metro project, the architect of the "False Baku" project.

He is the architect of Ganjlik, Khatai and 20 January metro stations.

== Biography ==
Konstantin Ivanovich Senchikhin was born in 1905 in Baku. He studied at the Azerbaijan Polytechnic Institute. He studied in the same group with Mikayil Huseynov and Sadiq Dadashov.

Senchikhin's first work is a factory kitchen built in Sabunchu. It was also his thesis. Later, a factory-kitchen was built in Surakhani with his project. Photos of the built factory-kitchen were published in the 6 th issue of "Architektura SSSR" magazine in 1934.

During the years of his activity, based on his projects, the building of the Azerbaijan Medical Institute, the "Dinamo" Sports Complex, the building of the Ministry of Defense of Azerbaijan, the complex of residential and administrative buildings at the intersection of Samad Vurgun and Bakikhanov streets, the Lokbatan Palace of Culture, the Monolith and the House of Artists were built in Baku.

=== "False Baku" project ===
From the first days of the Second World War, the idea of masking the entire capital to protect Baku and its numerous industrial facilities from air attacks became relevant. The General Staff of the State Defense Committee of the USSR made a decision in this regard and appointed Konstantin Senchikhin as the head of the masking service of the city of Baku. To camouflage the city and to observe the buildings in the city from the air, they allocate an airplane at his disposal.

As a result, the false Baku project was being implemented under the leadership of Konstantin Senchikhin, 30 km away from Baku. Here, a new city was built from models to deceive enemy planes, and even constructions imitating the movement of cars, city trams, and trains are built. The created False Baku project was also liked by the central government. Konstantin Senchikhin said the following about this project:

I thought that they would shoot me in my place. A scene happened that surprised everyone - a general from Moscow came up to me, shook my hand and said: "Thank you for the very good and unique project you have prepared for our country. It is so real that even I, knowing that what I saw was not the real Baku, I couldn't feel the differences". At that moment, I felt how the tension I had experienced in recent days suddenly disappeared. The feeling of liberation was so strong that I didn't remember anything more about that day, even how I got home. I don't even remember when I arrived.

=== Baku metro ===
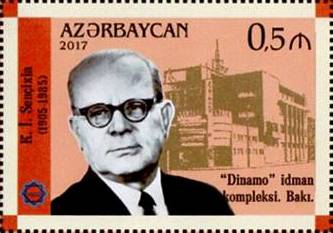

Konstantin Senchikhin led the "Bakumetro project" for many years. After the technical project of the first line was ready, Senchikhin went to Moscow to present the project to the Ministry of Transport of the USSR. However, at the meeting, the minister suggested that the costs allocated to the subway should be reduced by reducing the length of the platforms and the number of carriages. However, Senchikhin did not agree with this, he noted that Baku was an industrial city and its population would grow rapidly. As the population increased, there would be a need to enlarge the platforms and stations, and to increase the number of carriages. Expanding an existing station costed more than building a new station. With this, he could satisfy the minister and got the amount he wanted.

After the completion of the construction of the first line, Senchikhin was awarded the Order of the Red Banner of Labor. Ganjlik, Depo, Khatai and 20 January metro stations were built based on the projects of Senchikhin. His last job was January 20 metro station. He prepared the project of this station together with Tokay Mammadov. The station project was prepared in the hospital where he was a patient.

He died in Baku in 1985.

== Legacy ==
On June 22, 2017, Azermarka printed a stamp depicting Konstantin Senchikhin by order of the Union of Architects of Azerbaijan.

== Buildings ==
- Monolith
- "Dinamo" sports palace (now Dinamo hotel)
- House of Artists
- Building of Azerbaijan Medical Institute
- The building of the Ministry of Defence of Azerbaijan
- Complex of residential and administrative buildings at the intersection of Samad Vurgun and Bakikhanov streets
- Lokbatan Palace of Culture
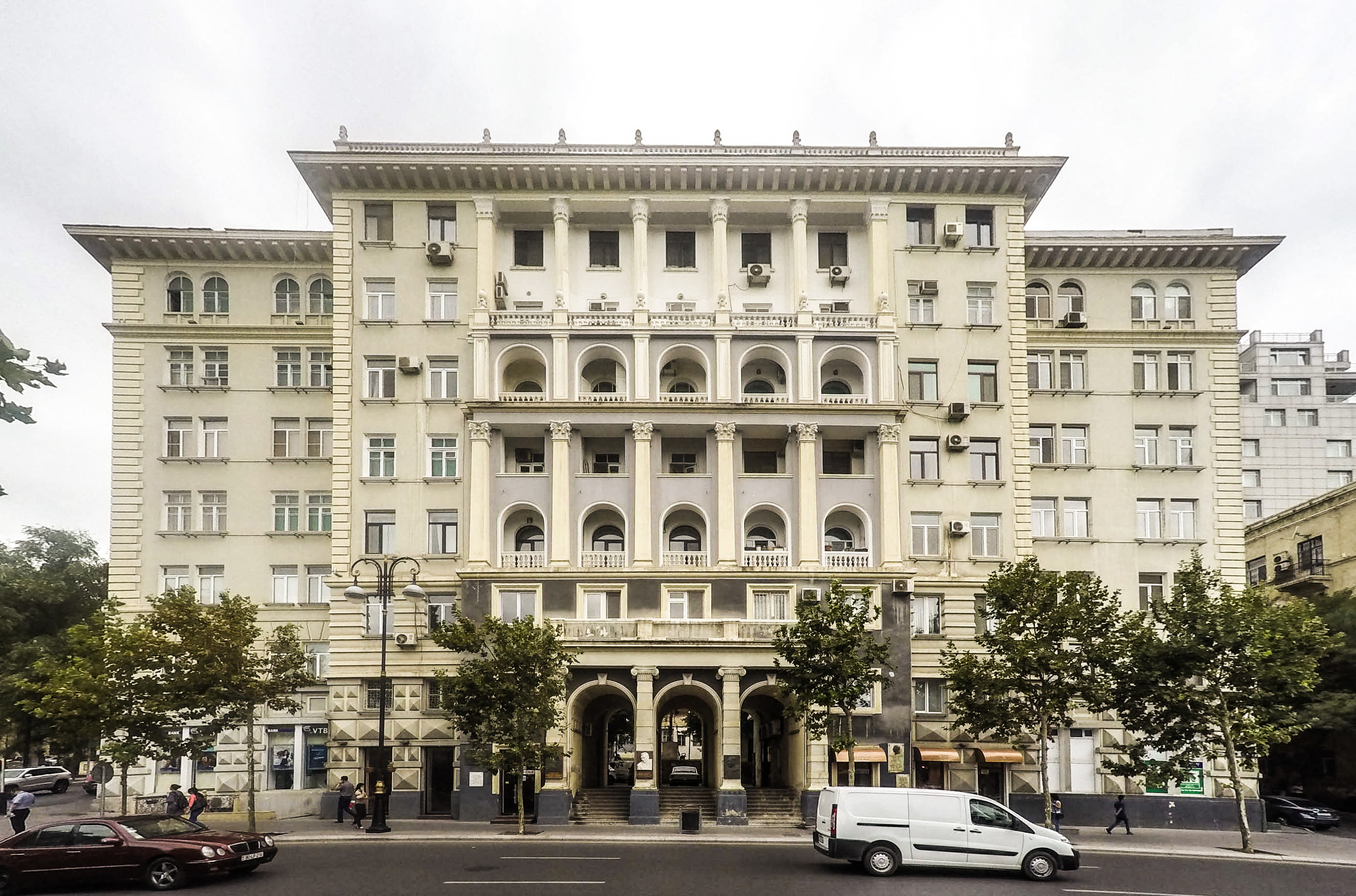

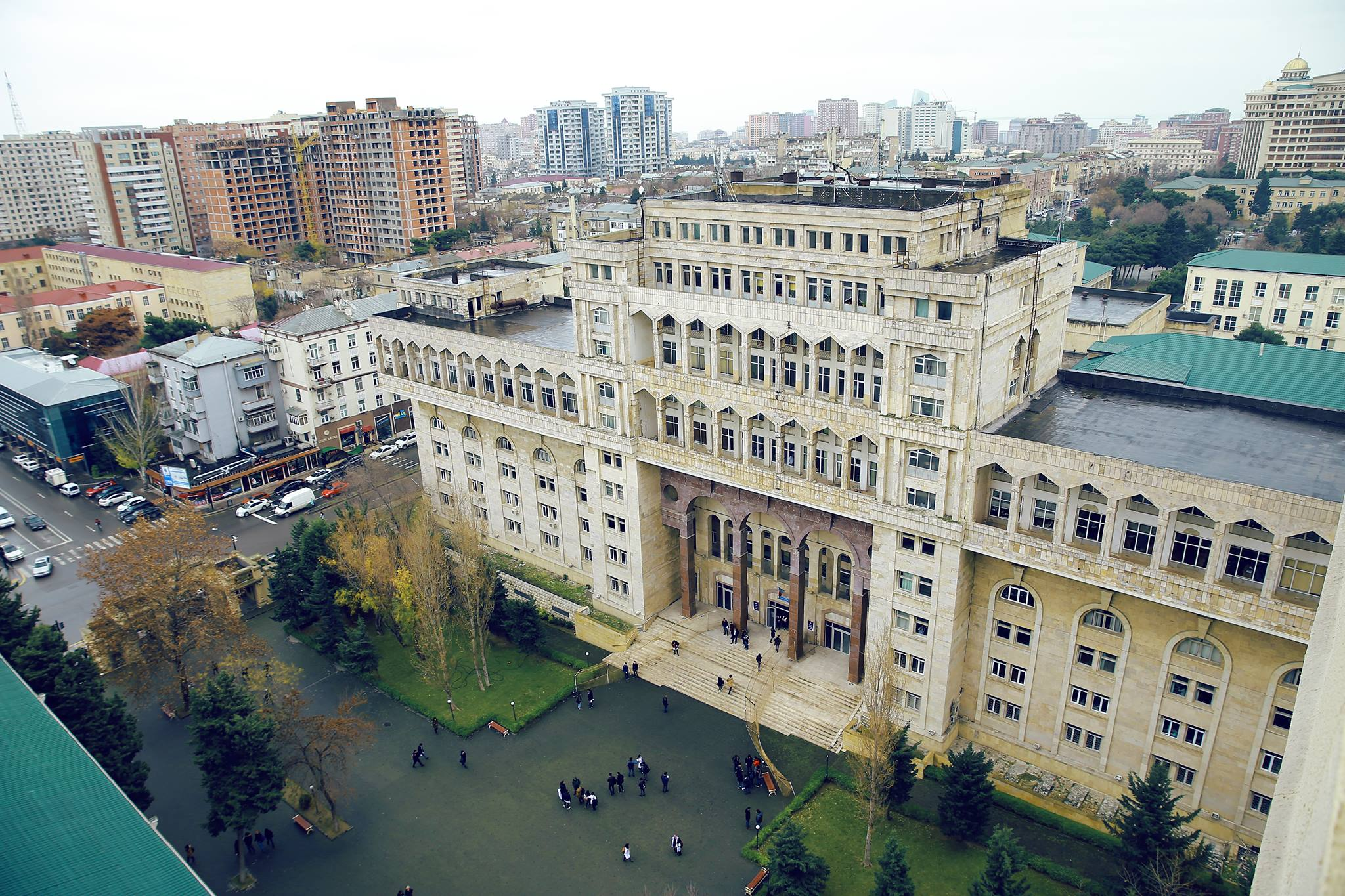
