= Scientists' residential house =

Building in Baku, Azerbaijan

- Azerbaijani: Alimlər evi
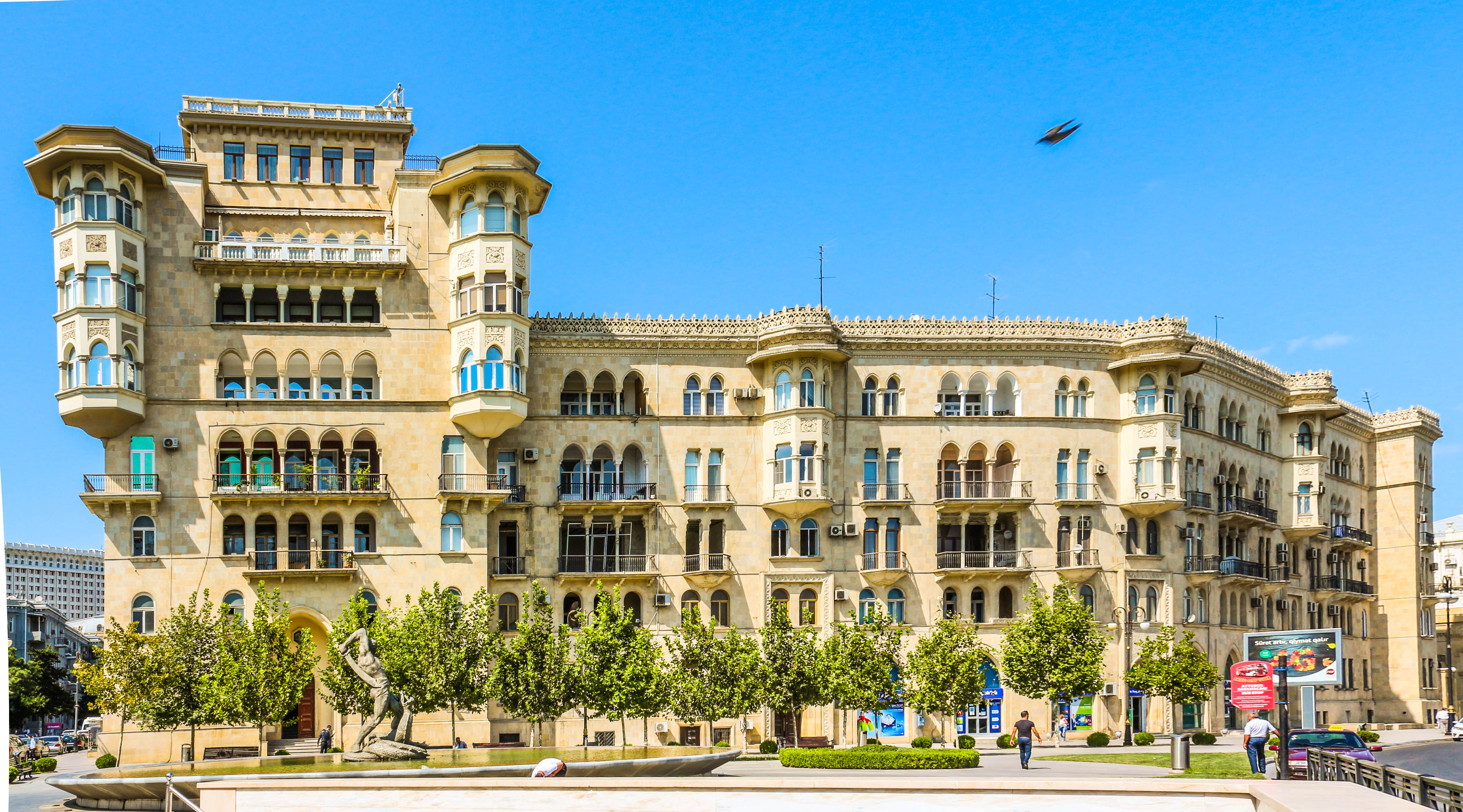
- Interactive map of the Scientists' residential house area

General information
- Location: 1 Shovkat Alakbarova, Baku, Azerbaijan
- Coordinates: 40°21′38″N 49°49′59″E
- Construction started: 1946

Design and construction
- Architects: Sadig Dadashov; Mikayil Useynov

"Scientists' residential house" also known as "Residential house of science workers" (Azerbaijani: Alimlər evi) is a building on Neftchilar Avenue in Baku, the capital of Azerbaijan.

== History ==
It is built on the project of the architects Sadig Dadashov and Mikayil Useynov in 1946. This is one of the last joint creations of Dadashov and Useynov, and was designed according to an individual assignment.

The house is facing the square of the Bakhram Gur monument and the adjacent section of the avenue.

From the architectural point of view, the town-planning arrangement of the building, its general contour at the bend of the avenue space, as well as the large divisions of its volume are successful. This house is considered "a significant milestone in the development of the architecture of the Soviet Azerbaijan in the post-war period"

== Notable residents ==
Such outstanding personalities as the author of its project, Mikayil Useynov (apartment 9), the singer, People's Artist of the USSR, Rashid Behbudov, the literary critics, Jafar Khandan and Feyzulla Gasimzadeh, Soviet and Azerbaijani statesmen and party leaders, the oil scientist Anvar Alikhanov, the Honored Pilot of USSR Nuraddin Aliyev, the literary scholar and writer Mir Jalal Pashayev, the academicians Shirali Mamedov, Ilyas Abdullaev, Musa Aliyev, and Zahid Khalilov, lived in there. Today, memorial plaques in the memory of these figures are installed on the wall of the house.

== See also ==
- Monolith
- Buzovnaneft
- Government House
