= Hamid Arasly =

Azerbaijani Soviet philologist, literary critic (1902–1983)

- Born: 23 February 1909; Ganja, Azerbaijan
- Died: 20 November 1983 (aged 74); Baku, Azerbaijan
- Known for: Publication of the Book of Dede Korkut
- Awards: Honored Scientist of Azerbaijan

Academic background
- Education: Azerbaijan State Pedagogical University

Academic work
- Discipline: Philology, literary criticism, literary history
- Institutions: National Academy of Sciences of the Azerbaijan SSR

Hamid Mammadtaghi oglu Arasly (Azerbaijani: Həmid Hacı Məmmədtağı oğlu Araslı; 23 February 1909 – 20 November 1983) was an Azerbaijani literary critic, Doctor of Sciences in Philology, and an academic at the Azerbaijan National Academy of Sciences. He is acknowledged as one of the most prominent literary critics and philologists of Azerbaijan.

Hamid Arasly has conducted extensive critical research of the works of well-known Azerbaijani and Persian poets as Nizami Ganjavi, Fuzûlî, as well as Imamaddin Nasimi. He has authored multiple works on Azerbaijani literary history. One of his most important contributions to his field is the release of the first full-text Russian edition of the Book of Dede Korkut in 1939.

His period of activity corresponds with heightened repression in the Soviet Union. In 1936, using the eastern manuscripts he had been collecting for a few years, Hamid Arasly created the Manuscripts Bureau within the Azerbaijan National Academy of Sciences. However, a year later, some of the manuscripts preserved in the bureau were found to be against the principles of Soviet ideology. The academic was subsequently fired from his position. He has also been pressured by the Soviet authorities for his publication of the Book of Dede Korkut. The Book, which is a collection of epic stories describing the lifestyle of the nomadic Turkic peoples and their pre-Islamic beliefs, was criticized by the Soviet government for allegedly promoting bourgeois nationalism. Nevertheless, the publication of dastans did not wholly cease during that period.

== Biography ==
Hamid Arasly was born on 23 February 1909 in Ganja, to a priest father. His father was one of the clerical intellectuals of his time. He started his studies at the Ganja Teachers' Gymnasium in 1922. After graduating from there in 1926, he worked in a village school for 3 years where he gained experience as a teacher and principal.

In 1929, he was admitted to the Faculty of Linguistics and Literature at the Azerbaijan State Pedagogic Institute. He graduated early in 1931 and went back to Ganja to assume the position of Deputy Chair of the Ganja Education Bureau. After a year, Hamid Arasly went to Baku to start his doctoral studies there, simultaneously working as the Director of Eastern Department of the new Library of the National Academy of Sciences of the Azerbaijan SSR. There, he started collecting historically significant Eastern manuscripts. In 1936, he officialized this pursuit of his, creating the Manuscripts Bureau within the National Academy of Sciences. That year, he became a member of the Union of Azerbaijani Writers. In 1938, it was revealed that some of the manuscripts he collected were against the principles of Soviet ideology. Because of this, he was fired from the Manuscripts Bureau. He started to teach at Azerbaijan State University in the same year.

In 1943, he defended his thesis, named "Azerbaijani literature in XVII - XVIII centuries", and earned the title Candidate of Sciences - roughly corresponding to a western-style Ph.D. Starting in 1944, he worked as the Head of the Department of Near Eastern Studies at the National Academy of Sciences. In 1954, he received the title Doctor of Sciences and became a professor of literature and philology. Between 1960 and 1968, he was the chairman of the Nizami Museum of Azerbaijani Literature. Hamid Arasly was the recipient of numerous honorary titles, such as Honored Scientist of Azerbaijan (1979) and Uzbekistan (1968). He became a full member of the National Academy of Sciences in 1968.

== Scientific activity ==
Hamid Arasly was the author of research works on many of the great Azerbaijani poets and scholars such as Imamaddin Nasimi, Saib Tabrizi, Molla Panah Vagif, Habibi and Molla Vali Vidadi. He particularly made great contributions to the study of Nizami and Fuzûlî's heritage. For example, Arasly prepared a full collection of Fuzuli's poems - Fuẓūlī and his Works.

He was also engaged in substantial research on Kitabi Dede Korkut, Koroghlu, and Azerbaijani folklore in general. For the first time, in 1939, Arasly published the Book of Dede Korkut in the Latin alphabet. He has also conducted a critical review of the dastan, asserting that Azerbaijani is the closest language to which is spoken in the book.

Hamid Arasly was one of the main authors of a two-volume “A Brief History of Azerbaijani Literature” (1943-1944) and three-volume “History of Azerbaijani Literature” (1957-1960). He authored some works focused on the relation between Azerbaijani literature and Persian, Turkish, Uzbek, and Turkmen literature.
