= Ahmed Talib Bosnawi =

Ottoman official and poet

Ahmed Talib Bosnawi (also spelled Ahmad Taleb Bosnavi; died 1674) was an Ottoman official and poet of Bosnian origin. Born in Bosnia, he pursued early education in his native region, before moving to Constantinople (modern-day Istanbul) where he furthered his studies. Entering service under Ottoman Grand Vizier Köprülüzade Fazıl Ahmed Pasha (in office: 1661–1676), he advanced in the royal court, ultimately becoming head of the chancery (reis ül-küttab). Bosnawi authored a divan consisting of Arabic, Turkish and Persian poems. His Persian poems consist of five ghazals and six qet'as. Bosnawi elaborates about his spiritual striving in his ghazals. His Persian poetry is deemed as being written in an elegant and simple style.
