= Monolith (building) =

- Azerbaijani: Monolit
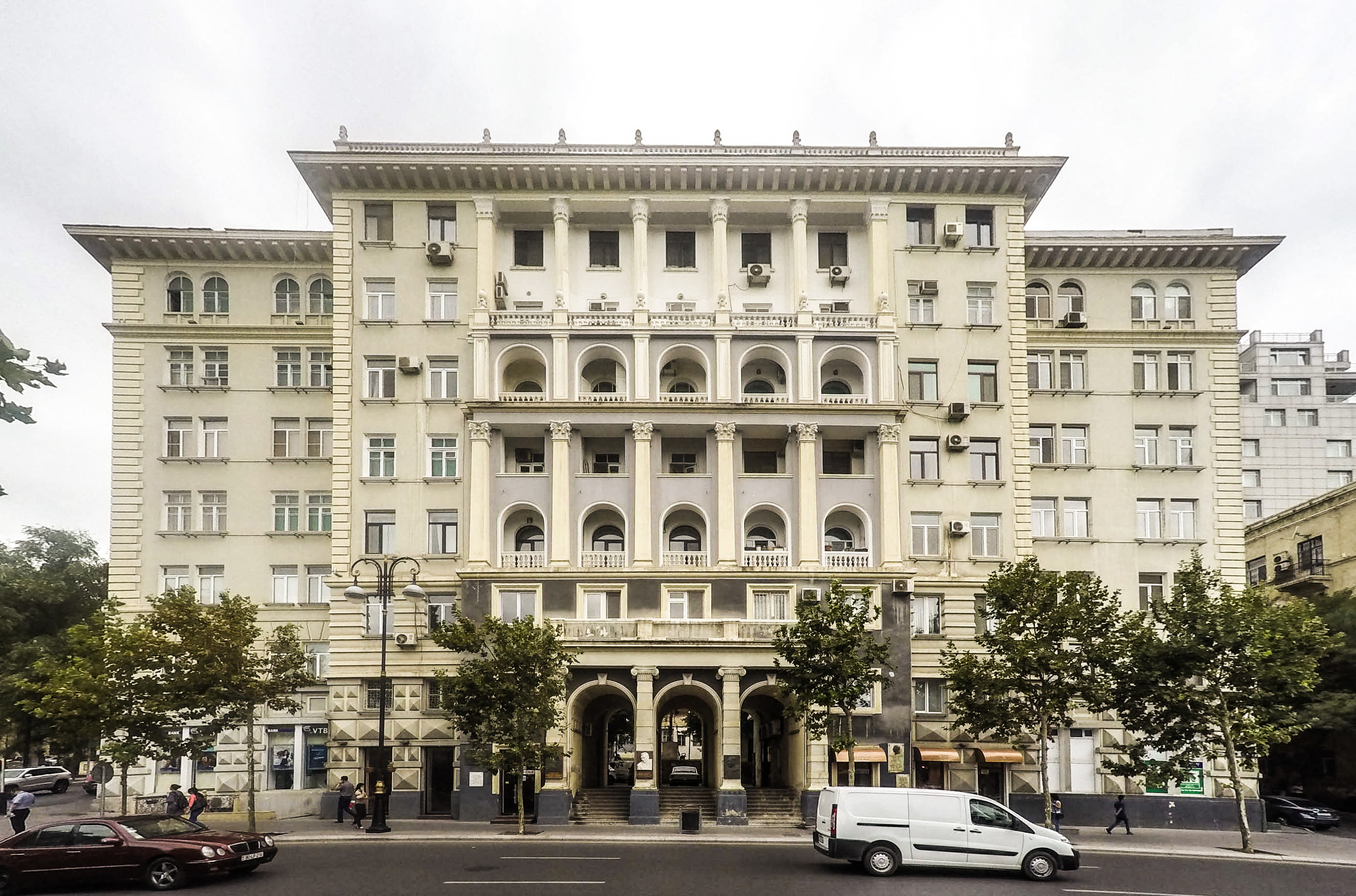
- Interactive map of the Monolith area

General information
- Architectural style: Neoclassicism
- Location: Azerbaijan Avenue, Baku, Azerbaijan
- Coordinates: 40°22′09″N 49°50′04″E
- Construction started: 1940
- Inaugurated: 1931

Design and construction
- Architect: Konstantin Senchikhin

"Monolith" is a multi-storey building in Baku, the capital of Azerbaijan. The southern facade of the building faces Istiglaliyyat Street (formerly Kommunisticheskaya), the northern one - to Ahmed Javad Street (formerly Aligeydar Garayev), and the main eastern one - to Azerbaijan Avenue (formerly Husi Hajiyev Street).

It was built in 1940 by the architect Konstantin Senchikhin. According to the order of the Cabinet of Ministers of the Republic of Azerbaijan, "Monolith" is considered an architectural monument of history and culture of local significance of Azerbaijan.

== History ==
Initially, a garbage dump of the city was located on the site of the building. At the end of the 19th century, small one- and two-storey houses, tightly pressed against each other, appeared in this place.

In the early 30s of the 20th century, it was decided to build a large residential building on this site. In this regard, the dilapidated houses located here began to be demolished. Exploration work and geological survey of the site began to be carried out. Numerous exploration wells were drilled, which at the site of the planned construction revealed the exit of a huge monolithic rock. Thanks to this finding, the construction project was named "Monolith".

In 1931–1932, construction preparations began, and there was an active demolition of dilapidated houses on the site of the future public garden named after Nizami. The first stage of the construction was the building of a part of the edifice located along the Karaev Street (now Ahmad Javad). When this part of the "Monolith" reached the second floor in some places, the demolition of the old building on Husi Hajiyev Street (now - Azerbaijan Avenue) and on the Kommunisticheskaya Street (now - Istiglaliyyat) began and the preparation of the construction site there began. During the third stage, the demolition of another old two-story building above Kommunisticheskaya Street, located opposite the Ismayiliyya Palace, began, and, subsequently, the construction of the "Monolith" on that site.

By 1940, all construction works of the building were completed, including the roof. The RosPhoto archive contains a photograph of the building taken by V. Shevtsov and dated with October 1940. The externally completed Monolith was also present in war photographs of June 1941. After the war, the interior decoration of the building was completed.

A large photograph of "Monolith" hung in the A. V. Shchusev Museum of Architecture in Moscow as an example of domestic urban planning.

In 2001, "Monolith" by the order of the Cabinet of Ministers of the Republic of Azerbaijan No. 132 was included in the list of objects protected by the state and declared an architectural monument of history and culture of local importance.

Houses located on the site of "Monolith"

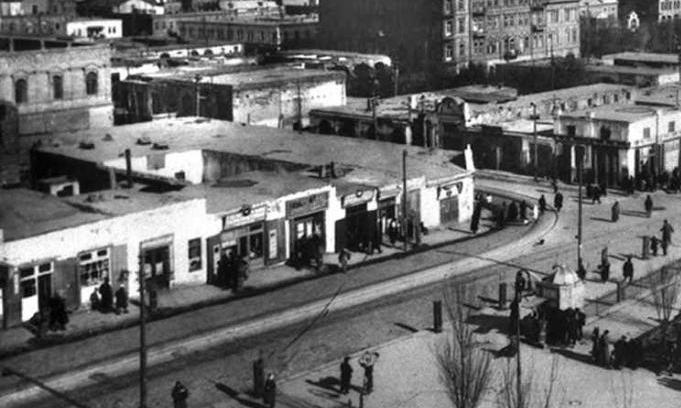
View from the Ismailiyya Palace, 1928

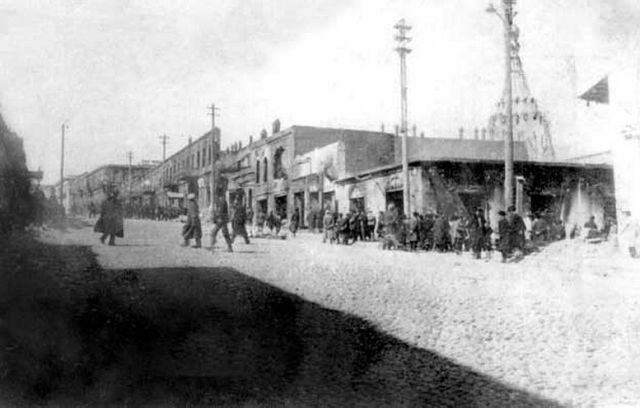
View from the intersection of Nikolaevskaya and Bazarnaya streets

== Architecture ==
The "Monolith" was built on the project of Baku architect Konstantin Senchikhin in 1940 in the style of the modernized classics (neoclassicism). The building is U-shaped. The main facade of the building overlooks Nizami Square. According to the authors of the textbook History of Soviet Architecture, the Monolith building occupies a crucial place in the ensemble of the square. The main facade of the building, according to the art critic Leonid Bretanitsky, occupies a prominent place in the architectural frame of the Nizami Square. The residential building "Monolith", according to the art critic Rene Efendizadeh, together with the building of the Museum of Azerbaijani Literature named after Nizami Ganjavi, plays a major role in organizing the space of the square named after Nizami. The planning and compositional solution of the building faces the square, and its large divisions, according to Efendizade, emphasize the significance of the building and its important role in organizing the space of the square.

In the architecture of the Monolith, Brittanytsky emphasizes the rough heaviness of the lower tier, which is processed with decorative masonry of large rustic stones. Together with the developed cornice and vertical stripes of rustic materials at the corners of the building, this tier sets off, according to Brittany, the small scale of neoclassical architectural forms inherent in the building. The main facade of the building, which faces Nizami Square, is decorated with arched passages leading to the courtyard, above which there are small decorative porticos that serve as a background to the monument of the 12th century poet Nizami Ganjavi, which was later installed in 1949.

According to the architect Hanifa Alaskarov, the "Monolith" residential building in Baku is one of the largest buildings of the pre-war period. According to Alaskarov, there is no national characteristic of architectural forms in this building, but, despite this, the architect, according to Alaskarov, correctly taking into account the natural and climatic conditions, managed to give his work originality and expressiveness, which can be traced in the central multi-tiered loggia.

== Notable residents ==
In "Monolith" lived the composer and the Peoples Artist of the USSR Uzeyir Hajibeyov, the poet Mirvarid Dilbazi, the Peoples Artist of the USSR Marziya Davudova, the philosopher Heydar Huseynov, the former deputy chairman of the Council of Ministers of the republic in the 50-60s Okumya Sultanova, the Chairman of the Azerbaijan Sports Committee Bagir Bagirov, his son, film artist, laureate of the USSR State Prize Fikret Bagirov, soloist of the opera house Idris Agalarov, the head of the special department under the president, the Colonel Shamsi Rahimov, and many other famous personalities. In the right building of the "Monolith" (the one facing the street of Ahmed Javad), lived mainly the generals of the Baku military garrison among whom were Huseyn Rasulbekov, and Akim Abbasov. Today, memorial plaques are installed on the wall of the house to commemorate some famous residents of the house.

== See also ==
- Mitrofanov Residence
- Mikado Cinematography Building
- Scientists' residential house

== Sources ==
- Alaskarov, Hanifa (1951). Архитектура Советского Азербайджана [Architecture of Soviet Azerbaijan] (in Russian). Moscow: Государственное издательство архитектуры и градостроительства.
- Bretanitski, Leonid (1970). Баку: архитектурно-художественные памятники [Baku: architectural and artistic monuments] (in Russian). Moscow: Искусство.
- Afandizada, Rana (1986). Архитектура Советского Азербайджана [Architecture of Soviet Azerbaijan] (in Russian). Moscow: Стройиздат.
