= Fuzuli (poet) =

Azerbaijani poet (1483–1556)

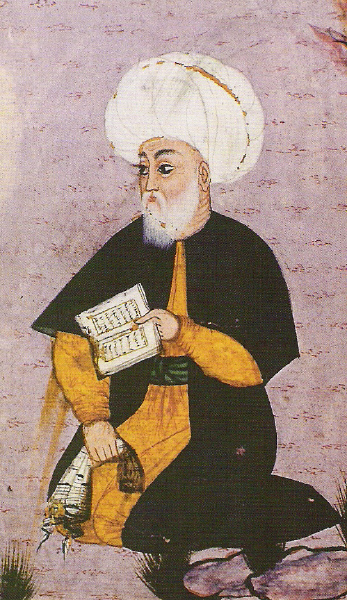
- Miniature depiction of Fuzuli in 16th-century work Meşâ'ir al-Şu'arâ by Aşık Çelebi
- Born: Muhammad bin Suleyman; 1483
- Died: 1556 (aged 72–73)
- Resting place: Karbala
- Occupation: Poet
- Children: Fazli
- Writing career
- Language: Azerbaijani; Persian; Arabic
- Notable work: Leylī va Macnūn

Muhammad bin Suleyman (Note: Also spelled in various sources as Muhammad bin Suleiman, Mehmed bin Suleyman, and Mohammad bin Solayman.) (Azerbaijani: Məhəmməd Süleyman oğlu, مَحمد سلیمان اوغلی; 1483–1556), better known by his pen name Fuzuli (Füzuli, فضولی), was a 16th-century poet who composed works in his native Azerbaijani, as well as Persian and Arabic. He is regarded as one of the greatest poets of Turkic literature and a prominent figure in both Azerbaijani and Ottoman literature. Fuzuli's work was widely known and admired throughout the Turkic cultural landscape from the 16th to the 19th centuries, with his fame reaching as far as Central Asia and India.

Born in 1483 in modern-day Iraq, Fuzuli studied literature, mathematics, astronomy, and languages as a child. During his lifetime, his homeland changed hands between the Aq Qoyunlu, Safavid, and Ottoman states. He composed poetry for officials in all three empires, writing his first known poem to Shah Alvand Mirza of the Aq Qoyunlu. Fuzuli wrote most of his poetry during the Ottoman rule of Iraq, which is why he is also sometimes called an Ottoman poet. Throughout his life, he had several patrons but never found one that fully satisfied him—as he wrote—and his desire to join a royal court was never realised. Despite wishing to see places like Tabriz in modern-day Iran, Anatolia, and India, he never travelled outside Iraq. In 1556, Fuzuli died from the plague and was buried in Karbala.

Fuzuli is best known for his Azerbaijani works, especially his ghazals (a form of love poem) and his lyric poem Leylī va Macnūn, which is an interpretation of a Middle Eastern story of tragic love. He also wrote dīvāns (collections of poems) in Azerbaijani, Persian, and possibly Arabic. His style has been described as being distinguished by his "intense expression of feelings" and his use of mystic metaphors and symbols. His poetry shows influences from Persian poets like Nizami, Jami, and Hafez, as well as Azerbaijani poets like Habibi and Nasimi.

Fuzuli played a role in the development of the Azerbaijani language, with his writings being described as elevating Azerbaijani poetry and language to new heights. His work has been characterised as a reconciliation of Azerbaijani, Persian, and Arabic literary practices, as well as of Shia and Sunni beliefs. He remains a popular poet in Azerbaijan, Turkey, Iran, and Iraq.

== Life ==
Fuzuli, whose given name was Muhammad (Note: Also written as Mehmed in some sources.) and whose father's name was Suleyman, was born in 1483. He wrote under the name Fuzuli, (Note: Also spelled in various sources as Fuduli, Fozuli, and Fizuli.) which can be translated either as "presumptuous, superfluous" or "exalted, superior, virtuous". In his Persian dīvān (a collection of poems), he wrote that he picked this name to stand out, knowing that no one else would choose such a pen name. Little is known about Fuzuli's youth. He was probably a Shia Muslim (Note: Whether Fuzuli was a Sunni or a Shia Muslim is a matter of scholarly debate. The historian Derin Terzioğlu states that it is probable that Fuzuli was a Shia Muslim, and according to the scholars of medieval Turkic literature Âmil Çelebioğlu and Hasibe Mazıoğlu, he was a moderate Shia Muslim. On the other hand, the Turkish poet and politician Süleyman Nazif considered the poet to be a Sunni Muslim.) of Azerbaijani Turkic origin, descending from the Bayat tribe. Although some contemporary sources refer to him as Fuz̤ūlī-yi Baghdādī (lit. 'Fuzuli of Baghdad'), suggesting he was born or raised in that city or its surroundings, other sources cite the nearby cities of Najaf, Hilla, or Karbala as his birthplace. His father was reported to have once been a mufti (Islamic jurist) in Hilla, which suggests that Fuzuli likely came from an educated family. As a child, he studied literature, mathematics, astronomy, and languages, learning Persian and Arabic in addition to his native Azerbaijani. He had an interest in poetry since his childhood, with his poems suggesting that his initial inspiration was drawn from the works of the late-15th-century Azerbaijani poet Habibi.

Fuzuli lived in Iraq under the Aq Qoyunlu confederation, which ruled the region between 1470 and the conquest of the region by Shah Ismail I of the Iranian Safavid dynasty in 1508. By the time of the Safavid takeover, Fuzuli was already a popular young poet and had dedicated his first known poem, a Persian qaṣīdah (eulogy), to Shah Alvand Mirza of the Aq Qoyunlu. After 1514, the poet received patronage from Ibrahim Khan Mawsillu, the Safavid administrator of Baghdad, whom he met during Mawsillu's visit to Najaf and Karbala. He dedicated his first known Azerbaijani poem, a mas̱navī (a poem written in rhyming couplets) entitled Bang va Bādah (lit. 'Hashish and Wine'), to Ismail I and two qaṣīdahs and one tarjī'band (a poem with repeating verses) to Mawsillu. After Mawsillu was murdered by his own nephew in 1527, Fuzuli lost his patron and moved to either Hilla or Najaf, likely because he could not find another reliable patron among the Safavid nobles. During this time, he worked as a custodian of the Imam Ali Shrine in Najaf. Despite his employment, he did not have much money and relied on different patrons for support. His life between 1527 and 1534 is largely unknown.

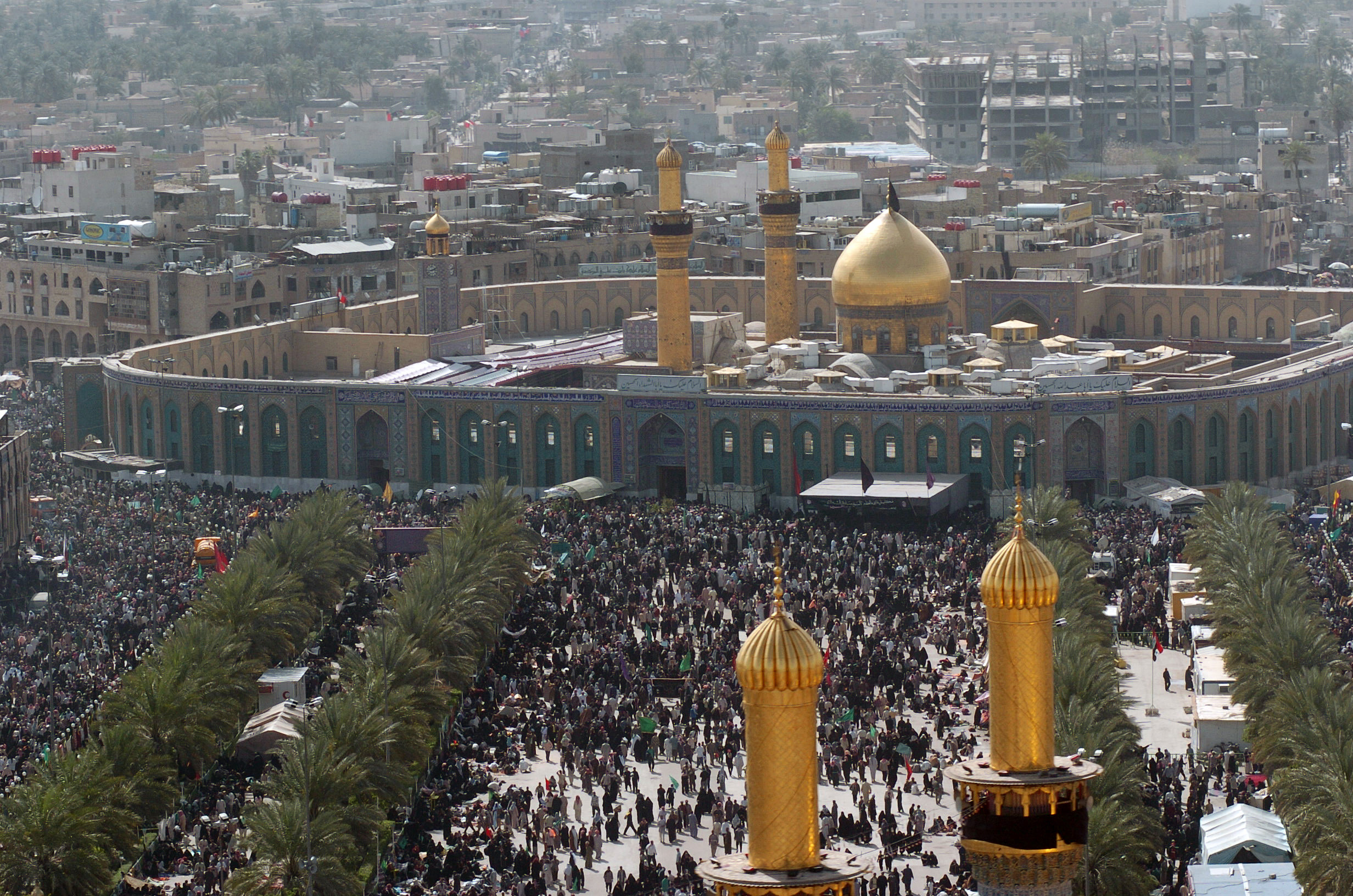
The Imam Husayn Shrine, where Fuzuli worked as a candle-lighter later in his life

When Sultan Suleiman I of the Ottoman Empire captured Baghdad in 1534, Fuzuli was already in his fifties. He presented the sultan with a long qaṣīdah and also wrote qaṣīdahs to Ottoman officials in his entourage in order to earn their favour. One of these officials, Celalzade Mustafa Çelebi, was appointed nişancı (head of the Ottoman Empire's imperial chancery) while in Baghdad and arranged for the poet to receive a daily grant of nine akçes from the excess of donations made to Shia shrines. When Fuzuli was unable to obtain the money from the officers of the Ministry of Evkaf, who were responsible for distributing it, he expressed his disappointment in a poetic letter called Şikāyatnāmah (lit. ''Complaint''), written in Azerbaijani and addressed to Çelebi. In the letter, he declared that he had abandoned all hope, explaining that he had been greatly affected by the political and theological instability of his age. His stipend was restored following the letter. At the time, he was working as a candle-lighter at the Bektashi convent in the Imam Husayn Shrine in Karbala. He wrote in his poems that he had never found a patron who satisfied his needs and his desire to join a royal court had never been realised. Despite expressing a strong desire to see places like Tabriz in modern-day Iran, Anatolia, and India, he never travelled outside modern-day Iraq. In 1556, he died from the plague, either in Baghdad or Karbala, (Note: According to literary researcher Muhsin Macit, Fuzuli died in Baghdad. However, Abdülkadir Karahan, a scholar of medieval Turkic literature, argues that Karbala is the most likely place of his death.) and was buried in Karbala near the Imam Husayn Shrine, in a türbah (a small tomb-mausoleum). According to Bektashi oral tradition, the türbah was built by Abdü'l-mü'min Dede, the Bektashi sheikh (a spiritual guide) of Fuzuli, and the poet was buried next to him. (Note: Mazıoğlu states that this tradition was fabricated by the Bektashis of Karbala without any supporting evidence. She adds that there is no known connection between Fuzuli and Bektashism.)

== Poetry ==
Fuzuli composed poetry and prose in Azerbaijani, Persian and Arabic. Fifteen of his works are extant. The Encyclopædia Iranica distinguishes his work by "the way in which he integrates the mystic and the erotic, in the combination of the conventionality of his topics with the sincerity of his style, and in his intense expression of feelings of passionate love, of pity for the unfortunate, and of patience in the face of adversity". His frequent use of love themes in his poetry has earned him the nickname poet of love by scholars. Abdülkadir Karahan, a scholar of medieval Turkic literature, notes that what distinguished Fuzuli was his "sincerity, enthusiasm, simplicity, sensitivity, and power of expression". Alireza Asgharzadeh, an academic studying Iranian and Azerbaijani culture, describes Fuzuli's poetry as having "manifested the spirit of a profound humanism, reflecting the discontent of both the masses and the poet himself towards totalitarianism, feudal lords, and establishment religion". His poems have also been described by the literary researcher Muhsin Macit as having a "multi-layered structure" because of his "skillful use of metaphors and mystic symbols". Macit has also stated that Fuzuli's poems in Azerbaijani "have a multi-faceted structure, which, combined with perfection of expression, gives them permanence". His works show influence from Persian poets like Nizami, Jami, and Hafez, as well as Azerbaijani poets like Habibi and Nasimi.

=== Leylī va Macnūn ===
A mountain suddenly before him rose.
It was majestic in its calm repose
And awe-inspiring, for above it soared
Swift-winged falcons, and within were stored,
Deep in its bowels, such precious stones and rare
As can but be imagined. Twas not bare
Of greenery, far from it; full 'twas grown
With trees and luscious grasses, while its cone
Like brightest silver gleamed. The fowls it fed,
And many springs, and oft the dead.
And barren desert stretching nigh, a plea
Might send to it and humbly, wordlessly
Ask to be given life, for was it not
Life's very source and had it not begot
By Heaven been and granted strength and might
And rich and gorgeous beauty to delight

— "Leyli and Majnun", trans. Irina Zheleznova (Note: Original text in Arabic-script Azerbaijani: بر طاغه ایرشدی یولده ناگاه قدینه لباس و هم کوتاه سقفنده عقاب چرخ فانی مضمون کرنده لعل کانی منعم صفتی لباسی فاخر جیب و بغلی طولو جواهر دریا قیلوبن آگا تضرع ایلردی ذخیره سن توقع صحرا ایدوبن آگا تولا ایلردی معیشتن تمنا اول چشمه لر ایلیوب روانه اولمشدی اولاره آته آنه تعظیم ایله قیلمش آنی حق یاد قرآنده که الجبال اوتاد مجنون اگا ایلیوب تماشا بر اودلو سرود قلدی انشا)

Fuzuli is best known for his works in Azerbaijani, especially his ghazals (a form of love poem) and his mas̱navī Leylī va Macnūn (lit. 'Leylī and Macnūn'). Written in 1535 or 1536, (Note: While Muhsin Macit and the Turkish literature scholar İskender Pala indicate that the work was completed in 1535, the Encyclopædia Iranica and the literary scholar Salvador Faura state that it was finished in 1536.) the latter is a lyric poem that interprets the Middle Eastern story of the tragic romance between Leylī and Macnūn. Fuzuli reveals in the work that he was prompted to write it upon the request of some Ottoman poets who had accompanied Sultan Suleiman during his invasion of Baghdad. Accepting the request as a challenge, he completed the work within a year. Before beginning the work, he studied Persian versions of the story, particularly drawing inspiration from the 12th-century poet Nizami's rendition. Despite this, Fuzuli made significant changes to the narrative. For instance, while Nizami's work concludes with Majnun's death, Fuzuli's version sees the two lovers reunited in heaven and their graves transformed into türbahs.

His interpretation of the story generated more interest than previous Arabic and Persian versions, which the Turkish literature scholar İskender Pala attributes to the sincerity and lyricism of the poet's expression. The work has been described by the Encyclopædia Iranica as "the culmination of the Turk[ic] mas̱navī tradition in that it raised the personal and human love-tragedy to the plane of mystical longing and ethereal aspiration". Through his interpretation, the story of Leylī and Macnūn became widely known and Fuzuli's poem is considered one of the greatest works of Turkic literature.

=== Other Azerbaijani works ===
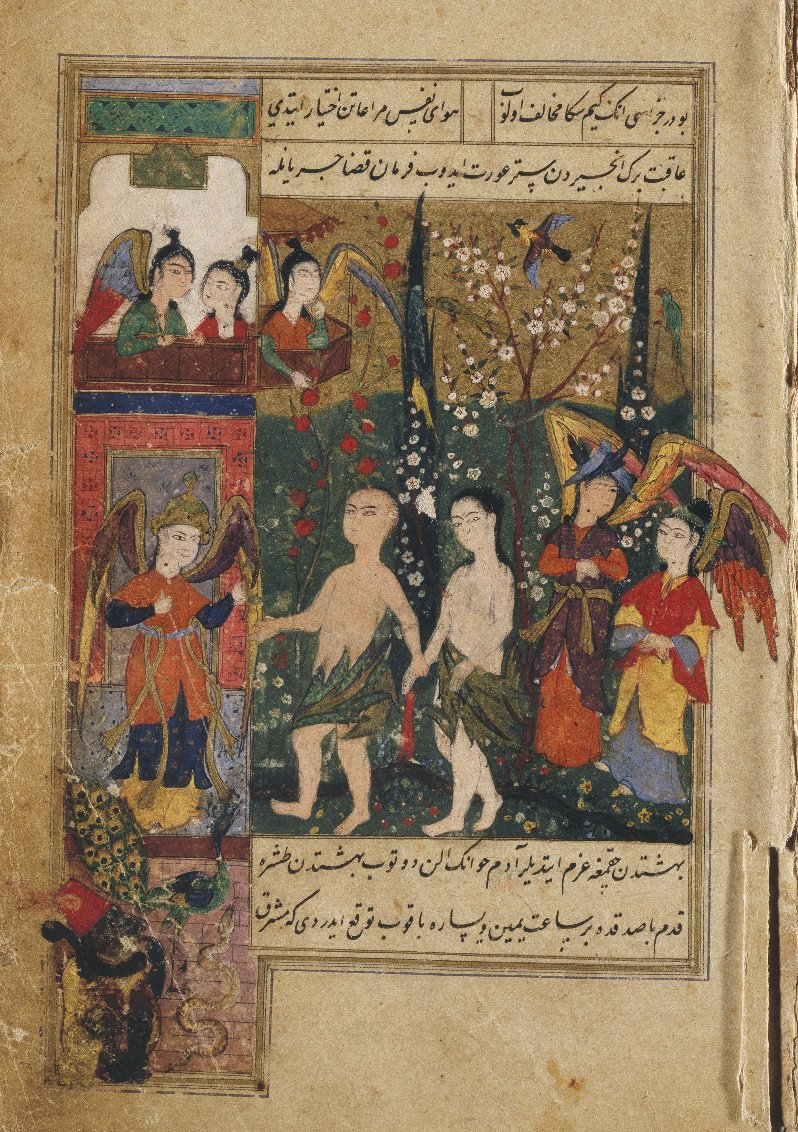
Manuscript of the Ḥadīqat al-Su'adā in the Brooklyn Museum

Another well-known work by Fuzuli is the maqtal (a poem about a historic death) Ḥadīqat al-Su'adā (lit. 'The Garden of the Blessed'), which is about the death of Husayn ibn Ali, the grandson of the Islamic prophet Muhammad, in the Battle of Karbala, which he fought in 680 CE against the second Umayyad Caliph Yazid I. In the introduction, the poet explains that while there were existing works about the battle in Arabic and Persian, there were none in a Turkic language, leaving the Turkic people deprived of this knowledge. Adapted from the 15th-century Persian poet Husayn Kashifi's Rawz̤at al-Shuhadā (lit. 'The Garden of Martyrs'), it is considered a masterpiece of the Turkic maqtal genre and is the most popular among contemporary works covering the Battle of Karbala. It was written before 1546, as library records show that the oldest available copy, the Cairo manuscript, dates back to that year.

Fuzuli was also the author of a dīvān in Azerbaijani, which is his most extensive work in this language. It comprises around 300 ghazals, 40 qaṣīdahs, 42 qiṭ'ahs (a form of monorhyme poetry), several dozen rübā'īs (four-line poems), and more. (Note: Sources disagree on the exact number of ghazals and rübā'īs in the dīvān. While Mazıoğlu and Karahan state that the dīvān contained 302 ghazals, with Mazıoğlu also providing a count of 72 rübā'īs, the Turkologist Benedek Péri states that there were 253 ghazals and 60 rübā'īs.) In the preface of his dīvān, he emphasises the importance of science to poetry, writing that without it, poetry is fleeting and compares it to a wall without a base. Karahan regards several of the qaṣīdahs in the dīvān as masterpieces, including the radif (couplet poems with same end-word) eulogies to Muhammad titled Ṣabā (lit. 'Wind'), Sū (lit. 'Water'), Gül (lit. 'Flower'), and Xancar (lit. 'Dagger'), as well as the qaṣīdah composed by Fuzuli to commemorate Sultan Suleiman's capture of Baghdad. Nonetheless, the ghazals in the dīvān were more popular. Karahan states that Fuzuli "reached the peak of lyricism, mystical love and excitement in his ghazals".

Other works by him in Azerbaijani include the allegorical-satirical poem Bang va Bādah, which is over 400 couplets long (Note: Sources disagree on the exact number of couplets in the work. Mazıoğlu writes that it consists of 444 couplets, while Péri estimates it to be around 400 couplets long. The Turkish historian Hatice Aynur states that it is 445 couplets in length, whereas Karahan provides a count of 440.) and imagines a dispute between wine and hashish over their respective merits; a translation of the Persian poet Jami's Forty Hadith titled Ḥadīs̱-i Arba'īn tarcümasī (lit. 'Translation of Forty Hadiths'); and an allegorical mas̱navī titled Ṣöḥbat al-As̱mār (lit. 'Conversation of Fruits'), which depicts vineyard fruits engaging in self-praise and arguments. Additionally, he wrote a poetic letter to Sultan Bayezid II and four others to his Ottoman officials.

=== Persian works ===
Superiority of lineage and nobility of birth are accidental.
O base man, take no pride in anything but your own virtue.
Do not lean on kinship with rulers and service of princes, or take credit for these things, as they are vain.
If the prerequisite of a craft is a sound hand, do not commit yourself to it, do not set your hopes on it!
Do not base a firm structure of hope on property and wealth, which are impermanent and transitory.
If you have a desire for lasting merit, strive for knowledge and do not be ashamed to learn.

— Persian dīvān, trans. Hamide Demirel (Note: Original text in Persian: فضیلت نسب و اصل خارج ذاتست بفضل غیر خود ای سفله افتخار مکن بانتساب سلاطین و خدمت امرا که زایلست مزن تکیه اعتبار مکن بصنعتی که درو هست شرط صحت دست مشو مقید و خود را امیدوار مکن بملک و مال که هستند زایل و ذاهب اساس بنیه امید استوار مکن اگر تراست هوای فضیلت باقی بعلم کوش و ز تحصیل علم عار مکن)

Fuzuli also wrote several works in Persian, including a dīvān that comprises 410 ghazals, 46 qiṭ'ahs, several dozen qaṣīdahs, over a hundred rübā'īs, and more. (Note: Sources disagree on the exact number of qaṣīdahs and rübā'īs in the dīvān. While Mazıoğlu states that the dīvān contained 49 qaṣīdahs and 105 rübā'īs, Karahan provides a count of 46 qaṣīdahs and 106 rübā'īs.) Karahan states that this collection of poems demonstrates that the poet's proficiency in Persian was equal to that of any classical Iranian poet. The collection opens with a prose preface, where the poet praises the merits of poetry, his enduring fascination with it, and its ability to turn pain into pleasure. In the dīvān, he shows influences from Persian poets like Hafez and Jami.

He also wrote Haft Jām (lit. 'Seven Goblets', also called Sāqīnāmah, lit. 'Book of the Cupbearer'), a seven-part mas̱navī consisting of 327 couplets, with each part focusing on a specific musical instrument. The work is notable for its mystical elements. Another Persian mas̱navī by the poet is Ṣiḥḥat va Maraz̤ (lit. 'Health and Sickness', also called Ḥusn va 'Ishq, lit. 'Beauty and Love'). It was inspired by the 15th-century Persian poet Fattahi Nishapuri's Ḥusn va Dil (lit. 'Beauty and Heart') and is an important work in demonstrating Fuzuli's knowledge of both medicine and well-being of the body and the soul. It tells the story of a dervish losing and regaining his body's health physically because of its struggle with a disease and later psychologically because of its struggle with love. Fuzuli also has a prose work in Persian titled Rind va Zāhid (lit. 'Rind and Zahid'), which describes a relationship between a father named Zāhid and his son Rind. Zāhid is trying to guide Rind to live according to Sharia (Islamic religious law) by encouraging him to attend the mosque, read the Quran, and avoid writing poetry. Rind initially resists his father's views, but ultimately chooses to accept them of his own accord.

Additionally, Fuzuli wrote Risālah-i Mu'ammīyāt (lit. 'Treatise of Riddles'), a work consisting of 190 riddle poems, and Anīs al-Qalb (lit. 'Close to the Heart'), a 134-couplet-long qaṣīdah. The latter piece is in the form of a naṣīḥatnāmah, a type of guidance letter for Ottoman sultans, that Fuzuli wrote for Sultan Suleiman. In the qaṣīdah, Fuzuli offers guidance to the Sultan on how to govern and serve the people. According to the professor of Turkic literature Hamide Demirel, Fuzuli presents the people's viewpoint towards a tyrannical ruler, presenting his opinions "in what were for the age very advanced terms" on the appropriate relationships between the populace, the Sultan, and the state. Demirel states that the language used in the work is stronger than a typical naṣīḥatnāmah and even possesses characteristics of a revolutionary manifesto. She concludes from Fuzuli's works that "he must have been no less high-minded as a man than he was great as a poet".

=== Arabic works ===
Arabic works by Fuzuli include eleven qaṣīdahs and a prose work titled Maṭla' al-I'tiqād (lit. 'The Birth of the Belief'). (Note: The full name of the work is Maṭla' al-I'tiqād fī Ma'rifat al-Mabda' wa-al-Ma'ād, which translates to "The Birth of the Belief in the Knowledge of the Start and the End".) The prose work analyses the origins and destiny of humanity according to the Islamic theological discipline ʿIlm al-Kalām. Fuzuli presents the perspectives of Greek and Muslim philosophers on these topics in the work. The only known manuscript copy is housed in the library of the Asiatic Museum in Saint Petersburg, Russia. His Arabic qaṣīdahs are believed to be fragments from a larger dīvān. All of them discuss Muhammad and his cousin and son-in-law Ali, who is also the first Shia Imam. Mazıoğlu states that Fuzuli's qaṣīdahs to Ali are indicative of his Shia devotion. The content and metaphors used in his Arabic qaṣīdahs are similar to those in his Azerbaijani and Persian ones. Mazıoğlu adds that these qaṣīdahs are "perfect in terms of expression and form", demonstrating his proficiency in the Arabic language.

== Legacy and assessment ==
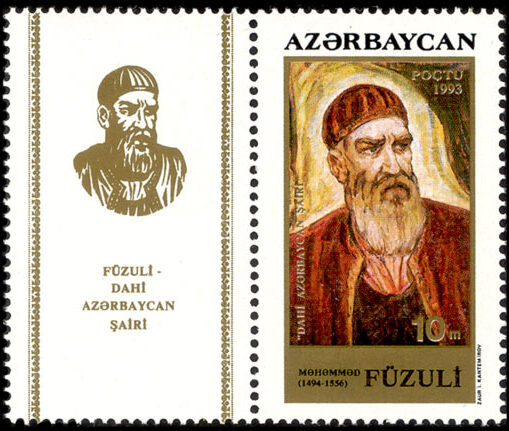
Azerbaijani stamp commemorating the 500th anniversary of Fuzuli's birth, 1994 (Note: Until the late twentieth century, Fuzuli's birth date was incorrectly considered to be 1495.)

Described by Kathleen Burrill, a professor of Turkish studies, as the "foremost of all the Azeri [Azerbaijani] poets", Fuzuli is also regarded as one of the greatest Turkic poets. He had a major influence on Azerbaijani and Ottoman literature, and is sometimes considered an Ottoman poet because he composed most of his poetry after the Ottoman conquest of Iraq. His work also had an impact on literature written in Chagatai, a Turkic literary language that was once widely spoken across Central Asia; later writers in Ottoman and Chagatai literature drew on the poet's work because of his ability to reinterpret traditional themes and ideas through his poetry, which brought the two literary traditions closer together. Bektashis consider Fuzuli to be one of the "Seven Great Poets" who lived between 14th and 16th centuries and represent Bektashi literature. (Note: According to Mazıoğlu, there is no known connection between Fuzuli and Bektashism.) His work has been characterised as a successful reconciliation of Azerbaijani, Persian, and Arabic literary practices, as well as of Shia and Sunni beliefs. He had a son who was also a poet and adopted the name Fazli in tribute to his father. (Note: Fazli means "belonging to munificence or abundance", as opposed to Fuzuli, which means "superfluous".) Fazli is believed to have received his poetic education from Fuzuli, and wrote both religious and secular poems in Azerbaijani, Persian, and Arabic.

Widely recognised and admired throughout the Turkic cultural landscape from the 16th to the 19th centuries, Fuzuli's work was famous not only in the Ottoman Empire, Iran, and Central Asia, but also in the Indian subcontinent, as indicated by Indian library catalogues. The poems were transcribed by scribes from various linguistic backgrounds using different writing systems over a vast area. Fuzuli's Leylī va Macnūn was particularly popular in India's Muslim-inhabited regions. As many Muslim Indians migrated to places like South Africa, the work's popularity spread there as well. This has elevated Fuzuli's prominence among South African Muslims, who view Leylī and Macnūn as the "Islamic equivalents of what Romeo and Juliet have stood for culturally, and literarily, in the West", as described by the literary scholar Salvador Faura. Some of Fuzuli's works have been translated into English. Ṣöḥbat al-As̱mār was translated by the Turkologist Gunnar Jarring in 1936 in Lund under the title The Contest of the Fruits, and Leylī va Macnūn was translated by the writer-translator Sofi Huri in 1970 in London under the title Leyla and Mejnun.

Fuzuli's poetry played an important role in the development of the Azerbaijani language, with the modern scholar Sakina Berengian referring to him as the "Ferdowsi and Hafez of Azeri literature", comparing him to two poets regarded as among the greatest in Persian literature, and stating that Azerbaijani poetry and language reached new heights in his writings. Karahan regarded Fuzuli as a "brilliant linguist" because of his ability to compose poetry in non-native languages without any errors in language or technique. While he drew inspiration from earlier Persian works for most of his Azerbaijani pieces, he was able to add a "particular stamp of his personality" on his interpretations of subjects, which made them popular.

The harmonious and expressive nature of Fuzuli's poems, informed by his musical knowledge, makes them suitable for setting to music. His ghazals continue to be enjoyed in Turkey, including by members of high society and performers in rural areas, where classical Turkish music merges with folk music. The first opera in the Islamic world, Leyli and Majnun, was composed by the Azerbaijani composer Uzeyir Hajibeyov in 1908 and based on Fuzuli's work of the same name. The poet's ghazals were also the subject of Fuzuli Cantata, a cantata composed by another Azerbaijani composer, Jahangir Jahangirov, in 1959.

Fuzuli remains a popular poet in countries such as Azerbaijan, Turkey, Iran, and Iraq. An administrative region and its capital city in Azerbaijan are named after him. Additionally, a street in Tabriz is named after the poet. In October 1994, the Turkish Authors' Association and Istanbul Metropolitan Municipality jointly organised an academic conference in Istanbul about Fuzuli to honour the 500th anniversary of his birth. Another conference took place in Konya in December of the same year.
