= Fuzuli Cantata =

1959 cantata by Jahangir Jahangirov

- by Jahangir Jahangirov
- Native name: Azerbaijani: Füzuli kantatası
- Composed: 1959
- Performed: April 1959

Fuzuli Cantata is a cantata composed by the musician Jahangir Jahangirov in 1959, and premiered the same year at the Azerbaijan State Opera and Ballet Theater. The work uses verses from classic Azerbaijani poet Fuzuli's ghazals and a poem by Rasul Rza dedicated to Fuzuli.

The cantata consists of three parts, starting with an introduction. Here, Jahangirov captured the atmosphere and lyrical philosophical ideas of Fuzuli's era with a high emotional tone. To achieve this, the composer skillfully used the "Rahab" mugham. In general, the spirit of Fuzuli's ghazals is reflected in the music of the cantata. At the same time, the composer achieves dramatic development through the juxtaposition of various emotional states.

Fuzuli Cantata is considered one of the finest examples of the music genre to which it belongs. Jahangir Jahangirov's cantata eclipses other works written in this genre. For nearly 500 years, Fuzuli's miracle in poetry has found its musical expression in Jahangir Jahangirov's creative work. In this work, the composer skillfully brings to life Fuzuli's ghazals "About Words", "Shabi-Hijran", and "It bored me to death" through the language of music. The composer is able to convey the feelings that Fuzuli first translated into words and skillfully enters the world of the great poet's emotions and thoughts of the 16th century. The Fuzuli Cantata is a masterpiece in the composer's work. After the cantata was first broadcast on radio and performed live, people began to appreciate this genre.

== History ==
Jahangir Jahangirov showed a greater inclination towards vocal-instrumental music and mass song genre in his creativity. Therefore, his creativity has played a major role in the development of Azerbaijani folk music and mass songs. His composed cantatas, oratorios, and suites have won the love of a wide audience.

Jahangir Jahangirov's "Fuzuli" cantata brought him great fame. The first cantata in Azerbaijan was created by Uzeyir Hajibeyov in 1934. This cantata was dedicated to the 1000th anniversary of the ancient Eastern philosopher-poet Ferdowsi. Later in 1938, Gara Garayev composed Azerbaijan's second cantata, "Heart Song." The third cantata was created by Jovdat Hajiyev, and this tradition was continued by Rauf Hajiyev and Niyazi. At this time, Jahangir Jahangirov also gave a gift to this tradition and created the "Fuzuli" cantata.

Later, Jahangir Jahangirov continued his style with young composers, and ten years before his "Fuzuli" cantata, he wrote a vocal-symphonic poem called On the Other Side of Araz for soloist, choir, and symphonic orchestra. Jahangirov was not yet twenty-eight years old when he finished this poem. This work was received in the USSR, especially in the capital, Moscow, as a "great poetic thought" and evaluated as a "great masterpiece." Jahangirov wrote folk songs and miniature pieces until his next cantatas. Finally, in 1956, the composer signed the "Song about Friendship" cantata, which was a great success. Three years later, Jahangir Jahangirov wrote the "Fuzuli" cantata.

The "Fuzuli" cantata was written at the beginning of 1959. Jahangir Jahangirov's sister, Roza, remembered the days when he wrote the "Fuzuli" cantata and noted,

I remember the days when Jahangir wrote the "Fuzuli" cantata. He worked until morning and had a very beautiful voice himself. He practiced with enthusiasm at home. He knew Fuzuli's poems by heart. Finding a second person who could appreciate the beauty of his poetry was difficult. He would talk about Fuzuli's poems tirelessly. After the cantata was written, it was received with great interest. Jahangir invited all the composers, friends, and acquaintances he organized to the reception.

The "Fuzuli" cantata was first performed at a festive night dedicated to the 400th anniversary of the poet's memory in April 1959 at the Azerbaijan State Opera and Ballet Theater. The work won first place in that competition. After the cantata was first broadcast and aired on the radio, people started to like this genre. The cantata consists of three parts, and there is almost no thematic musical connection between these parts. The ghazal couplets that depend on the music character of each part dictate a kind of structure for the work. Such usage leads to the creation and development of free form. The cantata, rich in literary-aesthetic and folk music performers, became popular in Azerbaijan shortly after its presentation.

== Lyrics ==
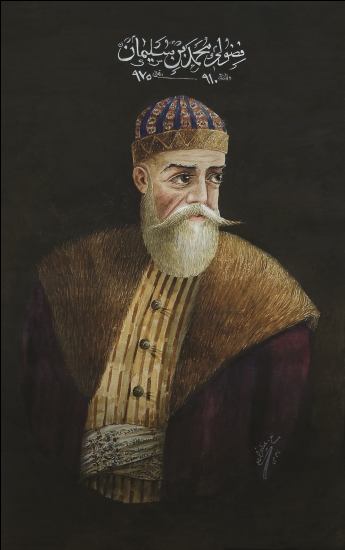
Portrait of Fuzuli, taken by Azim Azimzade in 1914, is kept in the Azerbaijan National Art Museum. The composer used five ghazals of the poet.

Jahangir Jahangirov used a melody from the poems of Fuzuli and a verse from Rasul Rza's poem dedicated to Fuzuli in the finale of his composition "Fuzuli Kantatasi". Fuzuli's poems have been the poetic basis of mugham composition since the 16th century, creating an inseparable connection between words and music. The spiritual and physical beauty, character development, hard work, courage, and other beautiful human qualities form the essence of the poet's works.

Before starting work on the composition, the composer studied Fuzuli's diwans, including the Leyli and Majnun poem, and then decided to use the "Söz", "Ney kimi", "Məni candan usandırdı", "Ol pərivəş" poems from this great collection and the Qazeli-Ustad poems from the Leyli and Majnun poem's "Bu Məcnuna anası pənd verdiyidir və Bustani məlamətdən xari-nədamət dərdiyidir" section.

== Music ==
A cantata is a broad and detailed musical work that is not necessarily connected. Small poems, such as couplets or ordinary three-part forms, are considered to be the poetic basis of the cantata. The emotional character of the cantata is mainly lyrical. The philosophical idea and belief of the work is represented by generalized emotional images created by the composer. One of the characteristics of Jahangir Jahangirov's musical language, which is characteristic of the composer, is the expression of transmission. This feature is reflected in the clear music expression of the first and second sections of the cantata without hesitation and with ease of movement. The introduction also recalls the tonal support of folk musical instruments performers.

The composer, in the first section of the cantata named "Söz" (The Word), which leads the listener to the world of Fuzuli's images, talks about the richness of the word through music and tries to reveal the power of the word to show the joy, pain, and deep emotions of human thoughts. The author emphasizes the delicate, subtle nature of the literary content through chord harmony and orchestral means (the comparison of major and minor, the branches of mugham, the variety of orchestral groups and nuances, the contrast of forte and piano). To express the figurative language of the text, the composer tries to focus on various melodic movements and polyphonic writing as well.

The lyrical-philosophical state of mind of the first section obtains the characteristic of dramatics with its emotional intensity. The meter used in the poems is also noted in the music. The accurate distribution of accents, which is a key element of the meter, enables the improvisational finiteness of the musical expressions through the repetition of each couplet.

In the second section, the soloist's lyrical-sorrowful song "Məni candan usandırdı" (She made me tired of life) plays a leading role in creating the image of the poet who is missing his beloved. In the middle section, which constitutes the climax, the soloist conducts a dialogue in a unique style that starts with the expression "Shabi-Hijran" (The night of sorrow). The free-flowing, sincere melody's harmony is noted with the unison of the choir and orchestra.

In the section of the cantata, the influence of mugham styles in the development of melody and music is particularly noticeable, and Jahangir Jahangirov skillfully uses them. The development of Lad sections frequently returns to the tonic beat in succession. For example, the music starts in the key of B♭ minor in the Shur mugham. Then it passes through the key of A♭ Shahnaz and after the key of E♭ Rast, it returns to B♭ Shur and A♭ Shahnaz again.

In the central climax section of the cantata, the culmination section of Bayati-Kurd coincides with the culmination section of Shur, which takes its source from mugham. The principle of variant diversity, which takes its source from mugham, creates a certain degree of bilateral development sensation.

The second section is written in a three-part form. Thus, all sections are closely related to each other in terms of intonation. Two factors contribute to this connection: the first factor is that each new section is grasped as a development variant of the previous section, and the second factor is the theme that plays the role of the leitmotif in the combination of all sections. This theme is heard for the first time in the orchestral introduction of the second section, then in the chorus and in the soloist's performance.

This theme to some extent also enters the third section. The third section of the cantata expresses feelings such as nobility and spiritual elevation in humans through love. The outer parts of the finale (the third section is also three-part) are lyrical. They seem to continue the previously made lyrical lines of the cantata. The cantata is concluded with a small fugue-like coda dedicated to Fuzuli based on the poem of Razul Rza. In this coda, J. Jahangirov's mastery of the fugue texture is manifested. Naturally, the polyphony used extensively by the composer is dictated by a certain poetic content in various versions of the text.

Tahir Abbasli, who talked about Jahangir Jahangirov's "Fuzuli" cantata, noted this:

The magnificent cantata by 38-year-old Jahangir Jahangirov overturns the idea held by the staunch guardians of his time that "diversity is a foreign element to Azerbaijani music". He himself, being named after someone else, composed this music in a genre called "xor", which our grandparents used to frown upon. This was a time when terms like "opera", "ballet", "suite", and "capriccio" had not yet fully entered our lexicon. In this cantata, one can feel the composer's profound sadness and longing, as well as his victorious and triumphant rhythms. Sometimes, through his interviews with the press and his appearances on television and radio, we learn that the author himself gave more importance to the elements I mentioned earlier while working on this piece. In other words, he broke away from the mono-culturalism of Ashiq Cunun and performed a very necessary task for our nation, which has difficulty coming to a national consensus, by incorporating various reasons (such as the "atüstü" pentatonic scale, the religious elegiac and commemorative elements in its seating arrangements, and the "forty days and forty nights" regulation in its epic narrative) into his work.

=== Special features of Lad mode ===
==== First part ====
The introduction of one part of the three-part cantata consists of two sections. In the first section, a quotation from the "Rahab" mugham is used as a simple polyphonic expression through the orchestra. After the intonations of the "Rahab" mugham are performed, as if completing the theme of this section, the second section begins with a new rhythmic melody. Researcher N. Mirzayeva noted that this section consists of two preludes.

The sections following the introduction are structured in an a+b+a1+b1 form for the "Söz" poem, and in a c+d+c form for the "Ney kimi" poem, incorporating verses from each. According to Qaniyev, the first section of the introduction is Ad libitum, the second section is Andante, and the section with the "Söz" poem is Meno Mosso, with tempos of 6/8, 2/4, 3/4, and 4/4, and nuances such as poco piu mosso, ritenuto, espressivo, crescendo, diminuendo, p, pp, ppp, f, ff, and fff being used. The section with the "Ney kimi" poem starts with a Maestoso nuance, and has a 4/4 meter and E♭ major tonality. This section features nuances such as mf, f, ff, espressivo, poco piu mosso, largo con forzo, crescendo, and diminuendo.

This section consists of two parts, where part c is performed by solo instruments with a soft and delicate sound, while part d is performed by the full symphonic orchestra. During the reprisal of part c, there are clear polyphonic elements in the orchestral sound. A characteristic feature of the end of both parts is a fermata sign. This section is used in the form of a+b+a1+b1+c+d+c.

In this section, both melodic and monodic passages require skill from both the conductor and the orchestral performers. The variation in rhythm in the orchestral introduction of the "Rahab" mugham and subsequent variations in tonality and meter in subsequent performances enrich the technical rules of conducting. After the entry of the sinop female chorus, the conductor ensures the extension of the bass voices, and at this time, the tenor voices reveal mixed, hidden melodies with accents in 3/4.

==== Second part ====
The second part of the cantata combines extensive musical ideas. Here, after the orchestral introduction, the development of complete melodic lines from Fuzuli's poem "Meni candan usandirdi" is used. The composer successfully creates a complex three-part form with independent musical themes in this section. Before sections A and B, an introductory passage is played by the orchestra, and after their repetition, the coda emerges. Here, section A is expressed with the first verse of the poem "Meni candan usandirdi", section B with the second and third verses, and section C with the fourth verse and the solo performance of the male chorus. The culmination in this section is given with the participation of the male chorus with the first line of the fourth verse in section C. The reappearance of sections A and B creates an entrance to the coda by repeating the previous sections.

In the repeated A and B sections, the fifth, sixth, and seventh couplets of the poem are used. The coda emerges with the last line of the seventh couplet. Here, the tenor and bass voices in the male chorus are presented in a polyphonic question-and-answer imitation form. This section maintains a Moderato tempo and 4/4 meter until the end. Dynamics such as pp, ppp, f, ff, ritenuto, crescendo, and accents are encountered. The tonality of this section is in B minor, and the principle of polytonality is also present. After a short agogic pause, the male chorus and the alto solo complete this section.

This passage describes an instrumental section of the composition where the dynamics shift from f to a more mournful melody. The passage is characterized by a flute passage featuring duodecimo figures, which is executed with precision by both the performer and the conductor. When the soloist, the male singer, enters, the orchestra accompanies him with syncopated notes and the performance includes triplets and sextuplets. The conductor's goal during the interchange between the soloist and the male choir is to accurately convey the artistic and aesthetic imagery of the piece.

==== Third part ====
The third part of the cantata is given by the composer as a fiery finale. Researcher N. Mirzayeva has divided this section into two parts and explained it in five sections based on its content:

1. Instrumental introduction, chorus, vocalization
2. Meno mosso with unison chorus for the first verse of the poem and an orchestral interlude
3. Moderato mixed-style introduction: orchestral-choral-vocalization
4. In the tutti section, a band of Rza's poem "Come from the Suffering of Time" is used for the chorus and orchestra. The text's four lines are based on the a–a–b–b principle, while the last two lines are based on the b material.
5. In the coda, the phrase "Great Master" is used.

Despite starting in Allegro tempo, changes in Meno mosso and Moderato tempo are encountered in this section. The use of contrast nuances plays a big role in the dramatization of the themes. Here, nuances such as p, pp, ppp, f, ff, sf, ritenuto, diminuendo, crescendo are used interchangeably. In addition to the diversity of tempo and nuances, changing meters such as 2/4, 3/4, 4/4, 6/8, 6/4 are also employed.

The third movement of the cantata is in the key of G♯ minor. The orchestral introduction to the movement is rich in melodic and monodic passages. It is expressed in three parts: introduction, instrumental introduction, and choral passage. In the second measure of the introduction, there is a modulation to the key of C♯ minor, and after a glissando, the instrumental connecting section up to Meno mosso shows a modulation to the key of C major. The tenor's solo from Meno mosso to Espresivo and the response of the female choir are expressed in a twelve-measure period with the verse "Do not give your soul to love, for love is a disease of the soul."

The verses of the poem "Gel ey dövrün cəfasından" by the poet Rəsul Rza are used as the culmination of both this section and the entire cantata. The first two verses create the thematic material for the aa section, while the third and fourth verses create a new thematic material for the bb section. At the end of the section, the unison choir singing in high notes is extended to four bars in 4/4 time and the first beat of the next bar.

The dramatic line in the work is derived from the poetic images and is reflected in the melodies created by the composer based on mugam intonations. The use of melodic and rhythmic elements within the framework of the color of folk music has had a serious impact on its harmony.

== Performance and orchestration ==
In 1959, the Azerbaijan State Symphony Orchestra, the Azerbaijan State Choir, and under the performance of Shovkat Alakbarova, the work was fully performed for the first time at the Azerbaijan State Opera and Ballet Theater. Journalist Flora Khalilzadeh noted this:

Jahangir Jahangirov's "Fuzuli" cantata stood out for its content, tonality, emotional depth, and the improvisational motifs of mugham. Especially, the beautiful voice and pleasant breath of Shovkat Alakbarova further enhanced the possibilities of expressing the deep emotions, joy and sorrow of the cantata. For almost 60 years, Jahangir Jahangirov's "Fuzuli" cantata has been captivating the hearts of the listeners and touching their emotions.

Later on, the cantata was rarely performed in its entirety, and its second part became more famous. In the 1960s, the second part of the cantata was performed by Shovkat Alakbarova and recorded. In the 1970s, the second part of the cantata was recorded by Rashid Behbudov.

In 2009, the second part of the second movement of the cantata was recorded and a music video was produced by Nadir Qafarzade. In 2015, the second part of the cantata was performed by Laleh Mammadova and a music video was produced on the stage of the Azerbaijan State Academic Musical Theater. The song has also been performed by Güllü Muradova (2011), Farghana Qasimova (2016), Nuriyya Huseynova (2010), Shahnaz Hashimova (2018, with the support of the Gence State Philharmonic Folk Instruments Orchestra), and others.

== See also ==
- Muslim Magomayev
- Vagif Mustafazadeh
