= Ahmed Rushdi Mostari =

Ottoman-Bosnian poet (1637–1699/1700)

Ahmed Rushdi Mostari (also spelled Ahmad Roshdi, with Rushdi/Roshdi being his sobriquet; 1637–1699/1700) was a Bosniak Mevlevi poet from Mostar. The son of a certain Abdullah, at a young age, he moved to Constantinople (modern-day Istanbul), where he attended a palace page-school (becoming an ʿajemi oghlan). He later became a teacher (mudarres), before withdrawing from public service and becoming the manager of a bookshop. Rushdi's reputation stems from his talent as a gifted poet, and in particular one who wrote about philosophical imagination and symbolism pertaining to Sufism. He authored a divan, in which, amongst others, are three ghazals and one qet'a in Persian. Rushdi's poetry is written in the "Indian style" and is noted for its heavy melancholy, being related to the death and burial of his only son.
