= Rena Efendizade =

Azerbaijani architect (born 1929)

Rena Efendizade Rəna Əfəndizadə
- Born: November 29, 1929 (age 96); Baku, Azerbaijan SSR, USSR
- Occupation: Architect
- Awards

Rena Mahmud gizi Efendizade (Azerbaijani: Rəna Mahmud qızı Əfəndizadə; born November 29, 1929) is an Azerbaijani architect, Honored Architect of the Azerbaijan SSR.

== Biography ==
Rena Efendizade was born on November 29, 1929, in Baku. In 1954 she graduated from Moscow Architectural Institute. In 1963 she started working at the Institute of Architecture and Art of the Azerbaijan National Academy of Sciences. From 1989 to 1998 she headed the department of urban planning and modern architecture. In 1967 she defended her dissertation. For a long time she was a member of the board of the Union of Architects of Azerbaijan.

Rena Efendizade is the author of a number of residential projects. She is the author of more than 50 works on architecture and urban planning of Azerbaijan and Baku and 5 monographs.

== Awards ==
- Honored Architect of the Azerbaijan SSR — December 5, 1979
- Order of the Badge of Honour — 1986
- Shohrat Order — April 19, 2000
- Medal named after Mikayil Useynov — 2012
- 2nd degree Labor Order — November 28, 2019
