= Seven Great Poets =

List of symbolic poets in Alevi culture

In Turkish culture, the Seven Great Poets or Seven Great Ozans (Turkish: Yedi Ulu Ozan) are seven ozans (singer-poets) who lived between 14th and 16th century that represent Alevi/Bektashi poetry and literature.

== Background ==
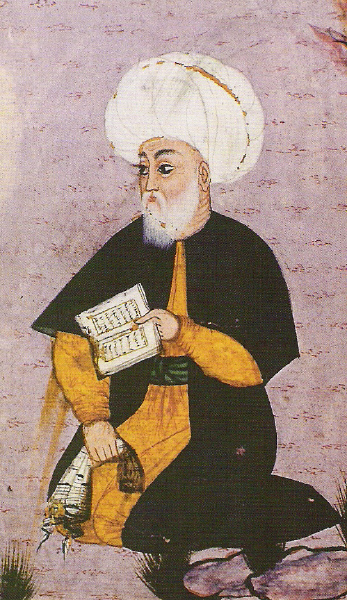
Fuzûlî.

Seven Ulu Ozan are the poets who gave their works mostly in Turkish language, although they knew languages such as Arabic and Persian, which enlighten the people about the political problems of the period. According to the belief, for the struggle for the sake of the Alevi faith and the persecution they endured, as well as the content that attracted people in their literary works influenced all Ozans that came after them.

== List of Seven Great Poets ==
- Imadaddin Nasimi (14th century)
- Yemînî (15th century)
- Fuzûlî (16th century)
- Ismail Khatai (16th century)
- Virani (16th century)
- Pir Sultan Abdal (16th century)
- Kul Himmet (16th century)
