= Bərgüşad =

- Municipality
- Location within Azerbaijan
- Coordinates: 40°24′11″N 47°50′58″E
- Country: Azerbaijan
- District: Ujar

Population
  - Total: 5,803
- Time zone: UTC+4 (AZT)

Bərgüşad (Bargushad) is a village and municipality in the Ujar District of Azerbaijan. It has a population of 5,803.

== Notable natives ==
- Habibi (poet) - 15th and 16th centuries Azerbaijani poet
