= Fazli (poet) =

Azerbaijani poet, c. 1543–1605

- Born: Fazli Chalabi Fuzulizade c. 1543; Karbala
- Died: 1605
- Occupation: Poet
- Parent: Fuzuli
- Writing career
- Language: Azerbaijani, Persian, Arabic

Fazli Chalabi Fuzulizade (Azerbaijani: Fəzli Çələbi Füzulizadə, فضلی چلبی فضولی زاده; c. 1543–1605), commonly known as Fazli (Fəzli, فضلی), was a 16th-century poet. He wrote in Azerbaijani, Persian, and Arabic and was the son of the major Azerbaijani-speaking poet Fuzuli. Fazli was best known for his talent in creating chronograms and riddles within his poems.

== Name ==
Fazli's full name was Fazli Chalabi Fuzulizade. His pen name, Fazli, means "belonging to munificence or abundance" and is likely a tribute to his father, the poet Fuzuli, whose pen name means "superfluous".

== Biography ==
Born in Karbala, Fazli's exact date of birth is uncertain, but it must have been before 1556 when his father died. The 16th–century Ottoman poet and bibliographer Ahdi's Tezkire (a bibliographical dictionary of poetry) in 1563/64 described him as a mature poet, suggesting that he was born around 1543. Fazli received much of his poetic education from his father. Ahdi described Fazli as an intelligent and contented person. He also noted that Fazli was more interested in secular knowledge than religious studies. It is generally accepted that Fazli died in 1605.

== Poetry ==
Fazli is recognised as a minor poet due to the limited amount and quality of his work. He wrote verses in Azerbaijani, Persian, and Arabic in the aruz form (poetry using quantifying prosody). His poetry is characterized by a notable degree of creativity. In one of his qitas (a form of monorhyme poetry), he expresses support for Sunni beliefs and opposition to Qizilbash views. Fazli is most renowned for his skill in creating chronograms and riddles within his poems. His qoshma (non-religious verse form) poems are also believed to have inspired later Turkic poets from Azerbaijan.

== Sources ==
- Hess, Michael R. (2015). "Fazli". In Fleet, Kate; Krämer, Gudrun; Matringe, Denis; Nawas, John; Rowson, Everett (eds.). Encyclopaedia of Islam (3rd ed.). Brill Online. doi:10.1163/1573-3912_ei3_COM_27073. ISSN 1873-9830.
- Karahan, Abdülkadir (1996). "FUZÛLÎ". TDV Encyclopedia of Islam, Vol. 13 (Fikih – Gelenek) (in Turkish). Istanbul: Presidency of Religious Affairs, Centre for Islamic Studies. ISBN 978-975-389-440-1.
- Kılıç, Filiz (2014). "FAZLÎ, Fuzûlî-zâde Fazlî Çelebi". Türk Edebiyatı İsimler Sözlüğü (in Turkish). Ahmet Yesevi University.
- "Məhəmməd Füzulinin oğlu Fəzlinin şeirləri tapılıb". AzerTAC. 4 January 2018.
- Yarshater, Ehsan, ed. (2000). "FOŻŪLĪ, MOḤAMMAD". Encyclopædia Iranica. Vol. X/2: Forūḡī–Fruit. London and New York: Routledge & Kegan Paul. pp. 121–122. ISBN 978-0-933273-41-2.
