= Habibi (poet) =

Azerbaijani poet (born 1470)

- Born: 1470; Bərgüşad (now part of Azerbaijan)
- Died: 1519/20; Constantinople, Ottoman Empire
- Occupation: Poet
- Writing career
- Language: Azerbaijani, Turkish

Habibi (Azerbaijani: Həbibi, حبیبی; 1470–1519/1520) was a late 15th- and early 16th-century poet. He is regarded as the most important Azerbaijani poet of his generation.

Habibi spent the early years of his life in the court of Aq Qoyunlu ruler Yaqub Beg, where he began writing his first poems. In 1502, he became a Safavid court poet, earning the title "king of poets" from Safavid king Ismail I. His works were written in his native Azerbaijani language and dealt with topics like love, alcohol, Hurufism and Sufism. He influenced major later poets, including Fuzuli, and had a significant influence on the development of Azerbaijani literature. Habibi spent his final years in Anatolia, where he died in 1519 or 1520.

== Life ==
Habibi was born in the village of Bərgüşad in 1470 (now part of the Ujar District of Azerbaijan) to a poor Azerbaijani family. He was a pious Hurufi and a Shia Muslim. During his childhood, he worked as a shepherd. According to the Safavid prince Sam Mirza, while out shepherding one day, Habibi encountered the Aq Qoyunlu ruler Yaqub Beg, who was on a hunting trip and took him under his patronage because of his genius. Habibi wrote his first poems while living in the Aq Qoyunlu palace during Yaqub Beg's reign.

From 1490, the year Yaqub Beg died, to 1502, Habibi's life is unknown. He became a Safavid court poet in 1502, and the Safavid king Ismail I (1487–1524), who was himself a poet, dubbed him malekoʾsh-shoʿarā (or māliku sh-shuʿarā, lit. 'king of poets'). In all likelihood, he came to the Ottoman capital of Constantinople (modern-day Istanbul) in 1514, perhaps as an outcome of the capture of Tabriz, the then Safavid capital, by Selim I. According to the academic Hamid Arasly (1902–1983), Habibi was one of 1700 artists brought to Constantinople by Ottoman Sultan Selim I after the capture of Tabriz in 1514. The depiction of Habibi as Selim I's courtier by Evliya Çelebi suggests that the sultan, who was very interested in Turkish and Persian literature, may have shielded him from Shah Ismail, who could have been upset at the poet for leaving the Safavid court.

Habibi is said to have died during the reign of Selim I, but the exact date is uncertain. According to Evliya Çelebi, he was buried in the Caferabad tekke in Sütlüce, Constantinople. The Encyclopedia Iranica and the Encyclopedia of Islam note that the poet died in 1519, while the Great Soviet Encyclopedia and the Meydan Larousse Encyclopedia give his death date as 1520.

== Poetry ==
The majority of Habibi's work has been lost, with only 40 works remaining. Given his fame during his lifetime, it is possible that he wrote a divan (collection of short poems) before coming to Anatolia. The language used in Habibi's poems, which may be classified as simply Azerbaijani, accompanied by numerous characteristic Persian elements, also displays Chagatai influence. His poems have been described as straightforward and heartfelt. There are topics related to Hurufism in Habibi's poems, and he wrote amorous and Sufi-philosophical poems with lively and bright metaphors. Habibi was one of the most important Azerbaijani poets of his time. According to the Turkish scholar Mehmet Fuat Köprülü, he represented a transitional period between Nasimi, Khatai (the pen name of Safavid Shah Ismail), and Fuzuli, the three poets regarded as among the greatest in Azerbaijani literature. Habibi's poems influenced those of Khatai and Fuzuli amongst others.

Habibi was greatly influenced by Nasimi, an Azerbaijani poet from the 14th century, and to a lesser extent by the Ottoman poets Şeyhî, Ahmed Pasha and Khalili. Love, alcohol, sajdah to Adam, and spiritual themes such as reaching unity with God are the most important concepts in Habibi's poems. In addition, in his poetry he ridicules the religious establishment. He also wrote poems in Anatolian Turkish and paid close attention to the structure of his poems, particularly the correctness of the rhymes, though he occasionally used Anatolian Turkish incorrectly and could not match the level of mastery of verse technique of Ottoman poets. The fact that 16th-century poets such as Çâkerî Sinan Çelebi, Sâfâyî Çelebi, Celâlzâde Mustafa Çelebi, Hayâtî Çelebi and Tutmacı wrote nazires (poems written in the same form and rhyme as the poems of another poet) to Habibi demonstrates his importance in the Ottoman poetry field.

Although Habibi learnt to write poetry in Anatolian Turkish, the Ottoman biographer and poet Aşık Çelebi (died 1572) still deemed Habibi's poetry as belonging to the Iranian (Tur. 'ajemane) style, rather than the Ottoman style, and mentioned that his poetry didn't suit the contemporaneous poetic trends.

== Legacy ==
Habibi was apparently popular for some time during his own life and afterwards. This can be inferred from the fact that Fuzuli wrote a mukhammas (a poetic style where each paragraph contains five lines) deduced from the matla (first couplet of a ghazal, a form of amatory poem) of one of Habibi's own ghazals. Habibi influenced many future poets and played a great role in the development of Azerbaijani literature. In spite of this, he is virtually entirely forgotten today, with only a handful of his poems having survived to this day, which in turn has been credited in part to Fuzuli and the Ottoman poet Bâkî (died 1600), who surpassed him in popularity shortly after his death.
