= Fazli =

Fazli (Persian: فضلی) may refer to:

== Given name ==
- Fazli (poet) (c. 1543–1605), Azerbaijani poet
- Fazli Husain (1877–1936), Pakistani politician
- Fazlı Teoman Yakupoğlu, Turkish rock singer

== Surname ==
- Fereydoon Fazli, Iranian footballer
- Nida Fazli, Indian lyricist
- Samir Fazli, Albanian-Macedonian footballer
- Osman Fazli, Turkish Sufi

== Other uses ==
- Fazli (mango), a mango cultivar
