= Jahangir Jahangirov =

Azerbaijani Soviet composer (1921–1992)

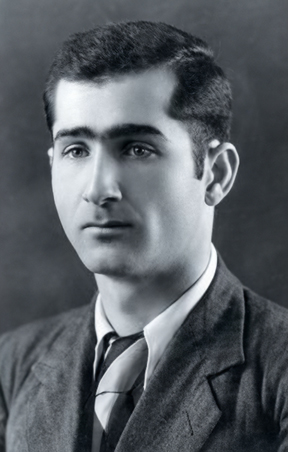
Jahangir Jahangirov in the early 1940s

Jahangir Jahangirov wrote National Anthem of Azerbaijan People Government

Jahangir Shirgasht oglu Jahangirov (Azerbaijani: Cahangir Şirgəşt oğlu Cahangirov; 20 July 1921 – 25 March 1992) was a Soviet and Azerbaijani composer, conductor and choirmaster; he was named People's Artiste of the Azerbaijan SSR in 1964.

== Biography ==
Jahangir Jahangirov was born on 20 July 1921 in Balakhany township of Baku, Azerbaijan Democratic Republic. He graduated from musical school named after Asaf Zeynally and then from Baku Academy of Music. From 1944 to 1960, he led the choir of Broadcasting Committee of the Azerbaijan SSR. Majority of songs, composed by him for the first time were played by the chorus, which he led. After that he was the artistic director of the Song and Dance Ensemble at Azerbaijan State Philharmonic Hall. In 1950, Jahangir Jahangirov was awarded the USSR State Prize, and in 1963, he received the status of People's Artist of the Azerbaijan SSR.

== Compositions ==
In 1946, Mir Mehdi Etimad wrote the words of the hymn of the Azerbaijan People's Government, Jahangir Jahangirov composed a song to it. Jahangir Jahangirov is the author of a lot of famous musical compositions. On the other side of Araz (1949) vocal-symphonic poem, A Song about Friendship (1956), Fuzuli (1959), Nasimi (1973) suites, Sabir (1962), Huseyn Javid-59 (1984), Great Victory (1985) (dedicated to the 40th anniversary of the victory in Great Patriotic War) oratorios, Azad (1957), Khananda’s Fortune (1978) operas are among them. Besides that, the composer composed music for films Indomitable Kura, Koroglu, and Unsubdued Battalion.

== See also ==
- List of People's Artistes of the Azerbaijan SSR
