= Fattahi Nishapuri =

Persian poet and calligrapher

Muhammad ibn Yahya Sibak Nishapuri (Persian: محمد بن یحیی سیبک نیشاپوری), commonly known as Fattahi Nishapuri (فتاحی نیشاپوری; "Fattahi" was his pen name; died 1448), was a Persian poet and calligrapher in the Timurid Empire. A native of the city of Nishapur, he was one of the leading poets and calligraphers at the court of the Timurid ruler Shah Rukh (r. 1405–1447).

== Sources ==
- Meneghini, Daniela (2020). "Fattāḥī Nīshāpūrī". In Fleet, Kate; Krämer, Gudrun; Matringe, Denis; Nawas, John; Rowson, Everett (eds.). Encyclopaedia of Islam (3rd ed.). Brill Online. ISSN 1873-9830.
- Yazici, Tahsın (1999). "Fattāḥī Nīšābūrī". In Yarshater, Ehsan (ed.). Encyclopædia Iranica. Vol. IX/4: Fārs II–Fauna III. London and New York: Routledge & Kegan Paul. pp. 427–427. ISBN 978-0-933273-32-0.
