= Ahmad Al Fadhli =

Kuwaiti footballer

Personal information
- Full name: Ahmad Al Fadhli
- Date of birth: September 6, 1982 (age 44)
- Place of birth: Kuwait City, Kuwait
- Height: 1.80 m (5 ft 11 in)
- Position: Goalkeeper

Senior career*
Years	Team	Apps	(Gls)
2006–2011	Kazma	31	(0)
2011	Salalah	2	(0)
2011–2020	Al Qadsia	48	(0)
2020–2022	Al-Yarmouk	9	(0)

International career^{‡}
2008	Kuwait	1	(0)
- * Club domestic league appearances and goals as of October 16, 2010 ‡ National team caps and goals as of October 16, 2010

Ahmad Al Fadhli (Arabic: أحمد الفضلي, born 6 September 1982) is a Kuwaiti footballer who is a goalkeeper for Al-Yarmouk SC.
