= Nizami Museum of Azerbaijani Literature =

Museum in Baku, Azerbaijan

Coordinates: 40°22′12″N 49°50′11″E

National museum of Azerbaijan literature named after Nizami Ganjavi
- Nizami Gəncəvi adına Milli Azərbaycan ədəbiyyatı muzeyi
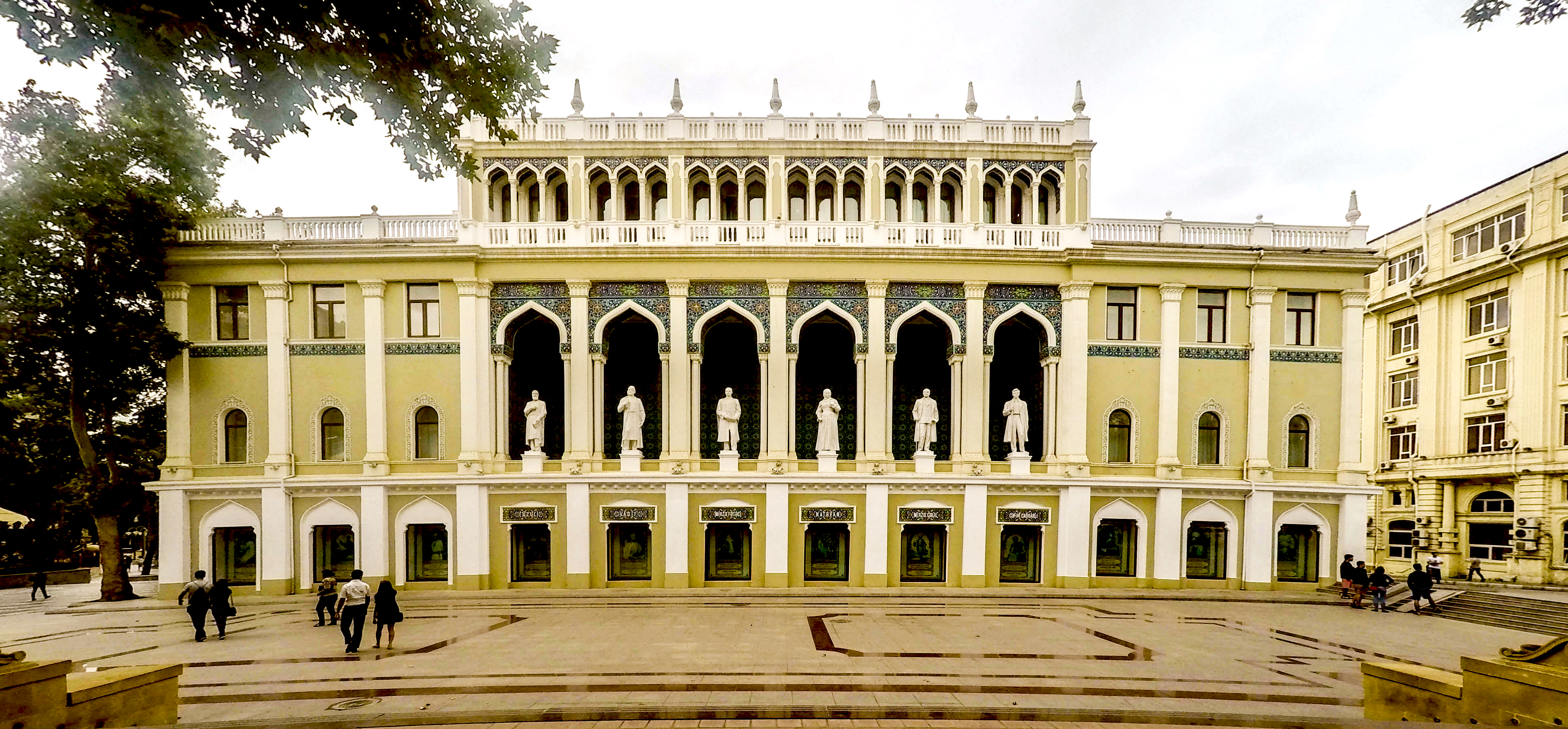
- Established: 1939
- Location: Azerbaijan, Baku, Istiglaliyyat Street 53
- Director: Rafael Baba oglu Huseynov
- Public transit access: M 1 Icheri Sheher metro station
- Website: nizamimuseum.az

The National museum of Azerbaijan literature, named after Nizami Ganjavi (Azerbaijani: Nizami Gəncəvi adına Milli Azərbaycan ədəbiyyatı muzeyi) is a museum in Baku, established in 1939. It is located near the entrance of Icheri Sheher, not far from the Fountains Square. The museum is considered one of the greatest and richest treasuries of Azerbaijani culture.

== Main goals ==
The main goal of the museum is the collection, research and storage of scientific and other materials about Azerbaijani literature and culture and the presentation of these materials in expositions and exhibitions. The museum also carries out scientific research and publishes books and monographs.

== History of the museum ==
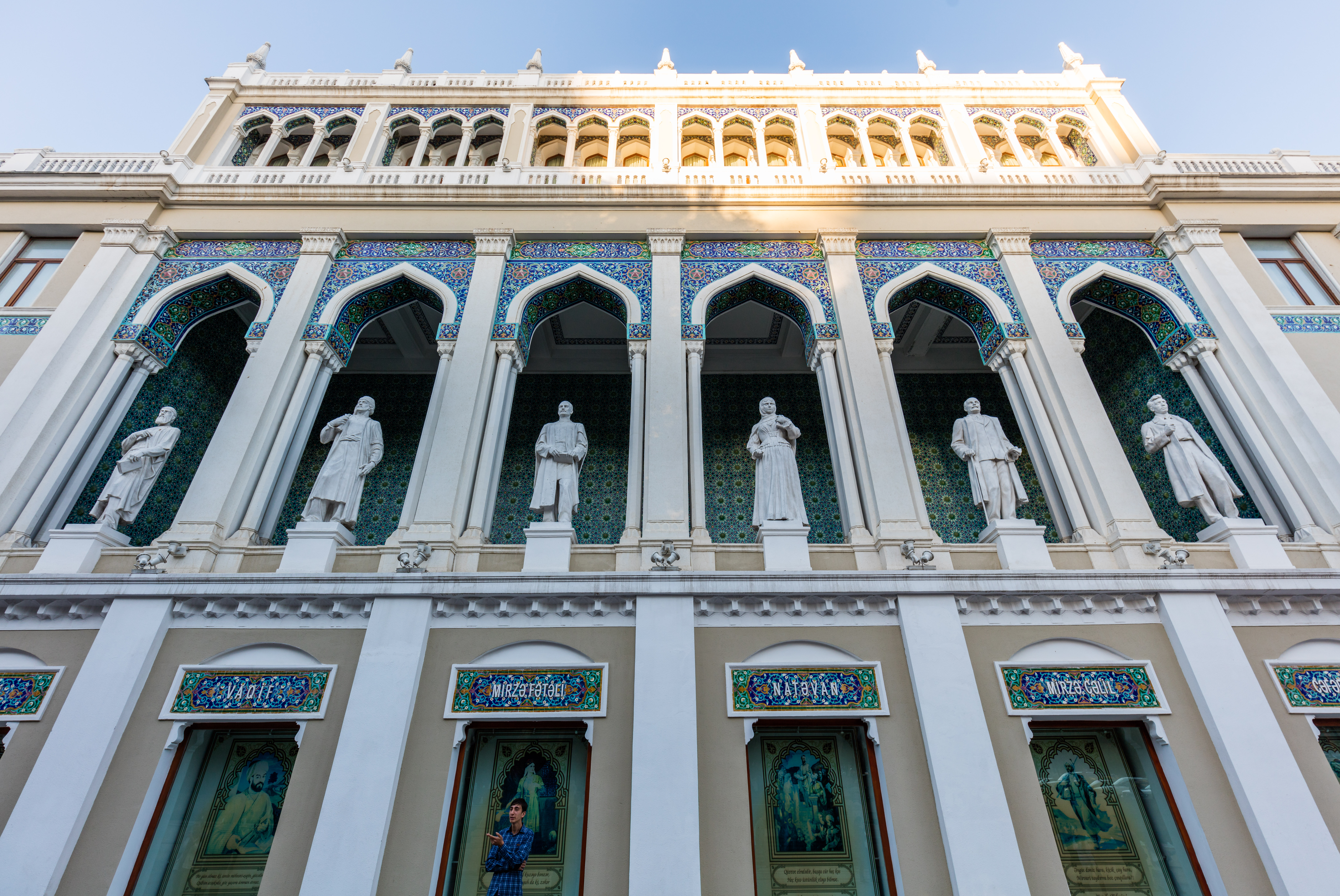
View from the bottom.

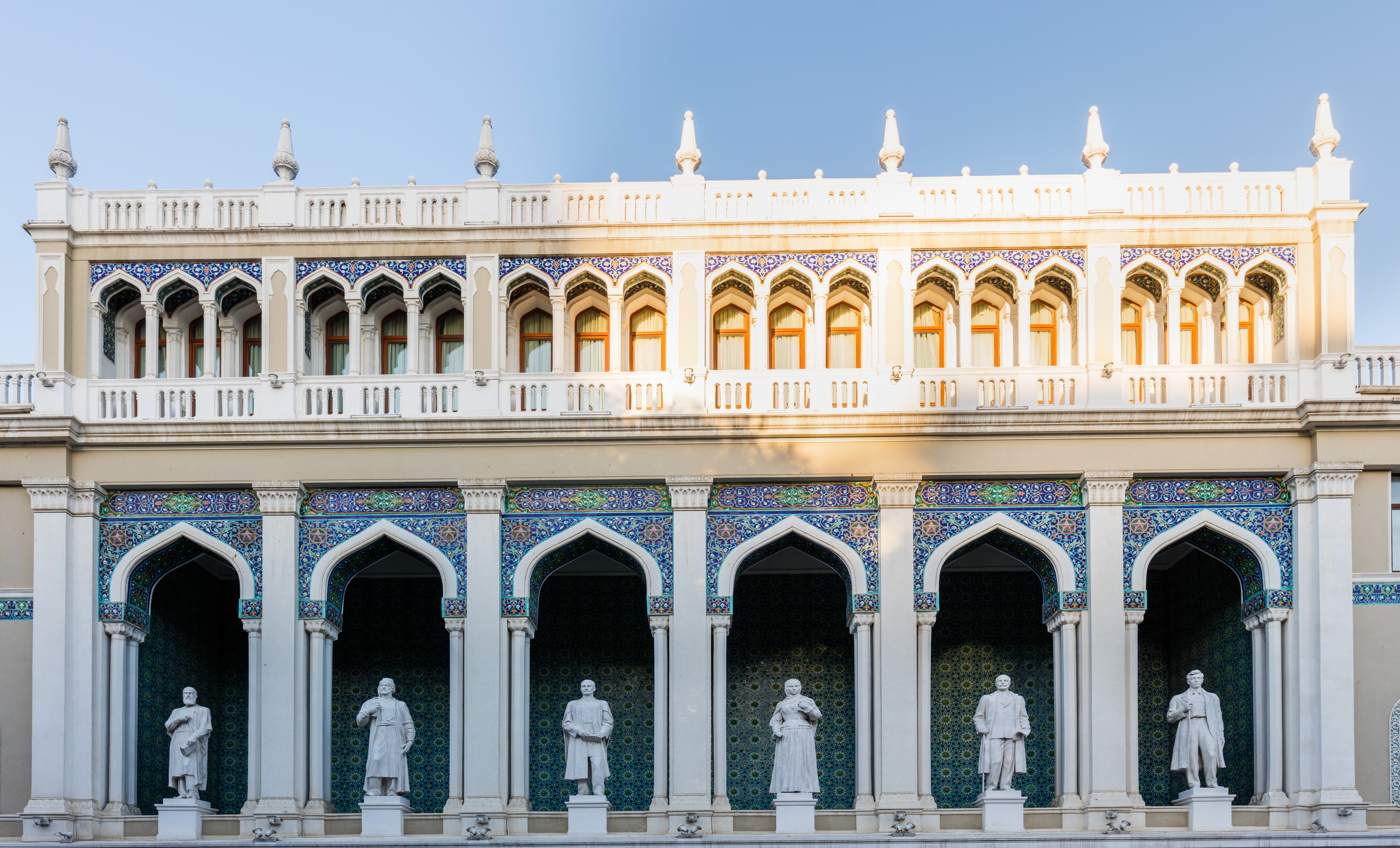
Sculptures in the upper floor.

The building where the museum is located was built in 1850 as a one-storeyed caravanserais. In 1915, the building was given to the “Metropol” hotel, and the second storey was rebuilt. Then, in 1918-1920s, workers of the Cabinet of Ministers of the Azerbaijan Democratic Republic lived and worked in the building; in 1920-30s the labor union soviet of Azerbaijan was located in the building.

On November 1, 1939, according to Order No. 4972 of the Council of People's Commissars of the Azerbaijan SSR, a memorial museum named after Nizami was created in the building in connection with the 800th anniversary of the Persian poet Nizami Ganjavi. The building was overhauled by the project of architects Sadikh Dadashov and Mikayil Huseynov, who placed sculptures in the façade and reconstructed two floors. Later, the memorial museum was changed to the Museum of Azerbaijani Literature. The interior of the museum was designed by Letif Kerimov. During World War II, when the 800th anniversary of the Persian poet Nizami Ganjavi was celebrated in Leningrad Blockade, the placement work of the museum's exposition was continued. On May 14, 1945, the museum opened its doors to visitors only after the victory in the Great Patriotic War, despite that, the museum was established in 1939.

Twice, in 1959 and 1967, the museum was overhauled, expanded and upgraded. In 2001–2003, the museum was changed again.

Further renovations took place in summer 2005, after a visit of Ilham Aliyev, the president of Azerbaijan, the previous year. The Cabinet of Ministers of Azerbaijan Republic assigned 13 million manats for the refurbishment. The museum's exposition area was expanded by 2500 square meters, and the number of halls increased to 30 main and 10 auxiliary areas. Prior to the work, the museum could display about 1000 exhibits from its collection of 120,000 items; after the reconstruction, the museum could show 25,000 exhibits at once.

== The building ==
The total area of the museum is 2500 square meters, with 1409 square meters given to exposition. There are more than 3000 manuscripts, rare books, illustrations, portraits, sculptures, miniatures, memories of poets and other exhibits in 30 general and 10 auxiliary halls of the museum. Part of the museum is a bookshop.

The sculptures of the eminent Azerbaijani poets and writers were placed on the façade of the museum on the following way: Muhammad Fuzuli (sculptor: F. Abdurrahmanov), Molla Panah Vagif (sculptor: S. Klyatskiy), Mirza Fatali Akhundov (sculptor: P.Sabsai), Khurshidbanu Natavan (sculptor: Y. Tripolskaya), Jalil Mammadguluzadeh (sculptor: N.Zakharov), and Jafar Jabbarly (sculptor: S. Klyatskiy). There are 120,000 museum exhibits stored in the fond of the museum.

== Exhibits ==
The museum's most well-known exhibits include a manuscript of Nizami's Eskandar Nameh in Persian language, which was written in 1413; a manuscript of Fuzuli's “Bangu Bada” (1569); and “The Eastern poem about Pushkin’s decease” of Mirza Fatali Akhundov.

== See also ==
- Literature of Azerbaijan
