= Sadiq Dadashov =

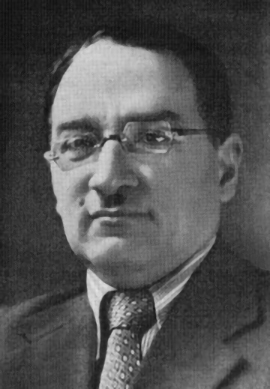
- Born: 15 April 1905; Baku, Baku Governorate, Russian Empire
- Died: 24 December 1946 (aged 41); Moscow, Soviet Union
- Awards: Stalin Prize (1941)

Sadiq Alakbar oghlu Dadashov (Azerbaijani: Sadıq Ələkbər oğlu Dadaşov, 1905 – 1946) was an architect and architecture historian of the Soviet Azerbaijan, Honored Art Worker of the Azerbaijan SSR (1940), laureate of the Stalin Prize of the 2nd Degree (1941).

== Biography ==
S.A. Dadashov was born on April 15, 1905, in Baku. In 1929, he graduated from Azerbaijan State Oil Academy (afterward he became its professor). He was the author of books about the architecture of Azerbaijan. He was a full member of the Academy of Sciences of the Azerbaijan SSR (1945). Sadiq Dadashov worked in close cooperation with Mikayil Useynov. He developed progressive traditions of Azerbaijani architecture creatively. He erected many residential and public buildings in Baku and in other cities of Azerbaijan.

Dadashov died in Moscow, on December 24, 1946.

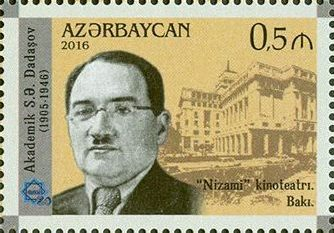
Azerbaijan postage stamp portraying Sadiq Dadashov and the "Nizami" cinema in Baku

== Architectural projects ==
•Exhibit hall of Azerbaijan SSR in All-Russia Exhibition Centre, in Moscow (1939).

•Cinema named after Nizami (1934).

•Nizami Museum of Azerbaijani Literature.

•Building of the Central Committee of the Communist Party of the Azerbaijan SSR (1938–1939).

•Building of Baku Academy of Music.

•Building of the Ministry of Food Industry of Azerbaijan (1937–1939).

== Awards and premiums ==
- Stalin Prize of the 2nd Degree (1941) – for architectural project of the exhibit hall of Azerbaijan SSR in All-Russia Exhibition Centre (1939)
- Honored Art Worker of the Azerbaijan SSR (1940)
- Order of Lenin
- Order of the Red Banner of Labour

== Legacy ==
The Research Institute of construction materials in Baku is named after Dadashov.
