= Leyli and Majnun (Fuzuli) =

1536 poem by Fuzuli

- by Fuzuli
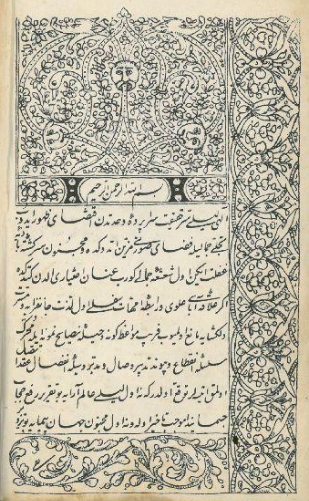
- Manuscript from Tabriz, 1856
- Original title: لیلی و مجنون
- Written: 1536
- Language: Azerbaijani
- Subject: Layla and Majnun
- Genre: Mathnawi
- Form: Epic poem

Full text
- az:Leyli və Məcnun (Füzuli) at Wikisource

Leyli and Majnun (Azerbaijani: لیلی و مجنون, romanized: Leyli və Məcnun) is an epic poem written in Azerbaijani by the 16th-century poet Fuzuli. The poem, written in the form of a mathnawi (rhyming couplets), tells the story of a young man named Qays who falls in love with a girl named Leyli and earns the nickname "Majnun" (lit. 'Madman') because of his love for her. The poem, considered the pinnacle of Fuzuli's creation, consists of 3096 bayts and was dedicated to Üveys Pasha, the Ottoman ruler of Baghdad. In 1908, Uzeyir Hajibeyov composed the first opera in the Islamic world based on this work of Fuzuli.

== Analysis of the poem ==
Fuzuli created this poem, closely related to the Azerbaijani oral-poetic creation, continuing and updating the traditions of his predecessors. The poem is based on an ancient Arab legend. Fuzuli inserted lyric poems into the poem (22 ghazals, 2 murabbas, and 2 munajats), which harmoniously fit into the narrative, and, at the same time, remain independent.

The heroes of the poem, the poet Majnun (Qays), seeks the meaning and happiness of his life in romantic love. However, the feudal and religious traditions and customs are hostile to his ideals. In the eyes of Qays's surrounding environment, he is "Majnun" (that is, possessed). His love for the beautiful Leyli finds a harsh condemnation of the social circle to which he belongs. This is one of the tragic conflicts sources. Despite the fact that at the end of the poem the mystical motives are intensified, Fuzuli showed the true human love.

The Institute of Oriental Studies of the Russian Academy of Sciences keeps 12 lists of manuscripts of the "Leyli and Majnun" poem.

== Plot ==
Fuzuli begins the story with a prayer to God (Ilahi). He calls Leyli the truth (həqiqət) embodiment, which adorns with the radiance of her beauty, and Majnun is called wandering in the desert of ignorance. In the ruba'i, Fuzuli calls God the source of love (eşq), the strength of which is likened to chains (zəncir). The world (Dünya) is called the curtain (niqab) of God, which keeps 7 roses and 10 flower-gardens (gülüstan). Fuzuli mentions that even time itself (zəman) and our mind (əql) were created by Allah. He calls to follow the Prophet's Sharia and not get carried away neither with the wealth, wine nor the hashish. Further, Fuzuli praises the Prophet, who saw Jibril (Cibril) in reality and ascended to heaven on Buraq (Büraq). Noting the hardships of life, he nevertheless recognizes that the wine and the intercession of the rulers can facilitate the existence of the poet. As an example, Fuzuli refers to Abu Nuwas, Ali-Shir Nava'i and Nizami Ganjavi. He addresses many lines to the cupbearer (saqi), whom to pour him wine.

After a long introduction, Fuzuli decides to tell the love story of Leyli and Majnun. He begins his narration with the birth of a boy named Qays in the family of an Arab sheikh from Najd. At school, the boy fell in love (məhəbbət) with the beautiful (gözəl) Leyli, who fascinated him with her eyes, eyebrows and hair, as well as with her red lips as the rose. Fuzuli's Qays also finds her attractive (şirin) and compares her to a cypress, her eyes and eyebrows to a daffodil flower, and her breath to the roses scent. Over time this feeling grew into a strong love (eşq), which overshadowed the mind and Qays became a prisoner (əsir) of his feelings. However, the girl's mother fears the dishonour and shame that this love can lead to. Therefore, Leyli is forced to leave the school and mourn her separation (cüdalıq) in loneliness. Qays dwells in grief (dərd), cursing his fate (fələk), a reason for those around him to begin calling him Majnun (possessed). After a short chance meeting with his beloved, Majnun says goodbye to his friends and retires into the desert. In his farewell verse, he contrasts the mind (əql) and love (eşq): "When I see the expanse of love, I go astray from my rational path."

Majnun's saddened father finds his son in the desert and convinces him to return home. He tries to call him for freedom (azad) from the slave passion reading a verse against love, calling it a soul's affliction (afəti-can). Seeing Majnun's resistance, his father decides to matchmaking to Leyli's father who refuses to marry his daughter to a madman. Majnun's father unsuccessfully seeks a cure for his son's madness. Finally, he is advised to perform the Hajj and receive healing at the black stone (qara daş). However, even this does not bring healing. Majnun finds some consolation in the mountains. Then, imbued with sympathy, he frees a gazelle (qəzal) and a dove (kəbutər) from nets. Meanwhile, an enviable groom, Ibn Salam, is wooing Leyli. Novfal (Növfəl) finds Majnun in the desert and recruits him into his detachment, promising to reunite him with Leyli. The detachment of the Rumian Turk Novfal attacks Leyli's tribe, but Majnun suffers from the death of his beloved's relatives and does not want victory at any cost. Novfal wins, but Leyli's father insists on her sacred bond of marriage with Ibn Salam. Majnun becomes an ascetic in the desert and begins to understand the frailty of the world around him. However, through his prayers, Ibn Salam passed away and Leyli became widower. Leyli, riding a camel, goes in search of Majnun, but he does not seek to renew the relationship with her, since he has reached the "perfect state" (vücudi-kamil). In desperation, Leyli gets ill and dies. Upon learning of her death, Majnun comes to her grave and also dies. Fuzuli says that their friend Zeyd sees in a dream their couple in love in paradise.

== The world of Leyli and Majnun ==
Fuzuli, in his poem, gives a detailed description of the surrounding nature. The landscape is dominated by desert (səhra).

- Among the fauna, are mentioned: a moth (pərvanə), a nightingale (bülbül), a dove (kəbutər), a gazelle (qəzal), a deer (gəvəzn), a wolf (gürg), a fox (rubah), a lion (arslan, şir), a tiger (pələng) and leopard (qaplan).
- From plants: rose (gül), poppy / tulip (lalə), daffodil (nərgis), boxwood (şümşad) and cypress (sərv)
- From countries: Anatolia (Rum), Syria (Şam), Najd (Nəcd), Hijaz (Hicaz), Greater Khorasan (Xorasan).
- From the planets: Zuhra, Jupiter (Müştəri, Bərcis), Utarid (Ütarid), Bahram (Bəhram) and Saturn (Keyvan).
- Constellations: Aries (Həməl), Scorpio (Əqrəb) and Pleiades (Sürəyya).
- From nations: Turks (türk) and Arabs (ərəb)

== Gallery ==
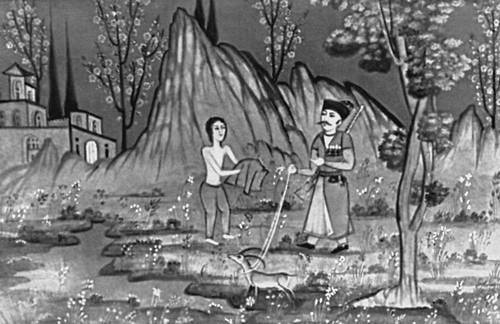
"Majnun with a Deer", miniature to the poem (18th century)

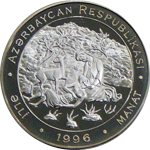
Commemorative coin of Azerbaijan with the image of Majnun, issued in the honor of the 500th anniversary of Fuzuli

== Sources ==
- Gutsche, George J.; Weber, Harry Butler; Rollberg, Peter (1987). The Modern Encyclopedia of Russian and Soviet Literatures: Including Non-Russian and Emigre Literatures. Forest spirit-Gorenshtein, Fridrikh Naumovich. Academic International Press. ISBN 978-0-87569-038-4.
- Macit, Muhsin (2013). "FUZÛLÎ". Türk Edebiyatı İsimler Sözlüğü (in Turkish). Ahmet Yesevi University.
- Məhəmməd Füzuli Əsərləri (PDF). Vol. 2. Baku: Şərq-Qərb. 2005. Archived from the original (PDF) on 2010-09-23.
- Yarshater, Ehsan, ed. (2000). "FOŻŪLĪ, MOḤAMMAD". Encyclopædia Iranica. Vol. X/2: Forūḡī–Fruit. London and New York: Routledge & Kegan Paul. pp. 121–122. ISBN 978-0-933273-41-2.
