= Qit'a =

Form of Arabic poetry

The qit'a (from Arabic: قطعة, romanized: qiṭʿa, lit. 'fragment' or 'piece') is a form of monorhyme poetry that usually appears in Arabic, Persian, Turkish, Urdu and other associated literature.

== Sources ==
- Losensky, P. (2017). Greene, Roland (ed.). "Qiṭʿa". The Princeton Encyclopedia of Poetry and Poetics. Princeton University Press. doi:10.1093/acref/9780190681173.001.0001. ISBN 9780691154916.
