= Mikayil Huseynov =

Mikayıl Hüseynov
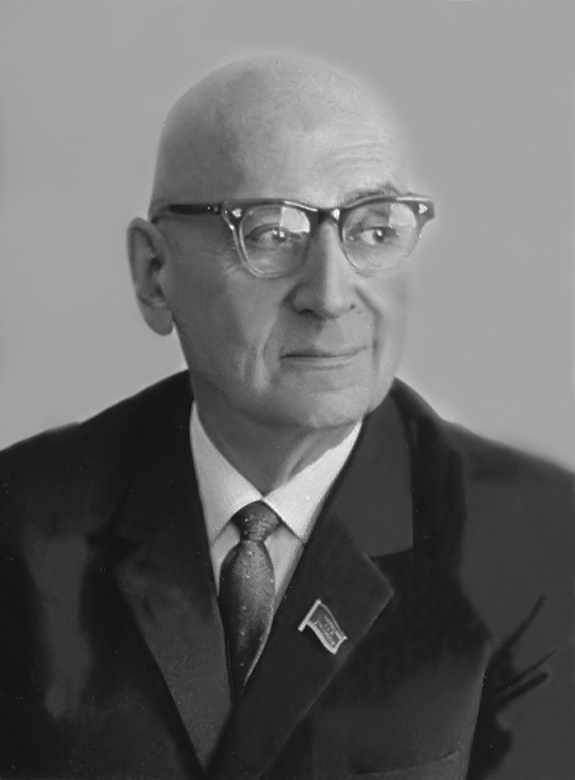
- Born: 19 April 1905; Baku, Russian Empire
- Died: 7 October 1992 (aged 87); Baku, Azerbaijan
- Known for: Architect
- Notable work: Building of the Central Committee of the Communist Party of Azerbaijan, Azerbaijan State Conservatory, Nizami Museum of Azerbaijan Literature in Baku, pavilion of Azerbaijan at All-Russia Exhibition Centre in Moscow (1939 and 1954), group of buildings of the Azerbaijan National Academy of Sciences (1951–1966)

Mikayil Alasger oghlu Huseynov (Azerbaijani: Mikayıl Ələsgər oğlu Hüseynov; 1905–1992) was a Soviet Azerbaijani architect and historian of architecture. He was People's Architect of the USSR (1970), Professor (1939); Academician of the Academy of Sciences of the USSR (1945), full member of the Academy of Architecture of the USSR (1985), Hero of Socialist Labour (1985), laureate of the Second Class State Stalin Prize (1941), member of England's and Ireland's Royal Society of Asians.

== Early years ==
Huseynov was born on 19 April 1905, in Baku, in a well-off family. His father was a millionaire, had streamships on the Caspian Sea and a great mansion on the seafront. His descent hung over him as the sword of Damocles and he could be arrested at any time.

== Career ==
Until 1946, he worked in close creative and scientific cooperation with S.A. Dadashov. While students, Huseynov and Dadashov were awarded the first prize for joint design of the monument to Nizami Ganjavi - the eminent poet and thinker of the 12th century.

Building of the Central Committee of the Communist Party of Azerbaijan, Azerbaijan State Conservatory, Nizami Museum of Azerbaijan Literature in Baku, pavilion of All-Russia Exhibition Centre of Azerbaijan in Moscow (1939 and 1954) are among their best architectural works. Individual works of Huseynov - design of State Public Library named after M.F.Akhundov (1960), group of buildings of the National Academy of Sciences of the Azerbaijan SSR (1951–1966) in Baku, publications concerning architecture and urban building problems and others.

He died on October 7, 1992, and was buried in the Alley of Honor in Baku.

== Awards and recognitions ==
- Second Class State Stalin Prize (1941) – for architectural design of Azerbaijan SSR pavilion at All-Russia Exhibition Centre;
- Hero of Socialist Labor (1985) – for outstanding contribution to the development of the Soviet architecture, for productive scientific, pedagogical and social activity and in connection with his 80th anniversary;
- Three Orders of Lenin (1946,1958, 1985);
- Two Orders of the Red Banner of Labor (1939, 1952);
- Deputy of the Supreme Soviet of the Soviet Union of the 4th convocation (1954–1962).

== See also ==
- Anvar Gasimzade
