= Barthold =

Barthold or Bartold is a masculine given name and a surname. Notable people with the name include:

== Given name ==
- Barthold, Archbishop of Trier (died 883)
- Barthold Heinrich Brockes (1680–1747), German poet
- Barthold Douma van Burmania (1695–1766), Dutch diplomat
- Barthold A. Butenschøn Sr. (1877–1971), Norwegian businessperson
- Barthold A. Butenschøn (1904–2001), Norwegian banker and book publisher
- Barthold Hansteen Cranner (1867–1925), Norwegian botanist
- Barthold Fles (1902–1989), American writer
- Barthold Halle (1925–2025), Norwegian theatre director
- Barthold Theodoor Willem van Hasselt (1896–1960), Dutch business executive
- Barthold Rudolf Hast (1724–1784), Finnish physician
- Barthold Kuijken (born 1949), Belgian flautist and recorder player
- Barthold Nicolai Landsberg (1668–1740), Norwegian Army general
- Barthold Georg Niebuhr (1776–1831), Danish-German statesman and historian
- Barthold Nihus (1590–1657), German Roman Catholic bishop
- Barthold Suermondt (1818–1887), German entrepreneur, banker, philanthropist and art collector

== Surname ==
- Charles Barthold, American photojournalist
- Clara Barthold Mayer (born late 18th century), Swiss artist
- John Barthold (1882-1946), American baseball player
- Lauren Swayne Barthold (born 1965), American philosopher
- Lionel Barthold (1920–2025), American electrical engineer
- Norman Bartold (1928–94), American actor
- Peter Barthold (born 1954), Austrian footballer
- Sebastian Barthold (born 1991), Norwegian handball player
- Vasily Bartold, also known as Wilhelm Barthold (1869–1930), Turcologist and historian of Central Asia
- William G. Barthold (1897–1969), American politician

== See also ==
- Bartholdi (surname)
- Bartholdt
