= Portal (architecture) =

Access opening in a wall of a structure

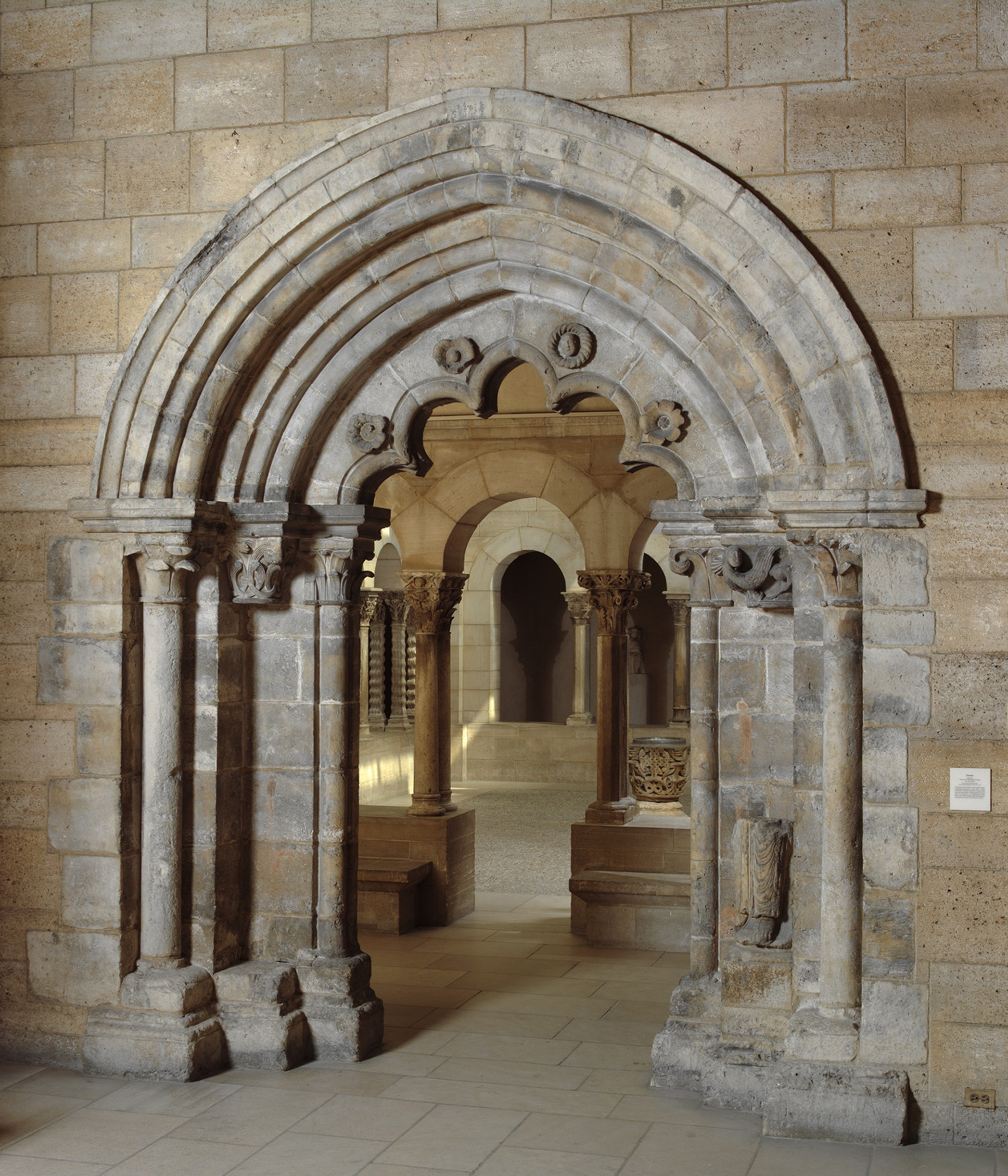
Gothic portal from the Reugny Chapel of Laféline, from the late 12th century, now in the MET's The Cloisters museum (New York City)

A portal is an opening in a wall of a building, gate or fortification, especially a grand entrance to an important structure.

Doors, metal gates, or portcullis in the opening can be used to control entry or exit. The surface surrounding the opening may be made of simple building materials or decorated with ornamentation. The elements of a portal can include the voussoir, tympanum, an ornamented mullion or trumeau between doors, and columns with carvings of saints in the westwork of a church.

== Examples ==
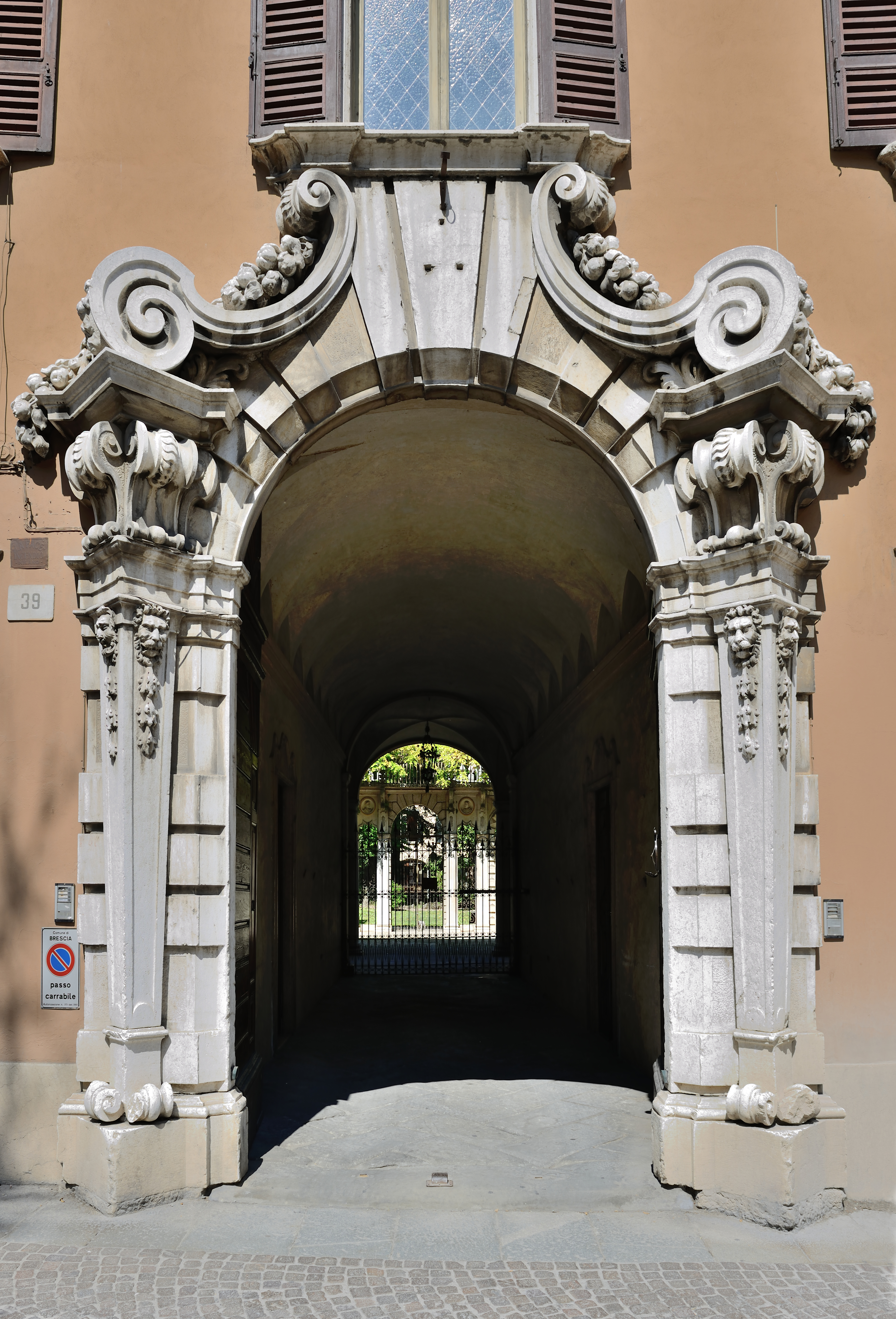
Baroque portal of a private palace in Brescia

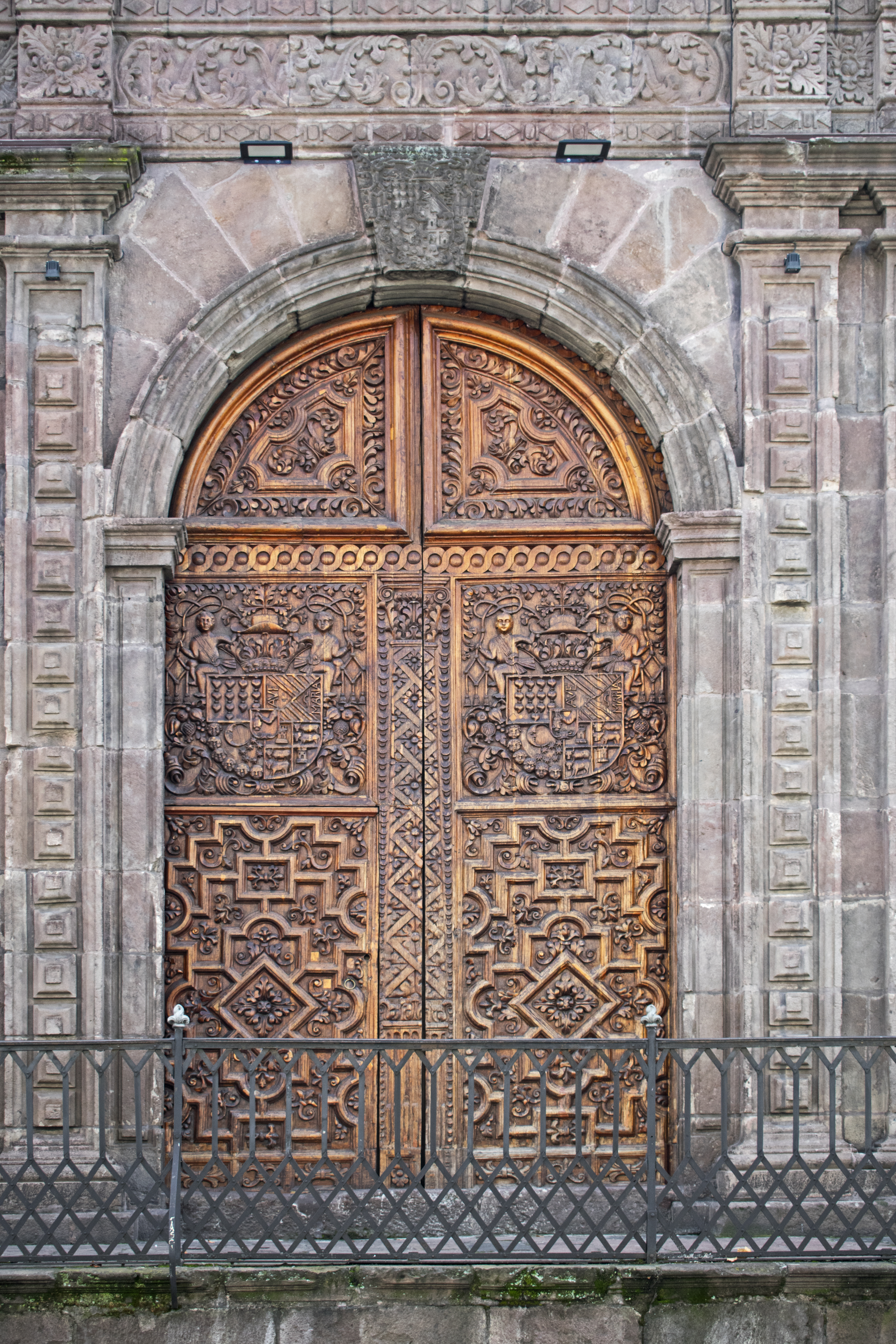
Baroque portal of the Church of El Carmen Bajo Monastery in Quito

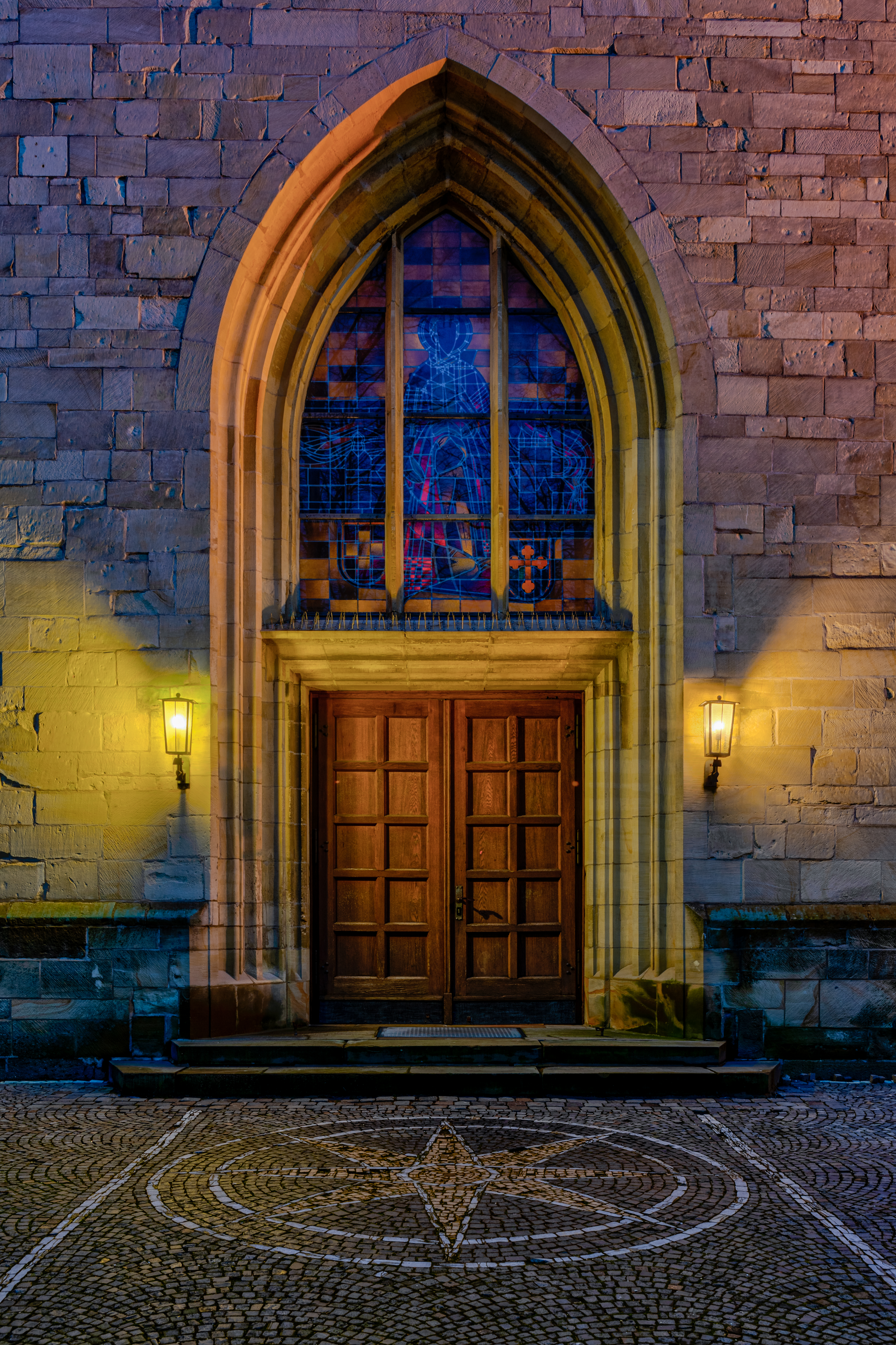
Wooden portal of the Church of St. Victor in Dülmen

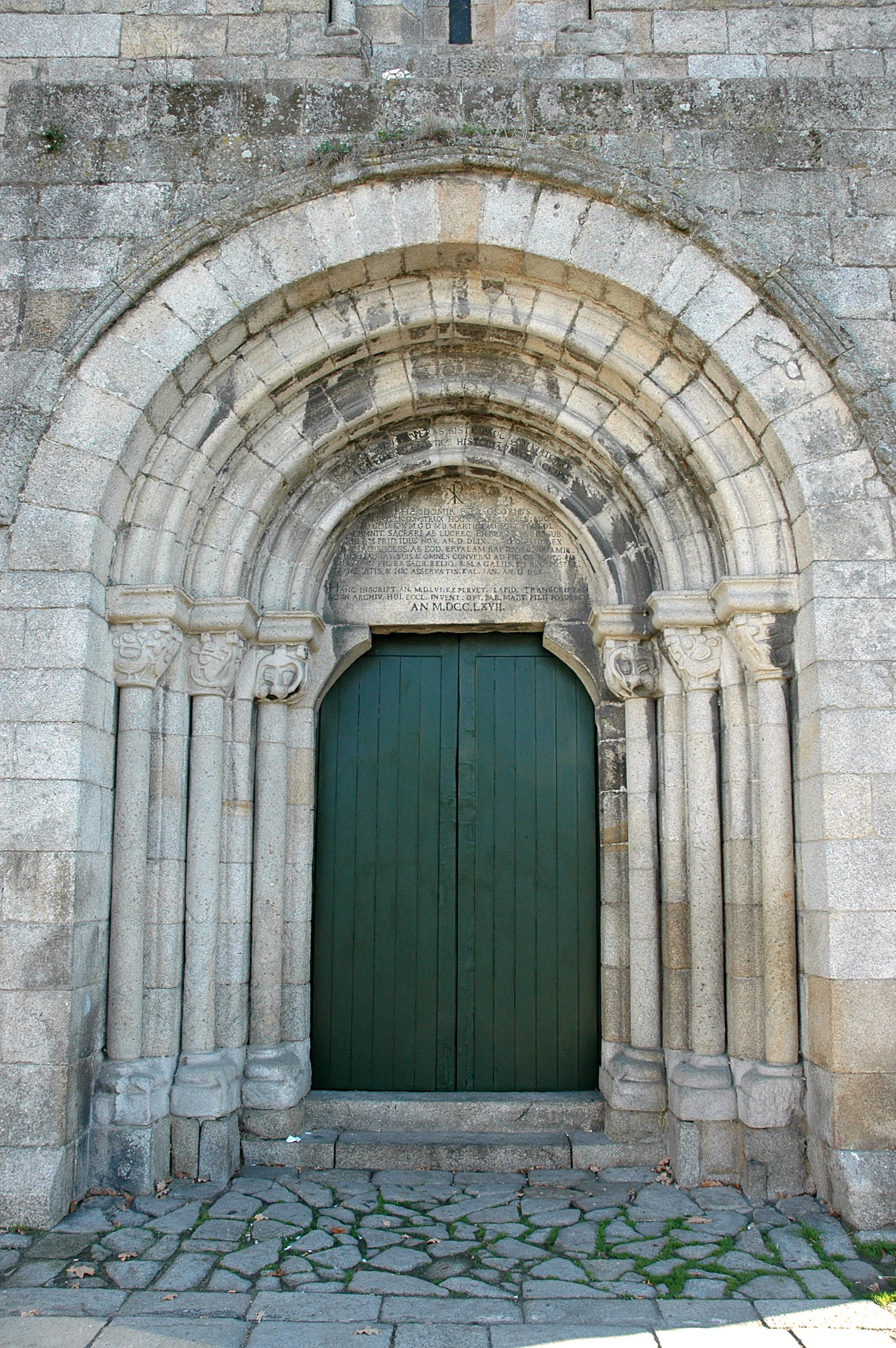
Romanesque portal of the Church of São Martinho de Cedofeita, with nested arches

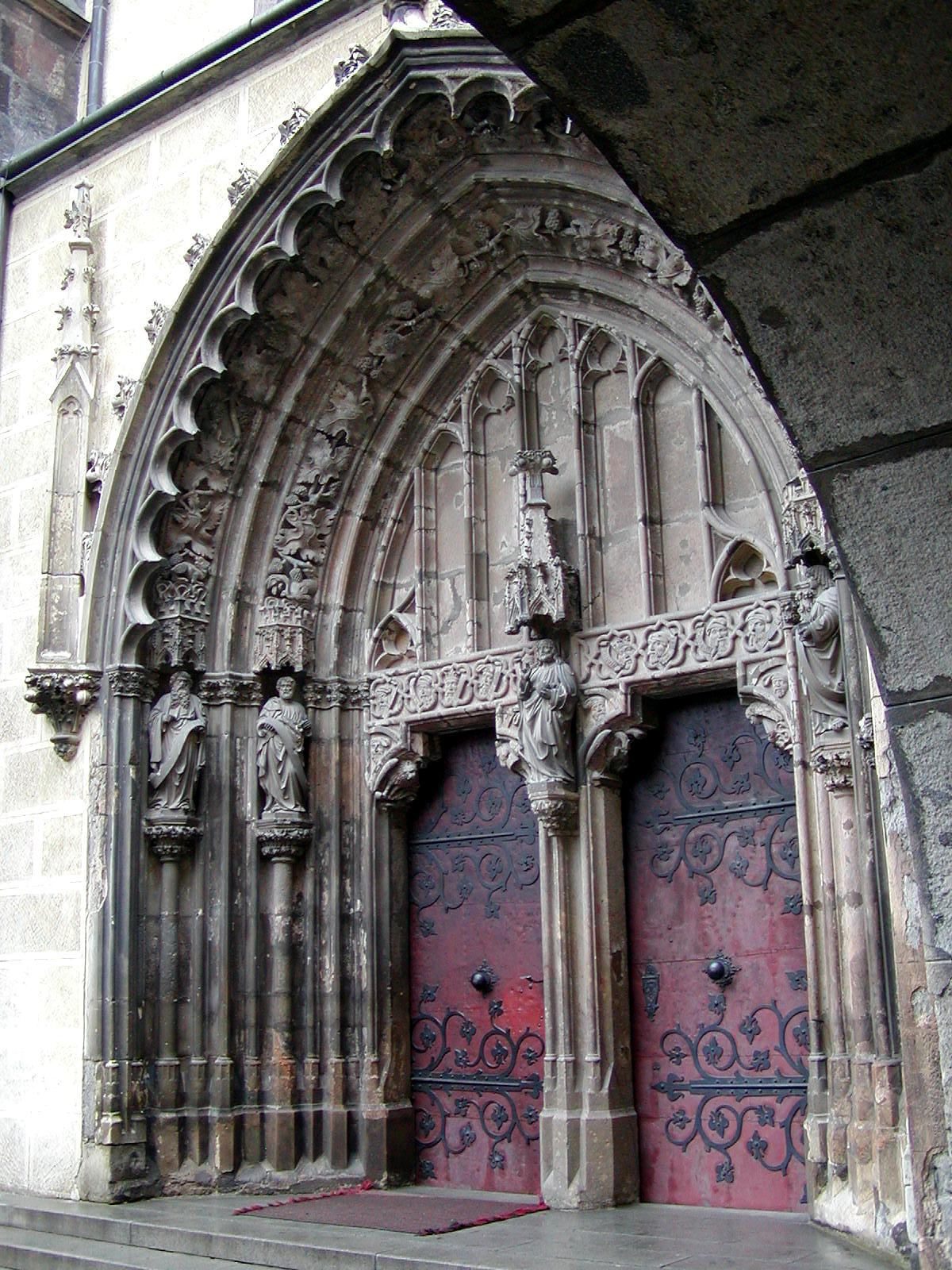
Gothic portal of the church in Hronský Beňadik

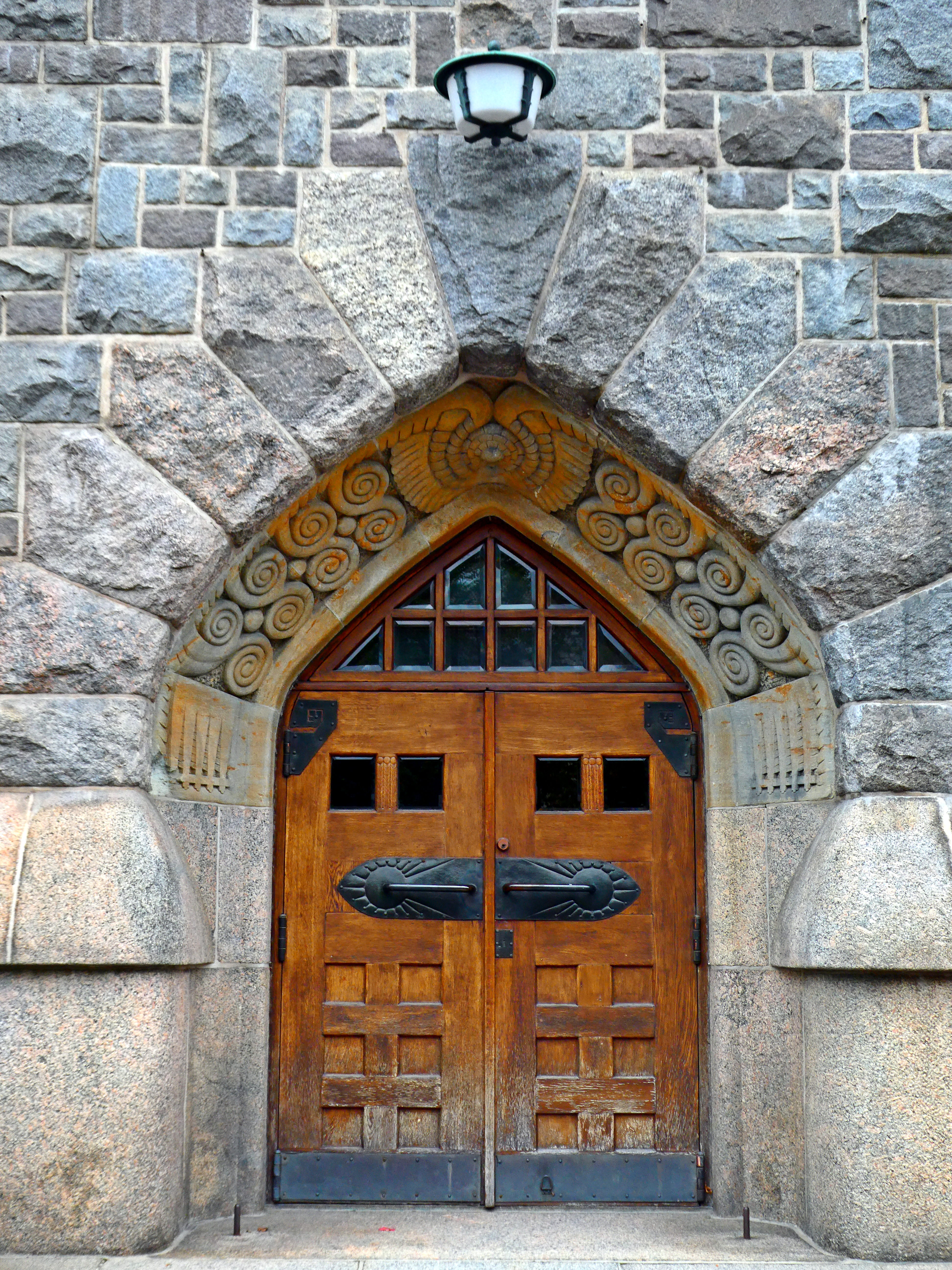
Romantic portal of the St. John's Cathedral in Tampere

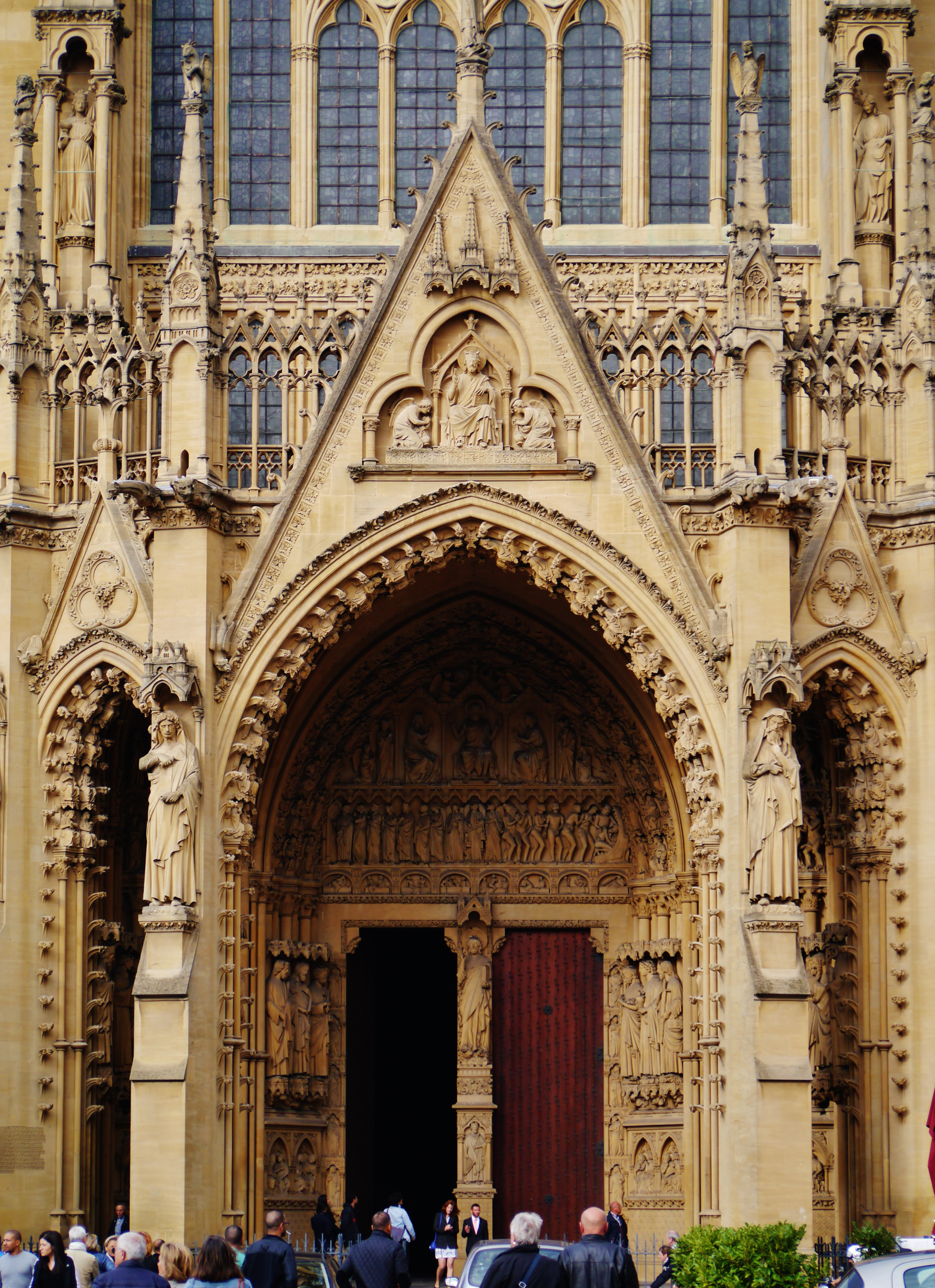
Gothic portal of the Cathedral of Saint Stephen in Metz

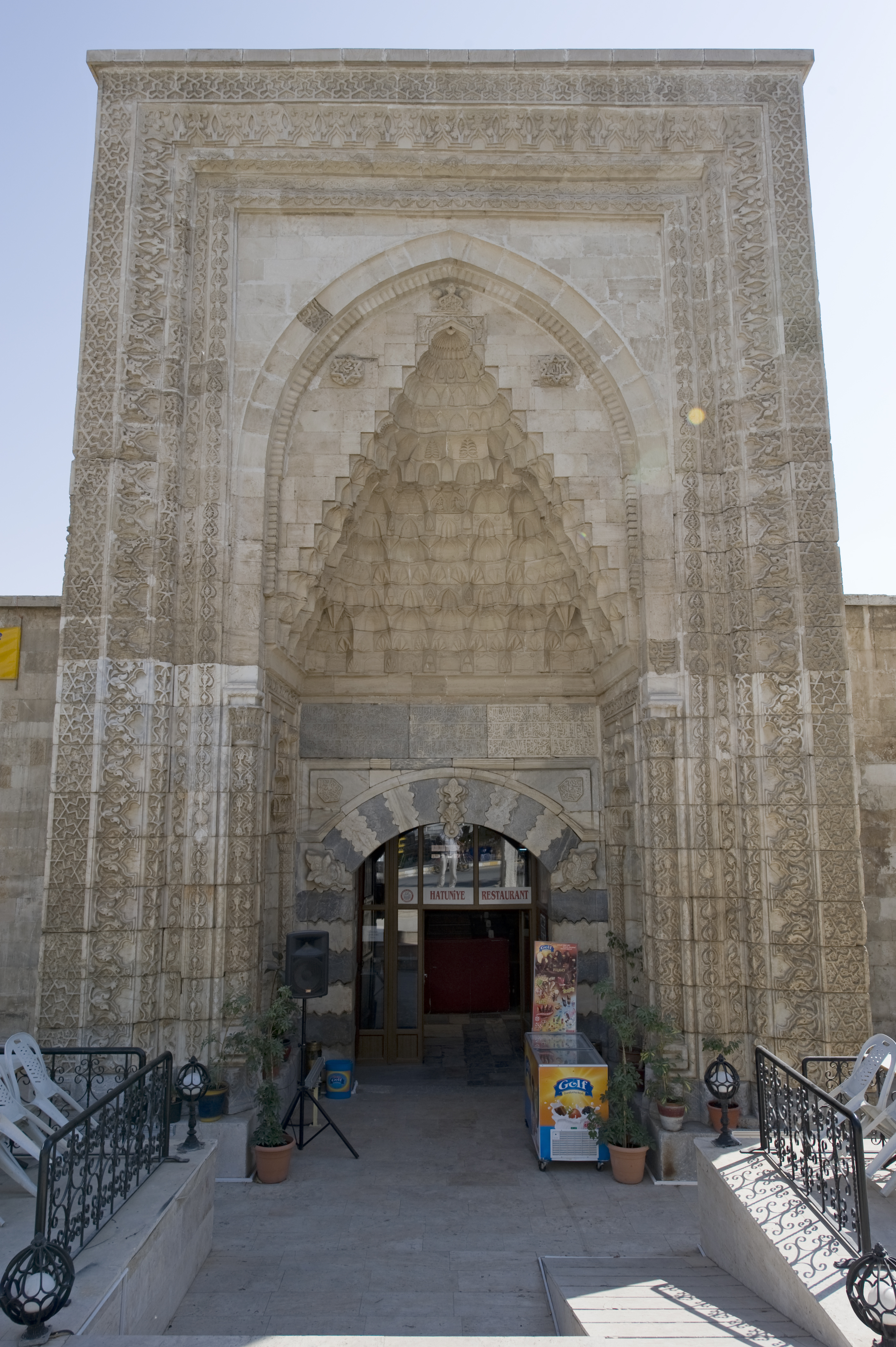
Taşkapı (stone gatehouse) of the Hatuniye Medresesi in Karaman

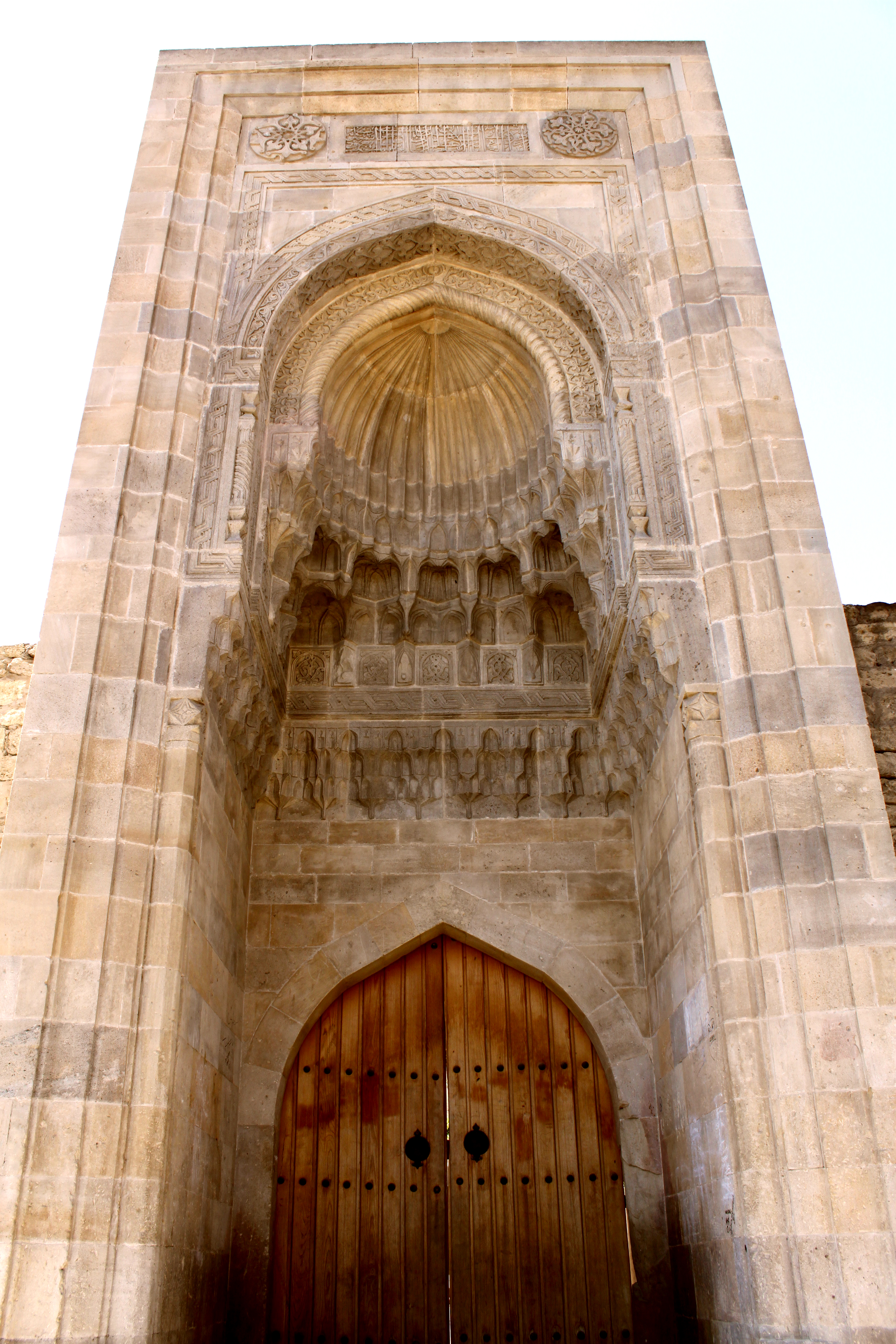
Murad's Gate in the Palace of the Shirvanshahs, Baku

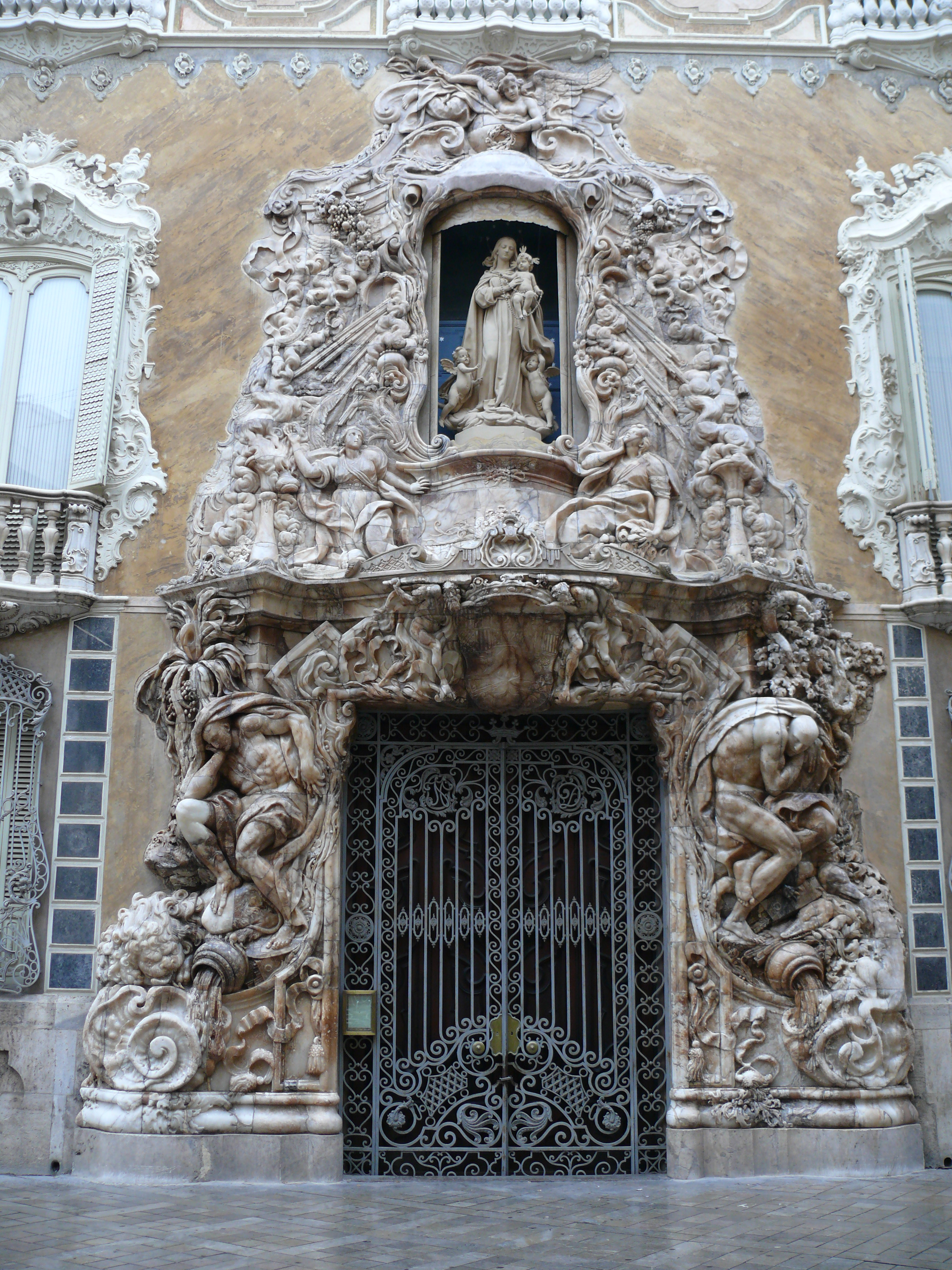
Rococo portal of the Palace of the Marqués de Dos Aguas in Valencia

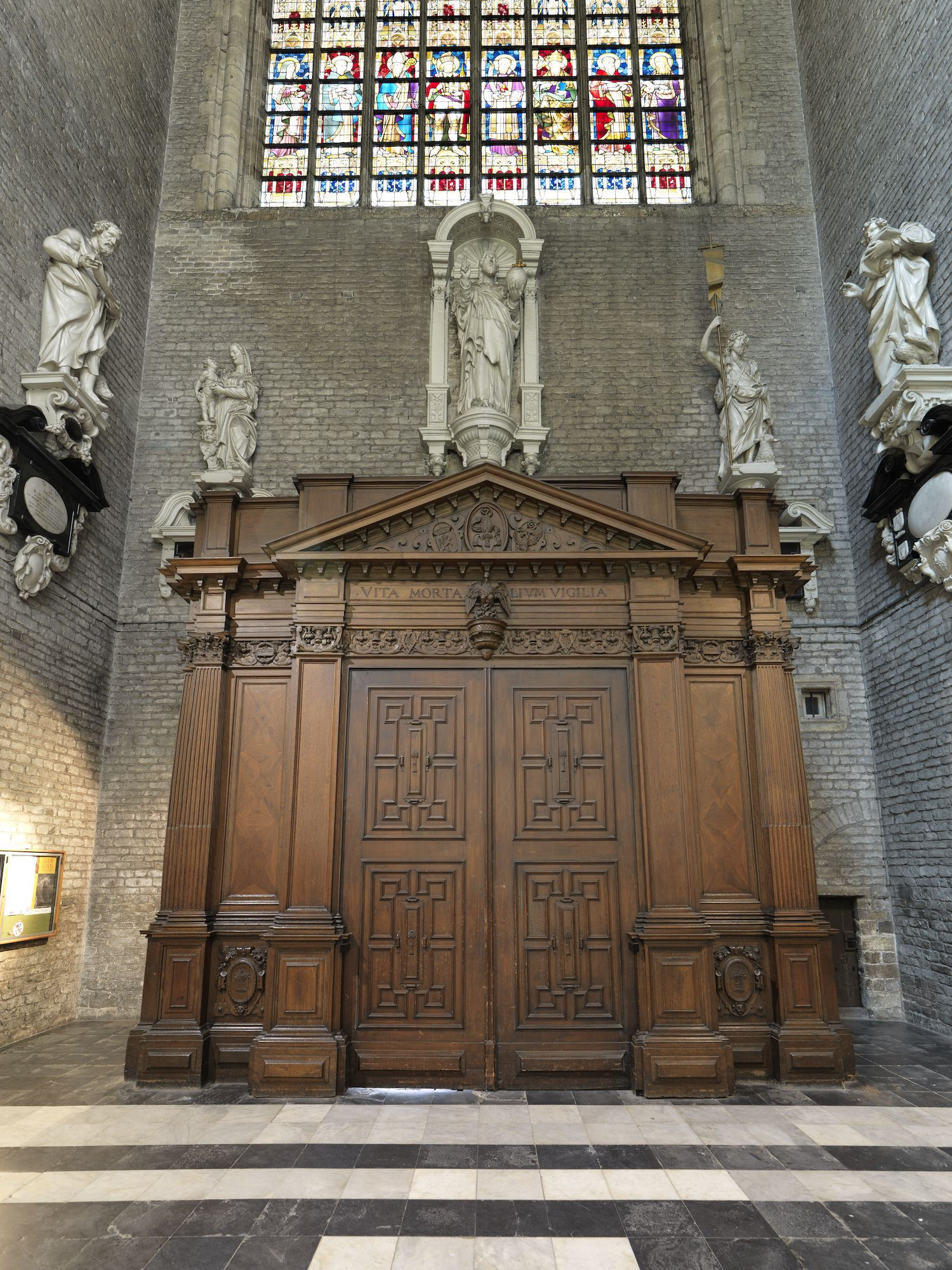
Portal of the Saint Bavo's Cathedral, Ghent

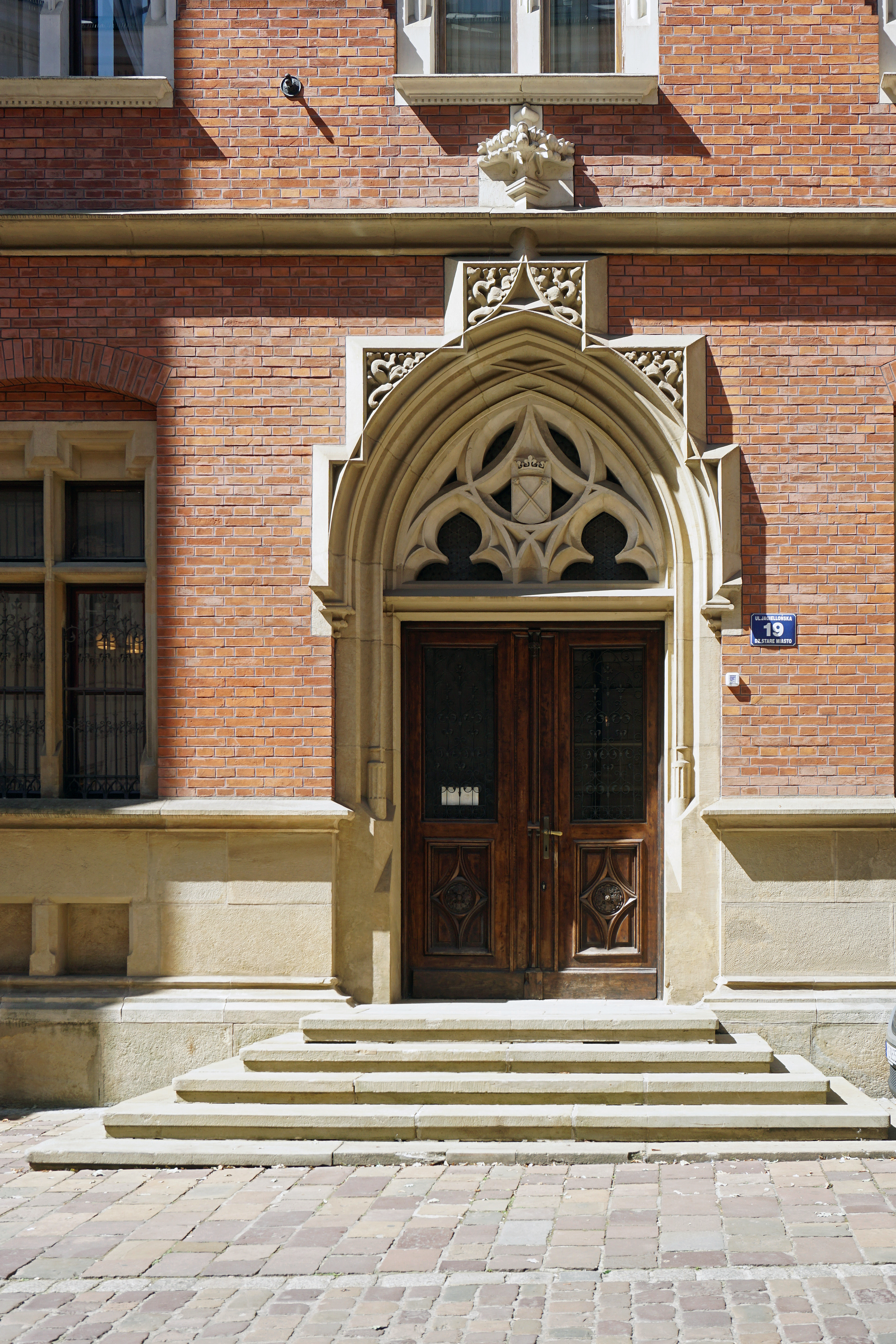
Portal of the Collegium Novum of the Jagiellonian University, Kraków

== Other uses ==
The term portal is also applied to the ends of a tunnel.

== See also ==
- Portico
- City gate
