= Vadim Leviatov =

Soviet historian

Vadim Nikolayevich Leviatov (Russian: Вадим Николаевич Левиатов) was a Soviet historian, specializing in the history of Azerbaijan. In 1946, Leviatov discovered ancient and early medieval artifacts in the upper courtyard of the Shirvanshahs' Palace in Azerbaijan. He also prepared a general classification of glazed vessels from the 7th–15th centuries AD found in Azerbaijan.

== Selected publications ==
- Памятники азербайджанской культуры (Artifacts of Azerbaijani Culture), Изд-во АзФАН, 1944
- "О типах глазурованной керамики Азербайджана в VII–XV вв" ("On Types of Glazed Pottery of Azerbaijan in 7th–15th Centuries"), Изв. АН Азерб. ССР., 1946
- Очерки из истории Азербайджана в XVIII веке (Essays on the History of Azerbaijan in the 18th Century), Изд-во АН Азерб. ССР, 1948
- "Азербайджан с V в. до н.э. по III в.н.э." ("Azerbaijan from the 5th Century BC to the 3rd Century AD"), Известия Академии наук Азербайджанской ССР., 1950, №1
