= Palace of the Shirvanshahs =

The Shirvanshah's Palace
UNESCO World Heritage Site
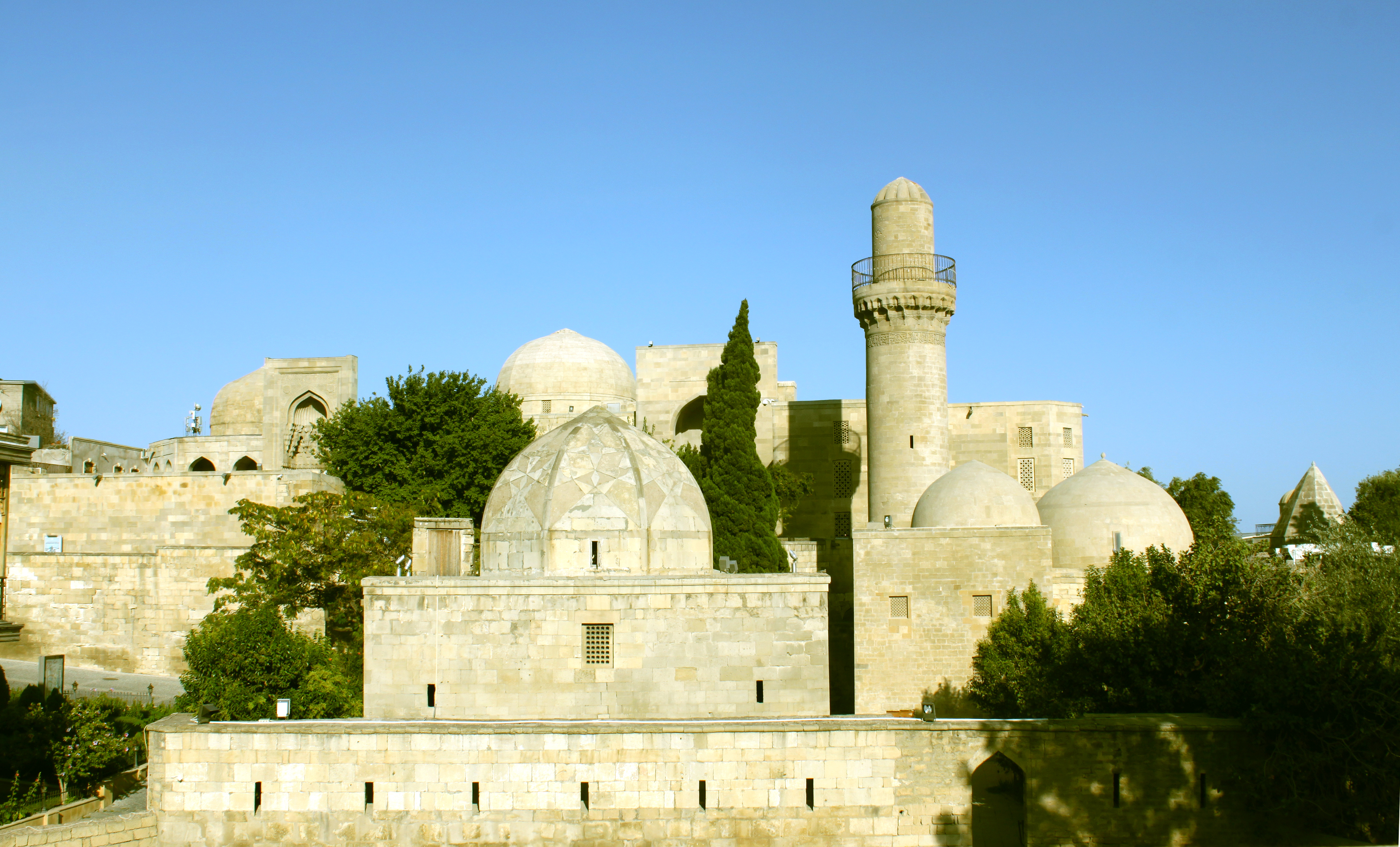
- View of the Palace of the Shirvanshahs

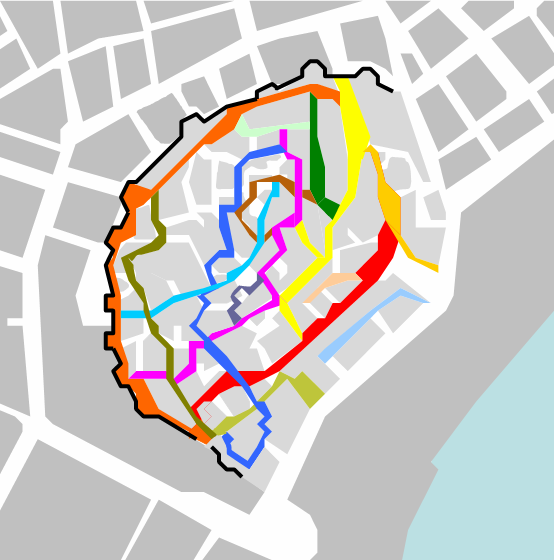
- Location within Streets in Old City, Baku, Azerbaijan
- Location: Baku, Azerbaijan
- Part of: Walled City of Baku with the Shirvanshah's Palace and Maiden Tower
- Criteria: Cultural: (iv)
- Reference: 958
- Inscription: 2000 (24th Session)
- Coordinates: 40°21′58″N 49°50′00″E

The Palace of the Shirvanshahs (Azerbaijani: Şirvanşahlar Sarayı, Persian: کاخ شروان‌شاهان) is a 15th-century palace built by the Shirvanshahs and described by UNESCO as "one of the pearls of Azerbaijan's architecture". It is located in the Inner City of Baku, Azerbaijan and, together with the Maiden Tower, forms an ensemble of historic monuments inscribed under the UNESCO World Heritage List of Historical Monuments. The complex contains the main building of the palace, Divanhane, the burial-vaults, the shah's mosque with a minaret, Seyid Yahya Bakuvi's mausoleum (the so-called "mausoleum of the dervish"), south of the palace, a portal in the east, Murad's gate, a reservoir and the remnants of a bath house. Earlier, there was an ancient mosque, next to the mausoleum. There is still ruins of the bath to the west of the tomb.

In the past, the palace was surrounded by a wall with towers and, thus, served as the inner stronghold of the Baku fortress. Despite the fact that at the present time no traces of this wall have survived on the surface, as late as the 1920s, the remains of apparently the foundations of the tower and the part of the wall connected with it could be distinguished on the north-eastern side of the palace.

There are no inscriptions that survive on the palace itself. Therefore, the time of its construction is determined by the dates in the inscriptions on the architectural monuments, which refer to the complex of the palace. Such two inscriptions were completely preserved only on the tomb and minaret of the Shah's mosque. There is the name of the ruler who ordered the establishment of these buildings in both inscriptions is the – Shirvan Khalil As time of construction – was marked on the tomb, 845 on the minaret of the Shah's mosque.

The burial vault, the palace and the mosque are built of the same material, the grating and masonry of the stone are the same.

The complex originally occupied a larger area and included rooms designated for court servants and various service functions.

The main buildings of the ensemble were built at different times. Despite this fact, these buildings are linked by unity of scale, by rhythm and proportionality of the basic architectural forms – cubic volumes of buildings, domes, portraits. The builders of the ensemble relied on the traditions of the Shirvan-Absheron architectural school.

In 1964, the palace complex was declared a museum-preserve and taken under the protection of the state. In 2000, this ensemble, along with the fortified walls of the historic part of the city and the Maiden Tower, was named a World Heritage Site.

The palace is depicted on the obverse of the Azerbaijani 10,000 manat banknote of 1994–2006 and of the 10 new manat banknote issued since 2006.

== History ==
In the 15th century the Shirvanshah dynasty, under Ibrahim I of Shirvan, transferred his capital from Shemakha to Baku following a devastating earthquake. He committed himself to the construction of the "palace". The building is believed to be a memorial complex built around the sacred place of worship (pir) and tomb of Seyyid Yaxya Bakuvi, who was a Helwati Sufi saint. The Shirvanshahs were patrons of the Helwati Sufiye order, and Shirvanshah Khalilullah I was buried with his family in the grounds of the palace. Other historians argue that the building was used as the ruler's palace. Both theories suffer from the absence of evidence. It is known that wells inside the grounds of the "palace" were considered to have healing qualities until recent times, as was the hill where the palace was built.

After the Safavid conquest of Baku in 1501, the Sufi order was expelled. Over centuries, the "palace" fell into ruin and was known in Baku as Baku Khans palace; this toponym moved into Russian historiography, first cited by Bartold.

Until 1501, there was not any information found about the building of the palace. According to one of the Persian chronicles, in 1501 the troops of Shirvanshakh Farrukh-yessar, the son Khalil-ully I, were defeated in Shemakha by the troops of Shah Ismail I from the Safavid dynasty. Farrukh-yessar was killed in the Battle of Shirvanshah; the troops of Ismail I, having defeated near Shemakha, moved to Baku, besieged it and after several assaults took the city. Then, a tall building of Shirvanshahs was destroyed due to the order of Shah Ismail I. After a while, the city of Baku and its entire district, as well as Shirvan, were governed by the governors who were placed by the Safavids. There is not any detailed information about the people who lived in the palace and in what state it was in the first half of the 16th century.

In the second half of the 16th century, there was a war between the Safavids and the Ottoman Empire. In 1578, the Turks conquered Baku. From the time of the rule of the Ottoman Empire in the palace area, the gate in the palace wall surrounding the palace from the east has been preserved. From the inscription placed on the portal of this gate, it follows that they were built during the reign of the Turkish sultan Murad III (1574–1595 years of rule).

Due to the literary works, there were Turkish pashas living in the palace at that time. The East Gate is a witness of this.

Since the 17th century, the palace was empty, and there were not any government officials. The abbot of the monastery and the representative of the Isfahan mission, Capuchin Pater Raphael du Mans in his essay in 1660 described Shirvanshah Palace in Baku fortress and gave information about its desolation and destruction. In 1723, Baku was besieged by the troops of Peter I, and the city was bombed. In this regard, the south-eastern facades of the palace suffered much. The palace was transferred to the Russian military department in the middle of the 19th century.

The Russian military department made a partial renovation of the palace. At the same time, the significant restructuring was carried out, which adapted the palace facilities to warehouses for military equipment. Repairs carried out by the military department, along with the restoration of the destroyed parts, and led to the destruction of a number of parts required for the restoration of the palace. By adapting the building of the palace to the warehouse, the military department demolished a number of walls separating the rooms in the second and first floors, and there were semicircular arches supporting the roof instead of them on the second floor.

The remains of domed, lancet and cross-slabs were destroyed in all the rooms on the second floor; they were replaced by flat beams. And window openings (double-glazed windows) of the second floor were laid out so that only small windows remained. New wide doorways were pierced.

During this period, the Eastern Orthodox Church in Baku sought the demolition of the palace to build a Baku cathedral in its place. However, this petition was rejected by the tsarist authorities only because the premises of the palace were used for large warehouses.

There was an entrance made to the second floor of the northern facade of the palace, and a huge opening was punched in the wall. This was done so that the cart drawn by the horses from the street could enter the second floor of the palace. After making the above-mentioned reorganization, the military department attached a ladder to the eastern facade of the palace, and the entire southern (or lower) courtyard was surrounded by a stone wall with loopholes. This wall was erected from a foundation left from the old walls surrounding the palace. The palace ensemble is now protected by fortress walls erected in the first half of the 19th century.

During the existence of the Azerbaijan Democratic Republic (1918–1920), a number of measures were taken to study and fix architectural monuments. Thus, at the end of 1918, the dimensional drawings of the Shirvanshahs Palace were made by the Ishmael Bek Nabi oglu, the architectural engineer. At the beginning of 1920, several cycles of lectures on the fate of the palace were read in the "Society for the Study of the Muslim East" by Ismail bek Nabi oglu. The periodical press indicated that the report was illustrated by various photographs and drawings of the palace. After the reports and debates, the presidium of the society was elected, which included chairman Professor Zimin, Comrade chairman I Belyaev, secretary-teacher Seidov and Kazioni Subkhanverdikhanov. The meeting instructed the presidium to organize an excursion to the palace in the near future.

In 1920, the government of the Azerbaijani SSR began to take measures to protect the monument. Since 1920, the cleaning of the palace from the age-old layers of garbage and partial repairs began, accompanied by archaeological reconnaissance.

In 1924, the works were continued. After the extensive repair and restoration works of 1932–1934, conducted by AzCUOP together with the Moscow State Restoration Workshops for projects designed by architect Boris Zasypkin, the building of the former Shirvanshah palace was given to the Azerbaijan History Museum AzFAN. Since the clay floors were fragile, and the building of the palace was intended for the organization of a museum in it, during the repair and restoration work the floors were covered with parquet. Also, during the works from the window openings were laid the stones laid in the 19th century, and they were returned to their original appearance. The original layout of the second floor was not restored, due to the fact that the premises were supposed to be a museum: where there are only two rooms, there were originally eight rooms. The plan of the first floor was completely restored.

In 1937–1938 under the guidance of archaeologist Vadim Leviatov, archaeological excavations were carried out in the palace and a large number of artifacts dating from the 12th–15th centuries were found. The archaeological excavations conducted by Leviatov in 1945 on the territory of the palace ensemble, deep beneath the foundations of the surviving buildings, revealed the remains of a once densely populated residential quarter. Numerous fragments of ceramic products and coins date it to the 8th–9th centuries.

For some time, the Azerbaijan People's Museum and the Museum of the History of Religion were located in the palace building. In 1960, the palace was turned into an architectural reserve, which in 1964 was transformed into the State Historical and Architectural Museum-Reserve "Complex of the Shirvanshahs Palace".

In 1992, new restoration works began. The author of the restoration project of the palace complex was Niyazi Rzayev. The restoration began from the throne room. In 2000, at the 24th session of the UNESCO World Heritage Committee, the historical part of the city of Baku, Icheri Sheher, along with the palace, was declared a UNESCO World Heritage Site from Azerbaijan. These were the first objects included in the list of UNESCO, located on the territory of Azerbaijan. In 2006, the next restoration of the palace was completed.

In 2017, the Maiden Tower and the Palace of the Shirvanshahs were awarded with the Certificate of Excellence.

== Architecture ==
=== The plan of the palace ===
1. The palace
2. Divan-khana
3. Seyid Mausoleum Yahya Bakuvi
4. The place of the destroyed Kei-Kubad mosque
5. The Eastern portal
6. The Palace Mosque
7. The Shrine
8. Place of bath
9. Ovdan.

==== The main building (the palace) ====
The building of the palace did not arise at once. The building of the complex was started in 1411 by Shirvanshah Sheykh Ibrahim I. The two-storey building of the palace numbers about 50 dimensions and outlines of the constructions connected with three narrow winding staircases. The big lancet portal directly leads from the courtyard to the second floor, into a high octahedral lodging covered with a cupola. A small, octagonal vestibule behind it connects it with the rest of the lodgings in the palace.

The earliest building (approximately the end of the fourteenth century) is the central part (octagonal hall of the second floor). The part adjoining the western facade was added a little later. The western, northern and a small part of the eastern facades form an incomplete rectangle. The rest of the eastern facade and the entire southern facade are formed by two triangular lanterns and a broken line between them, enclosing four right angles.

There were originally 52 rooms connected by three narrow spiral staircases in the palace building: 27 on the first and 25 on the second floor (currently 16 rooms on the second floor), and the layout of the second floor basically reproduced the plan of the first floor. The central part of the palace (octagonal hall on the second floor, the entrance to which is decorated with a portal) has thicker walls. Arranged on the western facade, the main entrance to the palace is decorated with a high portal. The ladder of the portal leads to a tall octagonal front hall, covered with a dome. It is assumed that this room served for receptions.

The small octagonal lobby behind it connected the hall to the rest of the rooms. Slit-shaped holes in the faces served as a voice connection with the lower floor, where the office premises were located. The rooms and rooms of the second floor are more ceremonial. Among them, there are the southern and eastern facades with bay windows that reveal the bay view. There are also rooms for the Shah and his family on the second floor.

The smooth surface of the large stone planes of the palace is shaded by alternating rows of masonry, differing in color, width and texture, as well as the "shebeke" aura – stone gratings in small light apertures.

There were daily-life objects, coins from the 12th to 15th centuries, copper utensils, weapons and decorations of the 19th century, musical instruments of the 15th century found during the archaeological excavations both on the territory of the palace complex and in the territory of the historical center of Icheri-Sheher and Shirvan. There were also female costumes and embroidery of the 19th century, Shemakha carpets of the 19th century and carpets woven in the 17th century in Baku. There is a mock-up of the historic part of the city in the center of the hall.

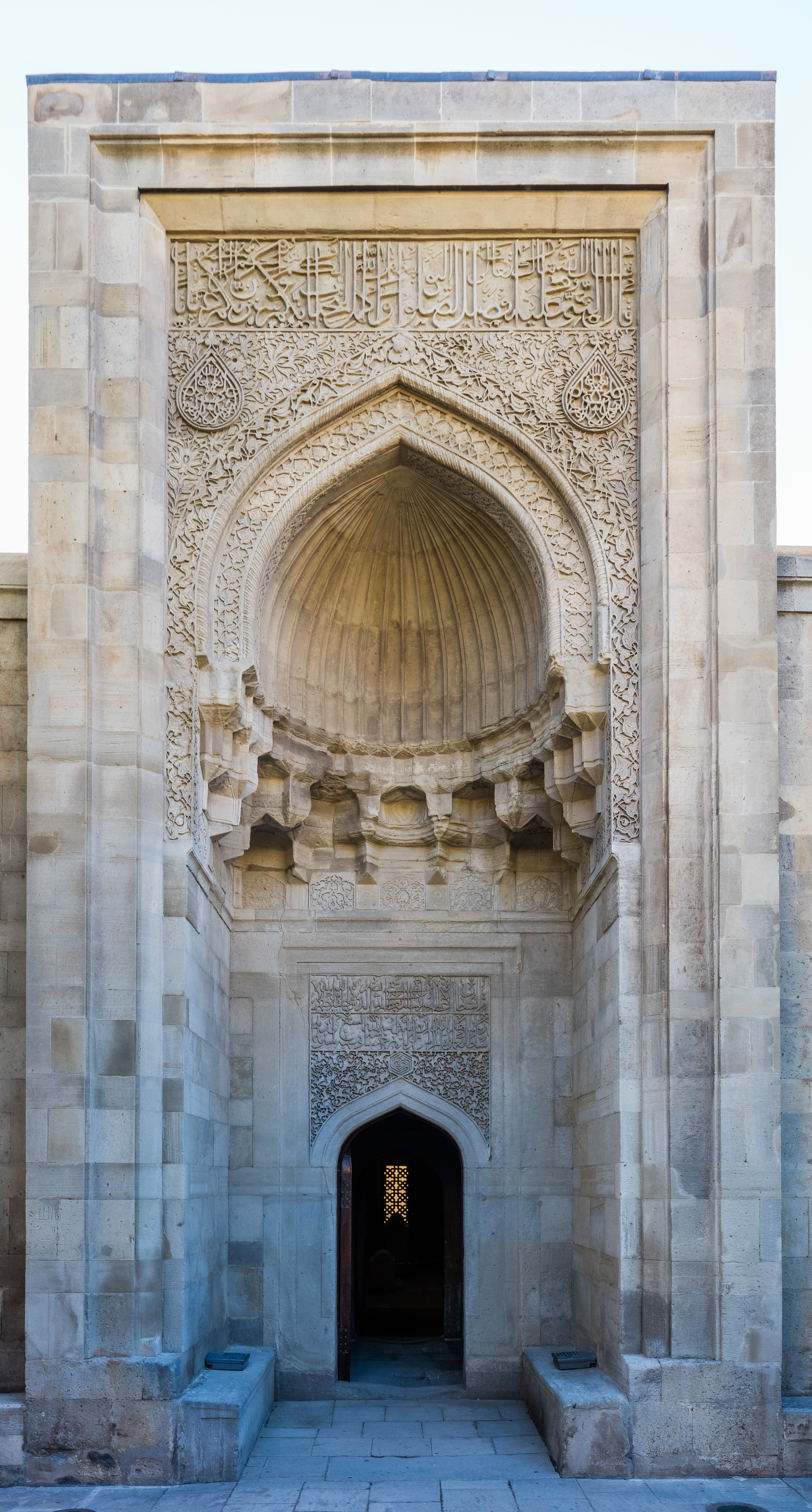
Turbe (Mausoleum) of Shirvanshahs in Baku, 15th century

==== Divan-khana ====
A small aperture, located on the north side of the palace garden, leads to the closed courtyard Divan-khana, which is framed on three sides by a pointed arcade. In the composition center, Divan-khana there is an octagonal rotunda-pavilion. The hall of this rotunda is surrounded by an open arcade of the same warrant. The elliptical cover with a slightly pointed top is protected from the outside by a faceted stone dome. The western facade of the rotunda is decorated with arabesques which are stylized with a portal, the channeled half-cupola of the lancet conch is supported by a system of finely modeled stalactites (mucarnases). Overhead planes are covered with ornament. The portal leads to the canopy connecting the hall with the service rooms located one above the other.

There are several versions of the appointment of Divan-khana. It was supposed to serve as a building for legal proceedings, receptions or state council, or perhaps, it was a mausoleum. The most common hypothesis is based on the common name of the monument, according to which it was assumed that it is a court, or a reception room of the palace, or the building of an "order". The features of the style and the incompleteness of the part of the decoration work allow one to date Divan-khana to the end of the 15th century, the time of the capture of Baku by the Safavid troops. The features of the plan, the dungeon-crypt and the content of the lapidary inscription above the entrance to the hall (Koran, Sura 10, verses 26 and 27) indicate his memorial appointment.

The origin of the original architectural structure is also associated with the pre-Islamic funerary tradition. Historian Sara Ashurbeyli believes that even in pre-Islamic times, the occupied Divan-khan territory was a sacred place (it is assumed that the cup-shaped grooves served to collect the sacrificial blood of animals)

==== The Keygubad Mosque ====
In the old days, a mosque was added to the mausoleum of Seyyid Yahya Bakuvi, which was called the "old" mosque. It is known as the "Kei-Kubad Mosque". This mosque was built at the end of the fourteenth and the beginning of the fifteenth century after the destruction of the older building on which it was built. The mosque was covered with a dome, which was supported by four stone columns that stood inside the mosque. The clutches of the mosque were tied up with the laying of the mausoleum. In 1918, the "old" mosque burned down during a fire. The image of this mosque and its brief description was given in the article of Andrei Pavlinov, who visited Baku and saw the mosque in 1888, published in the third issue of the journal "Materials on the Archeology of the Caucasus" (Moscow, 1893) Historian Abbasgulu Bakikhanov wrote that Bakuvi taught and prayed in the mosque: "The cell where he prayed, the school where he worked and his grave are there, in the mosque". Keygubad Shirvanshah ruled from 1317 to 1343 and was Sheikh Ibrahim's grandfather.

In the 1920s, when E. A Pakhomov surveyed the mausoleum and ruins of the old mosque, it was discovered that the pedestal on which the base of one of the mosque columns stood, covers a narrow trench made in the ground and plastered into the crypt of the mausoleum. In this trench, there were several stone tombstones. When examining the crypt, it was found that there were scattered bones of twenty human skeletons. The bones were folded without observing any rules. This is due to the fact that at the place where the mausoleum stood and around it, there was once a cemetery. And during the construction of the mosque and digging foundation pits under the foundations, a number of burials were broken. Bones from the broken graves were collected and stacked in the mausoleum, and gravestones – in the trench. These tombstones are not preserved. Currently, on the site where the mosque once stood, there are two columns that once stood inside the mosque, as well as part of the wall with the roof.

==== Mausoleum of Seyyid Yahya Bakuvi ====
In the southern courtyard, next to the palace, stands a mausoleum, built in the second half of the 15th century, called the mausoleum of the "dervish" and known as the burial of the court scholar Khalil Ili Seyid Yahya Bakuvi, who was engaged in medicine, mathematics, and astrology. The mausoleum has an octagonal body, which completes the pyramidal tent. The interior of the mausoleum consists of an underground crypt where the tombstone of Bakuvi is located, and a camera above it. The small octagonal volume of the mausoleum turns into a drum covered with a dome. On the sides of the mausoleum there are three small windows carved into solid slabs of limestone, and, like in the old days, they are through-through stone gratings, consisting of multibeam stars. The archway in the northern part connects the mausoleum with an older mosque. According to Abbaskuli aga Bakikhanov, "the cell where he prayed [Bakuvi], the school and the grave that are under the mosque named after him, still exist today".

==== The palace mosque ====
In the front of the lower courtyard, there is a mosque building with a minaret. In terms of the mosque is rectangular, has a large hall, a small women's chapel and service rooms. The northern portal is facing the Shirvanshahs burial vault. This portal is more solemn than the east, which was intended for the inhabitants of the palace, descending the semi-underground passage. The double-lighted is covered with a dome on spherical sails.

Mihrab mosque is located at the southern end of the hall. Above the one-woman women's chapel, there is also a domed room. It is inferior in size to the dome of the hall and repeats its outlines. Against the backdrop of the prismatic volume, completed by two domes with slightly pointed tunnels, a deeply shaded aperture of the mosque portal is clearly drawn.

Above the northeast corner of the mosque stands a minaret, ending with a stalactite cornice supporting a balcony that had a stone barrier before. The inscription encircles the minaret below the stalactite cornice. It is executed in the font "nash" and contains an inscription. The inscription tells about the construction of the minaret, but not the mosque that was built at an earlier time. This is confirmed by the lack of a decorated rich portal and artistic inscriptions on it.

==== The Eastern Portal ====
On the territory of the southern courtyard of the complex was the so-called Eastern Portal, also known as the "Gate of Murad". The construction of this portal completed the formation of the ensemble. Judging by the inscription on the portal niche, the portal was built during the years of occupation of Baku by Ottoman troops at the behest of a noble Bakrada of the Rajab Baba in 994 AH (1585/86) by architect Amir Shah of Vaillankoukh (suburb of Tabriz). Compared with the Divan-khana portals and the Shirvanshahs burial vault, the structure and forms of the portal are somewhat simplified. It has a less rich and elegant decor. The upper part of the portal is decorated with a building inscription in Arabic.

The inscription has sockets with floral ornaments on both sides. In the lower part of the portal, there is a deep niche formed by a stalactite semi-double. Unlike other portals of the palace, the Eastern portal has a wide lancet entrance opening, similar to the gate. Sarah Ashurbeyli assumes that this structure was the entrance to a building that did not survive, or was not erected.

==== Shrine ====
Near the shah's mosque in the lower courtyard, in the wall separating the lower platform from the upper one, is located the building of the Shirvanshahs burial vault, the so-called "Turbe". This building is located directly opposite the entrance, overlapped by a pointed vault. The smooth wall of the facade is lined with Baku limestone with a careful fit of the seams. Above the building, there is a richly decorated portal to the tomb. This portal repeats the compositional reception of the Divan-khan portal, but in comparison with the latter it is somewhat easier to interpret (the stalactite arch consists of only four rows of stalactites, the side walls are smoothly solved, no niches, and only tympanum of the arches, a number of inscriptions in the font "nash" – Koranic (Surah XII, verse 92nd) and hadith.

On the right and left of the portal's lancet aperture in two onion-shaped medallions are inscriptions with the name of the builder-architect of the tomb. In each medallion, the same inscription is repeated twice (in direct and mirror image) and contains the following words: Allah Muhammad Ali (an architect). Judging by the name, the architect was a Shiite. Above the ornamentation of the tympanum of the stalactite arch, there is a strip with an inscription of a religious nature. In the tympanas, medallions are also arranged on each side, also with an inscription. The inscription above the entrance to the portal dates the construction of the burial vault 839 (1435/36) and reports that the tomb was built by Shirvanshah Halilullah for his mother and son.

The portal leads to the canopy, on the right and left side of which are located associated with the opening of small rooms, probably intended for ministers of worship. The canopies lead to the main hall, which is cross-shaped in plan, and its central part is covered with a dome resting on the vaults of the branches of the cross and stone walls through a system of spherical sails. It is interesting that outside, the stone dome was once covered with turquoise glaze.

During the archaeological excavations in the tomb were found fragments of architectural details of tombstones in the hall, as well as a number of burials of members of the family of Halilullah. So, archaeological works in 1946 under the wooden floor of the tomb, a crypt was found with five burials, covered with stone slabs (one of them contained the remains of a child of 6–7 years old, apparently the son of Halilullah, the other – older women, probably the mother of Halilullah, the skeleton of a man is 18–19 years old). The continuation of the work in the tomb found a number of untouched tombs, the total number of which reached 14. The names of the members of the family of Halilullah can be found on the basis of odes, elegies and chronograms from the sofa of Badr Shirvani: the mother of Halilullah Bike khanum (died 839 AH / 1435/6), his sons Farrukh Yamin (born 839 AH / 1435/6, died in 846 AH / 1442/3 at the age of seven), Sheikh Saleh (born in 847 AH / 1443, died in 849 AH / 1445/6 at the age of 2 years), Mir Bahram (killed ( Shaheed) in the Kaytag steppe at a young age of 20 Muharram in 850 AH / 17 April 1446), Prince Muhammad Ibrahim (born 20 Muharram 836 / 16 September 1432), Farrukh Yasar (born 12 Muharram 845 AH / 2 June 1441).

==== Bathhouses ====
In the lower courtyard of the complex, there is a bathhouse, the location of which does not allow us to contour the territory that belonged to the palace. It is assumed, however, that the bathhouse, built in the 15th century, was indeed a palace. The bath was cleared of blockages, and the internal layout of the bath was restored thanks to the conservation of the lower rows of wall masonry.

The palace bath, like the vast majority of the baths of the East, was buried in the ground, but only the entrance portal and the domes of large halls were visible from the outside, the crowns of which ended with perforated lanterns that served as ventilation. Such a strong depth of the bath was typical for the baths of the entire Absheron peninsula.

The visitor of the bath from the vestibule-dressing room got into the soap-house, where there was a swimming pool for general ablution. To the soap, adjoining large and small rooms, intended for all procedures that required a different temperature. The necessary temperature of the various rooms, depending on their destination, was tried to preserve the internal layout of the bath. In one of the last chambers of the bathhouse, there was a tank with hot water. Under it, there was a firebox, which served to heat all the premises of the bath. The underground, the stables and the walls of the baths were heated by a branched system of heat-conducting channels.

==== Ovdan ====
Not far from the bathhouse is located the ovdan – a reservoir which was one of the largest in the Fortress of the Ovdans. This ovdan supplied drinking water not only to the palace, but also to the entire surrounding area. This assumption is confirmed by the nearby small, built in the 14th century Chin Mosque, which is believed to have served the residents of the nearby area. Ovdan supplied water to the palace bathhouse.

Ovdan is a spacious reservoir located deep underground, which was ventilated by means of a special vertical shaft. Such a structure is typical for most of the ovdans surviving until the present day. To descend into the reservoir was possible by a gentle staircase, which was blocked by a lancet arch.

Water came into the ovdan from a well-kept underground water pipe or kyhryza. The water intake structures of this water pipe were quite far from the city.

== In culture ==
Images of the Shirvanshahs palace can be found in the works of such artists as Grigory Gagarin, Georgy Hohenfelden, in the photographs of Richard Thiele. In 1990, the postage stamp of the USSR, dedicated to the palace, was issued. Later, the image of the palace appeared on the postage stamps of the Republic of Azerbaijan. Also, Shirvanshah's palace was depicted on an Azerbaijani banknote with a face value of 10,000 manats. In June 2022, the Central Bank of Azerbaijan issued a new banknote that also shows Shirvanshahs Palace in the background. Description of the palace is found in the novel of Kurban Said "Ali and Nino."

=== Palace complex in cinematography ===
The architecture of the palace several times fell into the footage of Leonid Gaidai's film The Diamond Arm (1969), which was also filmed in the "old city" of Baku.

== Gallery ==
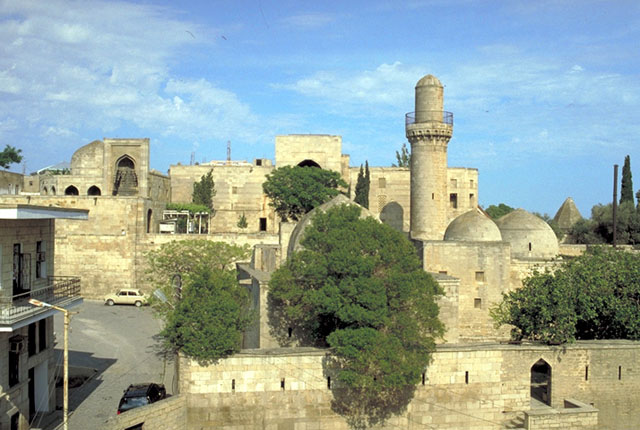

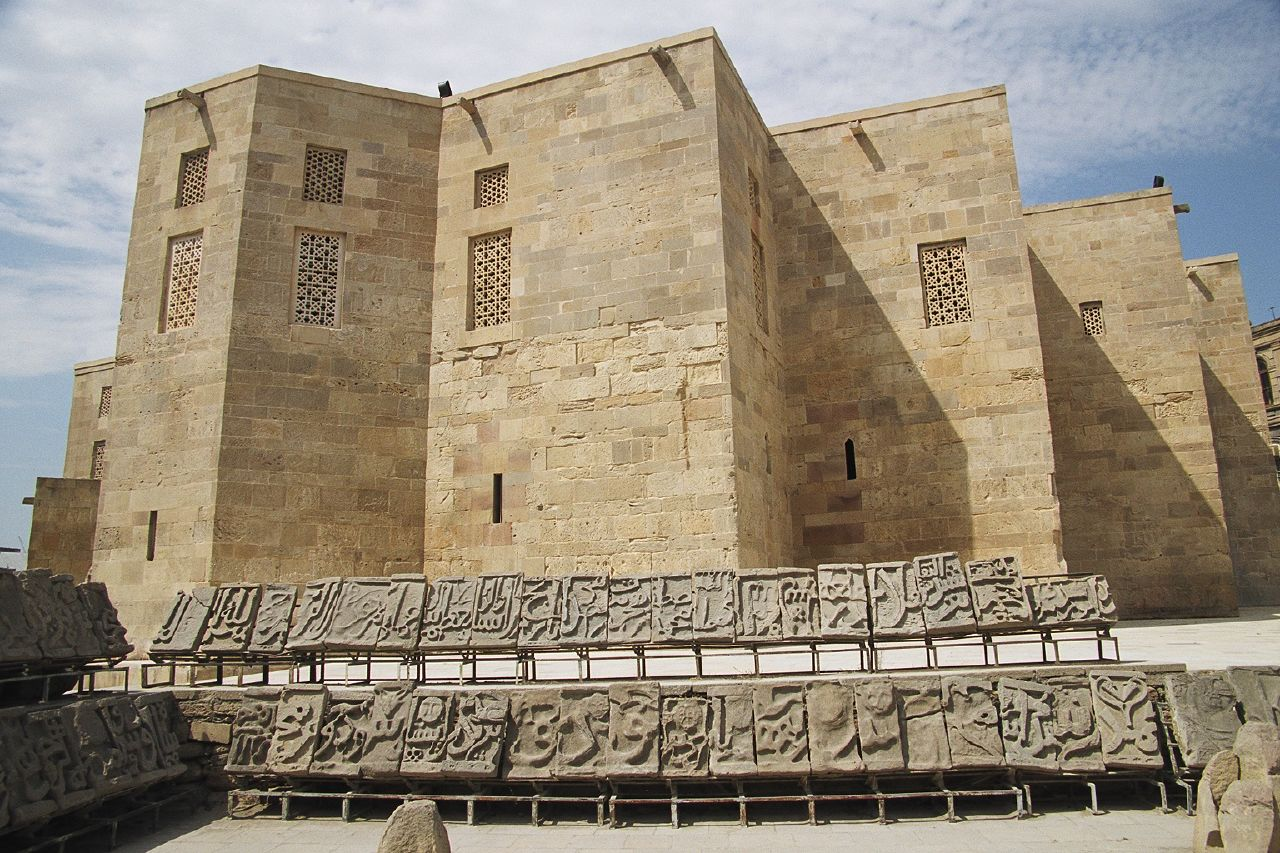

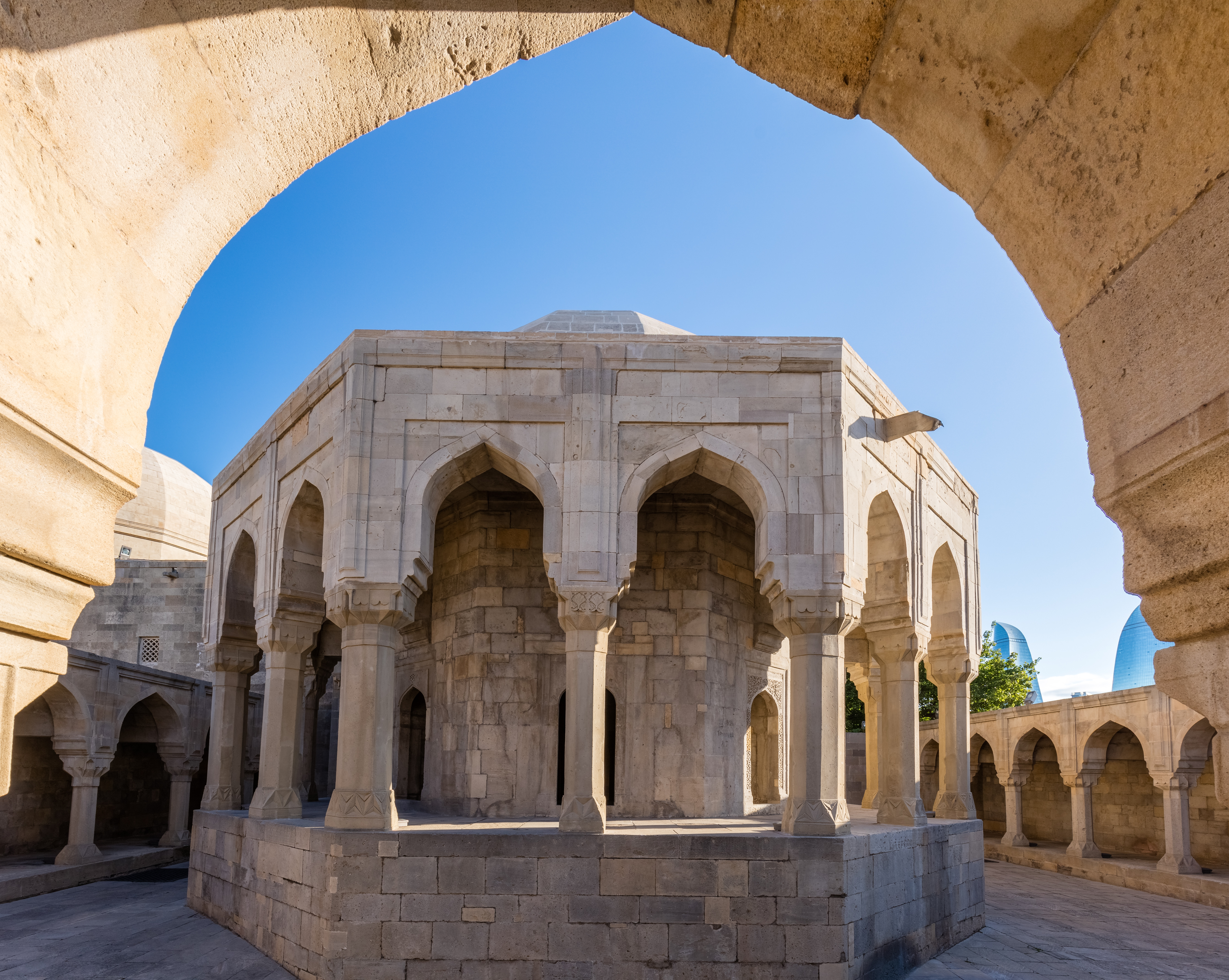

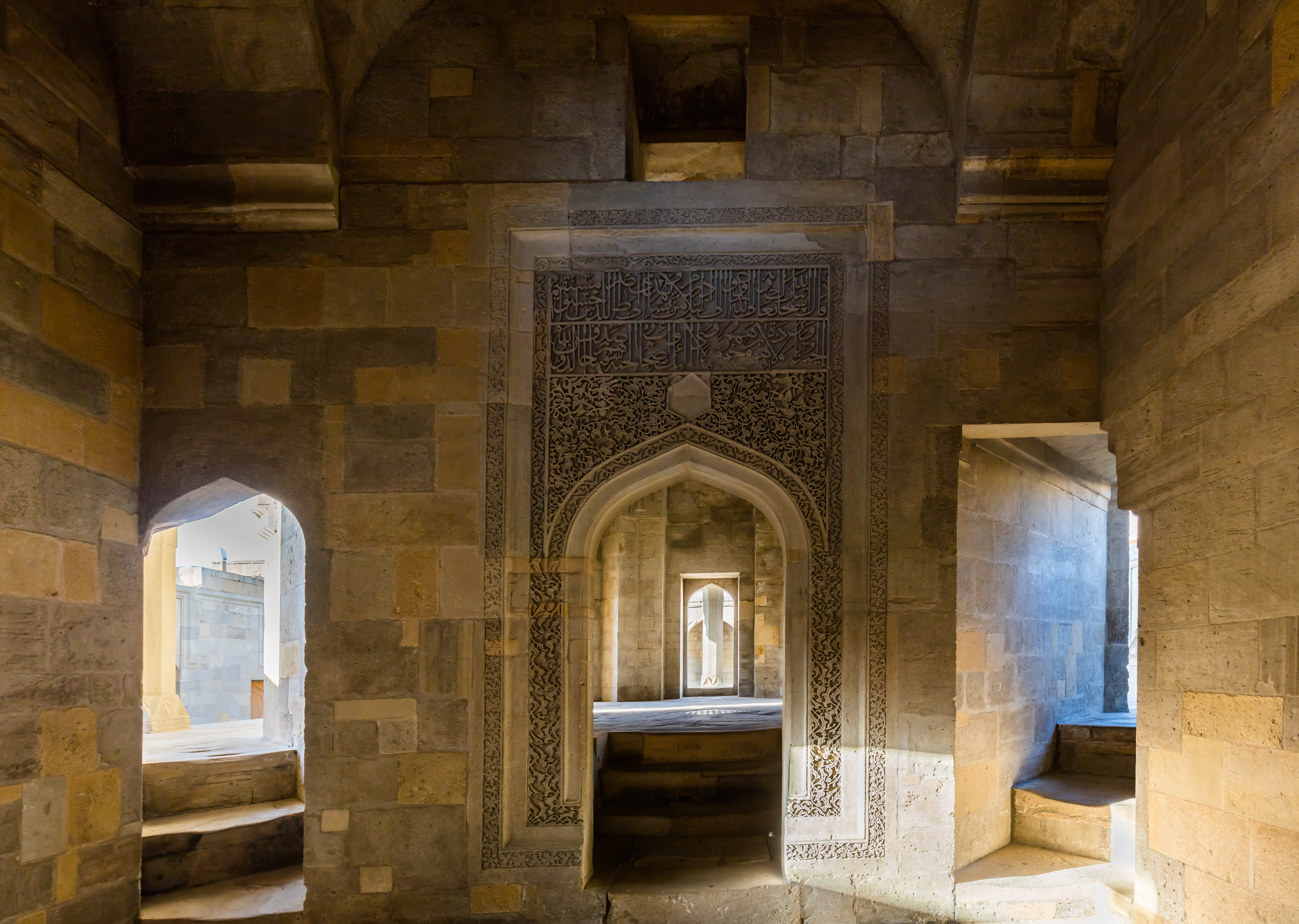

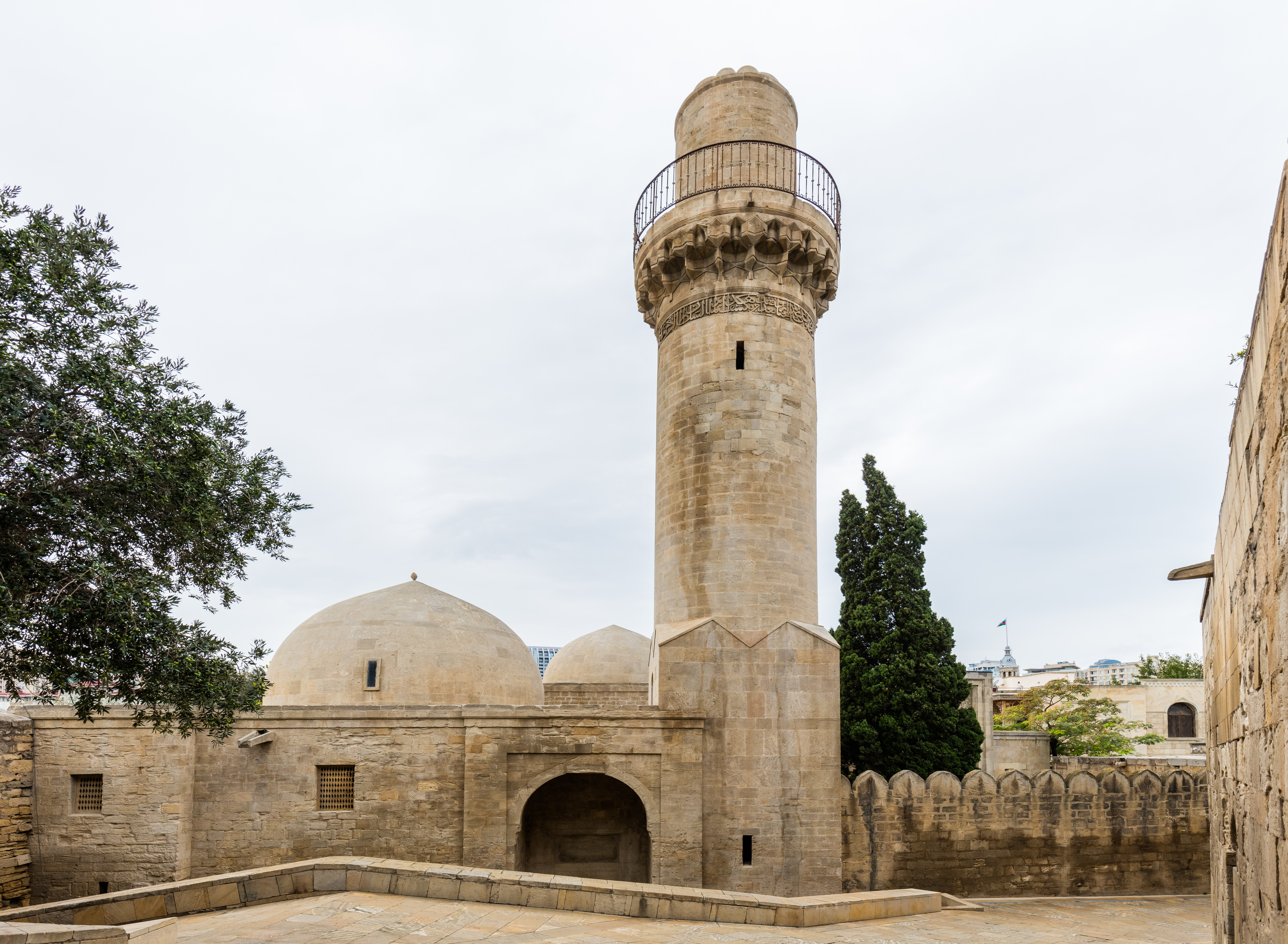

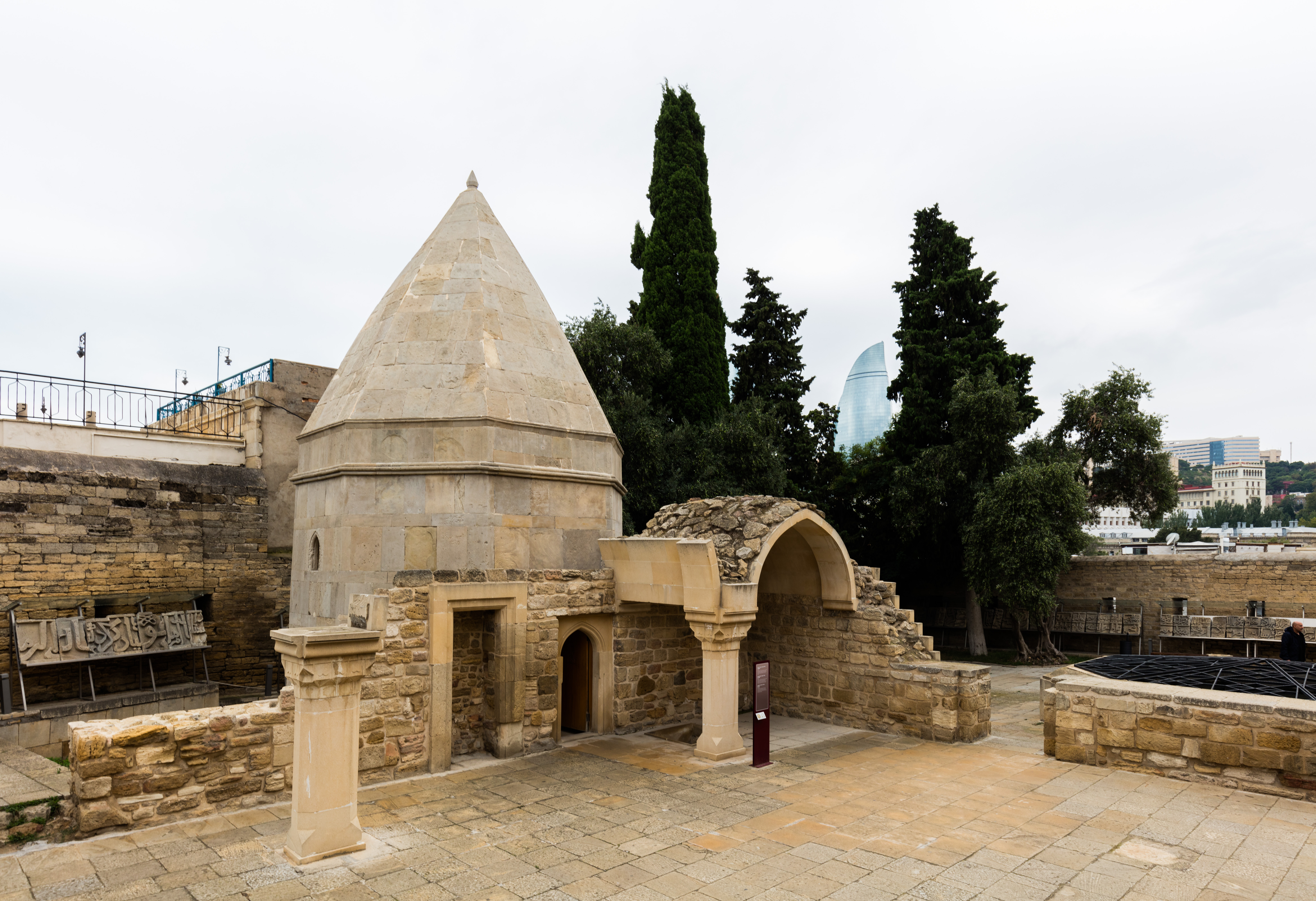

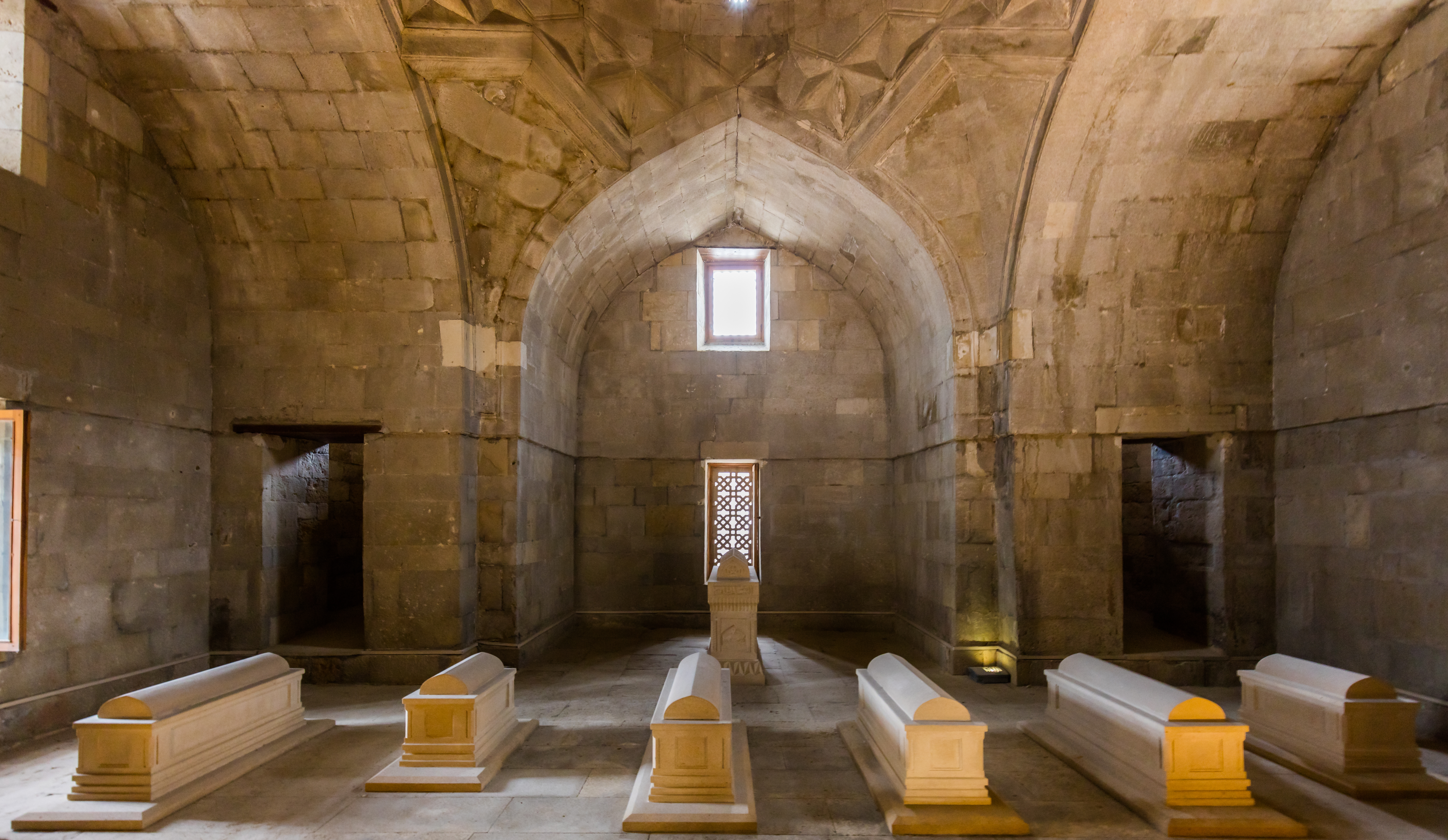

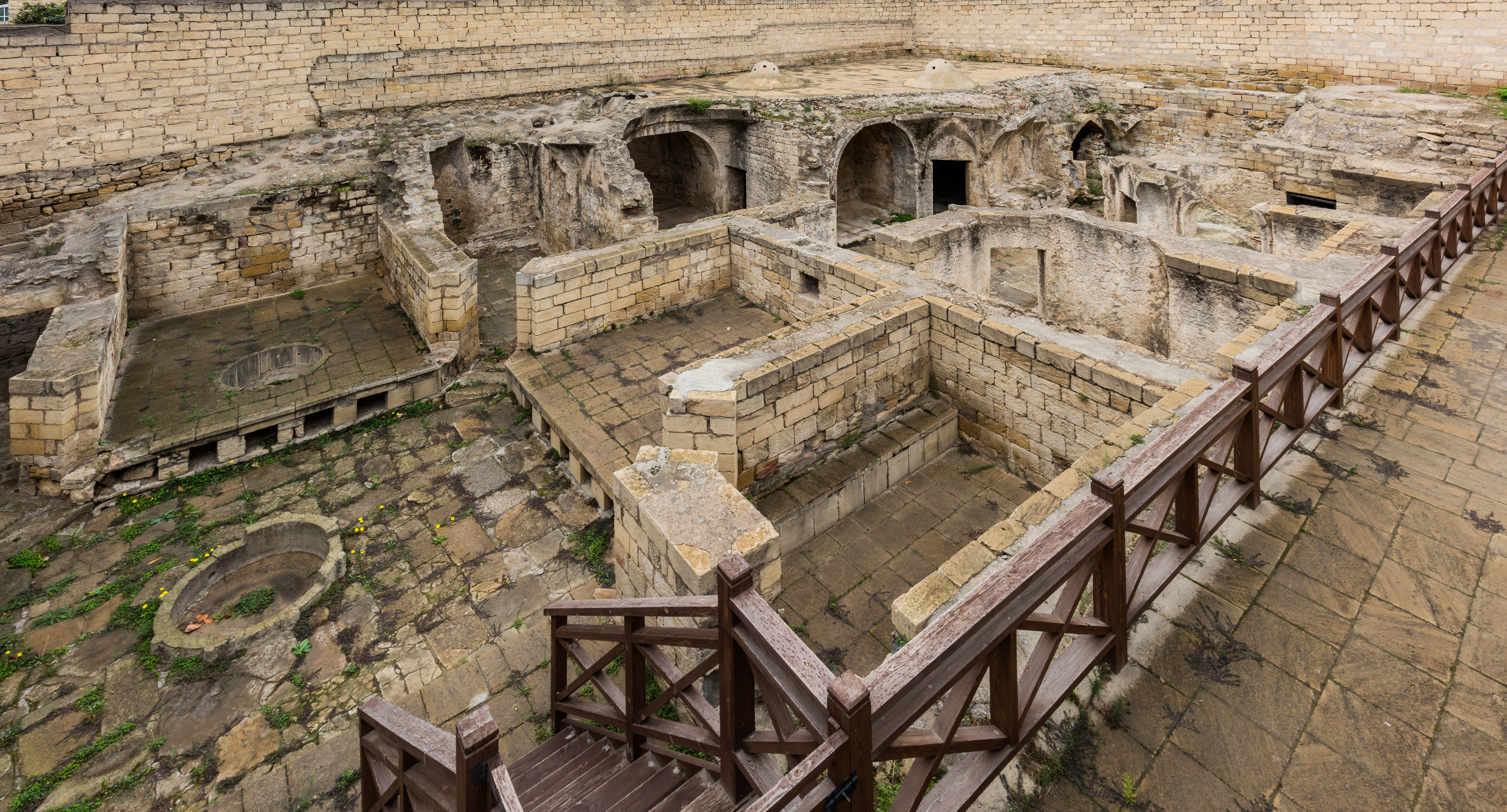

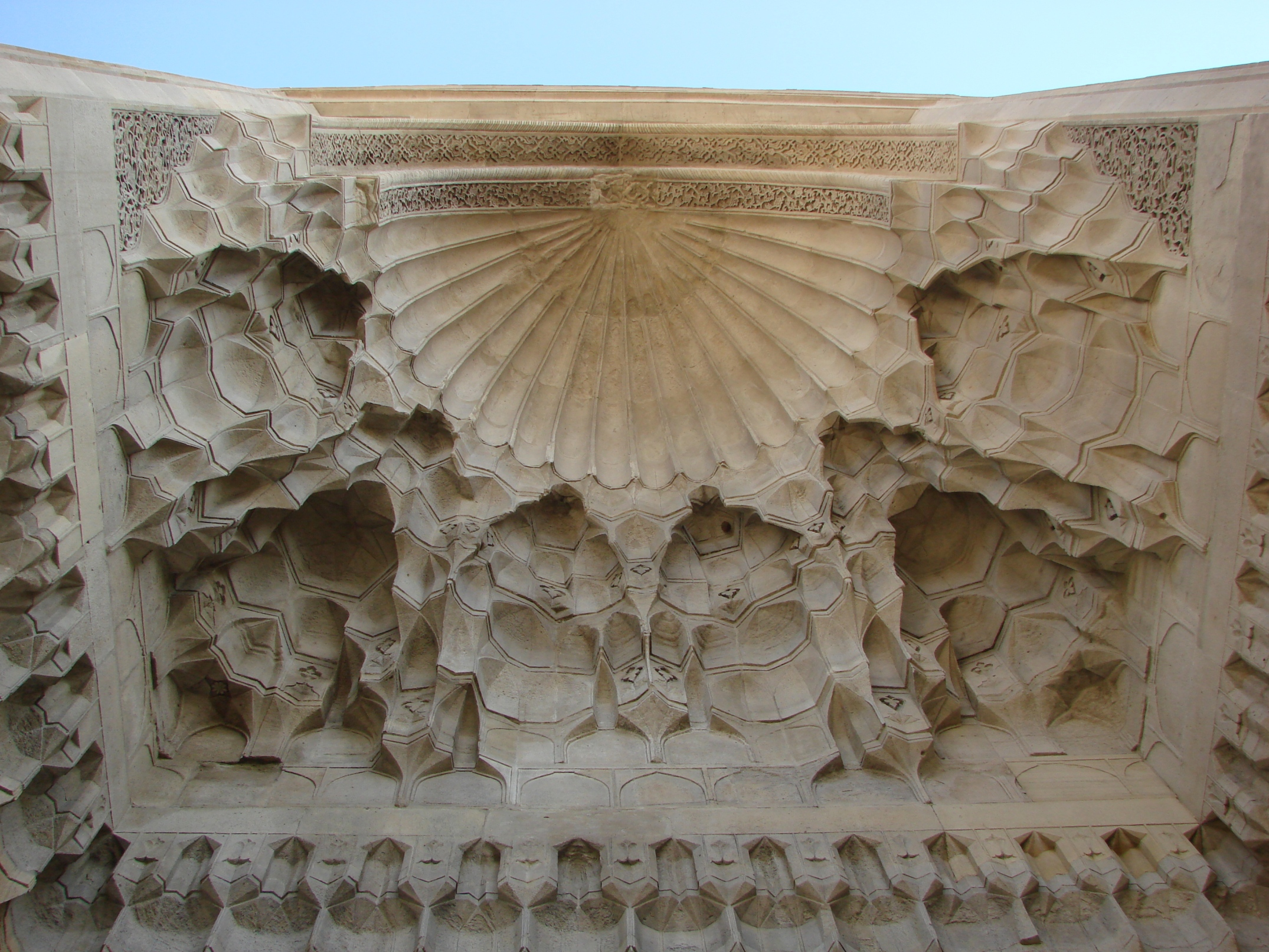

== See also ==
- Shirvanshahs' bath houses
- List of World Heritage Sites in Azerbaijan
- Old City (Baku)
- Architecture of Azerbaijan

== Literature ==
Jonathan M. Bloom, Sheila Blair. The Grove Encyclopedia of Islamic Art and Architecture. – Oxford University Press, 2009. – Т. 2. – С. 240. – 513 pp. – ISBN 9780195309911.
