= Murad's Gate =

Murad’s Gate
- Azerbaijani: Murad darvazası Persian: دروازه مراد
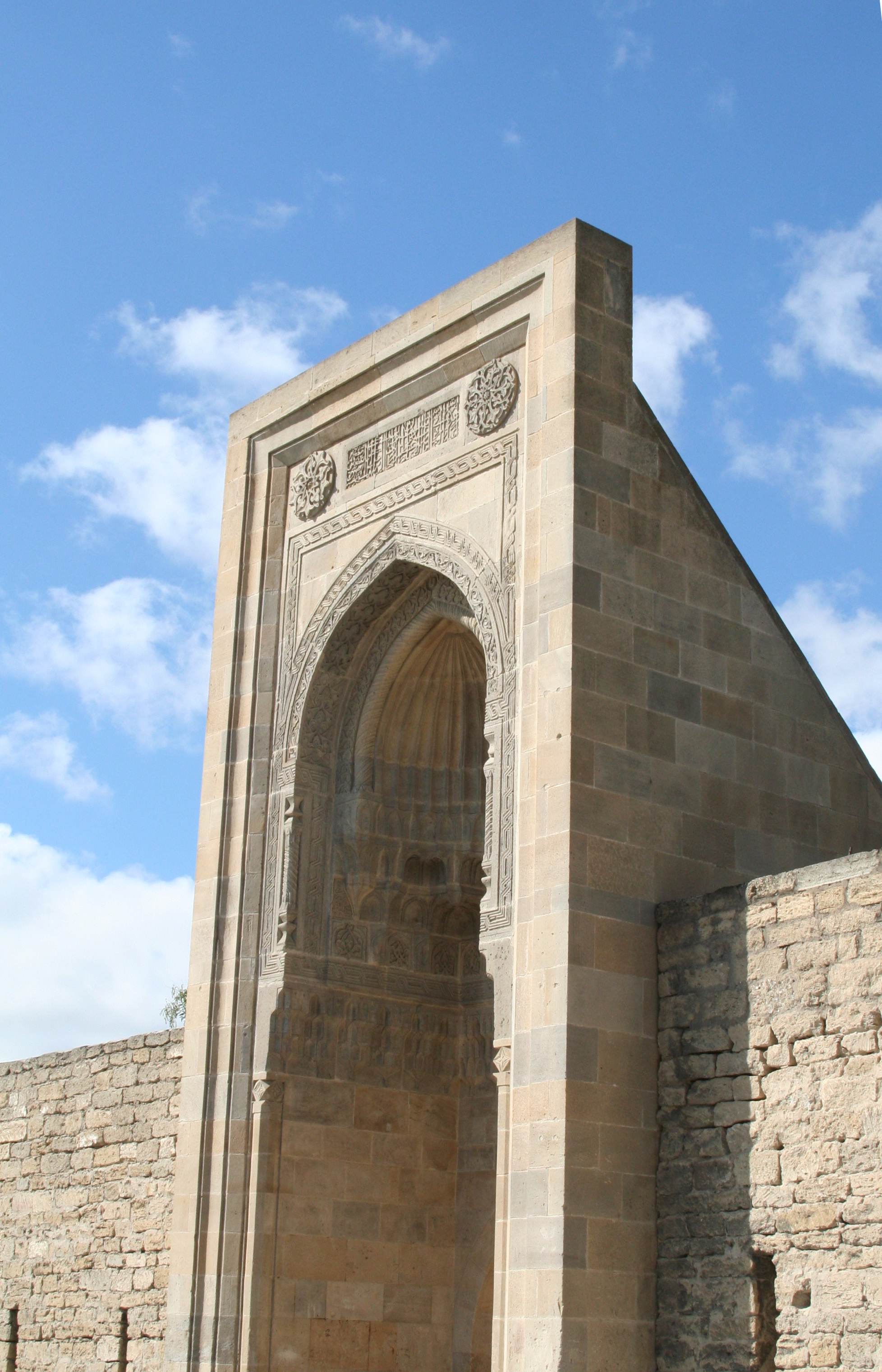
- General view of the gate
- Interactive map of Murad’s Gate
- Location: Old City, Baku, Azerbaijan
- Coordinates: 40°21′58″N 49°50′14″E
- Designer: Amirshah Tabrizi
- Type: Portal
- Completion date: 1585

UNESCO World Heritage Site
- Official name: Murad's Gate
- Type: Cultural
- Criteria: iv
- Designated: 2000 (24th session)
- Part of: Walled City of Baku with the Shirvanshah's Palace and Maiden Tower
- Reference no.: 958
- Region: Europe/Asia
- Endangered: 2003–2009

Murad's Gate (Azerbaijani: Murad Darvazası, Persian: دروازه مراد) is a large portal located in the eastern wall of the Palace of the Shirvanshahs complex's central courtyard in the Old City of Baku, Azerbaijan. It is the only building of the 16th century on the territory of the complex.

The Murad's Gate forms part of the UNESCO World Heritage-listed Palace of the Shirvanshahs.

== History ==
=== Historical setting ===
In 1576, after the death of Shah Tahmasib I, his successor, Shah Ismail II, ascends the throne. The new ruler, not respecting the terms of the Amasia treaty concluded in 1555, is trying to win over the Ottoman emirs to his side. Therefore, the Ottoman Sultan Murad III instructs the beylerbey Vana to ensure the stability in the region. The relations become even more tense after the Safavid wali of Luristan joins the Ottomans. After the death of Shah Ismail II in 1577, the struggle for the throne began. In such a difficult political situation for the Safavid state, Sultan Murad III declares it war.

The war, which covered the 1578-1590s, was fought on the Caucasian front in the north, and on the Iraqi front in the south. In 1578, Muhammad Khudabende ascended the Safavid throne. As a result of the Childir battle that took place on 9 August 1578 between the Ottoman and the Safavid armies, the last lost the control over all of Georgia, including Tiflis. As a result of the battle between the Ottomans and the Safavids in 1583, Dagestan and Shirvan came under the control of the Ottomans. Their borders in the east expanded as much as possible, and they for the first time got access to the Caspian Sea. According to the Istanbul Treaty, signed by the Ottomans and the Safavids in 1590, it was recognized the transfer of the entire Shirvan to the Ottomans’ rule.

=== Construction ===
Murad's Gate is the only building of the 16th century on the territory of the Shirvanshahs’ Palace complex. The Arabic inscription between the two medallions at the top of the portal reads:

He ordered to build this noble building during the reign of the justest and greatest Sultan Murad III, Ulu Rajab Baba Bakuvi in 994 hijri year. (1585-1586 - according to the Gregorian calendar)

It was built by the Tabriz architect Amirshah.

=== Function ===
If you pay attention to the general plan of the palace's complex, it becomes obvious that in this part of the courtyard there is not even a single door through which you can get into the palace building. Therefore, the portal is, as it was, isolated and not "tied" with the walls adjacent to it. The portal is built of good quality facing stones with fine seams well cut. The wall, made of roughly hewn stones, neither in size nor at the seams, does not correspond to the masonry of the portal and gives the impression of a temporary nature and a later origin. S. Dadashov and M. Useynov note that, perhaps, one of the rulers wanted to build a building here, but something prevented him from. In addition, according to the inscription on the portal, it was ordered to build a building here, and not a gate.

== Architectural features ==
The portal is located in the eastern wall of the central courtyard of the Shirvanshahs’ Palace complex. Architecturally, it is sustained in the style of the sofa and the tomb of the Shirvanshahs, but in terms of the processing and decoration quality it is inferior to them.

In the portals of the sofa and the Shirvanshahs’ tomb, a low but well-drawn doorway, was a kind of scale, thanks to which the impression of great monumentality and even the grandeur of the portal itself was created. This is not the case here. The entrance part of the portal with a wide, low, disproportionate opening significantly weakens the overall impression.

== See also ==
- Old City
- Maiden Tower
- Shirvanshah's Palace Mausoleum

== Literature ==
- İbrahimov, Kamil (2006). İçərişəhər (PDF). Baku: Çinar-Çap. p. 256. ISBN 5-565-003-80-6.
- Dadashov, Sadig; Useynov, Mikayil (1955). Bakının memarlıq abidələri. Baku: Azərbaycan SSR Elmlər Akademiyası Nəşriyyatı.
