= Lionel Barthold =

American electrical engineer

- Born: Lionel O. Barthold; March 20, 1926; Great Barrington, Massachusetts, U.S.
- Died: September 24, 2025 (aged 99); Lake George, New York, U.S.
- Education: Northwestern University
- Occupation: Electrical engineer

Lionel O. Barthold (March 20, 1926 – September 24, 2025) was an American electrical engineer.

== Life and career ==
Barthold was born in Great Barrington, Massachusetts, and was raised in Winnetka, Illinois. He dropped out of high school, and worked as a radio officer during World War II. After the war ended, he attended Northwestern University, earning his degree in physics in 1950, which after earning his degree, he worked for Public Service Company of Indiana, and served in the United States Army during the Korean War.

Barthold worked as a cadet engineer at the General Electric Company until his resignation in 1969. After resigning, he established Power Technologies Inc. (PTI) in Schenectady, New York. In 1972, he was named a fellow of the Institute of Electrical and Electronics Engineers, "for contributions to EHV and UHV technology". In 1986, he retired as president from PTI, and in 1987, he was elected as a member of the National Academy of Engineering.

== Death ==
Barthold died in Lake George, New York on September 24, 2025, at the age of 99.
