= Charles Barthold =

American photojournalist

Charles Barthold is a news photographer for WHO-TV of Des Moines, Iowa, who won the 1976 Peabody Award for his film and photography of the Jordan Tornado in Jordan, Iowa. The film and video he shot allowed famed University of Chicago meteorologist Ted Fujita to clearly see that one of the tornadoes was an anticyclonic tornado. The Barthold film was the first time that such a tornado had been captured on film and opened up a branch of tornado study to determine how the anticyclonic vortex formed.
