= Gulustan Palace =

Convention centre in Azerbaijan

Gülüstan Palace Gülüstan sarayı
- Exterior of Gülüstan Palace
- Interactive map of Gülüstan Palace; Gülüstan sarayı
- Former names: Gulustan Wedding Palace Complex; Gülüstan şadlıq sarayı kompleksi
- Location: 1 Istiglaliyyat Street, Baku, Azerbaijan
- Coordinates: 40.2131°N 49.4950°E
- Owner: Republic of Azerbaijan
- Type: Convention center

Construction
- Built: 1970-1980
- Opened: 1980
- Renovated: 1998; 2020

Gulustan Palace (Azerbaijani: Gülüstan sarayı), known as Gulustan Wedding Palace Complex during the Soviet era, is the main state convention center of the Azerbaijani government. It is located on Baku's highland, on Istiglaliyyat Street overlooking the whole city of Baku and Baku Bay. The palace serves as an official facility for governmental and non-governmental organizations holding various types of formal events. It is notable for having hosted important events such as significant oil and gas contracts, international and state conferences.

== History ==
The Gulustan Palace began the process of construction in 1970 at the initiative of First Secretary Heydar Aliyev and the oversight of chief city architect Alish Lambaranski. It was also designed by H. Amirkhanov, N. Hajibeyov, T. Sharinski, F. Rustamova, N. İsmayilov, K. Kerimov and Abbas Alasgarov. It was opened in 1980 and renovated in 1998. In 1982, the architects of the building received the State Award of the Azerbaijan SSR. It was built for mass events including republic wide and city events. National events have been held in the palace, including events for the 20th anniversary of Azerbaijan’s independence and the Baku Humanitarian Forum of 2011. The biggest event held in Gulustan palace was signing ceremony of the “Contract of the century” which played a huge role in structuring the Economy of Azerbaijan.

In June 2020, the rebuilding of the palace took place under a commission led by Prime Minister Ali Asadov. The 600-seat main hall at the Gulf Palace, as well as the Eastern Hall and the Conference Hall, were rebuilt at a modern level.

== Building plan ==
The palace has two floors and a basement. It also has cinema for 100 seats, café for children with 40 seats, 2 bars with 129 and 79 seats, disco rooms, wardrobes, souvenir shop. The second floor has a hall with 960 seats. In addition, it consists of a restaurant with 179 seats and banquet room with 149 seats. The building volume of the palace is 79,424 m^{3}, and the usable area is 8,525 m^{2}.

== See also ==
- Heydar Aliyev Palace
- Azerbaijan State Philharmonic Hall
- Buta Palace
- Heydar Aliyev Sports and Exhibition Complex
