= The Declaration of Independence monument (Baku) =

Monument in Baku, Azerbaijan

Coordinates: 40.36817°N 49.832698°E

The Declaration of Independence monument was erected on the Istiglaliyyat Street in honor of the Azerbaijan Democratic Republic, and was opened on May 25, 2007. The monument is located between the buildings of the Institute of Manuscripts of the National Academy of Sciences and the Azerbaijan State Economic University. The Declaration of Independence proclaimed by the National Council of Azerbaijan on May 28, 1918 in Tiflis city, Georgia. This day is celebrated as Republic Day since May 28, 1992.

== Opening of the monument ==
On December 18, 2006, President of Azerbaijan Ilham Aliyev signed Order No. 1838 on the creation of the Museum of Independence and the establishment of the Monument of Independence in the capital of the Republic Azerbaijan, Baku. In accordance with the decree, a competition was announced to create a monument of Independence. The opening of the monument took place on May 25, 2007 on Istiglaliyat Street. President of the Republic of Azerbaijan Ilham Aliyev attended the opening ceremony.

== Technical details ==
The monument was carved out of granite and white marble. The state emblem Azerbaijan is engraved on the white marble which constitutes the lower part of the monument. The signatures of members of the National Council and the text of Independence Declaration (adopted in Tbilisi, 1918) engraved on the Declaration of Independence monument in both old Arabic and Latin alphabets on the upper part (made of granite).
