= Shedde =

Azerbaijani lint-free carpet

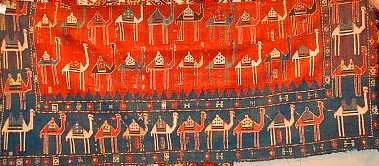
"Shedde" carpet related to the Lyanbyaran village (Barda district, Azerbaijan). Philadelphia, 2008

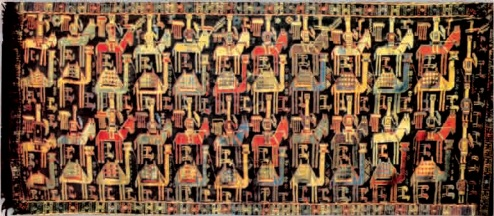
"Shedde" carpet, the 17th century

“Shedde”, (Azerbaijani: Şəddə) are Azerbaijani lint-free carpets part of the Karabakh group of the Karabakh type. These carpets were produced mainly in Nakhchivan, in Aghjabedi, Aghdam, Gubadly and Jabrayil districts of Azerbaijan.

== Artistic particularities ==
The Shedde carpets are made using a complex wrapping method. The artistic composition of these carpets as well as its constituent parts and elements have a complex shape. At the beginning of the 20th century, the oldest carpet weavers and carpet experts called this type of carpets "shadra" or "tent". The word shedde is a distorted form of shatranj or shadward. There are two types of the Shedde carpets composition.

=== First type ===
In the first type, the composition of the carpets consists of various subjects. The main plot represents caravans of camels and horses, lined up in a row. A characteristic element of the Shedde plot are the figures of the carriers and camel drivers who are in the front of the camel and the horse caravans. The riders have a hunting bird on their left hand - a falcon, and in their right hand, a rope tied to the collar of a hound dog. This is a hunting scene. All people in the middle field are depicted in full face, and the animals - in profile. In rare cases, Shedde with a plot pattern is woven by a special order. In the Jabrayil district, sometimes, such Shedde woven of silk were found.

=== Second type ===
The second type of Shedde is made up of carpets with an ornamental pattern. These patterns are formed by short distance rapports. The common element of these patterns is the image of a flying hoopoe, which is given in full face. Such compositions are also found in the Karabakh zili. Until recently, Sheddes were also produced with the middle field of which consisted of squares like chess pieces.

== See also ==
- Azerbaijani rug
- Karabakh carpet
