= Alish Lambaranski =

Soviet mayor (1914–1999)

Alish Lemberanski
- Born: May 23, 1914; Lanbaran, Barda Rayon, Caucasus Viceroyalty, Russian Empire
- Died: May 1, 1999 (aged 84); Baku, Azerbaijan
- Organization: Council of Ministers of the Azerbaijan Soviet Socialist Republic

Alish Jamil oglu Lambaranski (Azeri: Əliş Cəmil oğlu Ləmbəranski; May 23, 1914 – May 1, 1999) was a Soviet and Azerbaijani statesman and mayor of Baku.

== Biography ==
Alish Lemberanskiy was born on May 23, 1914, in Lemberan village of Barda in the family of traumatic-surgeon and orthopedist Jamil bey Lambaranski. He graduated from oil-field faculty of Azerbaijan State Oil Academy. At the age of 27 Lemberanskiy was assigned the position of director of petroleum refinery. During the Great Patriotic War he went to the war voluntarily. At the beginning of 1943, Lemberanskiy was seriously wounded in the battles of Rostov. After wounding he returned to Baku and was reinstated in the same office in petroleum refinery. He won a Stalin Prize for his work in fuel mining. After that, he led Azerbaijan's union of oil refineries, Azpetrolplants. Later in his career, Lambaranski was appointed Mayor of Baku, a public post he successfully held from 1958 to 1966. After that Alish Lambaranski held the post of the Chief Engineer/Architect of the City of Baku for many years. In 1959, Lemberanskiy was assigned a chairman of executing committee of Baku Soviet of National Deputies. On his initiative many cultural objects and residential houses were built in Baku. Tree and shrub planting was provided, new parks and squares were created Baku Boulevard was thoroughly renewed and expanded. Boulevard became an amazing seaside park with flowering decorative bushes and orchards. There was built the café “Pearl”, was established its own “Venice”, where children floated with adults in “gondolas”.

In 1964, he was assigned to an important work-deputy chief of the Head Office of microbiological industry in Moscow.

Back in the 1960s, one of the most persistent problems in Baku was a lack of housing.

In 1969, Heydar Aliyev became the governor of the Republic and offered Lemberanskiy the guidance of construction in the Republic. In order to change the situation and to solve housing problems, Lambaranski assembled a strong, professional team of city leaders and soon developed a plan to solve the housing problem. His plan was to create "micro-regions" with public utilities and playgrounds. He also widened Baku's crowded streets, and replaced the noisy, old trams with trolleys and motorized buses. Older, single-storied buildings were torn down to make room for new construction.

The list of building projects that he carried out includes the Republic Palace, Gulustan Palace, the renovation of the Opera and Ballet Theater when it burned down, Azerbaijan State Theatre of Young Spectators, the Baku Plant of Consumer Conditioners and the Plant of Deep Water Sea Foundations, State Circus, building of Baku International Sea Trade Port, “Gulustan” palace, Musical Comedy Theatre, Green Theatre, Baku Funicular, and “Moscow”, “Azerbaijan”, “Absheron” hotels, not to mention several large residential districts. New cinemas, schools, kindergartens and cafes appeared in Baku as well.

In 1970, Alish Lemberanskiy became the vice-chairman for construction of the Council of Ministers of the Azerbaijan SSR. He led the construction of important objects for the Republic, including the construction of Factory of Domestic Conditioners in Baku when he held this position.

Lambaranski traveled extensively, and once while abroad, he noticed beautiful, colorful benches placed under trees. He knew that the people of Baku liked to stop and chat whenever they met, so he began producing benches to give the people a place to rest while they talked. The benches became so popular that the famous Azerbaijani composer Tofig Guliyev, a good friend of his, composed a lively tune called "The Benches of Baku." Known for his efforts, Lambaranski soon became popular among the people of Baku. They respectfully and affectionately called him "our mayor" instead of the usual title, "Chairman of the City Executive."
