= Jamil bey Lambaranski =

Azerbaijani public figure and statesman

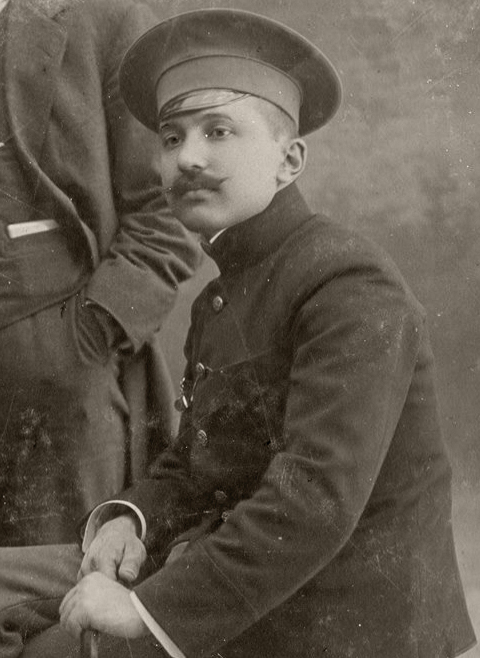
- Born: Jamil bey Meshedi Nasir oglu Lambaranski; 1884; Lambaran, Shusha Uyezd, Elizavetpol Governorate, Russian Empire
- Died: 1959 (aged 74–75); Baku, Azerbaijani SSR
- Occupations: Statesman, politician and doctor

Jamil bey Lambaranski (Azerbaijani: Cəmil Məşədi Nasir oğlu Lənbəranski; b. 1884, Lambaran, Shusha Uyezd, Elizavetpol Governorate, Russian Empire - d. 1959, Baku, Azerbaijani SSR) was an Azerbaijani public figure and statesman, a member of the parliament of the Azerbaijan Democratic Republic (1918-1920). He was Alish Lambaranski's father.

== Life ==
Jamil bey Meshedi Nasir oglu Lambaranski was born in 1884 in the village of Lambaran, Shusha district. In 1913, Jamil bey graduated from the medical faculty of Kyiv University. Until 1920, he worked in the Terter hospital, which he himself created. In 1918 he was a participant in the Batumi Conference. On November 20, 1918, the National Council of Azerbaijan adopted the Law on the Formation of the Azerbaijani Parliament. In accordance with the adopted law, Jamil bey Lambaranski was included in the Parliament of the ADR, was a member of the Ittihad faction.

After the Red Army invasion of Azerbaijan, Jamil bey served as head of the medical department of the People's Commissariat of Health of Azerbaijan, head physician of the 1st surgical hospital, head of traumatology departments in oil fields (Sabunchi, Black City), during the Great Patriotic War - chief surgeon of the garrison hospital and adviser to the evacuation hospitals of the commissariat healthcare. In 1949, Jamil beyLambaranski defended his Ph.D. thesis, headed the Department of Orthopedics and Traumatology of the Azerbaijan Institute for the Improvement of Doctors. In 1957, Jamil bey Lambaranski was awarded the honorary title of Honored Doctor of the Azerbaijan SSR.

Jamil bey Lambaranski died in 1959 in Baku.

== Sources ==
- Çingizoğlu, Ənvər (2009). Ləmbəranskilər. Baku: Soy.
- Азербайджанская Демократическая Республика (1918―1920). Законодательные акты. (Сборник документов). Baku. 1998.
