= Baku Funicular =

Cable railway in Baku, Azerbaijan

- Bakı funikulyoru
- New building of the Baku Funicular
- Interactive map of Baku Funicular
- Location: Baku, Azerbaijan
- Coordinates: 40.3584°N 49.8285°E
- Completion date: 1960
- Opening date: May 5, 1960
- Website: https://funicular.az/

Baku Funicular (Azerbaijani: Bakı funikulyoru) is a funicular system in Baku, Azerbaijan. It connects a square on Neftchilar Avenue and Martyrs' Lane. It is the first and remains the only funicular system in the country.

== Technical characteristics ==
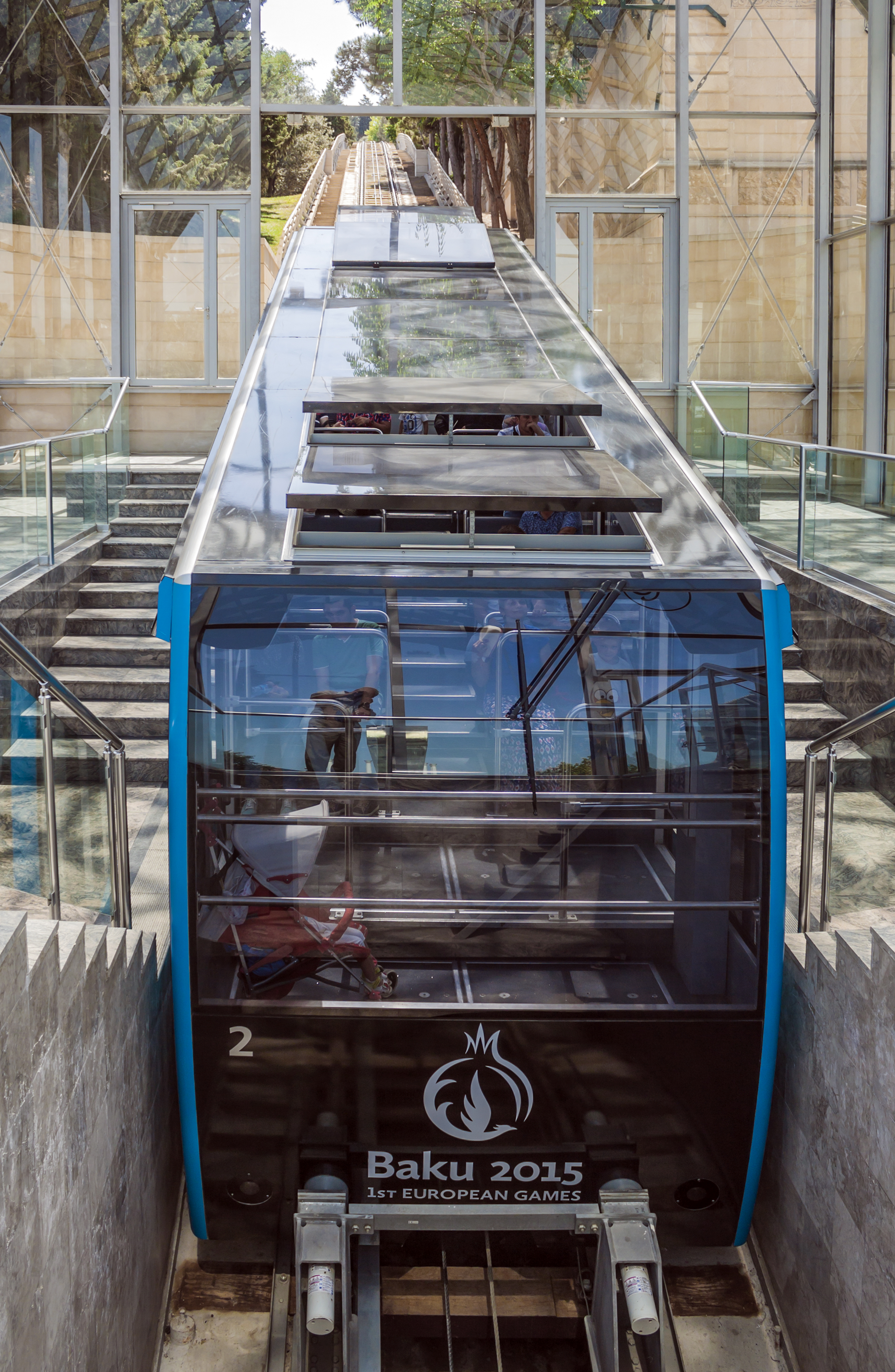
A funicular with 2015 European Games branding

- Length of railway track is 455 meters (1,493 ft)
- It consists of a single-track part and a passing place.
- There are two stations; electric and rope drive.
- Two coaches – BF-1 and BF-2 are exploited.
- Its transportation capacity is approximately 1500 per day.
- Maximal speed is 2.5 m/s (8.2 ft/s).
- Interval between departures of coaches is 15 minutes.
- Time of train service between stations is 3 minutes.
- Working time is from Tuesday to Sunday, 10:00 to 13:00 and 14:00 to 20:00. Funicular is closed on Mondays.
- Capacity of a coach is 28 people.

== History ==
Baku Funicular station in 2010 before 2011 renovation

The funicular was constructed at the initiative of Alish Lambaranski. It was opened in 1960. Tofig Ismayilov has been the director of the funicular since 2006. The funicular has 11 Personnel. In Soviet times, it used coaches made in Kharkiv.

== Modern funicular ==
Baku Funicular has been repaired several times. It was closed in late 1980s and reopened in 2001. Baku Funicular was capitally repaired in 2001 and 2007. In April 2011, it was again closed for a complete overhaul, and reopened on May 23, 2012. Architect: europroject, Vienna/Austria (Architects A.Mueller/W.Hoffelner/H.Peter). Constructor: GIG projects, Austria

The funicular has two stations:“Bahram Gur” and “Martyrs' Lane".
