= Istiglaliyyat Street =

Street in Baku, Azerbaijan

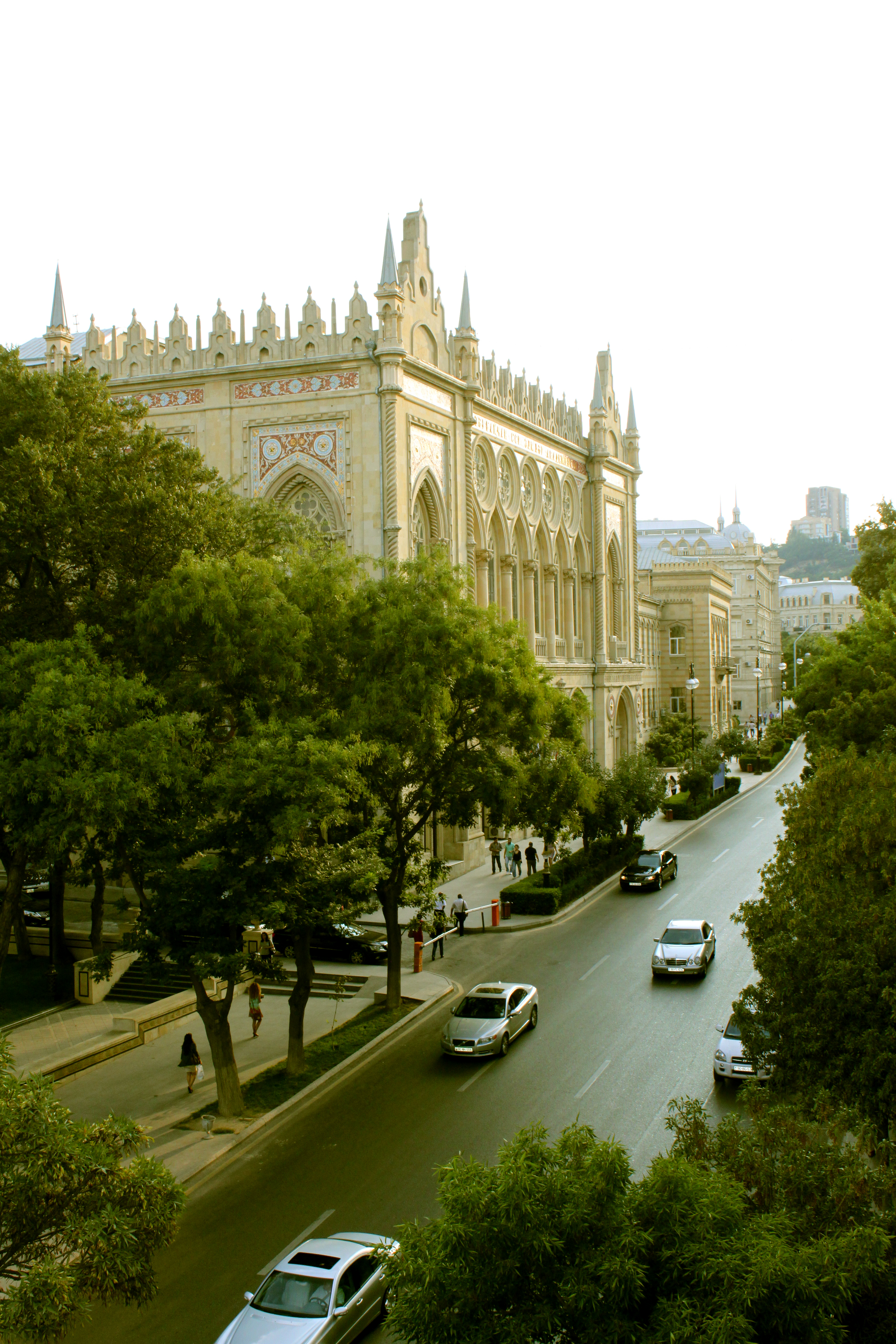
- Interactive map of Istiglaliyyat Street
- Maintained by: City of Baku
- Length: 2.2 km (1.4 mi)
- Location: Sabail raion
- Coordinates: 40.3682°N 49.8323°E
- South end: Gulustan Palace
- Northeast end: Aziz Aliyev Street

Istiglaliyyat Street (Azerbaijani: İstiqlaliyyət küçəsi) is an arterial road in the central uptown part of Baku, Azerbaijan. It begins at Gulustan Palace, located on the southern hillside part of Baku, and continues north, then northeast, terminating at the intersection of Aziz Aliyev and Mammad Amin Rasulzade Streets at the edge of Fountains Square.

== Overview of the street ==
Istiglaliyyat is one of the oldest streets of Baku. The former names of the street were "Nikolayevskaya", honoring the Russian tsar Nikolay I during Russian imperial rule, "Parlamentskaya" after the revolution, and "Kommunisticheskaya" during Soviet rule. After the restoration of Azerbaijan's independence in 1991, the street was renamed to "Istiglaliyyat", which means "Sovereignty" in Azerbaijani. It stretches for 2.2 kilometres (1.4 mi). Due to its location in the historic district, it is considered one of the most beautiful parts of Baku. There are many government offices, universities, shops, boutiques, and restaurants on the street.

== Notable buildings and monuments located on Istiglaliyyat Street ==
- Gulustan Palace
- United Nations Representative Office in Azerbaijan
- Presidential Palace, office of the President of Azerbaijan
- Azerbaijan State Philharmonic Hall
- Western University
- Mayoralty of Baku
- Azerbaijan State Economic University
- Azerbaijan National Academy of Sciences
- Icheri Sheher Metro Station
- Ichari Shahar northern wall
- Mirza Alakbar Sabir garden
- Monument to Nizami Ganjavi
- Nizami Museum of Azerbaijan Literature

== Picture gallery ==
Nikolayevskaya

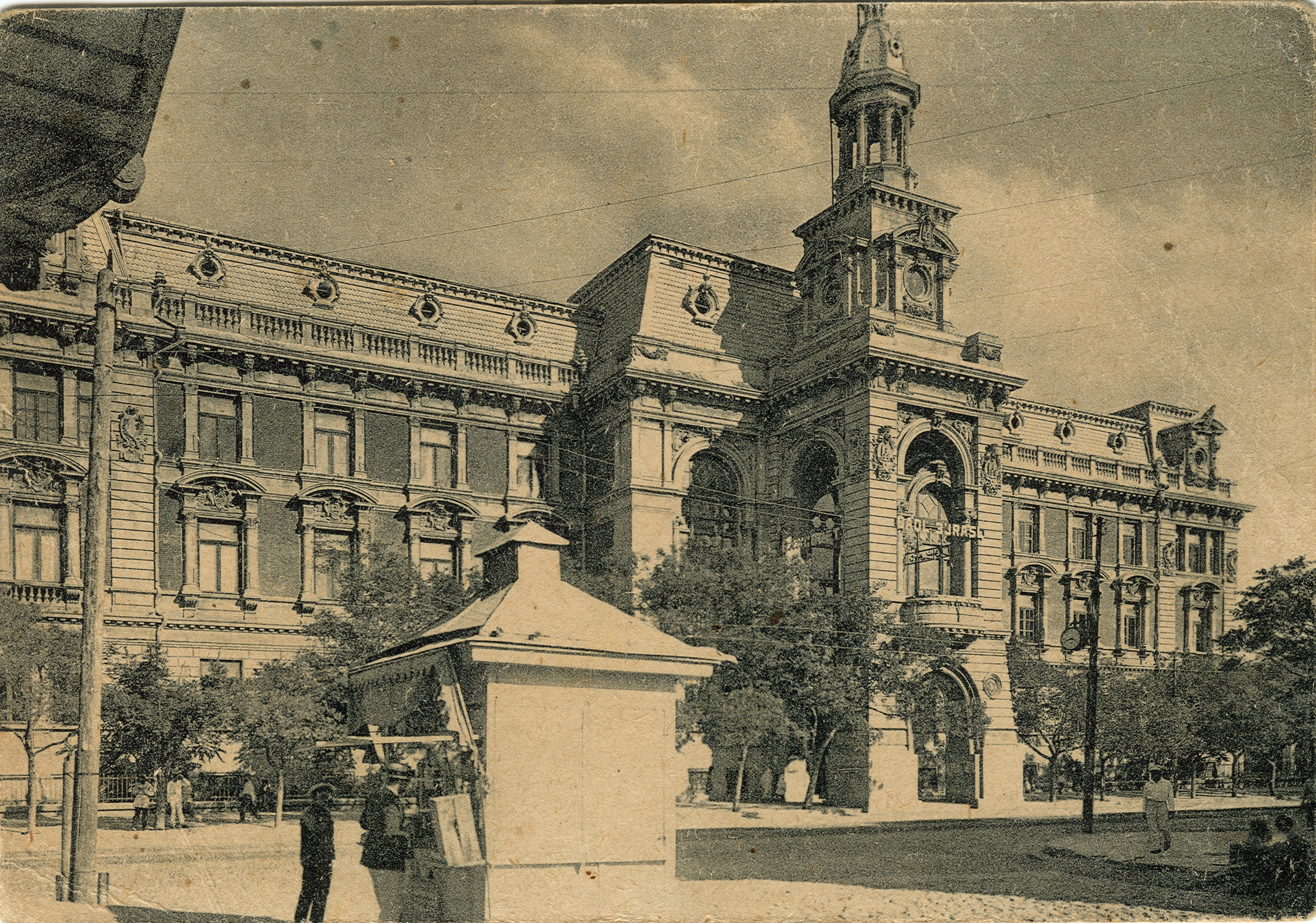
Building of Baku City Duma

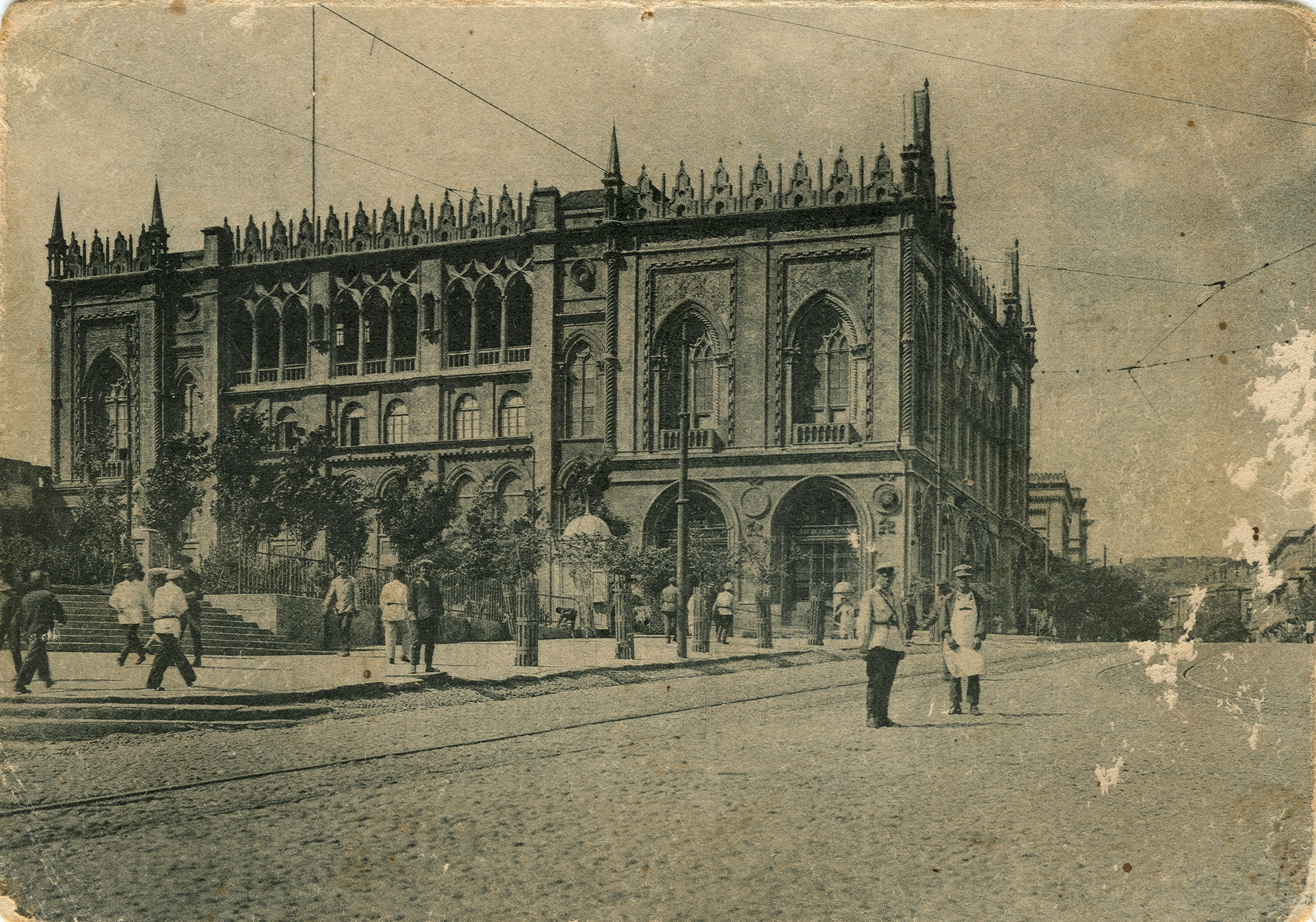
Ismailiyya building (now Azerbaijan National Academy of Sciences)

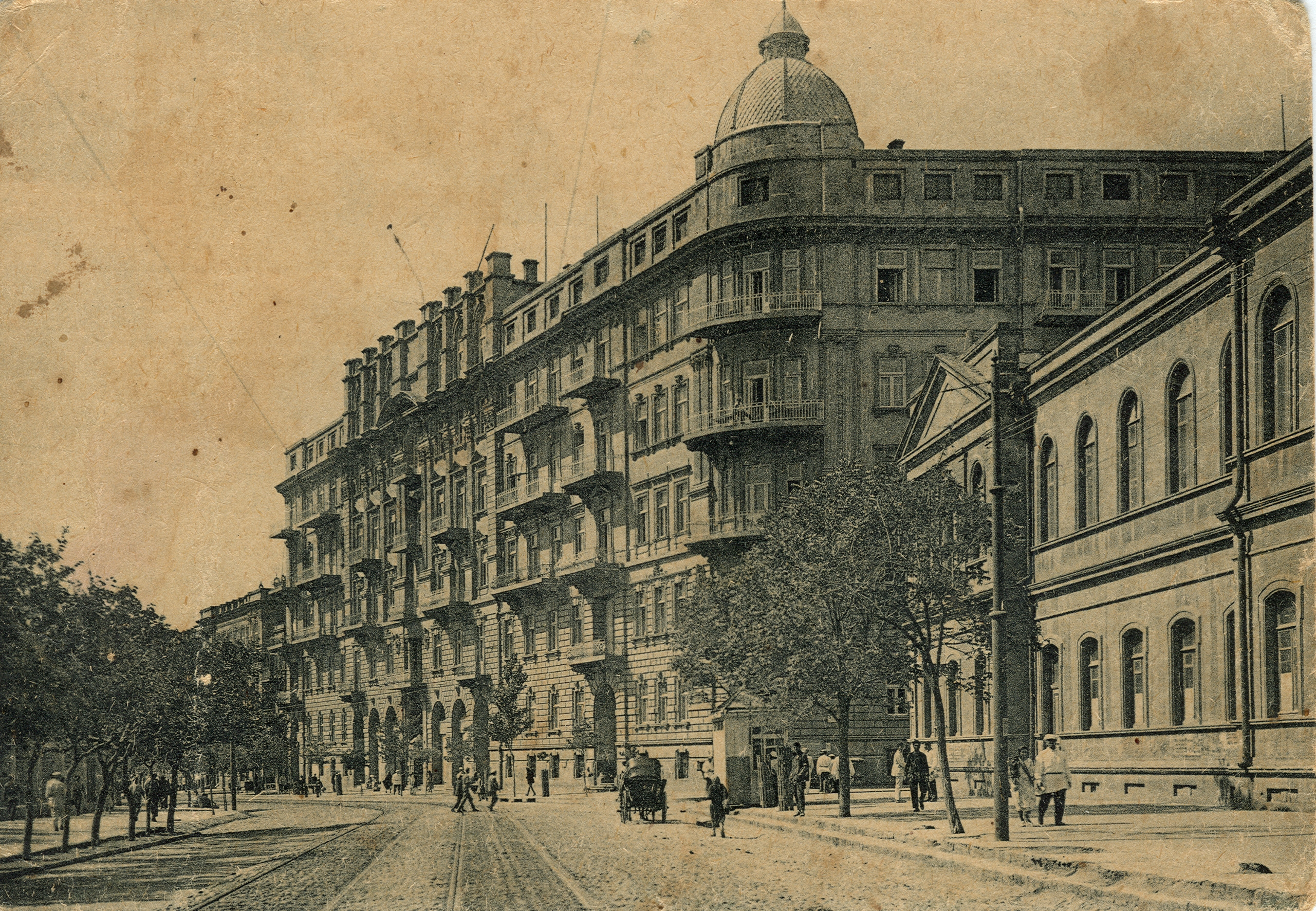
House of Mirzabekian brothers on Istiglaliyyat

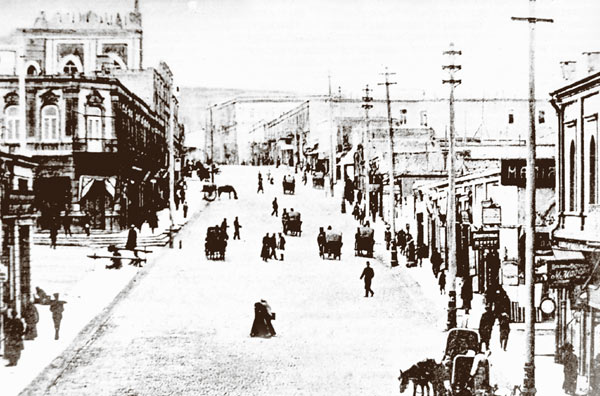
Nikolayevskaya during the day

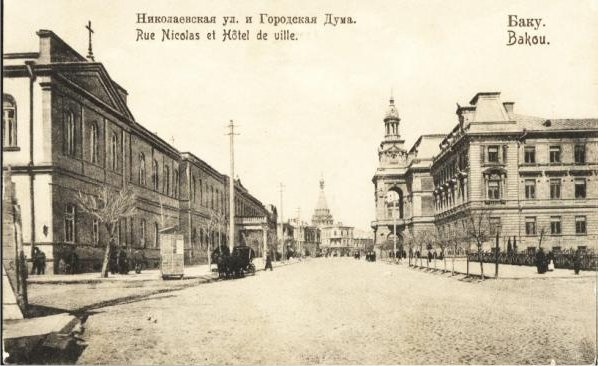
City Duma (Alexander Nevsky Cathedral in the background)

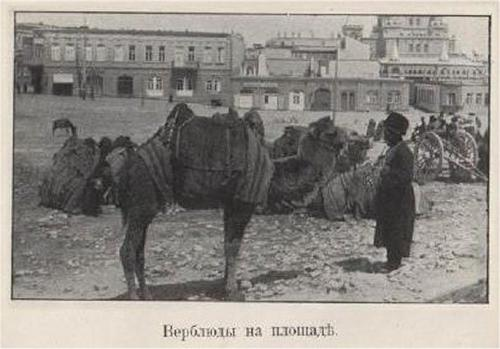
Camels on Nikolayevskaya

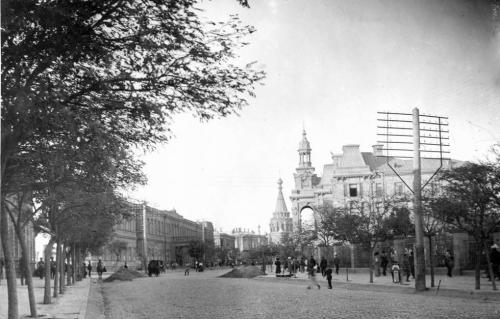
Nikolayevskaya before the revolution

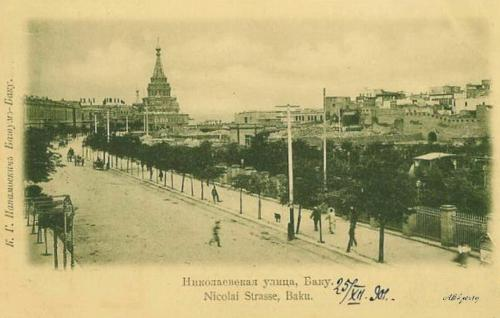
Nikolayevskaya
Kommunisticheskaya

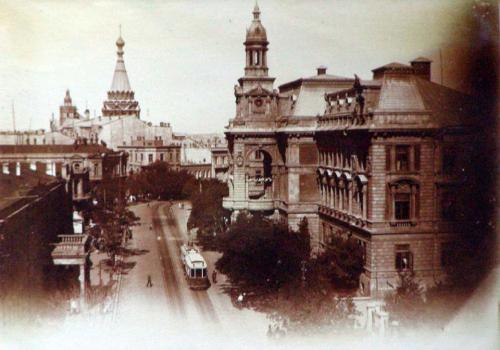
Kommunisticheskaya Street in 1930

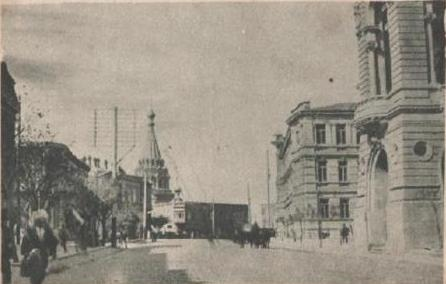
Publishing house

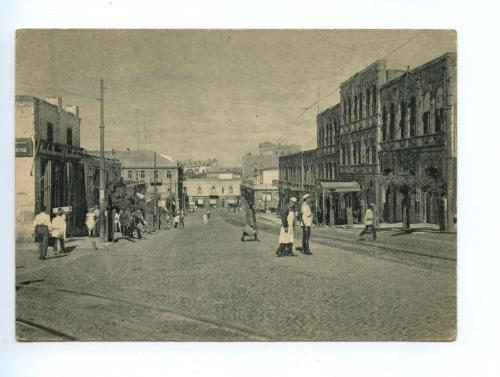
Kommunisticheskaya

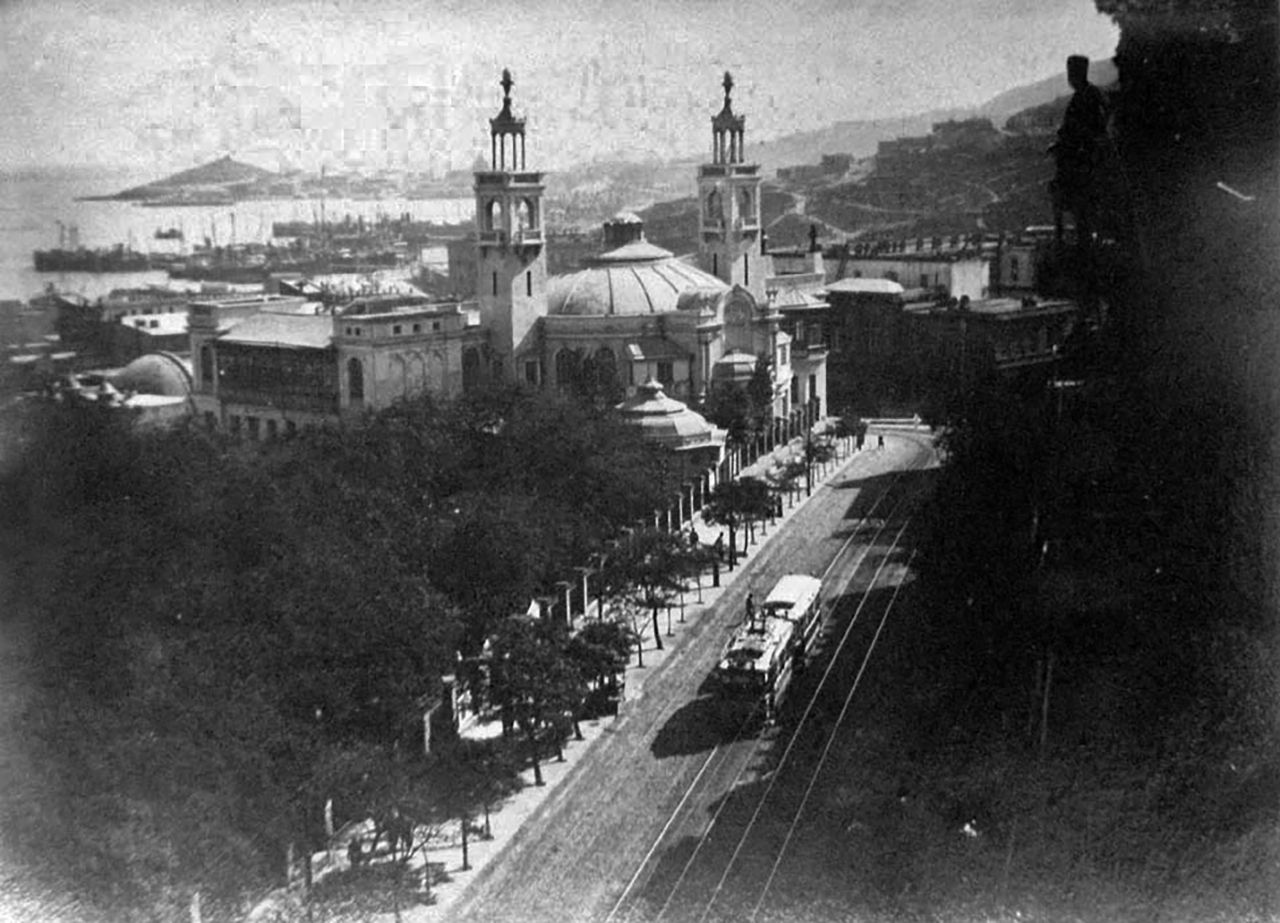
View of Philharmonic Hall

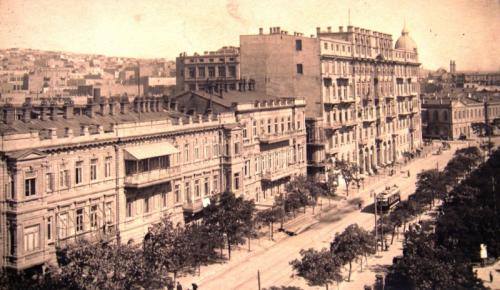
Close to the Governor's Park
Istiglaliyyat Street

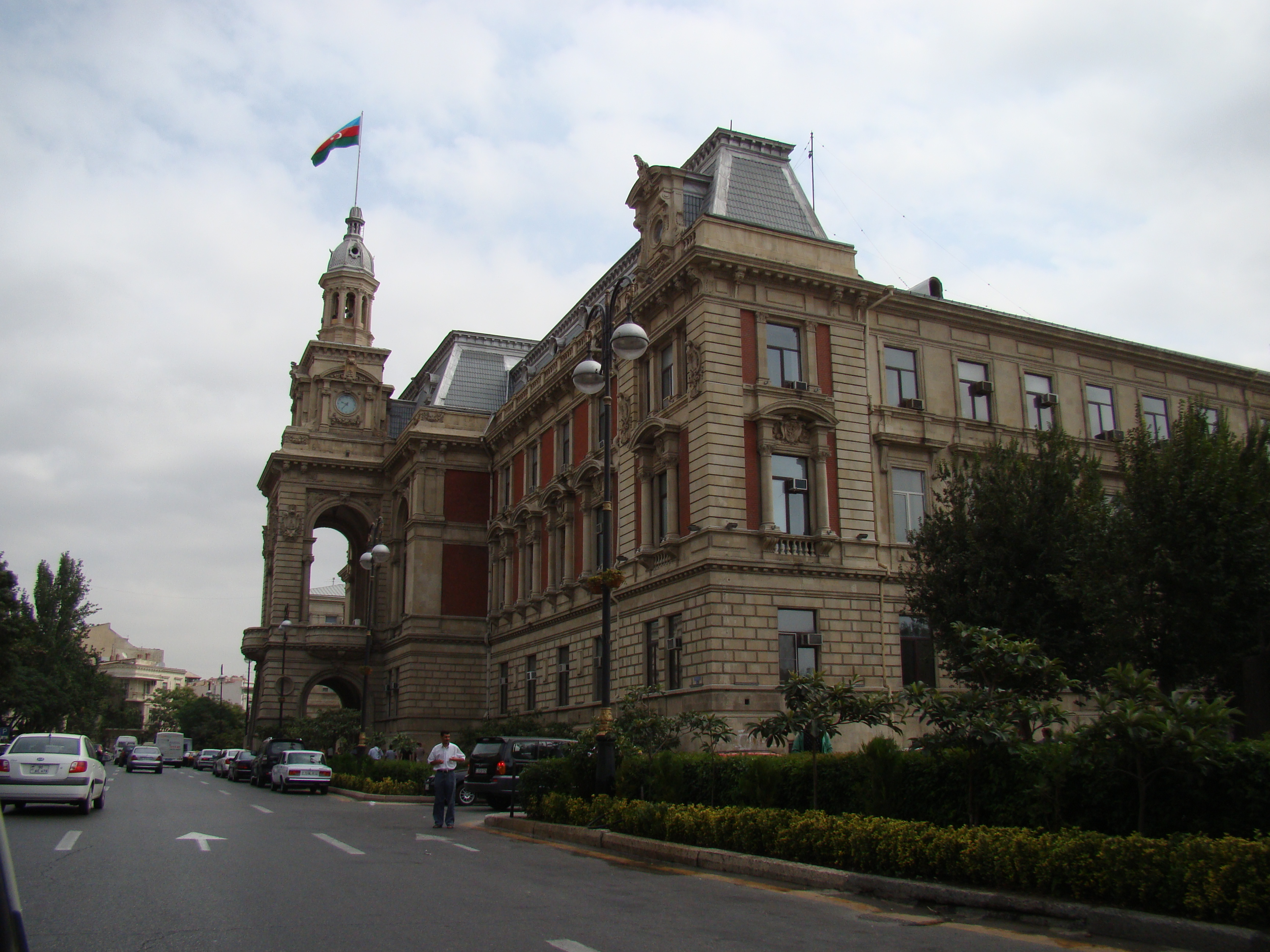
Mayoralty of Baku

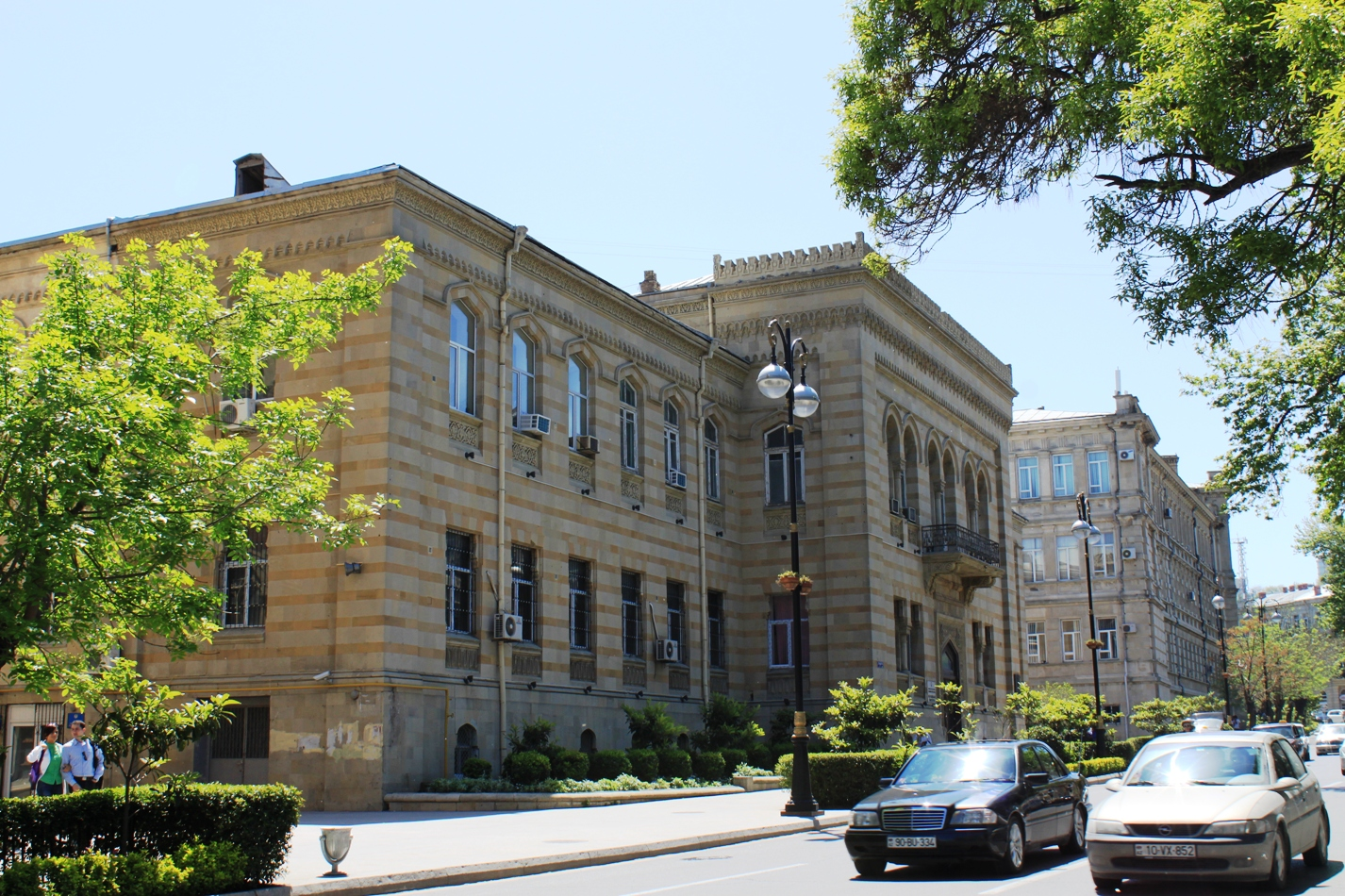
Institute of Manuscripts

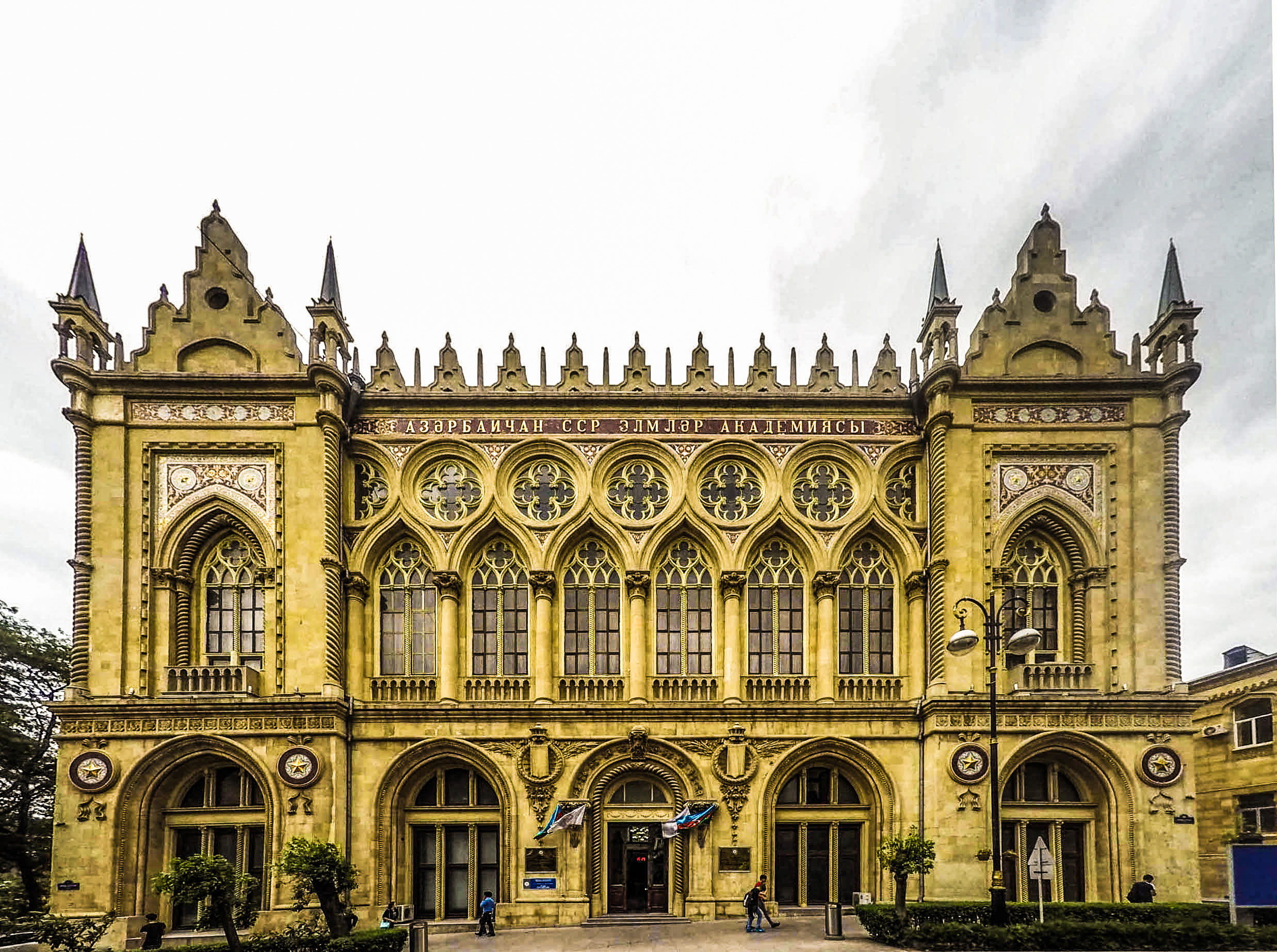
Building of Azerbaijan National Academy of Sciences

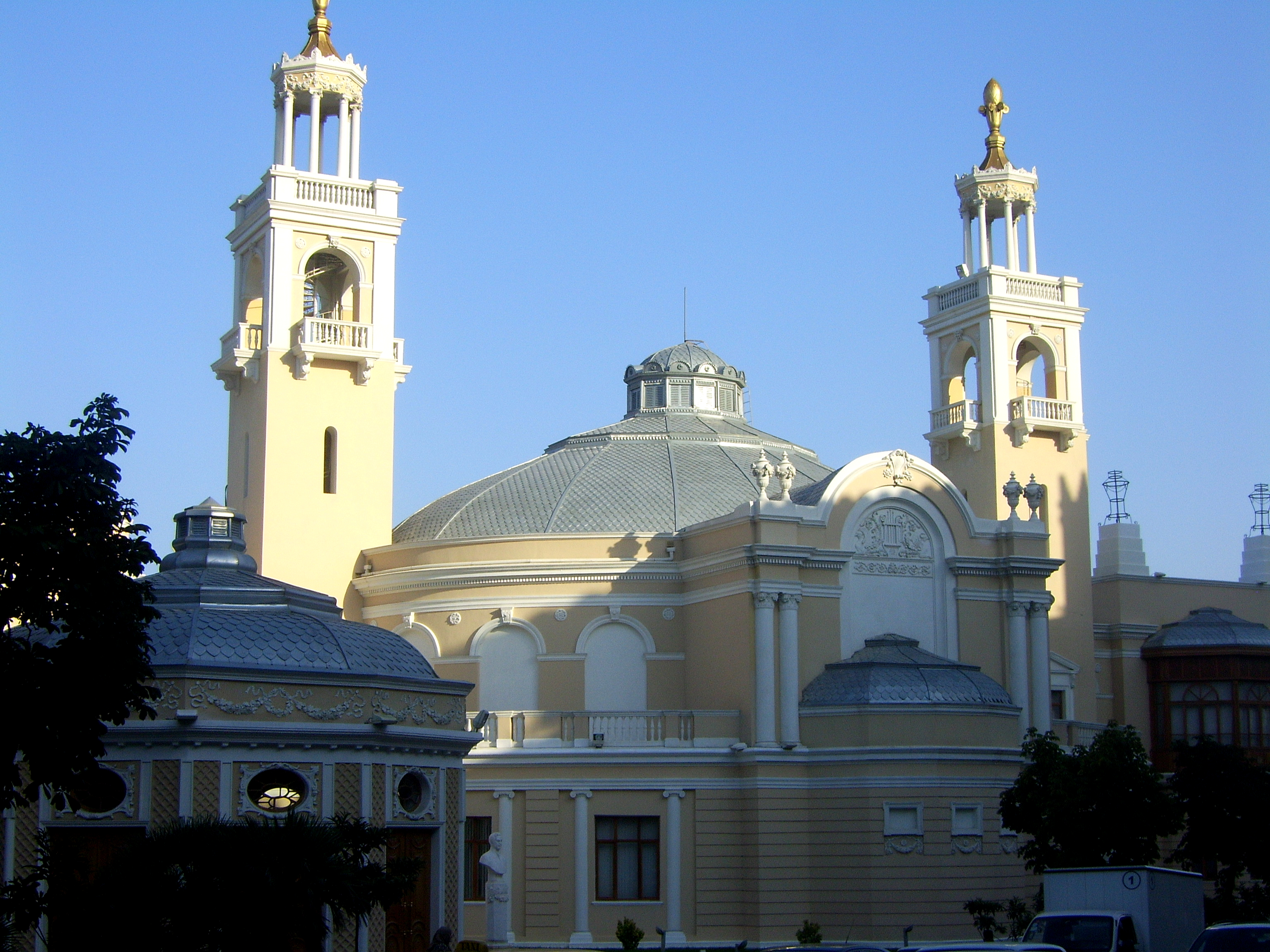
Azerbaijan State Philharmonic Hall

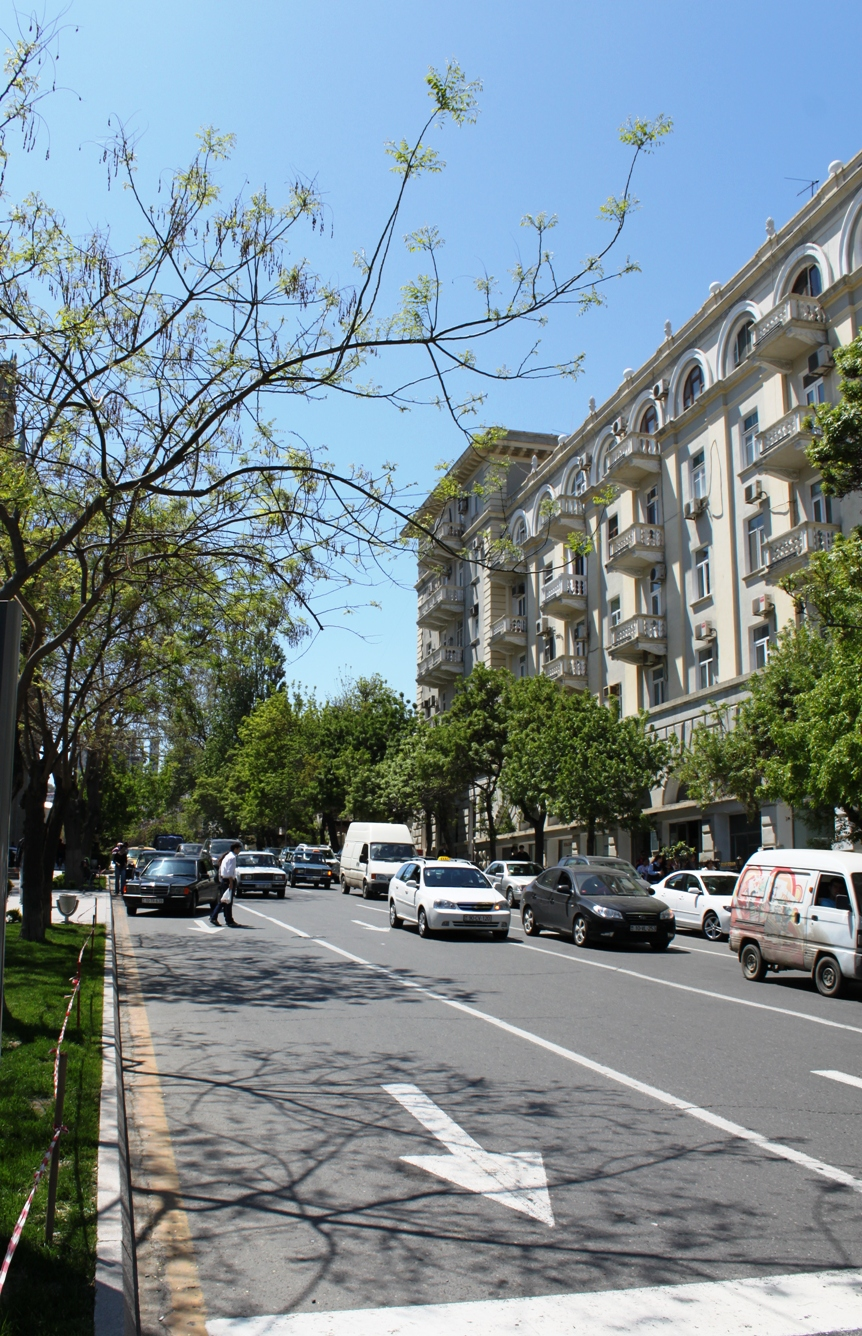
Oncoming traffic at intersection with Husu Hajiyev Street

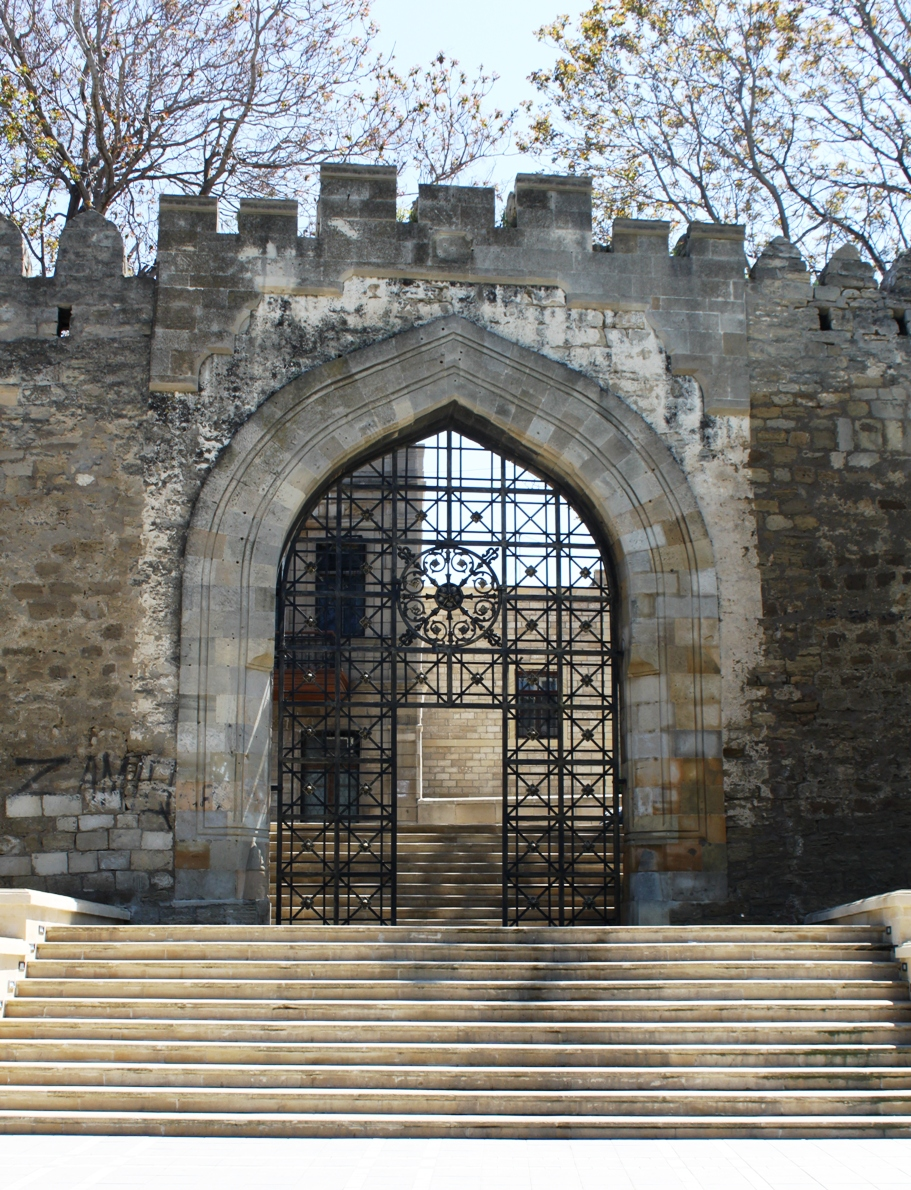
One of the Icheri Sheher gates

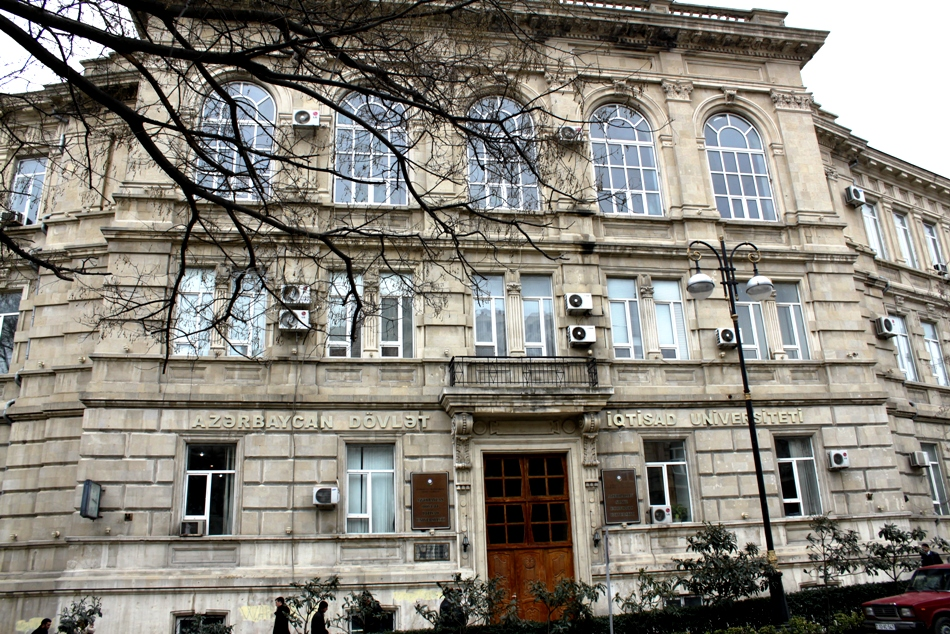
Azerbaijan State Economic University

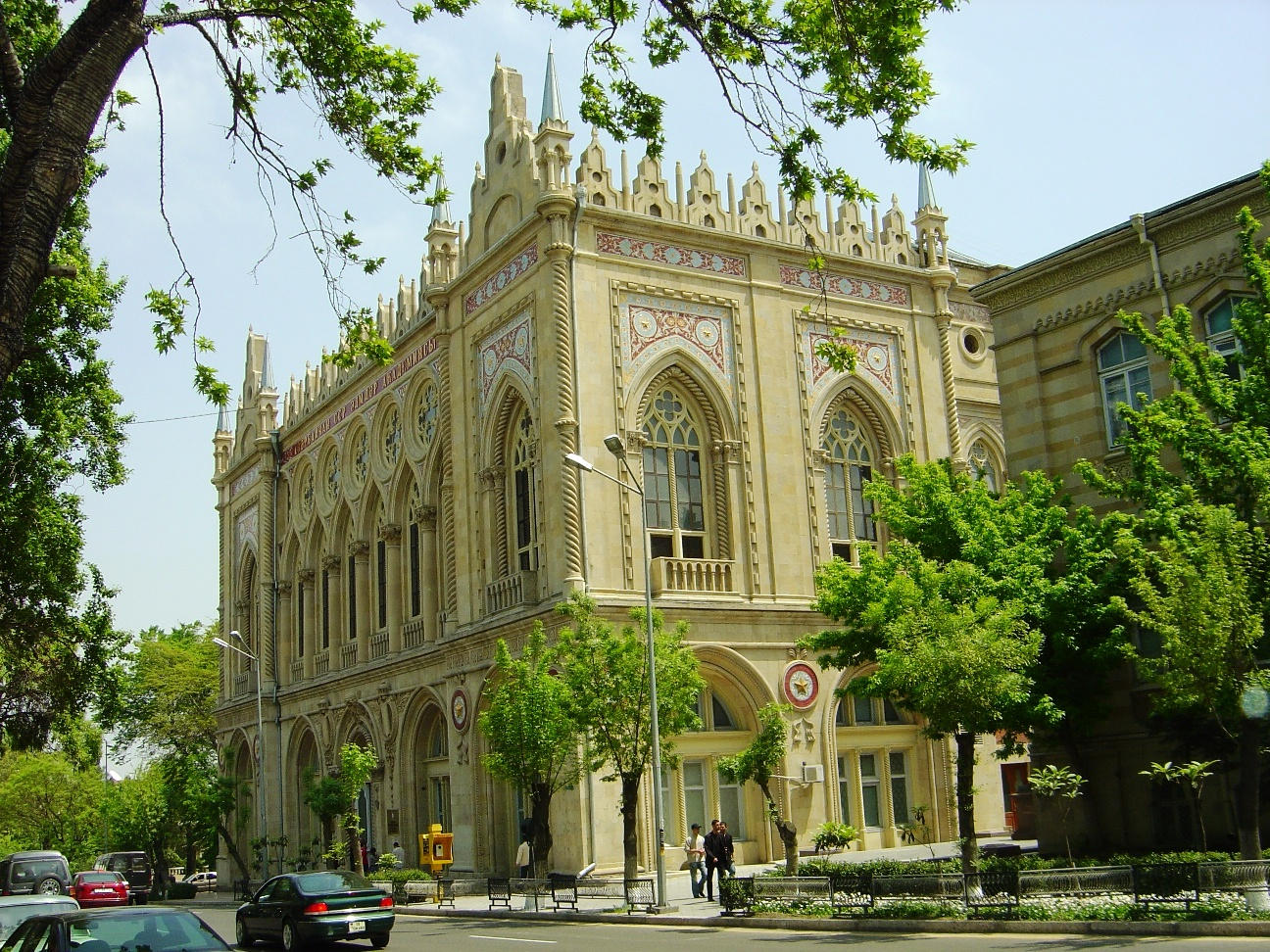
Former Ismailiya

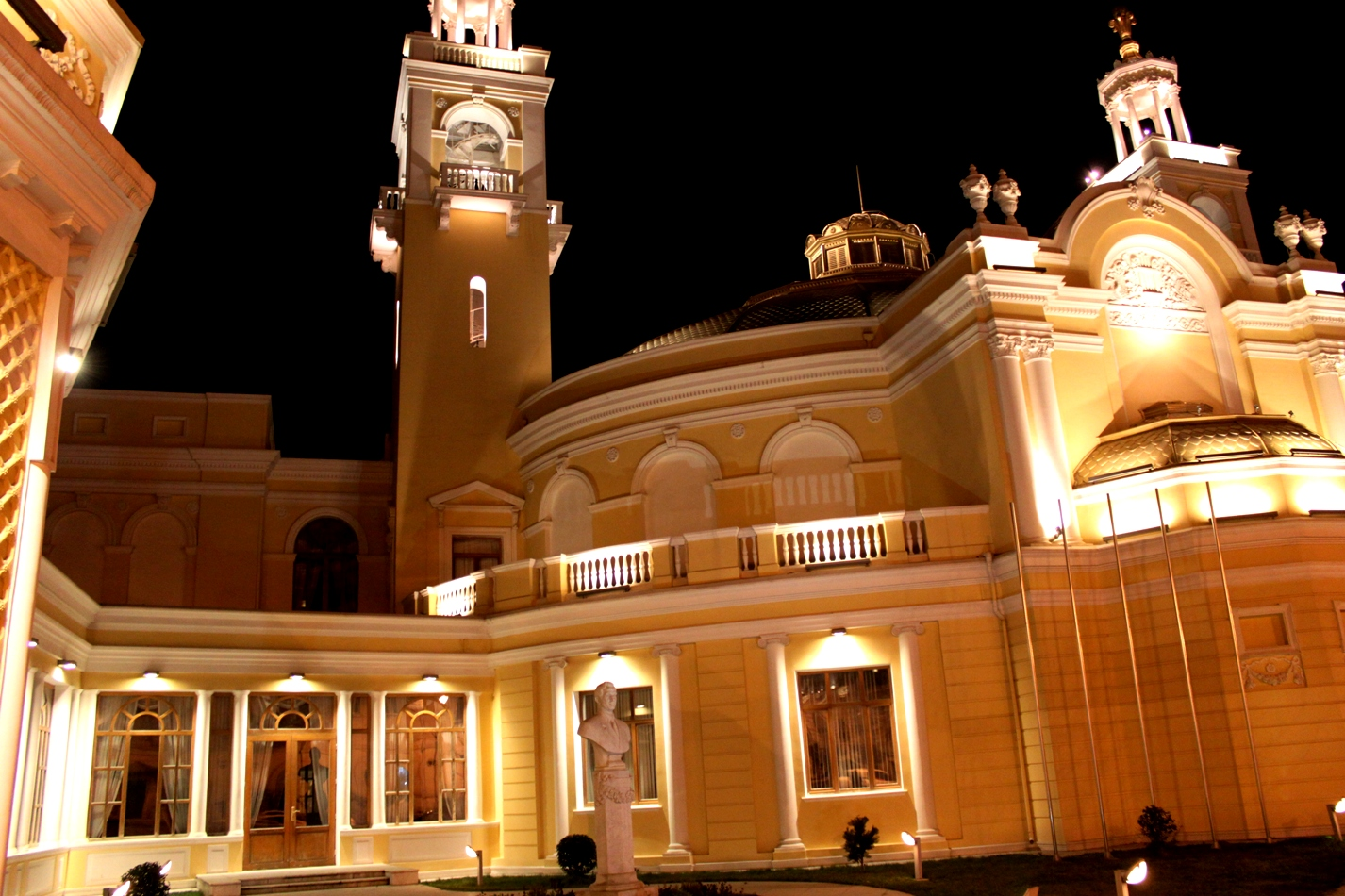
Azerbaijan State Philharmonic Hall

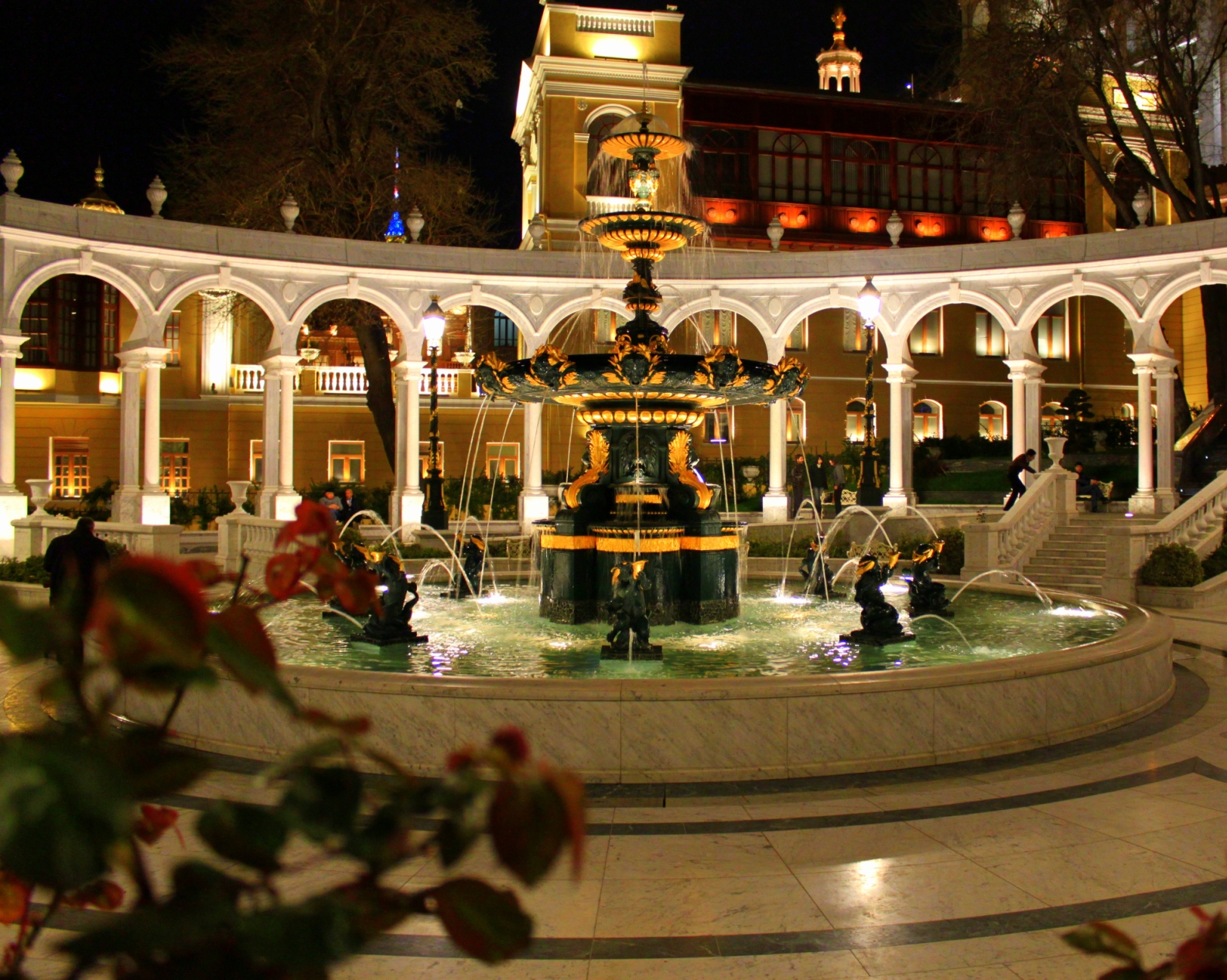
Philharmonic garden

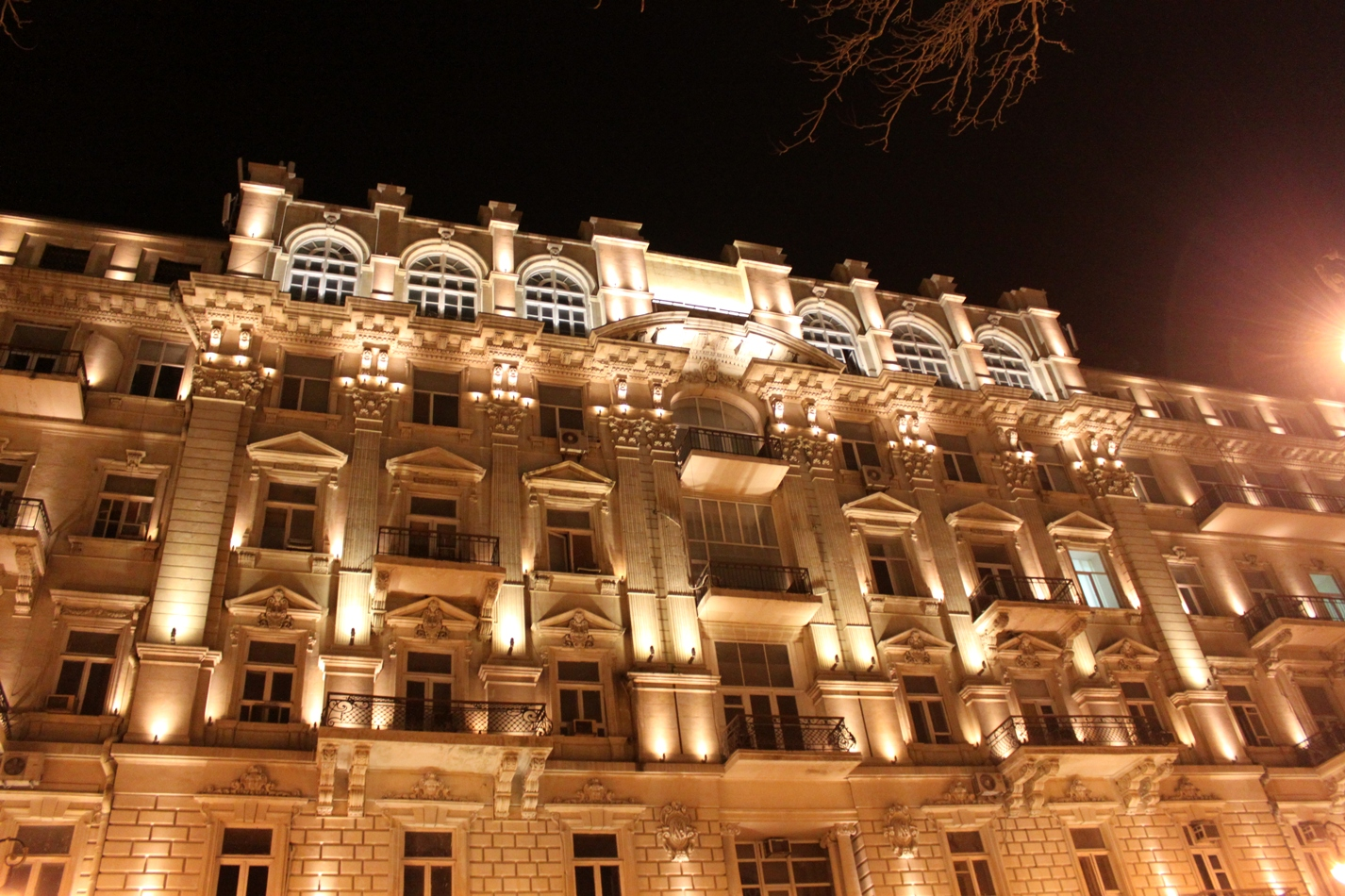
House of Mirzabekian brothers

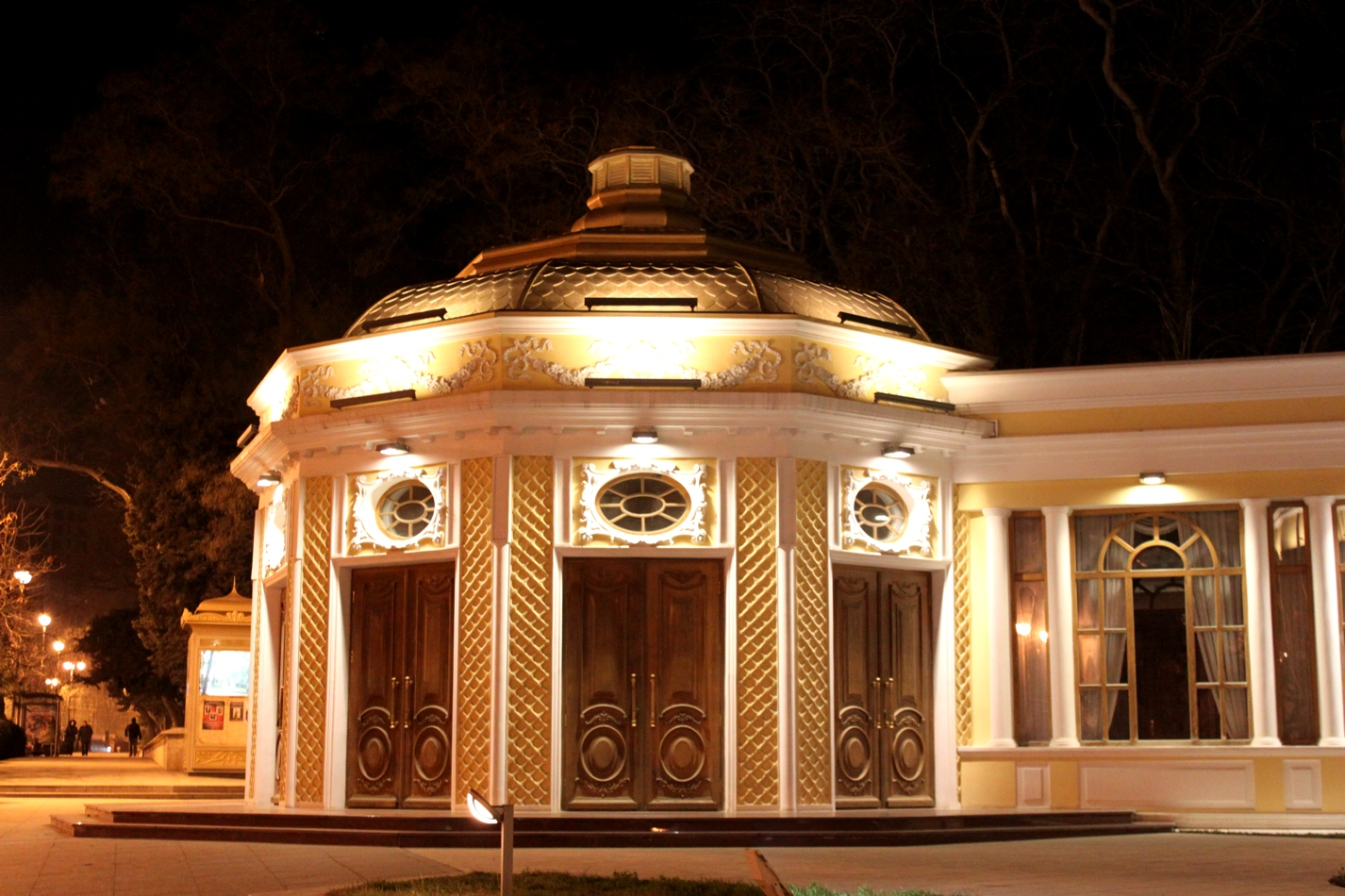
Philharmonic Hall at night

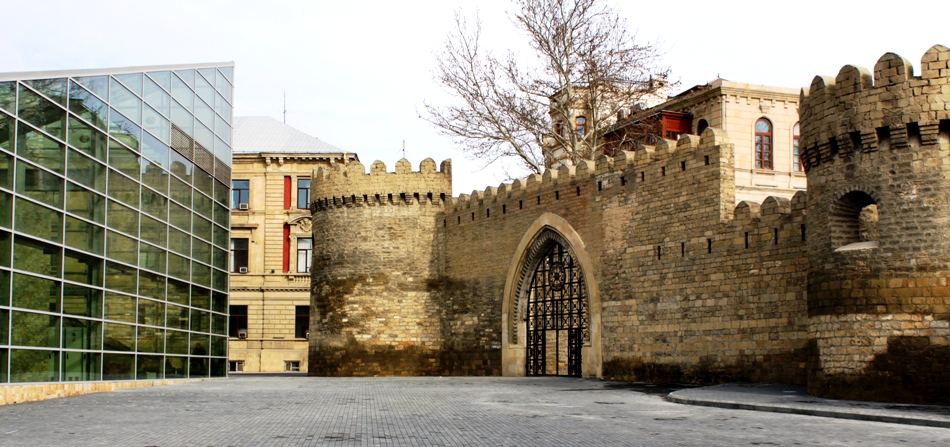
Northeastern end of Istiglaliyyat Street
