= Heydar Aliyev Palace =

Concert hall in Baku

- Heydər Əliyev Adına Saray
- Baku Palace
- Interactive map of Heydar Aliyev Palace
- Former names: Republic Palace (1991–2004); Lenin Palace (1972–1991)
- Location: Baku, Azerbaijan
- Coordinates: 40°22′39″N 49°50′29″E
- Capacity: 2,500

Construction
- Opened: 14 December 1972
- Renovated: 2007–2008
- Architect: Alish Lemberanskiy

Website
- www.ha-saray.az

Heydar Aliyev Palace (Azeri: Heydər Əliyev Adına Saray, also known as Baku Palace, formerly Republic Palace (Respublika Sarayı) and during the Soviet era known as Lenin Palace (Лeнин aдынa) is the main music venue of Baku, Azerbaijan, seating 2,500 people. The palace was renamed after the death of Azerbaijani President Heydar Aliyev in 2003. Alish Lemberanskiy was the designer and main visioner of the palace.

It is a concert complex where state events are held alongside cultural programs. The concert hall of the palace is considered to be the biggest scene in the republic.

== History ==
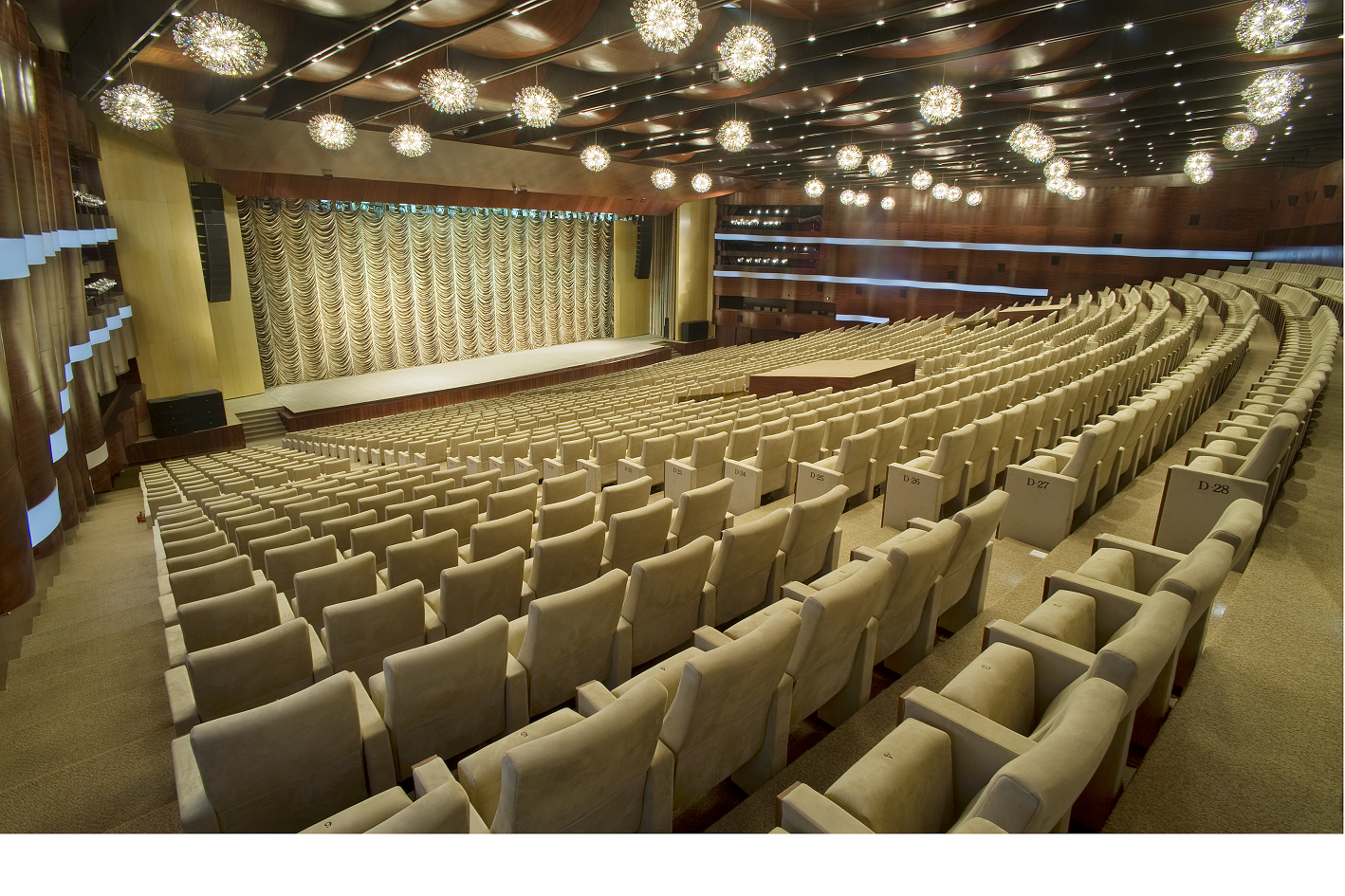
Interior of the main hall

The palace operates as "Palace named after VI Lenin" from December 14, 1972. In 1991, it was renamed to "Republic Palace". According to the decree of the Azerbaijani Ilham Aliyev dated March 10, 2004, the palace was renamed to "Heydar Aliyev Palace".

In 2007-2008, the palace was fundamentally repaired - equipped with new equipment, changes were made in appearance. The palace has been put into operation on October 16. On October 24, 2008, the inauguration ceremony of President Ilham Aliyev was held in the palace. Officially, the fully renovated palace was opened on November 5–6, 2008 in the USSR with the concert of People's Artist Zeynab Khanlarova.

== Architecture ==
Heydar Aliyev Palace, 2017

The Palace of the H.Aliyev, the Central Concert Hall of the Republic, has different features than other theater and concert halls. Palace is a large-format concert hall that has hosted many of Azerbaijan’s big events over the past 40 years. There are some 30 stepped rows of theatre-style seats for over 2,150 spectators.

Appearance and interior designs, scenery, marble floors and audacious vaulted stairways, the coffee-and-cream foyer, a discreet but extensive cloak room facility, non-analogous sound in Azerbaijan, light, movie projection and laser systems, as well as ordered and installed LED screens are its unique peculiarity. And it's the only place that lets its guests use free and high-quality Wi-Fi, which covers a 3000-square meter area. In addition, special equipment for online transfer of concerts held in the hall is also in-place.

The Palace is located 700m directly west of the historic train station buildings and 28 Shopping Mall, and just five minutes’ drive from many of the city’s top hotels.

== Transportation ==
=== Metro ===
The B5 Metro Station is planned in this area by Baku Metro in the future.

=== Tram ===
In February 2012, the government of Azerbaijan announced that it is planning to restore the tram line in Baku. A new line had to be laid along the seaside promenade of Baku Boulevard in central Baku as part of the Baku White City development project. Since then, Formula One made Alstom change the plans and the route of this tram line, which is never happened and project was not implemented yet

== See also ==
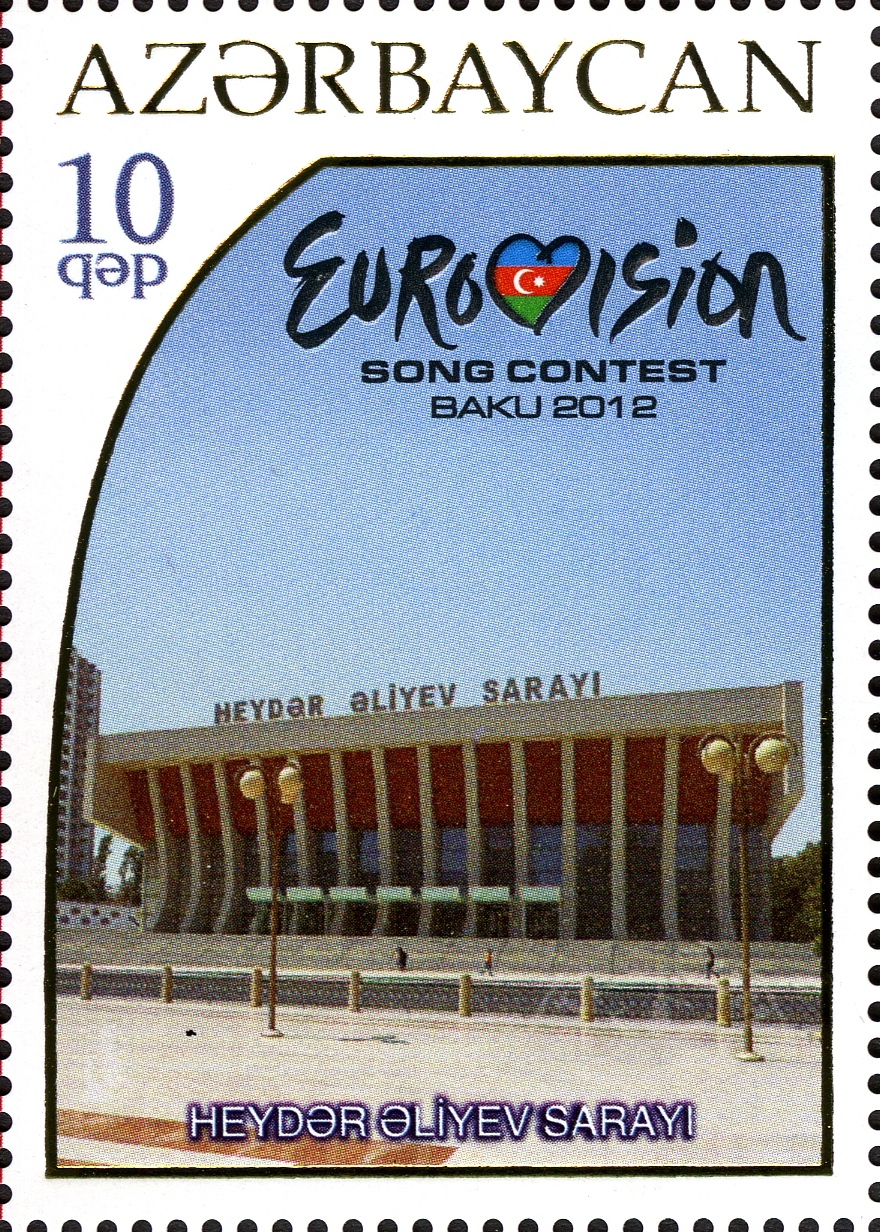
Azerbaijani stamp featuring the Heydar Aliyev Palace

- Baku Crystal Hall
