= Lənbəran =

- Municipality
- Location within Azerbaijan Location within Karabakh Economic Region
- Coordinates: 40°13′26″N 47°19′02″E
- Country: Azerbaijan
- Rayon: Barda

Population
  - Total: 4,666
- Time zone: UTC+4 (AZT)
  - Summer (DST): UTC+5 (AZT)

Lənbəran (also, Lambaran, and Lemberan) is the most populous village and municipality in the Barda Rayon of Azerbaijan other than Barda itself. It has a population of 4,666.
