= Mirdamat Baghiyev =

- Mirdamət Bağıyev
- Born: November 15, 1986 (age 39); Poladli, Shamakhi District
- Military career
- Allegiance: Azerbaijan
- Branch: Azerbaijani Land Forces
- Rank: Major
- Conflicts: April clashes; Second Karabakh War; Battle of Madagiz
- Awards: Hero of the Patriotic War; Jubilee medal "100 years of Heydar Aliyev (1923–2023)"

Mirdamat Saristan oglu Baghiyev (Mirdamət Səristan oğlu Bağıyev; born November 15, 1986, Shamakhi District) is a major in the Azerbaijani Armed Forces, a participant of the April battles and the Second Karabakh War, and a Hero of the Patriotic War.

== Biography ==
Mirdamat Baghiyev was born on November 15, 1986, in Poladli village, Shamakhi District.

In 1992, he enrolled in the first grade of Poladli Full Secondary School named after M. Karimov and graduated in 2003. That same year, he was admitted to the Azerbaijan Higher Military Academy named after Heydar Aliyev. In 2007, he completed his higher military education in the "ground artillery" specialization. From 2007 to 2009, he continued his training as a trainee at the Training and Education Center of the Armed Forces.

Mirdamat Baghiyev is married and has two children.

== Military service ==
He began his military service in 2009 at the N military unit of the Azerbaijani Armed Forces in the Tartar district.

=== April clashes ===
From the night of April 1 to 2, 2016, intense battles broke out between the Azerbaijani and Armenian Armed Forces in the Tartar and Jabrayil-Fuzuli directions. During these military operations, known as the April clashes, Mirdamat Baghiyev fought in the Tartar district. In the night battles, strategic positions, including the Talish Heights near Talish village, were liberated by the Azerbaijani Army.

Following the combat order, Baghiyev and his unit advanced towards Armenian positions near the Injachay River, following the tanks. As they moved past the defense lines, they came under fire from both flanks. To silence the enemy positions, Baghiyev returned fire with his assault rifle. While turning around during the battle, he was shot in the left arm. The 5.45×39 mm low-impulse bullet entered his arm and exited through his back. Despite falling to the ground, Baghiyev quickly got up to prevent his soldiers from losing morale and continued fighting without revealing his injury. However, as the pain and bleeding worsened, he asked a fellow soldier for a cloth to slow the bleeding. He only received medical aid after reaching a secured position. Once positioned at a strategic point, Baghiyev successfully fired a Spike anti-tank guided missile. First, he identified an Armenian command vehicle and waited until it was full of officers before launching an accurate strike that completely destroyed the vehicle. Shortly after, he noticed another vehicle gathering retreating enemy troops. After confirming that 25 soldiers had boarded, he fired again, hitting the center of the vehicle and causing it to explode into pieces. During the April clashes, Baghirov destroyed 7 enemy tanks, 1 Infantry Fighting Vehicle (IFV), 1 command vehicle, and 1 military transport vehicle.

Mirdamat Bahiyev was awarded the 3rd-degree For Service to the Fatherland Order by President Ilham Aliyev on April 19, 2016, for "his special services in preserving the territorial integrity of the Republic of Azerbaijan and his distinguished performance in fulfilling the tasks set before the Armed Forces".

For "his exceptional service in protecting Azerbaijan’s independence and territorial integrity, as well as his distinguished performance in fulfilling military duties", Baghiyev was awarded the "For heroism" medal by the decree of President Ilham Aliyev on June 24, 2019.

=== Second Karabakh War ===
Baghiyev participated in the Second Karabakh War, which lasted from September 27 to November 10, 2020, and his personnel actively participated in the liberation of Talish and Sugovushan villages.

For "his special services in restoring Azerbaijan’s territorial integrity and his exemplary heroism in fulfilling the combat tasks set during the liberation of occupied territories, as well as demonstrating courage and valor while performing his military duties", Baghiyev was awarded the title of Hero of the Patriotic War by the decree of Azerbaijani President Ilham Aliyev on December 9, 2020. Also, for his personal bravery and courage displayed during the military operations for the liberation of Sugovuşan settlement, he was awarded the For the Liberation of Sugovushan Medal by the decree of President Ilham Aliyev on December 29, 2020.

On February 2, 2024, Baghiyev was awarded the Jubilee medal "100 years of Heydar Aliyev (1923–2023)" by the decree of President Ilham Aliyev.

== Awards ==
- Azerbaijani Army 90th Anniversary Medal (26 June 2008)
- Azerbaijani Army 95th Anniversary Medal (26 June 2013)
- 3rd-degree For Service to the Fatherland Order (20 April 2016)
- Azerbaijani Army 100th Anniversary Medal (26 June 2018)
- 3rd-degree For Faultless Service Medal (26 June 2018)
- For Heroism Medal (24 June 2019)
- Hero of the Patriotic War (9 December 2020)
- For the Liberation of Sugovushan Medal (29 December 2020)
- Jubilee medal "100 years of Heydar Aliyev (1923–2023)" (2 February 2024)
