= Baylar Eyyubov =

Azerbaijani general

Baylar Eyyubov Bəylər Eyyubov
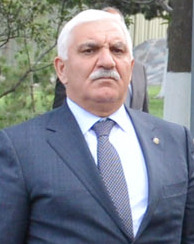

Chief of the Secretariat of the President
- Incumbent
- Assumed office 30 June 2025
- Preceded by: Dilara Seyidzade

Chief of the Security Service of the President
- In office 16 March 2020 – 30 June 2025
- Preceded by: Position established
- Succeeded by: Farid Asgarov

First Deputy Chief of the Special State Protection Service
- In office 2 June 2003 – 16 March 2020

Personal details
- Born: 11 March 1951 (age 75) Shirazly, Vedi District, Armenian SSR, USSR
- Citizenship: Azerbaijan

Military service
- Rank: colonel general

Baylar Hasan oghlu Eyyubov (Azerbaijani: Bəylər Həsən oğlu Eyyubov, born 11 March 1951) is a Colonel-General, the Chief of the Security Service of the President of the Republic of Azerbaijan. First Deputy Chief of the Special State Protection Service of the Republic of Azerbaijan (2003–2020). He has been described as an influential actor in Azerbaijani politics due to his close relationship to Azerbaijan's authoritarian leader Ilham Aliyev.

During his two decades as head of security for Ilham Aliyev, Eyyubov has enriched himself considerably. Even though his only known source of wealth is a modest government salary for the last thirty years, his family has spent at least $160 million through secretive offshore companies on real estate in the United Kingdom and Dubai.

== Biography ==
Baylar Eyyubov was born on March 10, 1951, in Shirazly village.

On September 20, 1993, Baylar Eyyubov was appointed Deputy Chief of the Main Security Department of the Supreme State Authorities and Management Bodies of the Republic of Azerbaijan. On June 2, 2003, Baylar Eyyubov was appointed First Deputy Chief of the Special State Protection Service of the Republic of Azerbaijan. Since March 16, 2020, B. Eyyubov has been the Chief of the Security Service of the President.

Eyyubov has been linked to impropriety. A Wikileaks cable indicates that a French businessman claimed that he was forced to sell his share in an Azerbaijani brewery due to pressure from Eyyubov. Eyyubov's name appeared in the Pandora Papers, which showed that Eyyubov used the services of offshore corporate service providers. A Zurich-based bank helped Eyyubov set up a company in the British Virgin Islands. His companies show patterns of suspicious activity.

== Personal life ==
He married the grand-niece of Heydar Aliyev, the longstanding Soviet party boss in the Azerbaijan Soviet Socialist Republic. His wife was reported to work for Azerbaijan’s State Institute of Botany in 2016. They have at least five children.

His daughter, Elvira Eyyubova, works as a lifestyle coach in London, United Kingdom.

== Awards ==
- Sharaf Order — March 10, 2021
- Azerbaijani Flag Order — December 26, 1998
- For service to the Fatherland Order (1sr degree) — March 9, 2011
- For service to the Fatherland Order (2nd degree) — August 21, 2010
- For service to the Fatherland Order (3rd degree)
- Jubilee medal "10th anniversary of the Armed Forces of the Republic of Azerbaijan (1991-2001)"
- "90th Anniversary of the Armed Forces of Azerbaijan (1918–2008)" Medal
- "95th Anniversary of the Armed Forces of Azerbaijan (1918–2013)" Medal
- Azerbaijani Army 100th anniversary medal
- Medal "For Distinguished Service" (1st degree)
- Medal "For Distinguished Service" (2nd degree)
- Medal "For Distinguished Service" (3rd degree)
- Anniversary medal "20th anniversary of the Special State Protection Service of the Republic of Azerbaijan (1993-2013)"
