= Arif Babayev (singer) =

Azerbaijani singer (1938–2025)

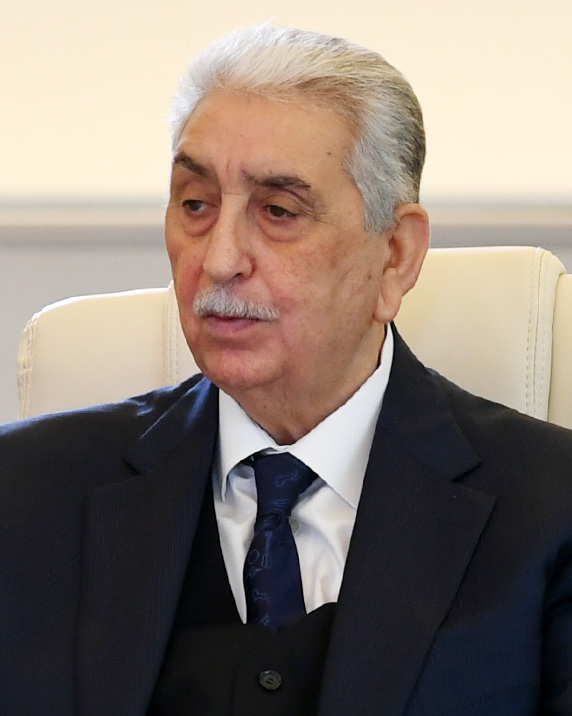
- Babayev in 2019
- Born: Arif İmran oğlu Babayev; 20 February 1938; Sarıhacılı, Azerbaijan SSR, USSR
- Died: 1 August 2025 (aged 87); Baku, Azerbaijan
- Education: Azerbaijan State University of Culture and Arts
- Occupation: Singer

Arif İmran oğlu Babayev (20 February 1938 – 1 August 2025) was an Azerbaijani mugham singer.

== Life and career ==
Born in Sarıhacılı on 20 February 1938, Babayev graduated from the Azerbaijan State University of Culture and Arts in 1962. From 1963 to 1966, he worked for the Azerbaijan State Academic Philharmonic Hall. In 1966, he collaborated with the Azerbaijan State Academic Opera and Ballet Theater. In 1984, he was hired by the Hajibeyli Azerbaijan State Conservatoire as a singing teacher. He also wrote multiple mugham songs, based on the genre traditions of artists such as Seyid Shushinski, Khan Shushinski, and Zulfu Adigozalov.

Arif Babayev died in Baku on 1 August 2025, at the age of 87.

== Awards ==
- Honored Artist of the Azerbaijan SSR (1978)
- People's Artiste of the Azerbaijan SSR (1989)
- Shohrat Order (1998)
- Personal Pension of the President of Azerbaijan (2002)
- Istiglal Order (2008)
- “Gizil Chinar” International Award (2010)
- Sharaf Order (2018)
- Honorary Diploma of the President (2023)
- Jubilee medal "100 years of Heydar Aliyev (1923–2023)" (2024)
- Heydar Aliyev Mükafatı (2025)
