= Orders, decorations, and medals of Azerbaijan =

State awards of the Azerbaijani Republic include the orders, decorations, and medals.

The following is a list of these awards of Azerbaijan.

== Orders ==
Description	Orders	Note
	Heydar Aliyev Order	Supreme Order of Azerbaijan
	Istiglal Order	
	Shah Ismail Order	Supreme Military Order of Azerbaijan
	Azerbaijani Flag Order	
	Sharaf Order	
	Shohrat Order	
	Dostlug Order	
	For service to the Fatherland First Class Order	
	For service to the Fatherland Second Class Order	
	For service to the Fatherland Third Class Order	
	First Class "Labor" Order	
	Second Class "Labor" Order	
	Third Class "Labor" Order	

== Medals ==
Description	Medals	Note
	Hero of the Patriotic War Medal	the special decoration of the Hero of the Patriotic War
	Qizil Ulduz Medal	the special decoration of the National Hero of Azerbaijan
	“For Fatherland” Medal	
	For Heroism Medal	
	Taraggi	
	For military services medal	
	“For distinction in military service” Medal	
	“For distinction in the border” Medal	
	“For merits on military collaboration” Medal	
	“Veteran of Armed Forces of the Azerbaijani Republic” Medal	
	The 10th Anniversary of the Armed Forces of the Azerbaijani Republic 1991-2001” Medal	Approved by Law No. 331-IIQ dated May 17, 2002; awarded to officers, second lieutenants and midshipmen who completed active military service in the armed forces by June 26, 2002; worn on the left side of the chest, after the medal "Veteran of the Armed Forces of the Republic of Azerbaijan".
	The 90th Anniversary of the Armed Forces of Azerbaijan 1918-2008 Medal	Established in accordance with the decree of the President of Azerbaijan Ilham Aliyev on May 16, 2008; eligible personnel include warrant officers and ensigns who succeeded in combat training while serving in the armed forces until June 26, 2008, as well as retired officers who actively participated in the formation and strengthening of the Armed Forces of the Republic of Azerbaijan. The medal is worn on the left chest, and in the presence of other orders and medals, it is attached after the "10th Anniversary of the Armed Forces of the Republic of Azerbaijan (1991–2001)" Medal. A round shaped medal that is made of bronze with a 35 mm diameter which is plated with gold ornaments.
	The jubilee medal on the occasion of the 100th anniversary of the state security and foreign intelligence agencies (1919–2019)	
	“For blameless service” Medal	
	The Jubilee medal of "100th Anniversary of the Diplomatic Service Bodies of the Republic of Azerbaijan (1919–2019)"	
	Azerbaijan Democratic Republic 100th anniversary medal	
	For the Liberation of Khojavend Medal	
	For the Liberation of Fuzuli Medal	
	For Faultless Service Medal	Approved by Law of Azerbaijan Republic by Decree No. 330 – IIQ, on May 17, 2002. The 3rd class medal is silver color, the second class is gold color, the 1st class is gold color, the crescent and the eight-pointed star are white color, the rifles are silver color and the anchor is black color. Rare side of the medal is flat with “For 20 years faultless service” words on the 1st class medal, “For 15 years of faultless service” on the 2nd class medal, with “For 10 years of faultless service” on the 3rd class medal in the center and with a crescent and an eight-pointed star on a national ornament. The medal is pinned to the chest with a satin ribbon of 27x43 mm size and a ring and loop. There are vertical olive and white color stripes of 1 mm width and blue and white color vertical stripes of 3 mm located in a sequence from the corners to the center of the satin ribbon. There is one vertical 1 mm gold color stripe on the 1st class medal, 2-3 such stripes on the 2nd and 3rd class medals. A 27x9 mm mould covered with the same satin is attached to the medal for pinning to the chest.
	Courage Medal	For Courage. The medal is made of bronze and painted gold, in a circular shape 36 mm in diameter and 3 mm thick. On the front is an eight-pointed-star with a flame in the middle and the inscription "ŞÜCAƏTƏ GÖRƏ" ("For Courage") above. A wreath of oak leaves is below the star. On the back of the medal, the words "AZƏRBAYCAN RESPUBLİKASININ MEDALI ŞÜCAƏTƏ GÖRƏ" ("Medal of the Republic of Azerbaijan For Courage") are written, along with the number of the medal. It has a ring attached to the top, connected to a pentagonal ribbon of gray and dark blue stripes, separated by small white stripes. At the top of the ribbon is a small metal plate with stars, laurel leaves, and crescents.

== See also ==
- Armed Forces of the Azerbaijani Republic

== Links ==
- World Awards
- I.Repetski Orders and medals of Azerbaijan. Reference catalog
