= Raguf Orujov =

Lieutenant-colonel of the Azerbaijani Armed Forces (1972-2016)

- Raquf Orucov
- Born: July 12, 1972; Agdam District, Azerbaijan
- Died: April 2, 2016 (aged 43); Ganja, Azerbaijan
- Burial place: Martyrs' Lane in Sumqayit
- Military career
- Allegiance: Azerbaijan
- Branch: Azerbaijani Armed Forces
- Service years: 1990—2016
- Rank: Lieutenant colonel
- Nickname: Eagle of Murov (Azerbaijani: Murov qartalı)
- Conflicts: First Nagorno-Karabakh War; Four-Day War †
- Awards: For Heroism Medal; For military services medal "For Distinction in Military Service " medal (Azerbaijan) "For Faultless Service" medal 1st degree “The 10th Anniversary of the Armed Forces of the Azerbaijani Republic 1991-2001” Medal “The 90th Anniversary of the Armed Forces of Azerbaijan 1918-2008” Medal

Raguf Orujov (Azerbaijani: Raquf İbrahim oğlu Orucov) (12 July 1972, Agdam District, Azerbaijan – 2 April 2016, Ganja, Azerbaijan) was a lieutenant colonel of the Azerbaijani Armed Forces who fought in the First Nagorno-Karabakh War, and later the 2016 Nagorno-Karabakh clashes where he was killed. He was posthumously awarded the "For heroism" Medal.

== Early life and education ==
Raguf Orujov was born on 12 July 1972 in Dzhinli village of Agdam District to the family of Raya and Ibrahim Orujovs. He was the firstborn of the family and had three brothers and one sister. He served in the Soviet Army in the 1990s, later left the army and joined the ranks of the Azerbaijani Armed Forces. Once, Raguf got heavy injuries in the military operations. He suffered a heavy debris injury during four months of his military operations in the village of Aranzami. At that time, his uncle Azer Rahimov was killed as a result of Armenians firing Agdam District.

On June 12, 1993, the Armenian army attacked the Dzhinli village of Agdam District. Despite the fightings between Azerbaijani and Armenian sides, Armenian forces occupied the territory of the Dzhinli village. As a result of the occupation, his mother was killed in their native village by Armenian soldiers.

In the same year, Raguf Orujov applied to the Baku High Infantry Commanders School, but was not admitted. Nevertheless, he did not lose his enthusiasm and applied to the same school the following year and was admitted to the school of Azerbaijani Armed Forces.

=== Family background ===
Raguf Orujov married Sevinj Alizadeh in 1999. The Orujovs had two sons, Agshin and Nihad.

== Military career ==
Raguf Orujov gained the necessary military knowledge within two years at the Baku High Infantry Commanders School. After completing his education at the Baku High Infantry Commanders School in 1996, he was later assigned to one of the military units in Baku, but a young officer preferred to be in the front-line. In 1996, he took the assignment to Murovdagh and continued his career as the commander of the intelligence division.

=== Four-Day War ===
The Four-Day April War was his last battle. Lieutenant-colonel Raguf Orujov was one of the commanders of military units with the richest military background.

On the night from 1 to 2 April 2016 a military conflict between the Azerbaijani and Armenian armed forces took place along the line of contact in Nagorno-Karabakh. A ceasefire was reached on 5 April. Lieutenant colonel Raguf Orujov died on the 2nd of April during 2016 Nagorno-Karabakh clashes.

== Awards ==
State awards

- The medal "For Distinction in Military Service" (Azerbaijan) 1995;
- For military services medal 1998;
- The 10th Anniversary of the Armed Forces of Azerbaijan 1991-2001 Medal, 2001
- For Faultless Service medal 2003, 2003
- The 90th Anniversary of the Armed Forces of Azerbaijan 1918-2008 Medal, 2008
- For Faultless Service medal 2nd class, 2008
- The 95th Anniversary of the Armed Forces of Azerbaijan 1918-2013 Medal, 2013
- For Faultless Service medal 1st class, 2013
- For Heroism Medal, 2016

== Legacy ==
Before the Garabagh - Dudelanj (2: 0) football match, which was held within UEFA Champions League Second qualifying round on July 12, 2016, a banner was opened at the Tofiq Bahramov Republican Stadium on the same day to commemorate Raquf Orujov's 44th anniversary. The banner featured Raguf Orujov's image and the inscription "İmmortal Commandir Raguf Orujov".

A presentation ceremony of the book titled "Eagle of Murov" dedicated to the military activities of Rauf Orujov was held at the Baku Oxford School On February 13, 2017. Most of the prominent figures of Azerbaijan including Ganira Pashayeva, Adil Aliyev, Fuad Muradov, Ilham Zakiyev, Farid Mansurov, Fariz Mammadov, Elmira Süleymanova and others attended the presentation. The book was written based on the memories of fellow soldiers and family members.

Raguf Orujov was buried in the Martyrs' Lane in Sumqayit. Personal belongings to Lieutenant Colonel Raguf Orujov are preserved in the Patriotic War Fund of the National Museum of History of Azerbaijan.

== See also ==
- 2016 Nagorno-Karabakh clashes
- "For heroism" Medal
