= Dostlug Order =

Dostlug Order "Dostluq" ordeni
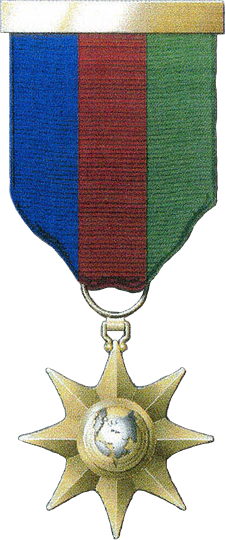
- Dostlug Order
- Type: Individual Award
- Awarded for: special contribution to development of friendly, economical and cultural relations between Azerbaijan and a foreign state, strengthening of international friendship, building of constructive relations among civilizations and carrying on a dialog among cultures, establishment of peace and stability among countries, regions and in the whole world.
- Eligibility: Azerbaijani government's citizens and non-citizens, foreign civilians
- Status: Active
- Established: 16 February 2007, by the Decree No. 248-IIIQ

Precedence
- Next (higher): Heydar Aliyev Order, Istiglal Order, Shah Ismail Order, Azerbaijani Flag Order, Shohrat Order, Sheref Order
- Next (lower): For service to the Fatherland Order

“Dostlug” Order (Azerbaijani: "Dostluq" ordeni) – translated as the Order of Friendship, is the order of Azerbaijan Republic. The order is ratified by Ilham Aliyev-the President of Azerbaijan Republic on 16 February 2007 by the Decree No. 248-IIIQ.

== Status ==
The “Dostlug” Order of Azerbaijan Republic is given to the citizens of Republic of Azerbaijan, foreign nationals and non-citizens for the following services:

- special contribution to development of friendly, economical and cultural relations between Azerbaijan and a foreign state;
- special contribution to strengthening of international friendship;
- special contribution to building of constructive relations among civilizations and carrying on a dialog among cultures;
- special contributions to establishment of peace and stability among countries, regions and in the whole world.

The order is pinned to the left side of the chest. If there are any other orders and medals of Azerbaijan Republic is followed by them, and follows Heydar Aliyev Order, Istiglal Order, Shah Ismail Order, Azerbaijani Flag Order, Shohrat Order, Sheref Order up to the “For service to the Fatherland” Order.

== Elements ==
The order is made of gold and represents an eight-pointed star with sharp ends. A golden relief with the image of bird’s wings is mounted to the plate. A picture of the Earth made of lustrous platinum is depicted between the wings of the bird made of dark-yellow colored gold. The order is decorated with ribbon in the colors of the National Flag of Azerbaijan. The rear side of the order is polished and has an engraved order number in the center. The order set includes:

- for hanging around the neck: the ribbon in the colors of the National Flag of Azerbaijan (width 23 mm) and the order (50 mm x 50 mm).
- for pinning to the chest: the ribbon in the colors of the National Flag of Azerbaijan (21 mm x 50 mm) and the order (35 mm x 35 mm).
- element for pinning to the chest: plate colored with the colors of the National Flag of Azerbaijan (1 mm x 15 mm).

== Recipients ==
- Ruslan Aushev
- Alexander Dzasokhov
- Murad Kajlayev
- Joseph Kobzon
- Krzysztof Krajewski
- Nikita Mikhalkov
- Sergey Naryshkin
- Alla Pugacheva
- Gianfranco Ravasi
- Roald Sagdeev
- Mikhail Shvydkoy
- Leonid Slutsky (politician)
- Vitali Smirnov
- Olzhas Suleimenov
- Aman Tuleyev
- Mahmoud Vaezi
- Vaira Vīķe-Freiberga
- Vladimir Yakunin
- Alexander Zhilkin
- Alexander (Ishein), Archbishop of Baku and Azerbaijan from 1999 to 2021
- Reza Deghati
- Irina Vlah
- Baghdad Amreyev
- Fatih Birol
