= Maksuma Melikova =

Azerbaijani legal scientist

- Максума Меликова
- Born: 22 November 1929 (age 96); Baku, Azerbaijan Soviet Socialist Republic, Soviet Union
- Occupation: Legal scientist
- Years active: 1960s–present
- Spouse: Sabir Razzagov
- Children: 2

Maksuma Fazil gizi Melikova (Azerbaijani: Məlikova Məsumə Fazil qızı; born 22 November 1929) is an Azerbaijani legal scientist. She has been working at the Baku State University Law School since 1952, firstly as a lecturer, then as a senior lecturer, associate professor and finally professor. Melikova has written around 300 monographs, teaching aids and textbooks and researched the framework of Azeri legal history and legal theory. She was also a member of the Central Committee of the Communist Party of the Soviet Union and the Presidential Council of the Azerbaijan SSR. Melikova is a recipient of the Order of the Badge of Honour, the Medal "Veteran of Labour", the Shohrat Order and the Medal for Distinction in Military Service.

== Early life and education ==
Melikova was born in Baku, Azerbaijan Soviet Socialist Republic on 22 November 1929. From 1947 to 1952, she studied at the Baku State University Law School. Following her graduation with a Doctor of Laws degree in 1952, Melikova went on to complete her postgraduate studies at Lomonosov Moscow State University in 1956, defending her candidate's thesis on the topic Socio-political views of Mirza Fatali Akhundov.

== Career ==
She was retained as a lecturer at the Department of State Law of the Faculty of Law of the university in 1952, in the field of teaching scientific and pedagogical activity. Melikova was a lecturer from 1956 to 1958, then as a senior lecturer between 1958 and 1960, and as an associate professor from 1960 to 1968. From 1968, she has been the head of the Department of Theory and History of the Baku State University Law School, and defended her doctoral thesis Political and legal views of Azerbaijani enlighteners in the second half of the 19th century - the beginning of the 20th century in 1973. Melikova was appointed to the post of professor in 1974 and was elected a corresponding member of the Azerbaijan National Academy of Sciences (ANAS) on 30 June 1989, serving as Chairman of the Council on Problems of Legal Sciences under ANAS.

She is the author of approximately 300 monographs, teaching aids and textbooks such as the Azerbaijani Soviet Encyclopedia and the Encyclopedic Dictionary of Law of which she has been the editor-in-chief. She has researched within the framework of legal history and legal theory in Azerbaijan. Melikova was a member of the editorial board of the Moscow journal History of the State and Law, the Azerbaijani-Russian journal International Law and Comparative Law, Legal State and Law, Bulletin of ANAS on history, law and philosophy and was the editor of the Bulletin of Baku University journal.

She was a member of the Communist Party of the Soviet Union from 1952. In July 1990, Melikova became a member of the Central Committee of the Communist Party of the Soviet Union and she also became a member of the Presidential Council of the Azerbaijan SSR. She was a member of the commission for the preparation of the 1978 Constitution of the Azerbaijan SSR and the 1995 Constitution of the Republic of Azerbaijan under president Heydar Aliyev. Melikova was also on the scientific advisory councils of the Supreme Court of Azerbaijan and the Prosecutor General's Office of Azerbaijan.

== Personal life ==
She was married to the lawyer Sabir Razzagov. There was a son and a daughter of the marriage.

== Awards ==
Melikova is the recipient of numerous orders, medals and honorary decrees. She was accorded the honorary title of Honored Lawyer of the Azerbaijan SSR in 1969. Melikova received the Order of the Badge of Honour in 1976, the Medal "Veteran of Labour" in 1985, the Shohrat Order in 2000 and the Medal for Distinction in Military Service in 2008.
