= Matlab Mutallimli =

Azerbaijani politician (1949–2026)

- Mətləb Mütəllimli

Member of the Supreme Soviet of Azerbaijan
- In office 5 February 1991 – 24 November 1995

Member of the National Assembly of Azerbaijan
- In office 24 November 1995 – 24 November 2000

Personal details
- Born: Matlab Azizulla oglu Mutallimli; 20 May 1949 Horavar, Azerbaijan SSR, Soviet Union
- Died: 7 April 2026 (aged 76)
- Party: ADSP; APFP
- Education: Baku State University Law School
- Occupation: Legal advisor

Matlab Azizulla oglu Mutallimli (Azerbaijani: Mətləb Əzizulla oğlu Mütəllimli; 20 May 1949 – 7 April 2026) was an Azerbaijani politician. A member of the Azerbaijani Popular Front Party and the Azerbaijan Democratic Entrepreneurs Party, he served in the Supreme Soviet of Azerbaijan from 1991 to 1995 and in the National Assembly from 1995 to 2000.

Mutallimli died on 7 April 2026, at the age of 76.
