= Aghamir Sultanov =

Azerbaijani military officer

- Ağamir Əzizxan oğlu Sultanov
- Born: Aghamir Azizkhan oglu Sultanov; Aghsu, Azerbaijan SSR, Soviet Union
- Military career
- Allegiance: Azerbaijani Armed Forces
- Branch: Azerbaijani Land Forces
- Rank: Major general
- Commands: Missile and Artillery forces
- Conflicts: Four-Day War; Second Nagorno-Karabakh War
- Awards: Azerbaijani Flag Order; For Heroism Medal

Aghamir Azizkhan oglu Sultanov (Azerbaijani: Ağamir Əzizxan oğlu Sultanov), is an Azerbaijani military officer, major general serving in the Azerbaijani Armed Forces. He serves as the commander of the Missile and Artillery forces of the Azerbaijani Ministry of Defence. Sultanov is a participant of the 2016 Nagorno–Karabakh clashes, and the 2020 Nagorno-Karabakh war.

== Life and service ==
Aghamir Azizkhan oglu Sultanov is originally from Agsu District of then the Azerbaijan SSR, Soviet Union. By 1994, he had become a lieutenant, by 2013, he had become a lieutenant colonel. By 2016, Sultanov had become a colonel, and took part in the conflict in Nagorno-Karabakh. Sultanov then took part in the 2020 Nagorno-Karabakh war.

Sultanov currently serves as the commander of the Missile and Artillery forces of the Azerbaijani Ministry of Defence. He currently resides in Khirdalan, Absheron District.

== Awards ==
- Sultanov was awarded the Azerbaijani Flag Order in 1994, by the decree of then the President of Azerbaijan, Heydar Aliyev.
- Sultanov was awarded the For Fatherland Medal in 2013, by the decree of the President of Azerbaijan, Ilham Aliyev.
- Sultanov was awarded the For Heroism Medal on 19 April 2016, by the decree of President Aliyev.
- Sultanov was awarded the rank of major general on 7 December 2020, which is the highest military rank in the Azerbaijani Armed Forces, by the decree of President Aliyev.
