= Khoshbakht Yusifzadeh =

Azerbaijani academic (1930–2023)

- Xoşbəxt Yusifzadə
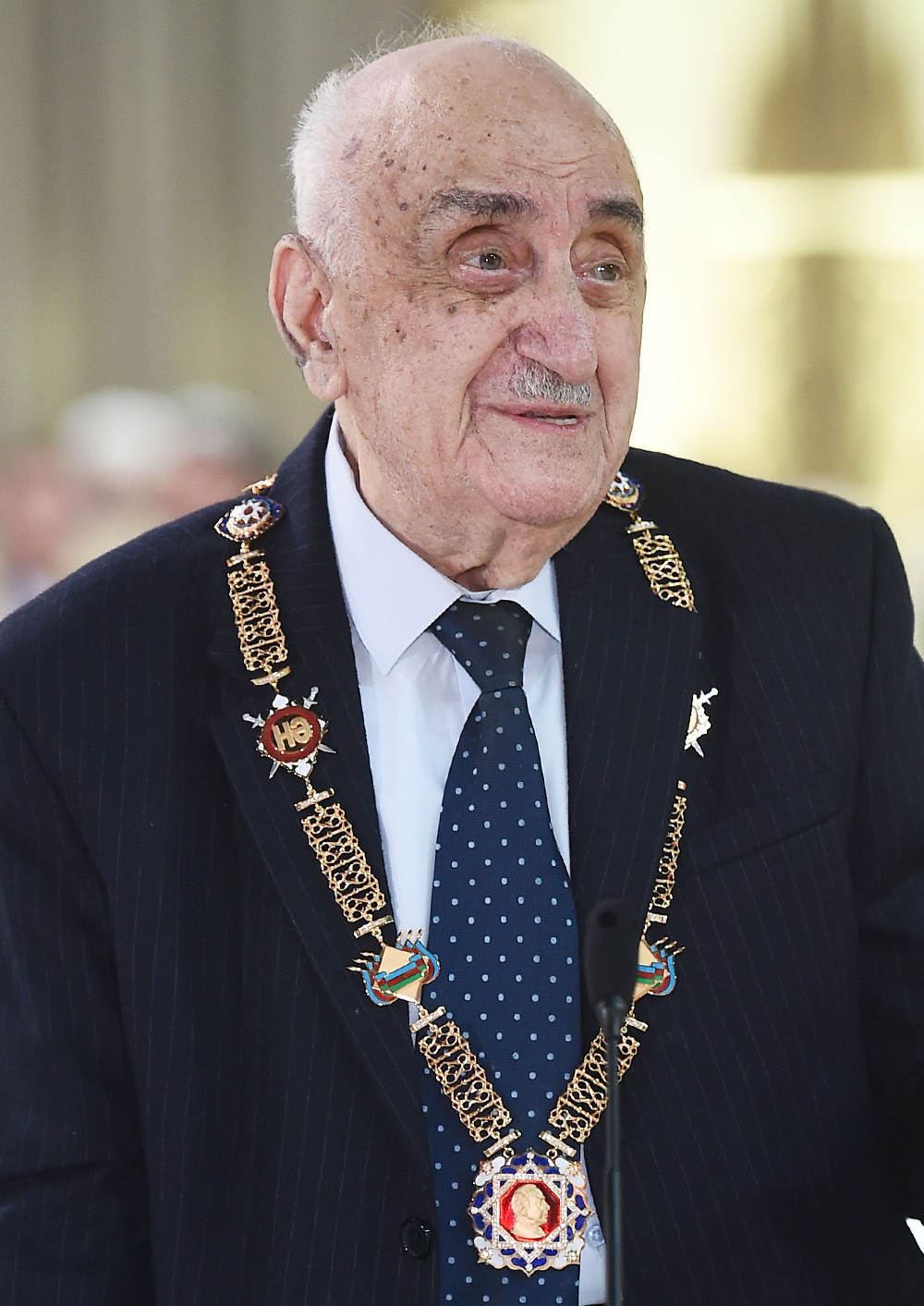
- Yusifzadeh in 2020 wearing the insignia of the Heydar Aliyev Order
- Born: 14 January 1930; Pirshagi, Azerbaijan SSR, Soviet Union
- Died: 3 October 2023 (aged 93)
- Education: Azerbaijan State Oil Academy
- Awards: Heydar Aliyev Order (2020)

Khoshbakht Baghir oglu Yusifzadeh (Azerbaijani: Xoşbəxt Bağır oğlu Yusifzadə; 14 January 1930 – 3 October 2023) was an Azerbaijani academician and the First Vice-President of the State Oil Company of Azerbaijan Republic (SOCAR). He was Doctor of Science in Geology and Mineralogy.

== Biography ==
Khoshbakht Yusifzadeh was born in Pirshagi settlement of Baku on 14 January 1930, during the birthday party of his mother, for which his father named him Khoshbakht which means Happy in Azerbaijani. According to his father Baghi Yusifzade, Khoshbakht was the "first child in Pirshagi to have been born when the music played on".

Yusifzadeh graduated from the Azerbaijani Institute of Industry (now: Azerbaijan State Oil and Industry University) in 1952. He started his career as a geologist and later worked as senior geologist in Neft Dashlary, an offshore city in the Caspian Sea. In 1970, he was appointed Assistant Manager as well as Senior Geologist at the offshore oil and gas production department. Since 1987, Yusifzadeh was Doctor of Science in Geology and Mineralogy, and in 1994, he was appointed Vice-president of SOCAR for Geology, Geophysics and Field Development. Yusifzadeh was known for having discovered numerous oil and gas fields such as Bahar, Gunashli, Azeri, Chirag, Kapaz, etc. He was also a member of Azerbaijan National Academy of Sciences.

Yusifzadeh was married and had two children. He died on 3 October 2023, at age 93.

== Works and awards ==
Yusifzadeh was the author of more than 127 scientific works, as well as 8 monographs and 4 inventions. He was also the author of several books on geology and safety in petroleum industry. Yusifzadeh was twice awarded the Order of the Red Banner of Labour and the Order of Labour Glory, as well as the USSR State Prize (1982 and 1991), Sharaf Order (Order of Honor), Istiglal Order (Order of Sovereignty; 13 January 2000) and numerous medals and honorary decrees.

Yusifzadeh was the honorary geologist of the former USSR and the honored engineer of the Republic of Azerbaijan. He was awarded the title of the Honorary Explorationist of the Earth Crust. He was the member and the First Vice-President of the International Eastern Petroleum Academy and the corresponding member of the Russian International Academy of Engineers. Yusifzade was awarded the title of Scientist of the Year in Turkey in 2009. In January 2010, by the decree of the President of Azerbaijan, 80th anniversary of Yusifzade was held at a state level.

On the occasion of his 90th birthday, he was awarded the Heydar Aliyev Order by the President Ilham Aliyev on 13 January 2020, for his exceptional contribution to and long-term effective activity in the development of the oil industry of Azerbaijan.
