= Aziz Seyidov =

Azerbaijani jurist (born 1956)

Justice of the Supreme Court of Azerbaijan
- Incumbent
- Assumed office 25 April 2017
- Appointed by: National Assembly (Azerbaijan)

Chief State Prosecutor of Baku
- In office 2007–2017

Personal details
- Born: 6 October 1956 (age 70) Ganja, Azerbaijan
- Education: Baku State University Law School

Aziz Jafar oglu Seyidov (Azerbaijani: Əziz Cəfər oğlu Seyidov) (born 6 October 1956) is a Justice of the Supreme Court of Azerbaijan. He took office on 25 April 2017.

He previously served as the Chief State Prosecutor of Baku from 2007 until 2017.

== Early life ==
Aziz Seyidov was born in Ganja, Azerbaijan on 6 October 1956. He finished school in his hometown. After serving in the army, he enrolled in and graduated from Baku State University Law School in 1983 and began work at Nizami raion of Baku city's Prosecutor's Office where he served as an Investigator, Chief Investigator and then as a Chief Investigator of the special cases division of the Prosecutor's Office.

== Career ==
After working in the Nizami Prosecutor's Office and then in the special cases division of Azerbaijan's Prosecutor General's office, Aziz Seyidov transferred to a Military Prosecution Service and between 1993 and 2001 served in various departments of the service as a Military Prosecutor. In 2001, he returned to the State Prosecution Service as a Head of the Department for Supervision over the Execution of Laws of Azerbaijan's Prosecutor General's office. Aziz Seyidov has been the chief prosecutor of Baku, the capital city of Azerbaijan since 2007. He was reappointed to another five-year term in this position in 2012.

=== Supreme Court ===
On 25 April 2017, Aziz Seyidov was elected as a Justice of the Supreme Court of Azerbaijan at a plenary session of National Assembly (Azerbaijan) (Azerbaijani: Milli Məclis).

== Personal life ==
He is married. Has four children.

== Awards ==
- For Heroism Medal - 1998
- Azerbaijani Flag Order - awarded on 27 September 2008 by the order of President of Azerbaijan, Ilham Aliyev.
- Taraggi Medal - awarded on 11 February 2023 by the order of President of Azerbaijan, Ilham Aliyev.

== See also ==
- Supreme Court of Azerbaijan
- Prosecutor General's Office of Azerbaijan
- List of Azerbaijanis
