= Seymur Orujov =

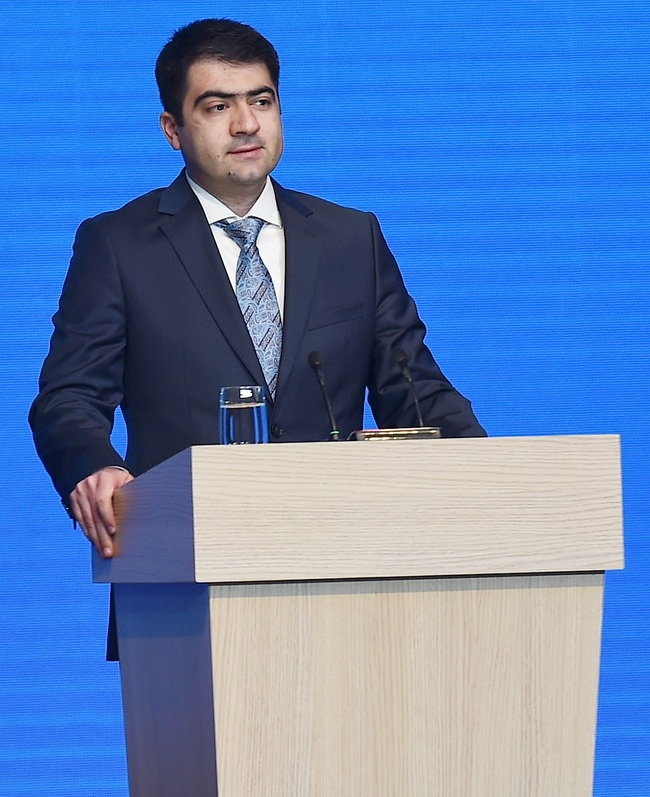

Head of the Executive Power of Aghstafa District
- Incumbent
- Assumed office 21 May 2020
- Preceded by: Nizamaddin Guliyev

Chairman of the Youth Wing of New Azerbaijan Party
- In office 29 January 2011 – 11 March 2021
- Preceded by: Ramil Hasan
- Succeeded by: Baxtiyar Islamov

Personal details
- Awards: Taraggi Medal; Honorary Diploma of the President of Azerbaijan; Jubilee medal "100 years of Heydar Aliyev (1923–2023)"

Seymur Vagif oglu Orujov (born 27 October 1984) is an Azerbaijani public official currently serving as the Head of the Executive Power of Aghstafa District. He is also the former Chairman of the Youth Wing of New Azerbaijan Party.

== Early life and education ==
Seymur Orujov was born on 27 October 1984 in Nakhchivan, Nakhchivan Autonomous Republic. In 2001, he completed his secondary education in Ali Bayramli and enrolled in the Finance and Credit Faculty of the Azerbaijan State University of Economics.

He earned his bachelor's degree in 2005 and completed a master's degree in the same field in 2007. He later worked as a postgraduate researcher and lecturer at the university.

== Academic and professional career ==
From 2006 to 2009, he served as Chairman of the Student Trade Union Committee of the Azerbaijan State University of Economics.

In 2010, he defended his dissertation titled "Regulation of State Budget Revenues and Expenditures" and was awarded a PhD in Economics.

In the same year, he was awarded the Taraggi Medal by the President of Azerbaijan.

== Political and administrative roles ==
From 2009 to 2011, Orujov served as Vice-Rector for Educational Affairs at the Azerbaijan State University of Economics.

On 4 April 2011, he was elected Chairman of the Republican Committee of the Independent Trade Union of Communication Workers.

On 29 January 2011, he was elected Chairman of the Youth Wing of New Azerbaijan Party, a position he held until 11 March 2021.

On 21 May 2020, by a decree of the President of Azerbaijan, he was appointed Head of the Executive Power of Aghstafa District.

== Awards ==
- Taraggi Medal (2010)
- Honorary Diploma of the President of Azerbaijan (2016)
- Jubilee medal "100 years of Heydar Aliyev (1923–2023)" (2024)

== See also ==
- Aghstafa District
- New Azerbaijan Party
