= Mavi Boncuk =

Mavi Boncuk may refer to:

- "Mavi Boncuk", Turkish version of the song "Sana gurban"
- Mavi Boncuk or The Blue Bead, a Turkish comedy film
