= For Service to the Fatherland Order =

Civil order of Azerbaijan

"For service to the Fatherland" Order «Vətənə xidmətə görə» Ordeni
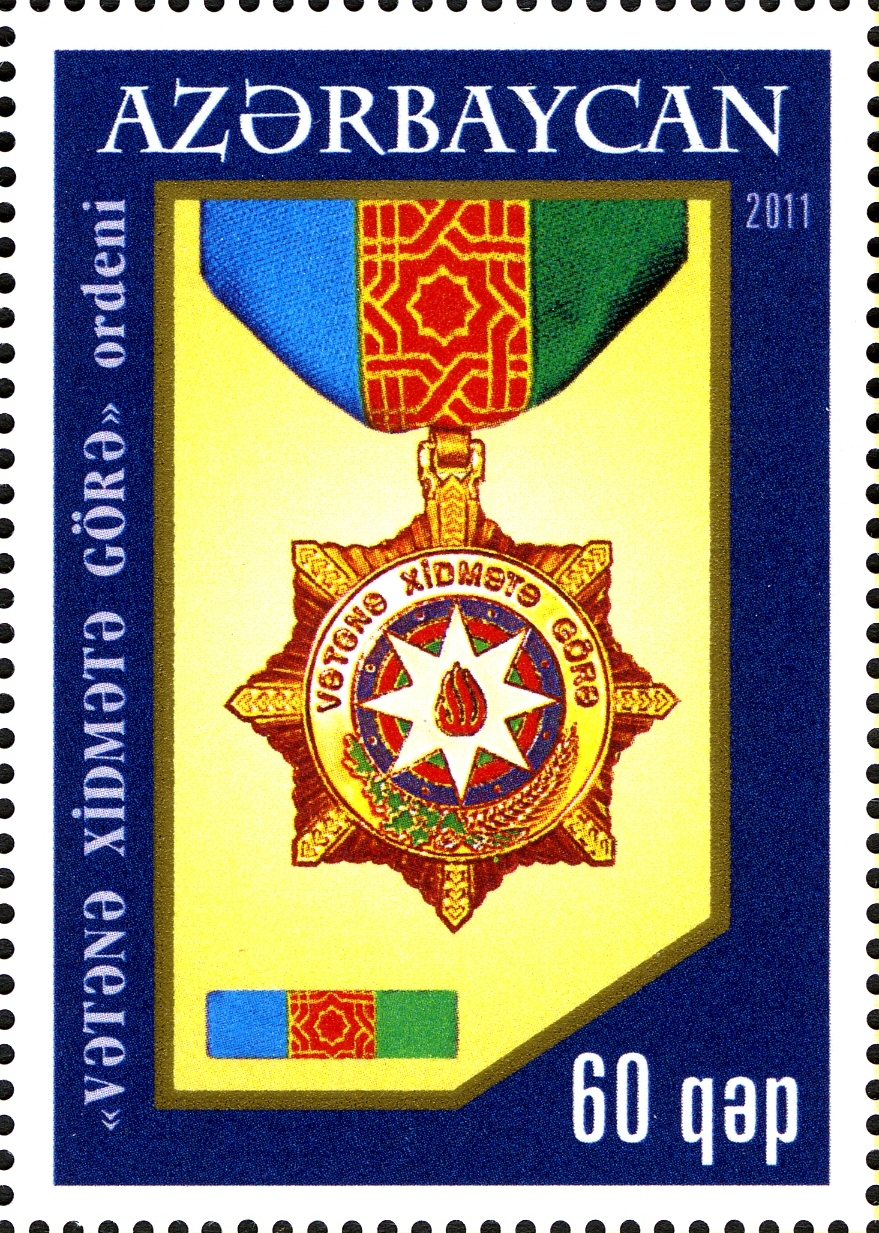
- Postage stamp dedicated to the For service to the Fatherland Order
- Type: Individual Award
- Awarded for: Loyalty to Azerbaijan Republic Performance of administrative duties with dignity and honestly Productive activity Excellence and outstanding services in public service Special contributions to construction of the national state Special contributions in science, education and health sector.
- Country: Azerbaijan
- Status: Active
- Established: November 7, 2003 by the Decree No. 514-IIQ

Precedence
- Next (higher): Heydar Aliyev Order, Istiglal Order, Shah Ismail Order, Azerbaijani Flag Order, Shohrat Order, Sheref Order, Dostlug Order

For service to the Fatherland Order (Azerbaijani: «Vətənə xidmətə görə» Ordeni) is an order of the Azerbaijan Republic. The order was established on November 7, 2003.

== Status ==
"For service to the Fatherland" Order of Azerbaijan Republic awards are given for the following services:

- Loyalty to Azerbaijan Republic, performance of administrative duties with dignity and honesty
- Productive activity, excellence and outstanding public services
- Special contributions to construction of the national state
- Special contributions in the fields of science, education and health

The three classes of the Order are confessed sequentially.

The "For service to the Fatherland" Order is pinned to the left side of the chest. It follows any other orders and medals of Azerbaijan Republic and is in turn followed by Heydar Aliyev Order, Istiglal Order, Shah Ismail Order, Azerbaijani Flag Order, Shohrat Order, Sheref Order and Dostlug Order.
