= For Distinction in Civil Service Medal =

Civil service medal of Azerbaijan

For Distinction in Civil Service Medal Dövlət qulluğunda fərqlənməyə görə medalı
- Current design of the medal, adopted in 2013

Awarded by the President of Azerbaijan
- Type: Civil medal
- Established: 7 November 2003
- Country: Azerbaijan
- Eligibility: Civil servants
- Criteria: Participation in major state-building projects; conscientious service and special merit in state bodies
- Status: Currently awarded
- Ribbon bar

For Distinction in Civil Service Medal (Dövlət qulluğunda fərqlənməyə görə medalı) is a state decoration of Azerbaijan awarded to civil servants. Official English-language Azerbaijani government sources render its name as the "For Distinction in Civil Service" Medal.

The medal was established on 7 November 2003 by Law No. 513-IIQD, which amended Azerbaijan's 1992 law on the establishment of orders and medals. On the same date, Law No. 515-IIQ approved the medal's statute and official description.

== History ==
Law No. 513-IIQD of 7 November 2003 added the medal to the list of medals established by the Republic of Azerbaijan. The law provided that it would enter into force on the day of its publication. Law No. 515-IIQ, signed by President Ilham Aliyev on the same date, separately approved the medal's statute and design.

The design was amended in 2006 by Law No. 172-IIIQD. Among other technical changes, the law expressly specified the medal's diameter as 35 mm and changed the dimensions of its then pentagonal ribbon mount from 27 × 43 mm to 27 × 47.5 mm.

A more extensive redesign was enacted by Law No. 736-IVQD of 30 September 2013. The amendment provided for both a series and number to be engraved on the reverse, replaced the earlier yellowish-pink pentagonal ribbon mount with a 37 × 50 mm rectangular red ribbon, added gold-coloured and black vertical stripes and a bronze-coloured upper plate, changed the dimensions of the accompanying ribbon bar to 37 × 10 mm, and replaced the official sketch of the medal.

== Eligibility and award criteria ==
Under the medal's statute, it may be awarded to civil servants for either of two categories of service: active participation in the preparation and implementation of important projects relating to national state-building, or conscientious work and special services in state bodies.

The medal is worn on the left side of the chest. When the recipient holds other orders and medals of Azerbaijan, the statute provides that the For Distinction in Civil Service Medal is worn after them.

The decoration remains in active use. In June 2025, 193 civil servants were awarded the medal by presidential order for effective service in the civil service. Further awards were made under a presidential order of 23 June 2026; official government bodies subsequently reported the presentation of the medal to their employees.

== Description ==
The current medal is made of bronze and has a diameter of 35 mm. Its obverse consists of a plate decorated with national ornamentation, with the State Emblem of Azerbaijan in the centre. The Azerbaijani words Dövlət qulluğunda fərqlənməyə görə ("For Distinction in Civil Service") appear over rays surrounding the emblem. The inscriptions and images are in relief.

The reverse has a smooth surface with the medal's series and number engraved in the centre. The medal is attached by a ring and loop to a 37 × 50 mm rectangular red moiré ribbon. The ribbon has a light-gold national ornament in the centre and light-gold and black vertical stripes along its edges. A bronze-coloured plate is fixed to the upper portion of the ribbon; its design incorporates a crescent and an eight-pointed star with radiating lines. A matching 37 × 10 mm ribbon bar is supplied with the medal.

== See also ==
- Orders, decorations, and medals of Azerbaijan
