= Gold medal named after Nizami Ganjavi =

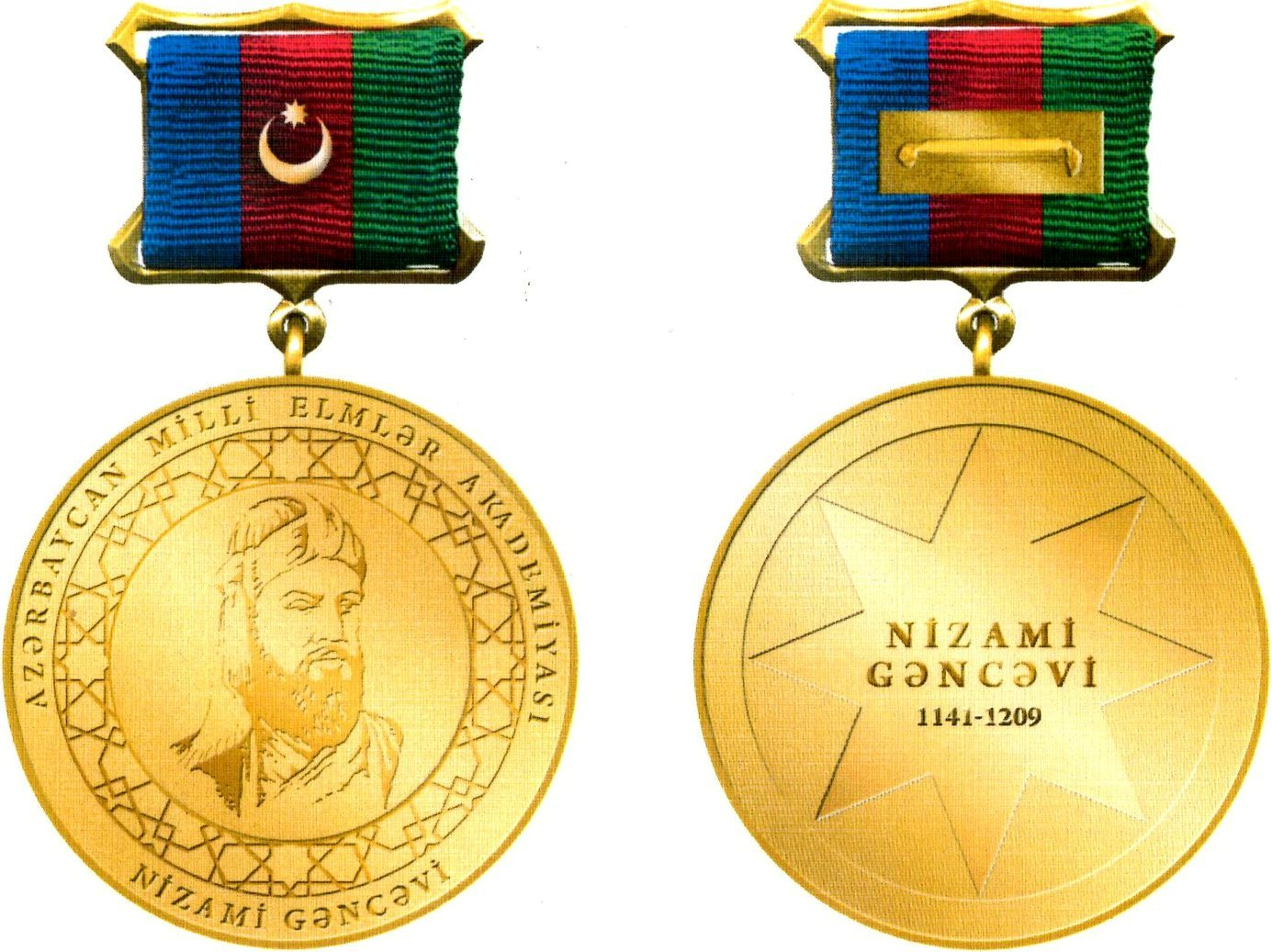
- Date: May 16, 2014
- Country: Azerbaijan

Gold medal named after Nizami Ganjavi (Azerbaijani: Nizami Gəncəvi adına Qızıl medal) is a state award of Azerbaijan. On May 16, 2014, it is established by National Assembly of Azerbaijan and awarded annually to Azerbaijani scientists and a foreigner scientist for their remarkable scientific works.

== History ==
The decision on the establishment "Gold medal named after Nizami Ganjavi" was accepted in the meeting of the National Assembly dated on November 6, 2013. At the same time, it was discussed the issues relating to the description of the medal in the meeting.

National Assembly introduced changes to the Law of Azerbaijan on the establishment of orders and medals of Azerbaijan and providing "Gold Medal named after Nizami Ganjavi" in its plenary meeting dated on May 16, 2014.

== Description of the medal ==
30 mm diameter round medal is bronze and covered with gold. There are three arcs on the front side of the medal. Along the upper arc, from left to right there is written "Azerbaijan National Academy of Sciences" and "Nizami Ganjavi". The image of Nizami Ganjavi is described on this side covered by national patterns. On the reverse side there are an eight-pointed star in the center of the medal and the name of "Nizami Ganjavi" is written inside the star. The date of birth of the poet also indicated on this side.

== Basement for award ==
Gold medal named after Nizami Ganjavi annually awarded to the scientists (an Azerbaijani and a foreign researcher) for their scientific investigation works in order to stimulate them to improve their scientific works. Candidates are nominated according to the decision of the Expert Commission under the Azerbaijan National Academy of Sciences (ANAS). Final decision made by the Board of ANAS in a secret ballot.

This medal is awarded during the lifetime of the scientist.

== See also ==
- Orders, decorations, and medals of Azerbaijan
