= Eyyubov =

Eyyubov is a surname. Notable people with the surname include:

- Baylar Eyyubov (born 1951), Azerbaijani general
- Rashad Eyyubov (born 1992), Azerbaijani footballer
- Yagub Eyyubov (born 1945), Azerbaijani politician
