= Haji Abu-Salam Bath =

- Haji Abu-Salam Bath
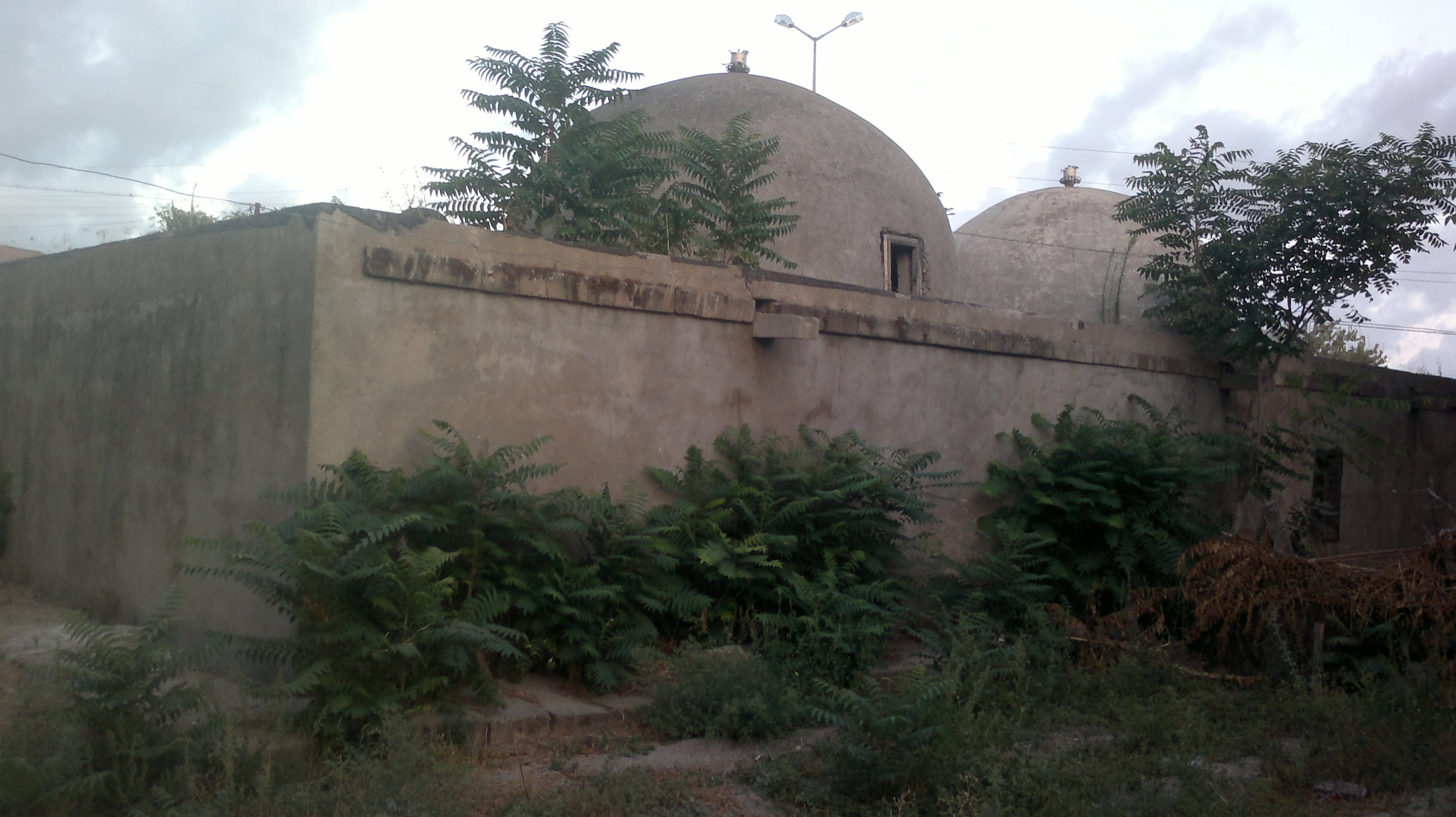
- Current picture of the building
- Interactive map of the Haji Abu-Salam Bath area

General information
- Location: Pirşağı, Sabunchu district, Azerbaijan
- Coordinates: 40°34′14″N 49°53′27″E
- Construction started: 1901
- Construction stopped: 1902

Bath Haji Absalam (Azerbaijani - Hacı Əbu-Salam hamamı ) - is an old bathhouse located in the village of Pirşağı in the Sabunchu district of Baku, Azerbaijan. This is one of the most famous places in the settlement. This building, known as "Sand Bath" among the local population, was built by Haji Shahverdi Shahverdizadeh, a resident of the settlement. It is noted that the bath belongs to the 19th century, Haji Shahverdi built this bath together with his son Mashadi Sadiq Shahverdizade.

== Origin of ritual ==
People have always considered baths as a place of comfort, cleanliness, vitality, health, spiritual peace, relaxation, and renewal of the soul. Rituals that people always perform historically: bathing, washing with water have become the main condition of physical cleanliness.

== History ==
The bathhouse was built in 1901-1902. It belonged to Kerbalai Abusalamoglu. In plan, the building is an elongated rectangle. The premises of the bath are located in one row, while the entrance in the form of a portal is located in the corner of the long facade.

Vugar Shahverdizadeh, one of the grandsons of Mashadi Sadiq Bey , told Okhu.Az that when his grandfather built this bath, he also thought about the residents of the settlement:

My grandfather's father, Shahverdi, was one of the wealthy men. At that time, gentlemen and wealthy people would create conditions for the village community as much as possible. My grandfather's father also decided to build this bath. Our elders say that there are several baths in Pirshagi. However, my grandfather and his father wanted to be built together on the sea shore. They thought that people coming out of the beach during the sea season also go swimming here. This bath has been used by the public since it was built.

Arzu Farzaliyeva, granddaughter of Mashadi Sadiq, one of the builders of the historical bath, told Okhu.Az that there are many mysterious aspects about the bath:

When Babamgil built the bath, they used a strange technique. It was not known among the architects. According to the elders, people who used the bath at that time, one candle was enough to heat the bath. Two deep pits were dug in the bathroom. The water collected on one side was heated and poured into the other tank, and people used that water.

According to the order of the Cabinet of Ministers of the Republic of Azerbaijan on historical and cultural monuments, the bathhouse is a "monument of history and culture of local importance".

Currently, the bathhouse is located in the courtyard of the former pioneer camp "Lokomotiv". Next to the bath there is a bust of Kerbalai Abusalamoglu. According to the instructions of President Ilham Aliyev, since 2019, special improvement works have been started in the settlements of Baku city and Absheron region.
