= Zeynab Khanlarova =

Soviet and Azerbaijani singer (born 1936)

Zeynab Khanlarova Zeynəb Xanlarova
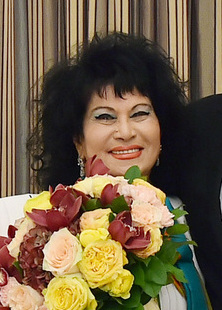
- Khanlarova in 2016

Background information
- Born: 28 December 1936 (age 89); Baku, Azerbaijan SSR, Soviet Union
- Genres: Classical, folk
- Occupation: Singer
- Instrument: Singing
- Years active: 1961–present
- Signature of Zeynab Khanlarova

Zeynab Yahya qizi Khanlarova (Note: Azerbaijani: Zeynəb Yəhya qızı Xanlarova; Russian: Зейнаб Яхья кызы Ханларова, romanized: Zeynab Yakhya kyzy Khanlarova) (born 28 December 1936) is a Soviet and Azerbaijani singer (soprano), People's Artist of the USSR (1980), Azerbaijan (1975), Armenia (1978).

== Biography ==
Zeynab Khanlarova was born on 28 December 1936 in Baku and was the youngest of the family's five children. In 1956, Zeynab Khanlarova graduated from Baku Pedagogical School named after M. A. Sabir. In 1961, she graduated from Seyid Shushinski's class at Baku Musical School named after Asaf Zeynally and became a soloist of the Azerbaijan State Academic Opera and Ballet Theater.

Zeynab Khanlarova was the deputy of Supreme Soviet of Azerbaijan SSR (XI-XII convocations) and the National Assembly of Azerbaijan (I-III convocations).

== Musical career ==
Zenab Khanlarova played Leyli's part in "Leyli and Majnun" opera, Asli's part in "Asli and Karam" opera of Uzeyir Hajibeyov, Arabzangi's part in Magomayev's "Shah Ismayil" opera, and others. Besides that, Zeynab Khanlarova successfully performed in Azerbaijani folk music style mugham. Zeynab Khanlarova's voice can be heard in such mugham compositions as "Shahnaz", "Gatar", "Bayati Shiraz" and many others. Zeynab Khanlarova was also a very successful pop singer. Khanlarova's repertoire includes songs of such composers as Tofig Guliyev, Arif Malikov, Alekper Taghiyev, Emin Sabitoglu, Gara Garayev, Fikret Amirov and many other prominent composers. Khanlarova successfully performed songs in Russian, Armenian, Ukrainian, Romanian, Georgian, Persian, Arabic, Chinese, Indian, Turkish and in many other languages. Zeynab Khanlarova gave concerts in Russia, Ukraine, Latvia, Moldova, Belarus, Kazakhstan, Uzbekistan, Turkmenistan, India, China, Iran, Iraq, Egypt, Israel, Turkey, Georgia, Armenia, Bulgaria, Germany, Poland, Hungary, Austria, Finland, Sweden and Czech Republic.

== Controversy ==
In 2004, she reportedly stated that axe murderer Ramil Safarov was "not only the hero of Azerbaijan, but the hero of the whole world", adding that "he took an Armenian's life, and he was right to do so". She also stated, "I would have done exactly as Ramil did. He did the right thing to take the life of an Armenian".

== Awards and titles ==
- People's Artiste of the Azerbaijan SSR (1975)
- People's Artist of the Armenian SSR (1978)
- People's Artist of the USSR (1980)
- State Prize of the Azerbaijan SSR (1988)
- Shohrat Order of Azerbaijan (1996)
- Istiglal Order (2006)
- Heydar Aliyev Order (2016)
