= Tofig Aghahuseynov =

Soviet-Azerbaijani military leader (1923–2021)

Colonel General Tofig Aghahuseynov (Azerbaijani: Tofiq Yaqub oğlu Ağahüseynov; 1 February 1923 – 12 May 2021) was a Soviet-Azerbaijani military leader. o

== Early life ==
He was born on February 1, 1923, in the city of Nukha of the Azerbaijan SSR in a family of a doctors. In 1930, the family moved to Baku and in the same year he went to school No. 1. In 1940, after graduating from school, he entered the energy faculty of the Azerbaijan Industrial Institute.

== World War Two ==
After the start of the Great Patriotic War, he, on September 29, 1941, voluntarily joined the ranks of the Red Army and was sent to the Baku School of Anti-Aircraft Artillery. In October 1942, after completing an accelerated training course, Lieutenant Aghahuseynov was appointed commander of the control platoon of the 2nd Battery of the 160th Separate Anti-Aircraft Artillery Battalion in Arkhangelsk. He participated in repelling enemy air raids on Arkhangelsk and Severodvinsk. He also participated in the Vistula–Oder offensive and the Battle of Berlin.

== Post-war years ==
In October 1946, he was appointed battery commander of an anti-aircraft battalion in Vilnius, and was posted to Baku the following year. From September 1949 to 1954, he was enrolled as a student at the Dzerzhinsky Artillery Academy. Upon completion of his studies, he was appointed commander of an anti-aircraft artillery battalion in Baku, and from 1955 was an officer of the artillery combat training department at the headquarters of the Baku Air Defense District. From 1968 to 1969, he was commander of the 10th Air Defense Division in the city of Volgograd.

In August 1969, he was appointed commander of the 12th Air Defense Corps in Rostov-on-Don. On 7 June 1975, he was appointed a member of the Military Council and First Deputy Commander of the Baku Air Defense District. He became the district commander on 5 April 1980, serving the territory of the South Caucasus, the Turkmen SSR, and the Black Sea to Rostov and Mariupol. On 6 May 1980, he was appointed Commander of the Air Defense of the Transcaucasian Military District. A week later, the district was disbanded.

On 24 December 1981, by order of Marshal Dmitry Ustinov (the Minister of Defense of the USSR at the time), he was appointed representative of the Commander-in-Chief of the United Armed Forces of the Warsaw Pact member states to the Commander of the Air Defense of the Czechoslovak People's Army. He served in this position for five years. In 1987, due to the length of service, he was transferred to the reserve.

== Service in the National Army ==
In 1992, he became a freelance National Advisor on Military Issues to the President of Azerbaijan. On April 21, 1997, he was called up for military service in the Azerbaijani Armed Forces and was appointed to the newly established position of Assistant to the President of the Republic of Azerbaijan on military issues. He served in this position until 2002. From 12 September 2017 up until 2021, he was the Head of the Organization for War, Labor, and Armed Forces Veterans of the Republic of Azerbaijan – Republican Veterans' Organization.

== Death ==
He died on May 12, 2021. Condolences were offered by the Ministry of Defense of Azerbaijan. He was buried with honors at the Alley of Honor.

Assistant to the President and Head of the Military Affairs Department of the Presidential Administration, Colonel-General Maharram Aliyev, who attended the funeral, presented the state flag on his coffin to his family.

== Military ranks ==
- Lieutenant (1942)
- Major (1954)
- Lieutenant Colonel (1956)
- Colonel (1960)
- Major General (February 3, 1968)
- Lieutenant General (December 5, 1972)
- Colonel General (May 6, 1980)

== Awards ==
- (Azerbaijan) Azerbaijani Flag Order
- (Azerbaijan) Shohrat Order
- (Soviet Union) Order of the October Revolution
- (Soviet Union) Order of the Patriotic War, 1st class
- (Soviet Union) 3 Orders of the Red Star
- (Soviet Union) Medal "For the Liberation of Warsaw"
- (Soviet Union) Medal "For the Capture of Berlin"
- (Czechoslovakia) Order of the Red Star

== See also ==
- Safar Abiyev
- Ministers of Defense of Azerbaijan Republic
- General Staff of Azerbaijani Armed Forces
