= Alexander Ishchein =

Azerbaijani prelate (1952–2021)

His Eminence Alexander (Ishchein)
- Archbishop of Baku and Azerbaijan
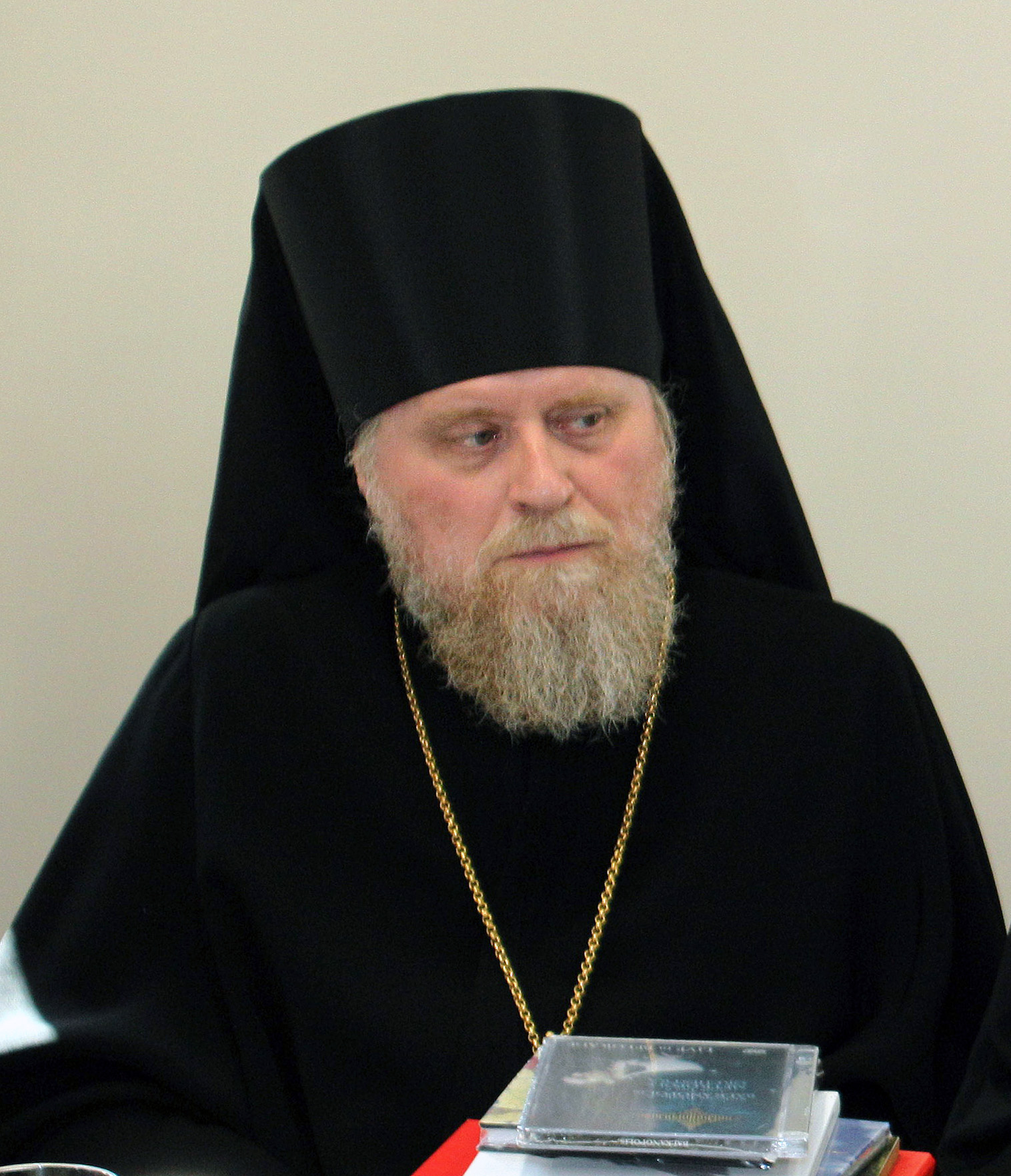
- Native name: Александр Геннадьевич Ищеин
- Church: Russian Orthodox Church
- Archdiocese: Baku and Azerbaijan
- In office: January 14, 1999 – June 10, 2021
- Predecessor: Valentin (Mischuk)

Orders
- Ordination: 1975 by Anthony (Zavgorodniy) of Stavropol and Baku
- Consecration: January 14, 1999 by Patriarch Alexy II of Moscow

Personal details
- Born: June 13, 1952 Yaroslavl, Russian SFSR, Soviet Union
- Died: June 10, 2021 (aged 68) Baku, Azerbaijan
- Buried: Alley of Honor
- Education: Moscow Theological Seminary

Archbishop Alexander (Russian: Александр Геннадьевич Ищеин; 13 June 1952 – 10 June 2021) was an Azerbaijani prelate, who served as the archbishop of Russian Orthodox diocese of Baku and Azerbaijan from 1999 until his death in 2021.

== Biography ==
Born on June 13, 1952, in Yaroslavl, his mother was a teacher, father was a worker. He spent his childhood in Rostov and Yaroslavl. From adolescence, he took an interest in Russian Orthodox Church and studied church literature collected by his grandfather. In 1969 he graduated from high school and entered the Leningrad Chemical and Pharmaceutical Institute.

In 1973–1974 he did military service in the ranks of the Soviet Armed Forces. In 1975, he took monastic vows with the name Alexander and was ordained a hierodeacon by Bishop Anthony (Zavgorodniy) of Stavropol and Baku. On December 19 of the same year he was ordained a hieromonk and sent to serve in the Stavropol diocese. He later graduated from the Moscow Theological Seminary in absentia.

For four years he was rector of the Dormition Church in the city of Mozdok, where the Mozdok Icon of the Mother of God - especially revered in the Caucasus - is located. He served as dean of churches in North Ossetia and contributed to the return of the Church and the restoration of the Ascension Cathedral in the city of Alagir, the church in Vladikavkaz, St. Nicholas Cathedral and the Church of the Image of the Savior Not Made by Hands in the village of Pavlodolskaya. Furthermore, he collected and studied materials on the history of Christianity in the Caucasus.

In 1988, he was elevated to the rank of archimandrite. He served in Dagestan and Azerbaijan. In 1995, he was appointed rector of the Cathedral of the Nativity of the Mother of God in Baku and dean of the Orthodox churches of Azerbaijan.

== As Archbishop ==
On December 28, 1998, by the decision of the Holy Synod, he was elected Bishop of Baku and the Caspian Sea. He was named Bishop of Baku and the Caspian Sea on January 13, 1999, at the Yelokhovo Cathedral in Moscow. He was consecrated Bishop of Baku and the Caspian Sea the day after. The consecration was performed by the Patriarch of Moscow and All Russia Alexy II, Metropolitan of Krutitsky and Kolomna Juvenal (Poyarkov), Metropolitan of Volokolamsk and Yuryevsky Pitirim (Nechaev), Archbishop of Solnechnogorsk Sergius (Fomin), Archbishop of Orenburg) Valentine Bronnitsky Tikhon (Emelyanov), Bishop of Orekhovo-Zuevsky Alexy (Frolov), Bishop of Krasnogorsk Sabbas (Volkov).

During his tenure destroyed churches were restored and new ones were built in Baku, Makhachkala, Kizlyar, Kaspiysk, Izberbash, Buinaksk and Derbent. He was a member of the Inter-Council Presence of the Russian Orthodox Church since July 27, 2009. On March 22, 2011, by the decision of the Holy Synod, due to the fact that Dagestan was transferred to the revived Vladikavkaz diocese, the title was changed to "Baku and Azerbaijan". He was elevated to the rank of archbishop on July 18, 2012, by Patriarch Kirill.

== Death ==
He died from COVID-19 in Baku, Azerbaijan, on June 10, 2021, three days before his 69th birthday. He was buried on June 13, 2021. in Alley of Honor.

== Awards ==
=== Ecclesiastical ===
- Order of the Cross of St. Euphrosyne of the Polotsk Belarusian Orthodox Church (June 24, 2012)
- Order of St. Sergius of Radonezh, 2nd degree.
- Order of the Holy Prince Daniel of Moscow, 3rd degree
- Order of St. Mark of Ephesus, 1st class

=== Secular ===
- Shohrat Order (June 12, 2002, Azerbaijan)
- Dostlug Order (June 11, 2012, Azerbaijan)
- Order of Friendship (April 10, 2017, Russia)
- Honorary Diploma of the President of the Republic of Azerbaijan (November 16, 2015)
