= Special State Protection Service of Azerbaijan =

Special State Protection Service of the Republic of Azerbaijan Azərbaycan Respublikası Xüsusi Dövlət Mühafiz Xidməti
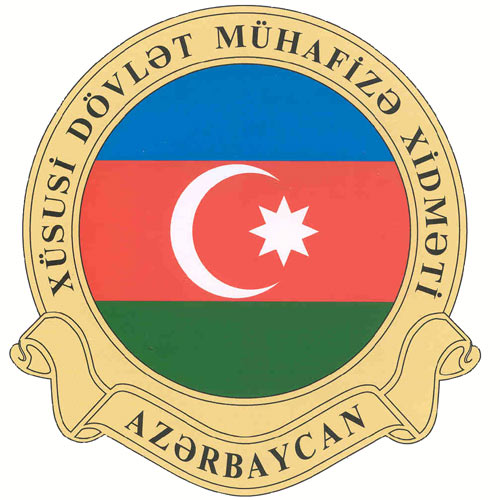
- Seal of Special State Protection Service
- Abbreviation: SSPS

Agency overview
- Formed: 6 May 2002; 24 years ago

Jurisdictional structure
- Operations jurisdiction: Azerbaijan
- Specialist jurisdiction: Protection of international or domestic VIPs, protection of significant state assets

Operational structure
- Headquarters: Abbasgulu Abbaszadeh, 108, Baku, Sabail, AZ1073
- Agency executives: Vagif Akhundov, Chief of SSPS, Col-Gen of Economic Development; Beyler Eyyubov, First Deputy Chief; Niyazi Hajiyev, Deputy Chief
- Child agencies: Special Communication and Information Security State Agency; Azerbaijani National Guard; Azerbaijan Oil and Gas Export Pipeline Security Department

Website
- www.dmx.gov.az/index.htm

The Special State Protection Service of Azerbaijan (Azerbaijani: Xüsusi Dövlət Mühafizə Xidməti; XDMX) is a militarized institution that is under the direct command of the President of Azerbaijan. Since 2020, the organization has been headed by Baylar Eyyubov, a close associate of President Ilham Aliyev.

== Overview ==
The Service provides security of the President of Azerbaijan and his First Family, as well as other state protection objects and also of heads of foreign states and governments (Foreign missions) while their visits to Azerbaijan, properties under the Office of the President's supervision, National Assembly, Constitutional Court, Ministry of Foreign Affairs and Central Election Commission. The Service organizes and provides security and development of special purpose information-telecommunication systems and networks of state authorities.

Special State Protection Service is guided by the Constitution of Azerbaijan, laws of the Republic of Azerbaijan, Presidential decrees and orders, The decrees and orders of the Cabinet of Ministers of Azerbaijan and Milli Majlis, as well as international treaties to which Azerbaijan has joined, Guidelines for the Service.

The Special State Protection Service of Azerbaijan should ensure the safety of the Baku-Tbilisi-Jeyhan pipeline and the South Caucasus Pipeline. With this purpose NATO provided the Service with helicopters and vehicles.

== History ==
For the first time state-level security service was established in Azerbaijan in the period of the Azerbaijan Democratic Republic in 1918–1920. After collapse of the Soviet Union, Azerbaijan began political, economical and military reforms. Within the framework of reforms, government began to create optimal management forms. The importance of the security system has been increased and government developed and enlarged the system.

Special State Protection Service operated as:

- Security Department of the People's Commissariat of Internal Affairs between 1931 and 1937.
- 2nd Division of the Internal Affairs Department of Baku City Executive Committee from 1938 to 1972.
- Security Department of the Party-Soviet Organs of the Ministry of Internal Affairs of the Azerbaijan SSR between 1972 and 1991.

In accordance with Presidential decree dated 25 September 1991, it has become Security Office at the Administration of the President of Azerbaijan and in December of the same year in accordance with Presidential it was called the Department of Protection of the Supreme Authorities and Administration at the Ministry of Internal Affairs. The National Guard was established on 25 December 1991.

On February 25, 1992, Department of Protection of Supreme State Authority and Administrative Organs of the Azerbaijan Republic was established by re-organizing Security Office at the Administration of the President of Azerbaijan and Department of Protection of the Supreme Authorities and Administration at the Ministry of Internal Affairs.

In accordance with presidential decree dated 6 May 2002, Main Security department of Supreme State Authority and Administrative Organs has been called Special State Protection Service of the Republic of Azerbaijan.

== Subordinate agencies ==
=== Special Communication and Information Security State Agency ===
Special Communication and Information Security State Agency was established by presidential decree No 708 dated 26 September 2012. The Agency duties include ensuring special state communication, presidential communication, special-purpose information-telecommunication systems, interdepartmental system of electronic document circulation, internet network of state bodies, organizing the deployment of their internet information resources in the information and resource center, providing security and development of this information information and resource center, monitoring security parameters of information systems of state bodies, providing special technical measures in order to ensure security of state defense objects and protected objects.

The Agency support state bodies to create divisions of information safety. Special Communication and Information Security State Agency ensures protection of any information it get acquainted during work process and guarantees that it will not be disclosed without consent of the user.

Special Communication and Information Security State Agency takes part in development and implementation of state policy in the field of information security, ensures development of cryptologic performance and the application of scientific and technical innovations, as well as organizes training of specialists for the State bodies on specialties of cryptographic and technical protection of information, special telecommunication systems and networks jointly with the Ministry of Education of the Republic of Azerbaijan and other organizations.

=== National Guard ===
National Guard, an armed force of the Government of Azerbaijan, was established on December 25, 1991, in accordance with presidential decree. But the Guard began to operate actively in December 1996 as a semi-independent entity. Today National Guard continues its activity as a part of the Special State Protection Service.

The National Guard has a wartime role as part of Azerbaijan's Land Forces.

=== Azerbaijan Oil and Gas Export Pipeline Security Department ===
The Oil and Gas Export Pipeline Security Department was established in May 2003 for the protection of oil and gas export pipelines in Azerbaijan.

== Assets ==
On November 30, 2007, a training center equipped with modern equipment was established. In 2009, the Ulduz recreation center was established for employees and their families in Nabran in northern Azerbaijan. On October 5, 2005, President Ilham Aliyev attended the opening ceremony of the Heydar Aliyev Museum in the Special State Protection Service. The bust of Heydar Aliyev placed in the museum was created from white Ural marble by a member of the Union of Architects of Azerbaijan Adil Ahmadov and a member of the Union of Artists Islam Jafarov.
