= Dağ Kolanlı =

Village in Azerbaijan

Dağ Kolanlı is a village in the municipality of Poladlı in the Gobustan Rayon of Azerbaijan. In 2014, it was listed as an abandoned village.
