= Vosketap =

Village in Ararat, Armenia

Vosketap Ոսկետափ
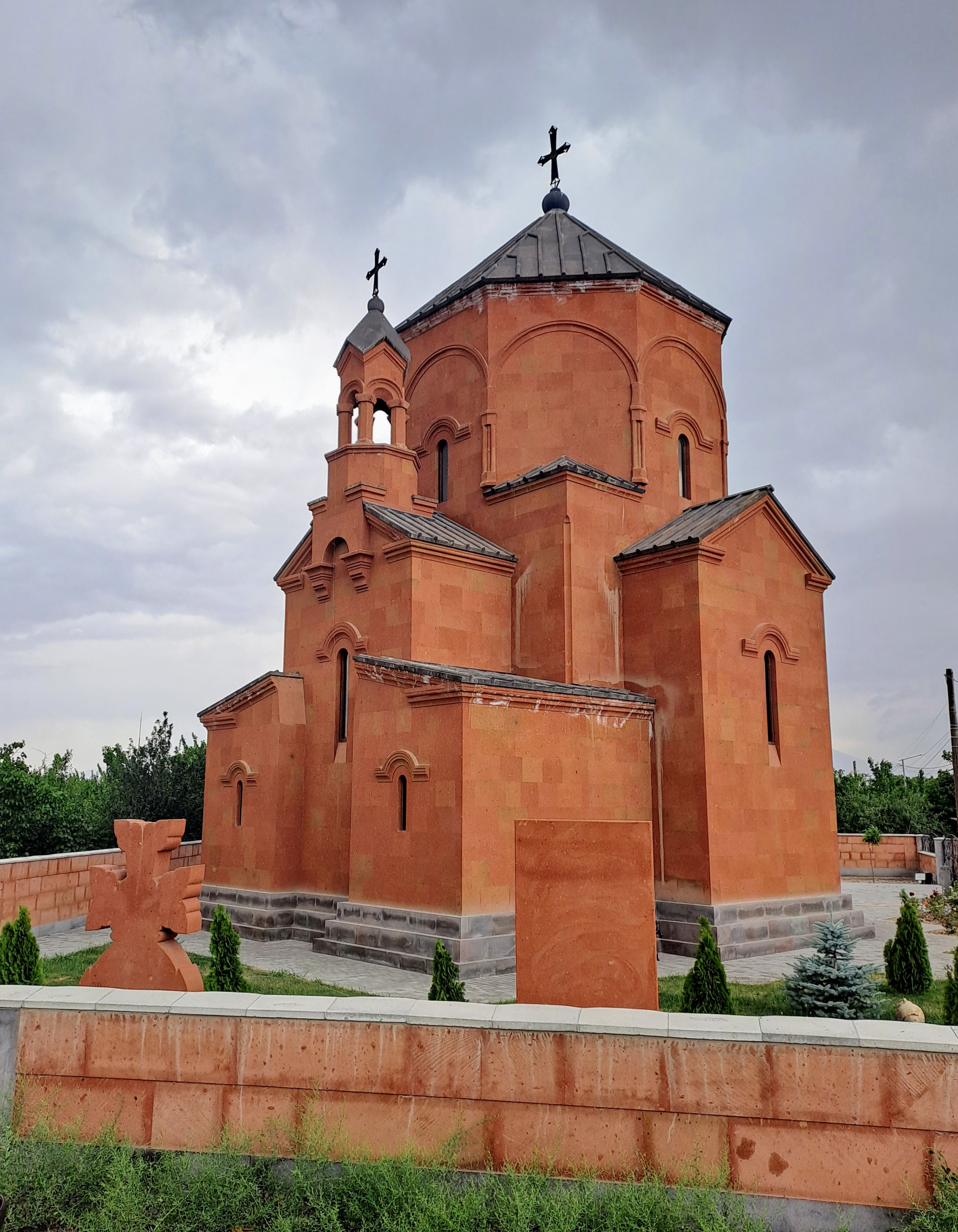
- Saint Sahak-Mesrop Church in Vosketap

- Location within Armenia Location within Ararat
- Coordinates: 39°52′21″N 44°39′16″E
- Country: Armenia
- Province: Ararat
- Municipality: Vedi

Population (2011)
  - Total: 4,808
- Time zone: UTC+4

Vosketap (Armenian: Ոսկետափ; Azerbaijani: Şirazlı) is a village in the Vedi Municipality of the Ararat Province of Armenia. The town's local Azerbaijanis moved following the outbreak of the Nagorno-Karabakh conflict. In 1988-1989 Armenian refugees from Azerbaijan settled in the village.
