= Cinli =

Jinli
- Village
- Azerbaijani: Cinli
- Location within Azerbaijan
- Coordinates: 40°02′N 46°50′E
- Country: Azerbaijan
- District: Agdam
- Time zone: UTC+4 (AZT)
  - Summer (DST): UTC+5 (AZT)

Jinli (Azerbaijani: Cinli) is a village in the Agdam District of Azerbaijan.
