= Alakbar Taghiyev =

- Born: April 28, 1924; Ganja, Azerbaijan
- Origin: Azerbaijan Soviet Socialist Republic
- Died: April 16, 1981 (aged 56); Baku, Azerbaijan
- Occupation(s): Composer, jurist, pianist

Alakbar Taghiyev (Azerbaijani: Ələkbər Tağıyev; April 28, 1924 – April 16, 1981) was an Azerbaijani composer and author of popular Azerbaijani songs.

== Biography ==
He was born in 1922, in Ganja, into a large, low-income family. At the age of 14, he began to work in case of need in secretariat of judicial trials. Soviet Union Judicial Institute and after graduation began to work in Goychay as an investigator. He worked in Public Procurators' Office for more than 30 years and worked until he became the chief of investigation department of Public Procurators' Office of Baku city. He died in Baku.

== Creativity ==
From Alakbar's youth people around him noticed his musical talent, but he chose the other way and engaged in jurisprudence. But absence of special musical talent didn't prevent him from composing his first song called Gonshu gizi ("Neighbour Girl") in 1958, which was heard on the air of Azerbaijan State Television performed by Zeynab Khanlarova. The prominent musician Akif Bakikhanov helped Alakbar Taghiyev to become a composer. Later, Alakbar Taghiyev composed more than 2000 songs and many of them are stored in archive of the composer's son, and only more than 200 of them have been dubbed. There are such well known and popular songs as Arzu gizim ("My daughter Arzu"), Istayiram goram sani ("I want to see you"), Sana gurban, San galmaz oldun ("You didn't come") among them. His songs were performed by such prominent Azerbaijani singers as Rashid Behbudov, Shovkat Alakbarova, Sara Gadimova, Rubaba Muradova, Zeynab Khanlarova, Islam Rzayev, Flora Kerimova, Nisa Gasimova, Mammadbaghir Baghirzade, Faig Aghayev and others. Because of the absence of the musical education Alakbar Taghiyev was not allowed to the Union of Azerbaijani Composers, but in spite of that he was chosen to the Musical Fund of the USSR at the eminent Azerbaijani conductor Niyazi's and composer Tofig Guliyev's insistence.

The composer's Sen gelmez oldun song is often mistaked to be folk music.

== Videolinks ==
- San galmaz oldun song performed by Alihan Samedov.
- San galmaz oldun song performed by Sogdiana – "Vspominay menya" ("Remember me").

== Audiolinks ==
- San galmaz oldun song performed by Byanka – "Izmena" ("Betrayal").
- San galmaz oldun song performed by Sogdiana – "Vspominay menya" ("Remember me").
- San galmaz oldun song performed by Faig Aghayev.
