= Medal for distinction in the border (Azerbaijan) =

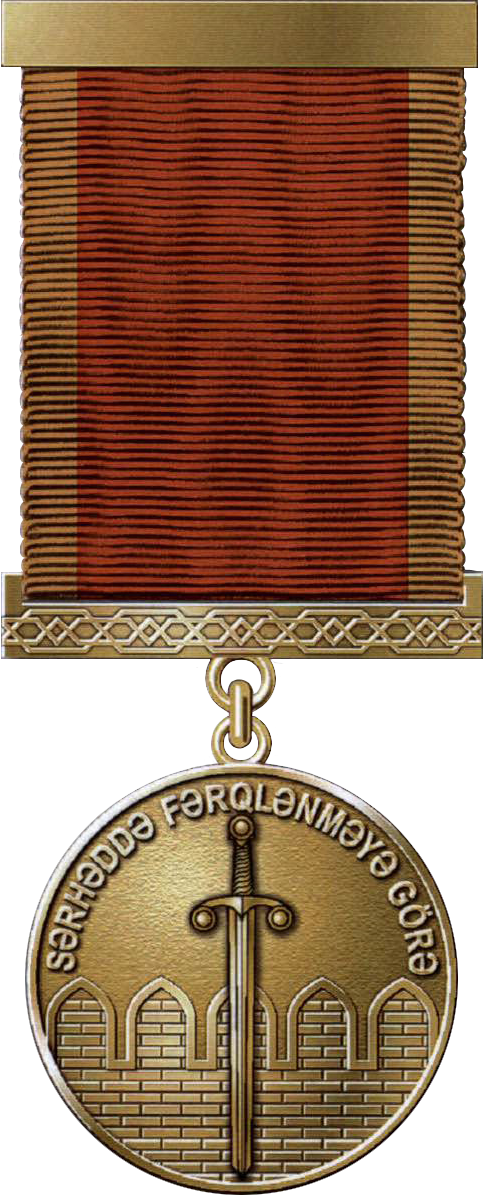

Medal for Distinction in the Border (“Sərhəddə fərqlənməyə görə” medalı) is a state award of the Republic of Azerbaijan awarded for distinguished service in protecting the state border.

== History ==
The award was established on December 6, 1993 by Law No. 760 by the former president of Azerbaijan Heydar Aliyev. The medal is awarded to specially distinguished servicemen of the Azerbaijani Border Troops and other persons for distinguished service in protecting the state border of the Republic of Azerbaijan.

== Description ==
The medal "For Distinction in the Border" consists of a bronze circular medal featuring a sword against the background of a fortress wall. Around the upper part is the inscription “Sərhəddə fərqlənməyə görə” (“For Distinction in the Border”). The medal's specifications were substantially updated by a law dated 30 September 2013. The diameter was changed from 35 mm to 36 mm, the ribbon dimensions and design were revised, and a bronze-colored plate was added to the upper part of the ribbon.

== The way of wearing ==
This medal is worn on the left side of the chest, after the Medal for Distinction in Military Service when other Azerbaijani state decorations are present.

== Recipients ==
- Zakir Hasanov
- Bakhish Bakhishli
- Nizami Gadirov
