= Pirşağı =

- Municipality
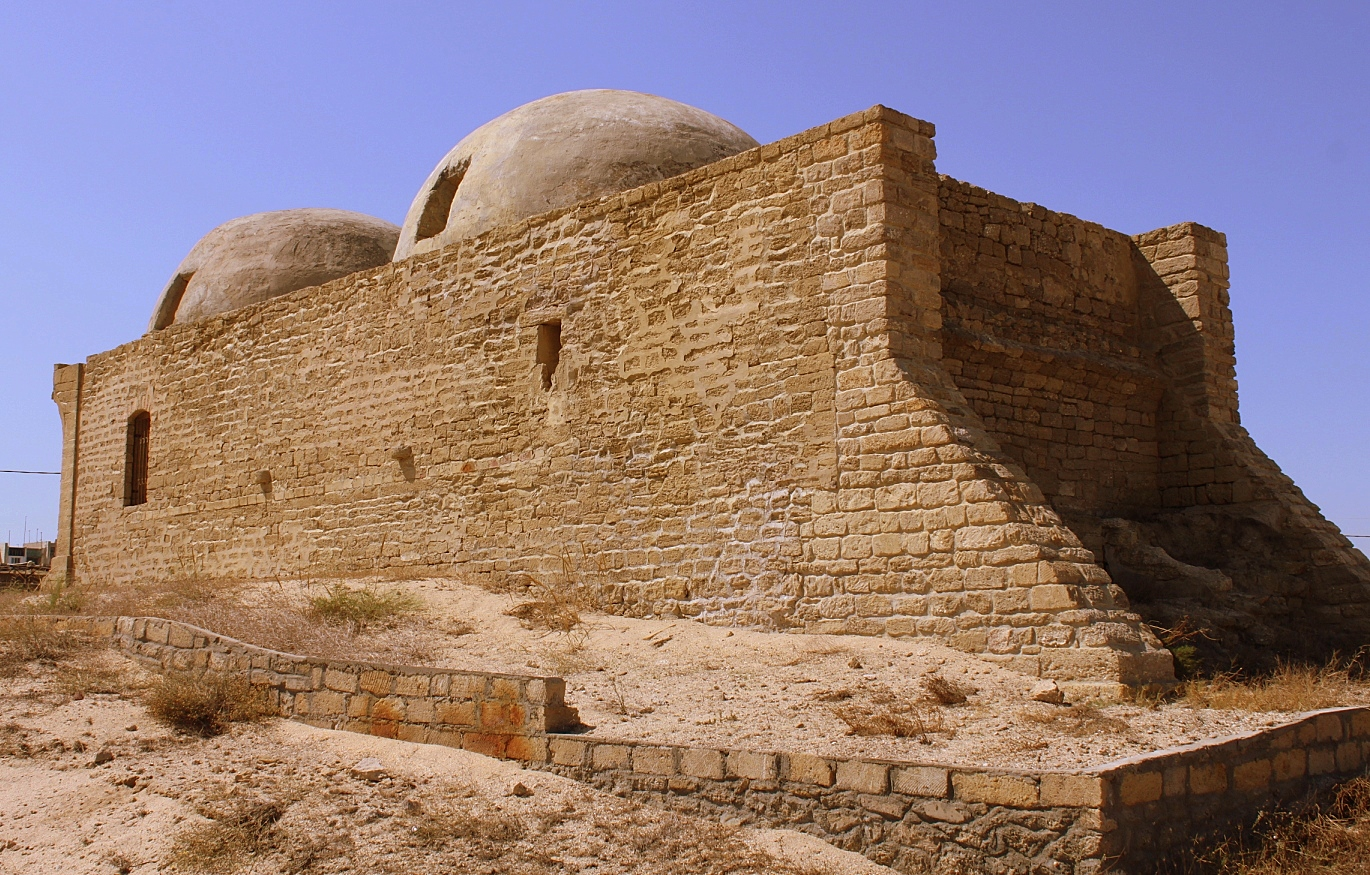
- The 19th century bathhouse Haji Verdi

- Location within Azerbaijan
- Coordinates: 40°33′39″N 49°53′21″E
- Country: Azerbaijan
- City: Baku
- District: Sabunçu

Population
  - Total: 4,826
- Time zone: UTC+4 (AZT)
  - Summer (DST): UTC+5 (AZT)

Pirşağı (also, Pirshaga and Pirshagi) is a settlement and municipality 34 km away from the railway station of Baku, Azerbaijan. Located on the northern coast of Absheron, it is in the Sabunchu district of Baku city. It is called Pirshagi (the shah of feasts) because it was initially a settlement where pilgrims gathered. A seaside resort, it is considered one of the most ancient settlements in Absheron. It has a population of 4,826.

== Main sights ==
Pirshagi is famous for its "gold dust" sandy beaches and its grapes and figs. There are many architectural monuments in Pirshagi, including a 19th-century mosque, an old bathhouse, and a pir called "Pirshagi tataz piri". The local climate and sand are considered to be curative, which explains why many members of the Azerbaijan elite have their summer residences in the city, including those of composer Gara Garayev, singer Bulbul, artist Elbey Rzaguliyev, actor Agasadikh Geraybeyli, and many others. Nowadays, the settlement attracts many vacationers from Azerbaijan and internationally each summer.

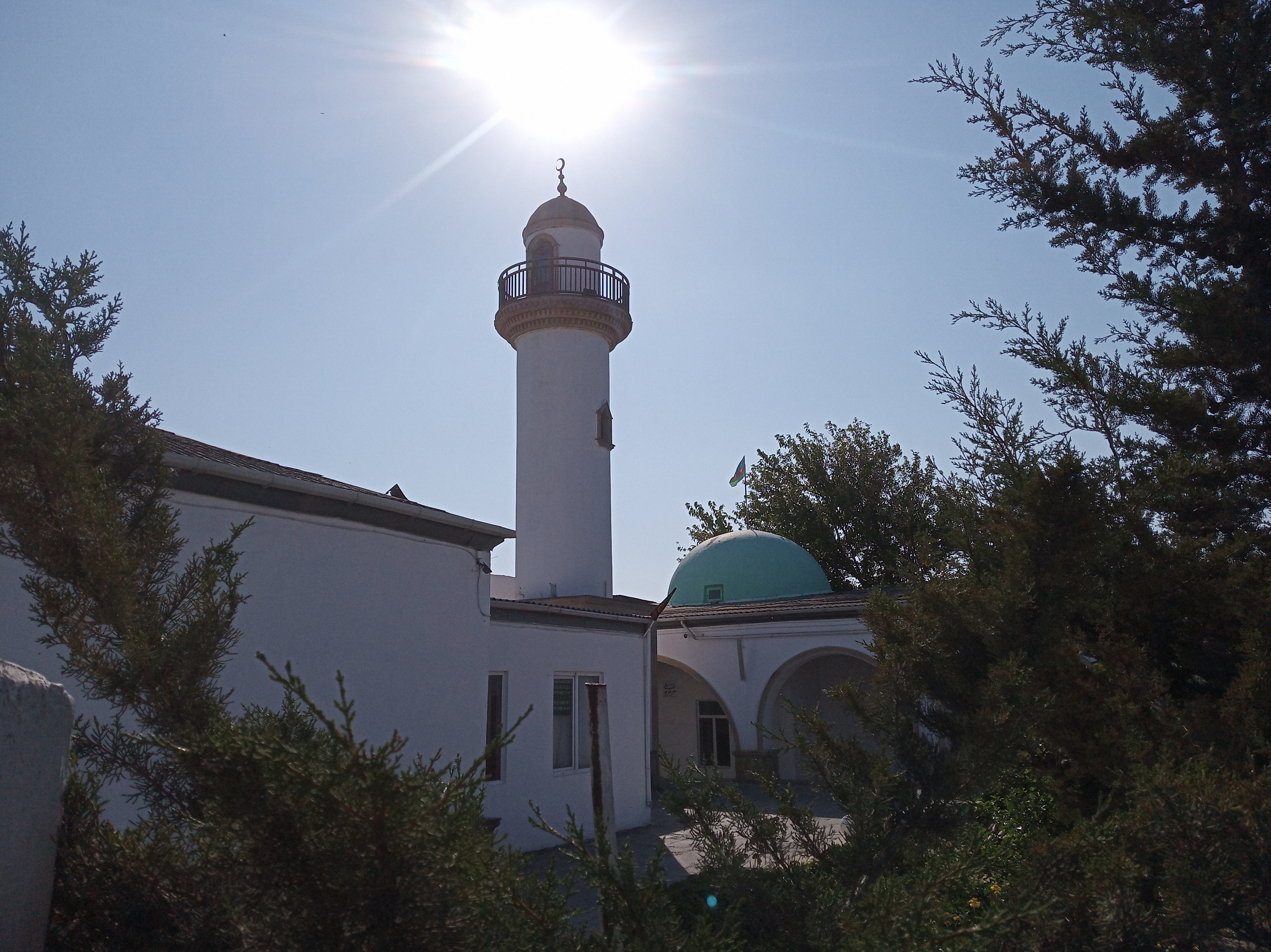
Mosque in Pirshagi

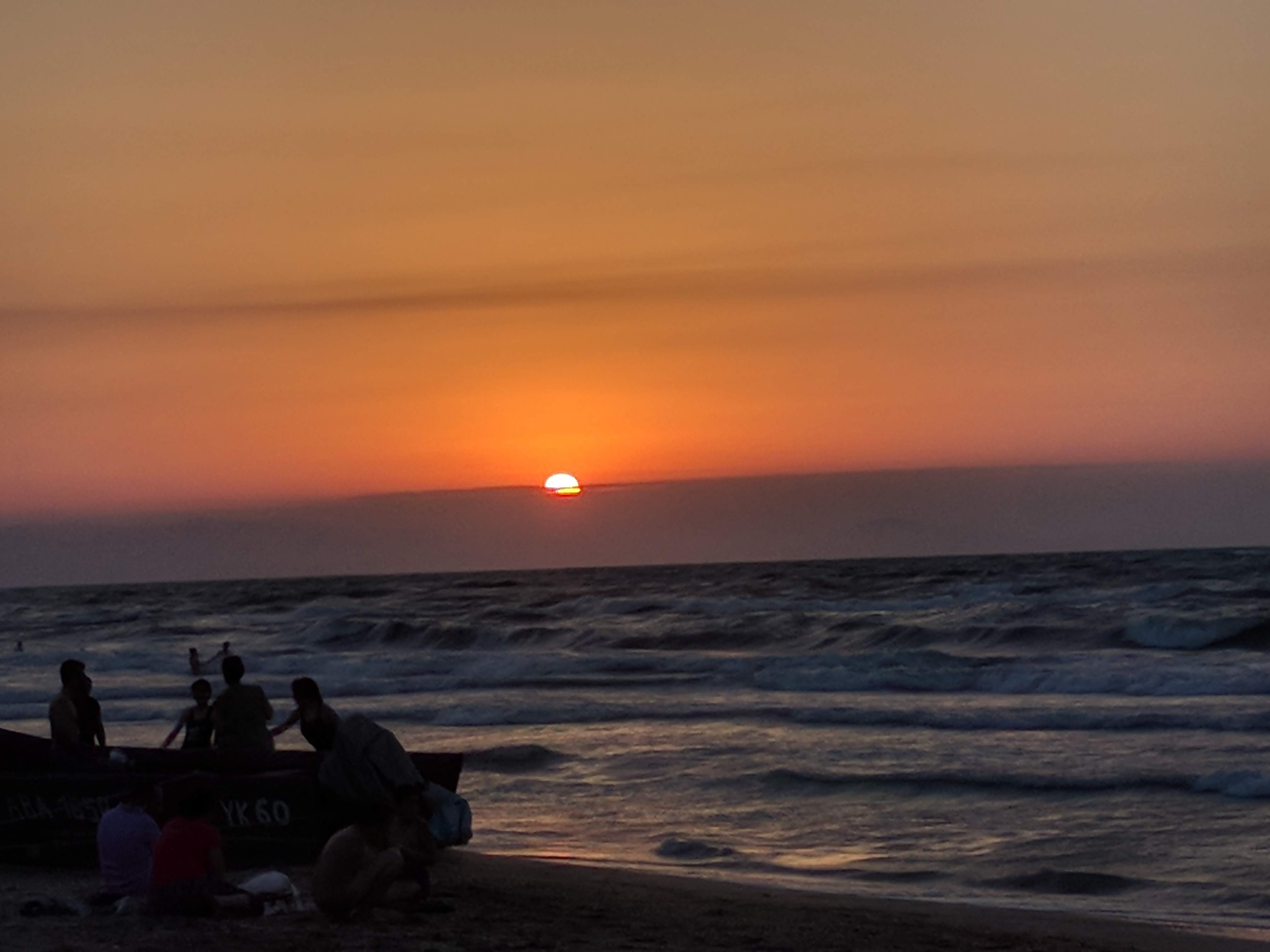
Pirshagi Seaside

== Transportation ==
Baku suburban railway

== See also ==
- Haji Abu-Salam Bath
