= Poladlı, Gobustan =

Poladlı
- Municipality
- Location within Azerbaijan
- Coordinates: 40°25′19″N 48°49′01″E
- Country: Azerbaijan
- Rayon: Gobustan

Population
  - Total: 1,465
- Time zone: UTC+4 (AZT)
  - Summer (DST): UTC+5 (AZT)

Poladlı (also, Poladly and Polatly) is a village and municipality in the Gobustan Rayon of Azerbaijan. It has a population of 1,465. The municipality consists of the villages of Poladlı and Dağ Kolanlı.
