= Horavar =

- Municipality
- Location within Azerbaijan
- Coordinates: 38°53′48″N 48°20′30″E
- Country: Azerbaijan
- Rayon: Yardymli

Population
  - Total: 820
- Time zone: UTC+4 (AZT)
  - Summer (DST): UTC+5 (AZT)

Horavar (also, Goravar and Gorovar) is a village and municipality in the Yardymli Rayon of Azerbaijan. It has a population of 820.
