= Sarıhacılı =

- Location within Azerbaijan Location within Karabakh Economic Region
- Coordinates: 39°59′16″N 46°53′57″E
- Country: Azerbaijan
- Rayon: Agdam
- Time zone: UTC+4 (AZT)
  - Summer (DST): UTC+5 (AZT)

Sarıhacılı (Armenian: Սարըջալը, also Saryjaly, Sarigadzhanly and Sarygadzhyly) was a village in the Agdam Rayon of Azerbaijan.

It is now a ghost town in the capital Agdam District of Azerbaijan. Founded in the early 19th century, it grew considerably during the Soviet period and had 28,031 inhabitants by 1989, now 0 as of 2021.
