= Sharaf Order =

Order of the Republic of Azerbaijan

Sharaf Order Şərəf ordeni
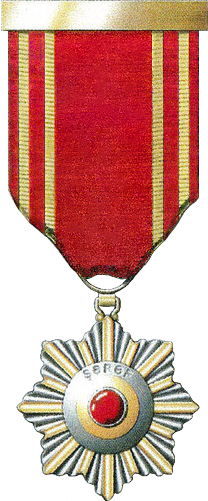
- Type: Individual award
- Awarded for: Special contributions in science, culture, literature, art, education, and the health sector
- Presented by: President of Azerbaijan
- Eligibility: Azerbaijani government's civilian personnel, citizens and non-citizens, foreign civilians
- Status: Active
- Established: 16 February 2007, by Decree No. 248-IIIQ

Precedence
- Next (higher): Heydar Aliyev Order; Istiglal Order; Shah Ismail OrderAzerbaijani Flag Order; Shohrat Order
- Next (lower): Dostlug Order, Order “For services to the Fatherland”

The Sharaf Order (Azerbaijani: "Şərəf" ordeni), translated as the Order of Honor, is an order of the Republic of Azerbaijan. It was ratified by Ilham Aliyev, the president of Azerbaijan, on 16 February 2007, by Decree No. 248-IIIQ.

== Status ==
The Sharaf Order of the Republic of Azerbaijan is given to citizens of Azerbaijan, foreign nationals, and non-citizens for the following services:

- special contributions to Azerbaijan
- special contributions to building Azerbaijani statehood
- special contributions to the economic, scientific, social, and cultural development
- special contributions in science, culture, literature, art, education, and the health sector

The Sharaf Order is pinned to the left side of the chest and if the recipient carries any other orders or medals of the Republic of Azerbaijan, the Sheref Order follows them. It is followed by the Heydar Aliyev Order, Istiglal Order, Shah Ismail Order, Azerbaijani Flag Order, Shohrat Order, and follows the Dostlug Order and the Order “For services to the Fatherland”.

== Elements ==
The order consists of an eight-pointed star, made of gold and platinum, mounted on a round plate. Two circles are built in the internal part of the plate, the external circle is made of platinum, and the internal circle is made of gold. The inscription “Sheref” is engraved on the platinum circumference. An imitation ruby is mounted in the center of the order. A decorative holder and loop ends are attached to the dark-red colored ribbon with parallel yellow lines. The rear side of the order is polished and has an engraved order number in the center. The order set includes:

- for hanging around the neck: dark-red colored ribbon with parallel yellow lines (width 27 mm) and the order (50 mm x 50 mm).
- for pinning to the chest: dark-red colored ribbon with parallel yellow lines (25 mm x 50 mm) and the order (35 mm x 35 mm).
- element for pinning to the chest: a plate covered with dark-red color and parallel yellow lines (1mm x 15 mm).
