= Medal for Distinction in Military Service =

- Type: Medal
- Country: Azerbaijan

Medal for Distinction in Military Service (Azerbaijani: "Hərbi xidmətdə fərqlənməyə görə" medalı) is a military award of the Republic of Azerbaijan.

== Description ==
The medal "For outstanding achievement in military service" consists of a round narrow plate cast from bronze spanning 35 mm in diameter with a white crescent and eight-pointed star on the ribbon. On the medal's obverse, another larger eight-pointed star appears with a smooth upper surface containing convex corners, a pair of spread eagle wings made with silver, crossed rifles also made with silver, and a black-colored anchor.

Surrounding the eight-pointed star shows relief rays found between the contours of its corners and the contours of the circle. The first "degree" of the medal has along the ring above the circle an inscription which reads "For Distinction in Military Service", with the star below, relief rays, and everything on the ring including itself in gold. The second and third "degrees" of the medal are designed the same except the former has the entire inner-circle (i.e., including the silver crossed rifles) in gold and the entire ring in silver except the black inscription, while the latter simply has the entire medal silver except the black inscription. The back side of the medal is smooth.

The medal attaches to a 27mm x 43mm rectangular olive drab ribbon with a collar and a ring attachment it connects to. Each "degree" of the medal has two 1 mm wide golden-colored vertical stripes along the edges of the ribbon. The middle of the ribbon has a 5 mm wide golden-colored vertical stripe for the first degree and, for the second and third degrees, two in addition three 2 mm stripes, respectively. The medal is accompanied by a 27mm x 9mm die with an element to be attached to clothing, covered with the same olive ribbon.
