= Jubilee medal "100 years of Heydar Aliyev (1923–2023)" =

Anniversary medal awarded to citizens of Azerbaijan

"Heydər Əliyevin 100 illiyi (1923–2023)" yubiley medalı
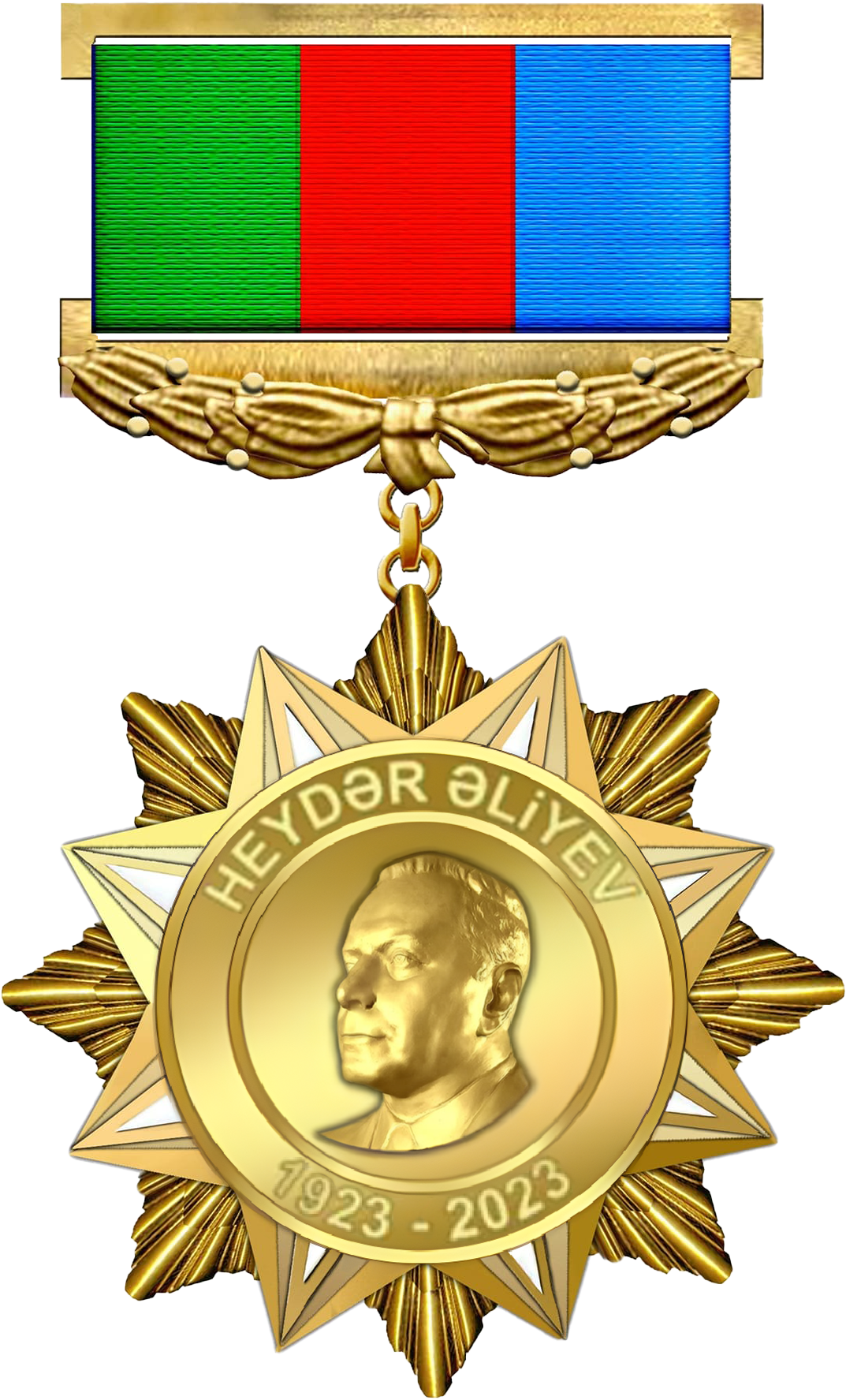
- Type: Medal
- Country: Azerbaijan

"Heydər Əliyevin 100 illiyi (1923–2023)" yubiley medalı - Jubilee medal "100th Anniversary of Heydar Aliyev (1923–2023)" - jubilee medal of the Republic of Azerbaijan. It was founded on April 11, 2023.

== History ==
The anniversary medal "100 years of Heydar Aliyev (1923–2023)" is awarded to citizens of the Republic of Azerbaijan, foreigners and stateless persons, state and other institutions of the Republic of Azerbaijan, representatives of foreign countries and international organizations. following:

- For his special services in researching and promoting the legacy of the National Leader of the Azerbaijani people, Heydar Aliyev;
- For his special services in the state building of the Republic of Azerbaijan, including the national liberation movement;
- For his services in realizing the idea of Azerbaijanism and strengthening the solidarity of world Azerbaijanis;
- For his services to the strengthening of peace and friendship among peoples and the development of international cooperation;
- For services contributing to the preservation and development of the state independence of the Republic of Azerbaijan, the progress and increase of the glory of Azerbaijan;
- For his services to the socio-economic, scientific-technical and cultural development of the Republic of Azerbaijan;
- For its effective activity in public administration, public service and social and political sphere.

The jubilee medal "100 years of Heydar Aliyev (1923–2023)" is worn on the left side of the chest, after other orders and medals of the Republic of Azerbaijan and before all medals.

== Description ==
The designation of the jubilee medal "100th Anniversary of Heydar Aliyev (1923–2023)" was approved by the Law of the Republic of Azerbaijan dated May 30, 2023.

=== General description of the medal ===
"100th Anniversary of Heydar Aliyev (1923–2023)" Jubilee Medal of the Republic of Azerbaijan consists of two octagonal stars with a total diameter of 42 mm, placed one above the other, made of non-ferrous metal of special composition. For cold stamping, which will be coated with a layer of 999.9 carat gold.

=== Obverse of the medal ===
On the front of the medal, there is an eight-pointed star, each corner of which is decorated with relief lines, and an eight-pointed star whose corners are decorated with white enamel. Above the white enamel eight-pointed star is a circular plate with a diameter of 26 mm, surrounded by outer and inner circles. Between the outer and inner circles, HAYDAR ALİYEV is written along the upper arc, and the numbers 1923–2023 are written along the lower arc.

Inside the inner circle, a relief of Heydar Aliyev is engraved in the center.

All elements and inscriptions are raised in relief in gold.

=== Reverse of the medal ===
The back of the medal has a smooth surface.

The medal's series and number are located at the bottom of the back of the medal.

=== Elements of the medal ===
The medal is mounted on a smooth gold plate measuring 34.5 mm × 1.5 mm at the top and 34.5 mm × 7.5 mm at the bottom, with an element for fastening to the collar of the dress, on which is engraved a wreath of laurel leaves. It is attached to the band by means of two rings and a ring, 31.5 mm × 15 mm × 31.5 mm × 15 mm.

On the black band there are green, red and blue vertical stripes, each 10.5 mm wide, reflecting the colors of the State Flag of the Republic of Azerbaijan.

The medal is fitted with a 31.5mm × 9mm die, covered with the same black ribbon, with an element to be attached to the collar of the dress.
