= For Heroism Medal =

Military medal of Azerbaijan

"For Heroism" Medal
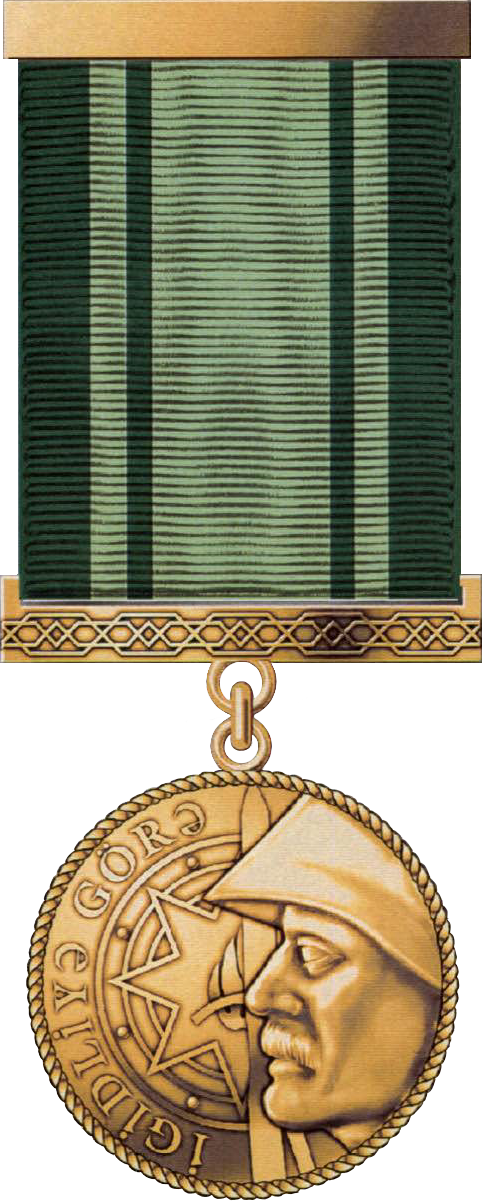
- Type: Individual Award
- Country: Azerbaijan
- Presented by: President of Azerbaijan
- Clasps: 1
- Status: Active
- Ribbon bar of the medal

Precedence
- Next (higher): "For Motherland" Medal
- Next (lower): Tereggi Medal

The "For heroism" Medal (Azerbaijani: "İgidliyə görə" medalı) is a medal of Azerbaijan.

== Description ==
There is an in-profile picture of a soldier with a helmet on head and a bayonet in hand against the background of an eight-pointed star. "For heroism" inscription is carved along a circle to the left side of the soldier. The inscription and picture are salient.

The reverse side of the medal is flat and a number of the medal is carved in its center. The medal is attached to a thin rectangular plate, which is covered with a 27 mm X 43 mm dark and light green ribbon, with an eye ring. There is a rectangular block with national ornaments on the bottom and an element for pinning it to the chest on the reverse side of the medal.

== See also ==
- Orders, decorations, and medals of Azerbaijan
