= Baku State University Law School =

Faculty of law in Azerbaijan

Baku State University Law School (Azerbaijani: Bakı Dövlət Universitetinin Hüquq fakültəsi) is one of the 16 schools (or facilities) of Baku State University.

== History ==
According to the directions of Azerbaijan C (b)P in 1927 under the decision of administrative personnel of Azerbaijan State University and State Scientific Board of Public Education Commissariat of the Republic, the branch of law was made inside the Oriental Studies department of the University. In 1928, the Branch of law changed into the Faculty of Law. The School of Law has an old history and educated thousands of lawyers.

== International cooperation ==
The school has international cooperation with universities like Ankara University, Selcuk University, Moscow State University, Wurzburg University, GWU Law School and many others.

== Departments ==
- Department of Theory and History of Law
- Department of Constitutional Law
- Department of Civil Law
- Department of Civil Procedure and Commercial Law
- Department of Criminal Law
- Department of Public International Law
- "Unesco" Department of Human Rights and Information Law
- Department of Criminal Procedure
- Department of Private International and European Law
- Department of Labor and Social Security Law

== Administration and student population ==
The school has more than 100 academic personnel; currently it has 2183 students enrolled during the 2022-23 year.

The dean is Prof. Amir Aliyev.
