= Shah Ismail Order =

Shah Ismail Order "Şah İsmayıl" ordeni
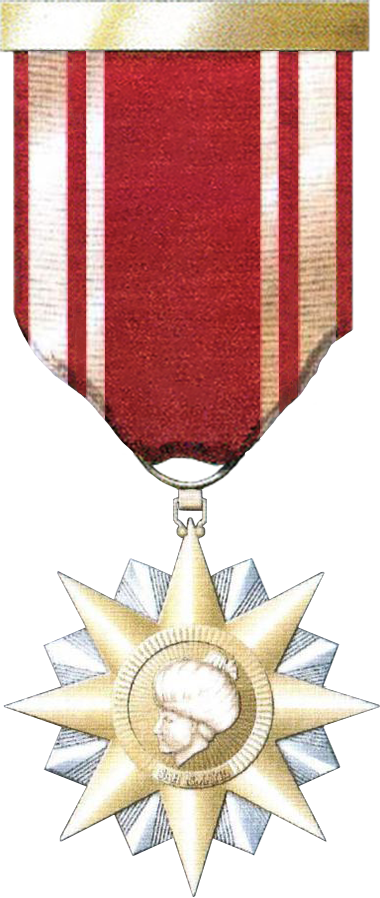
- Type: Individual award
- Awarded for: services in organization of development and strengthening of Azerbaijani Armed Forces, distinguished acts in defending the territorial integrity of Azerbaijan Republic, distinguished courage in the military, special contributions in eliminating emergency situations in the country
- Description: eight-pointed star with an engraved image of Shah Ismail
- Presented by: President of Azerbaijan
- Eligibility: high-ranking officers of Azerbaijani Armed Forces and commanders of military units and establishments
- Clasps: 1
- Status: Active
- Established: 10 November 1992

Precedence
- Next (higher): Istiglal Order
- Next (lower): Azerbaijani Flag Order

Shah Ismail Order (Azerbaijani: Şah İsmayıl ordeni) is an Azerbaijani military award presented by the Commander-in-chief and President of the Republic of Azerbaijan.

== History and status ==
Shah Ismail Order was among several medals and orders, requested to be reviewed and created by then President Abulfaz Elchibey on November 10, 1992, by Presidential Decree No. 370. The order was created by Decree No. 755 of the President of Azerbaijan, Heydar Aliyev, and ratified by the National Assembly of Azerbaijan on December 6, 1993. The Shah Ismail Order is given to the high-ranking officers of Azerbaijani Armed Forces for rendering the following services:

- special contributions in organization of development and strengthening of Azerbaijani Armed Forces;
- distinguished acts in defending the territorial integrity of Azerbaijan Republic;
- distinguished courage in the military;
- special contributions in eliminating emergency situations in the country.

The order is pinned to the left side of the chest. If there are any other orders or medals, the Shah Ismail Order follows Istiglal Order (Azerbaijani: Istiqlal Ordeni; Order of Sovereignty).

== Description ==
Shah Ismail Order is made of two layers. The bottom silver layer is in the shape of eight-pointed star. The smaller top layer is an octagon plate bathed in pure gold with a depiction of a side-view image of Shah Ismayil Safavi. The rear side of the order is polished and has an engraved order number and words Şah İsmayıl. The composition is attached to a red colored watered silk ribbon bar with five edges. The order comes in size 27 mm (1.1 in) by 47.5 mm (1.87 in), the ribbon bar - 27 mm (1.1 in) by 9 mm (0.35 in).

=== Previous version ===
The previous description was quite different from the current version of the order. The order was round shaped and the edges were made from pure gold. The center of the order was in the shape of a shield and was colored with blue color. The image of Shah Ismail was depicted in the center of the shield with words Şah İsmayıl written right below the picture. The shield was placed on diagonally crossed sword and mace. The size was 57 mm (2.2 in) by 43 mm (1.7 in).
