= Istiglal Order =

Civil order of Azerbaijan

Istiglal Order Istiqlal ordeni
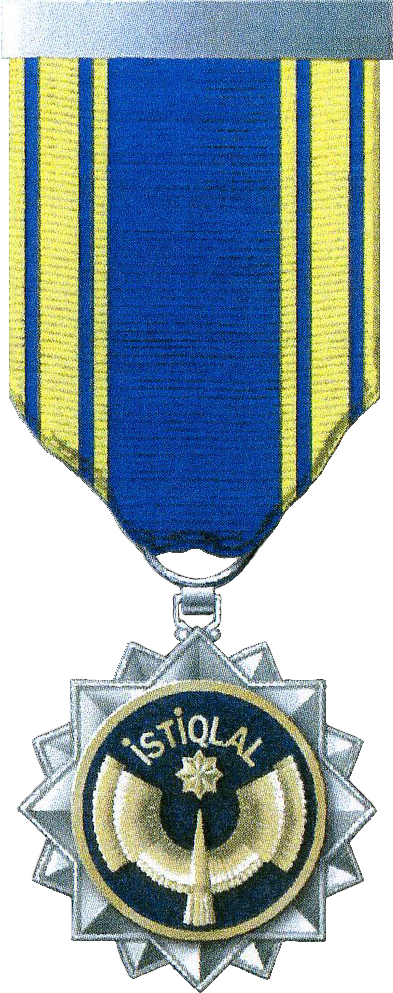
- Istiglal Order medal
- Type: Individual Award
- Awarded for: exceptional contributions to national independence movement of Azerbaijan, distinguished services to republic and people of Azerbaijan, special contributions in statehood building of the country
- Description: two layers of eight-pointed stars with an engraved image of a bird with stretching wings
- Presented by: President of Azerbaijan
- Eligibility: Citizens of Azerbaijan and non-citizens who made special contributions
- Clasps: 1
- Status: Active
- Established: December 6, 1993 (Decree No. 754), revised on February 6, 1998
- First award: 15 April 1995

Highlights
- Total recipients: 73
- Ribbon of the order

Precedence
- Next (higher): Karabakh Order
- Next (lower): Shah Ismail Order

Istiglal Order (Azerbaijani: Istiqlal ordeni), is the highest supreme order of the Republic of Azerbaijan, along with Heydar Aliyev Order, presented by the president of Azerbaijan. Istiglal translates to sovereignty in Azerbaijani.

== History and status ==
Istiglal Order was among several medals and orders, requested to be reviewed and created by President Abulfaz Elchibey on November 10, 1992 by Presidential Decree No. 370. The order was created by Decree No. 754 of the president of Azerbaijan, Heydar Aliyev, and ratified by the National Assembly of Azerbaijan on December 6, 1993. The Istiglal Order is given to the Citizens of Azerbaijan for the following services:

- for exceptional contributions to national independence movement of Azerbaijan;
- distinguished services to Motherland and its people;
- special contributions in statehood building of the country.

The order is pinned to the left side of the chest. If there are any other orders or medals, they are to follow Istiglal Order.

== Description ==
Istiglal order is made of two silver layers of eight pointed stars placed on each other in proportion to symmetrical axis. The top one is colored with blue color and has an image of a bird with stretched wings. Between the wings, an eight pointed star with a word İstiqlal (Sovereignty) on top of it is engraved. The bird, star and "Istiglal" words engravements are in pure gold. The rear side of the order is polished and has an engraved order number. The composition is attached to a blue colored watered silk ribbon bar with five edges. The order comes in size 27 mm (1.1 in) by 47.5 mm (1.87 in), the ribbon bar – 27 mm (1.1 in) by 9 mm (0.35 in).

== Recipients ==
- Alibaba Mammadov, Azerbaijani Mugam singer
- Habil Aliyev, prominent Azerbaijani kamancheh player
- Khalil Rza Uluturk, Azerbaijani poet
- Mammad Araz, Azerbaijani poet
- Bakhtiyar Vahabzadeh, Azerbaijani poet
- Mirvarid Dilbazi, Azerbaijani poet
- Mikayil Abdullayev, Azerbaijani painter
- Anar Rzayev, Azerbaijani novelist and poet
- Lutfiyar Imanov, Azerbaijani opera singer
- Jalal Aliyev, member of National Assembly of Azerbaijan
- Arif Malikov, Azerbaijani composer
- Murtuz Alasgarov, former Speaker of the National Assembly of Azerbaijan
- Tahir Salahov, Azerbaijani painter
- Ziya Bunyadov, prominent Azerbaijani historian
- Leyla Badirbeyli, Azerbaijani actress
- Süleyman Demirel, former president of Turkey
- Leonid Kuchma, former president of Ukraine
- Allahshukur Pashazadeh, Sheikh ul-Islam and Grand Mufti of the Caucasus
- Amina Dilbazi, Azerbaijani folk dancer
- Khoshbakht Yusifzadeh, prominent Azerbaijani geologist
- Eduard Shevardnadze, former president of Georgia
- İhsan Doğramacı, Turkish academician
- Togrul Narimanbekov, Azerbaijani painter
- Mstislav Rostropovich, Russian cellist
- Muslim Magomayev, Soviet and Azerbaijani baritone operatic and pop singer
- Elchin Efendiyev, Azerbaijani writer, Deputy Prime Minister of Azerbaijan
- Ion Iliescu, President of Romania
- Nabi Khazri, Azerbaijani writer
- Polad Bülbüloğlu, Azerbaijani singer, actor and politician
- Artur Rasizade, Prime Minister of Azerbaijan
- Fahd of Saudi Arabia, King of Saudi Arabia
- Magsud Ibrahimbeyov, Azerbaijani writer and member of National Assembly of Azerbaijan
- Vasif Adigozalov, Azerbaijani composer
- Nikolai Baibakov, Russian statesman and economist
- Abbas Abbasov, former Deputy Prime Minister of Azerbaijan
- Zeynab Khanlarova, Azerbaijani folk singer
- Arif Babayev, Azerbaijani Mugam singer
- Ramiz Mehdiyev, professor and Head of Presidential Administration of Azerbaijan Republic
- Fidan Gasimova, Azerbaijani Opera singer
- Shafiga Mammadova, Azerbaijani cinema and theatre actress
