= Heydar Aliyev Order =

Heydar Aliyev Order "Heydər Əliyev" ordeni
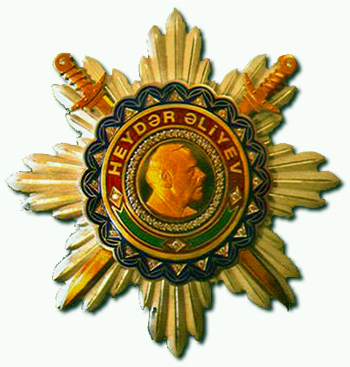
- Type: Individual Award
- Presented by: President of Azerbaijan
- Clasps: 1
- Status: Currently constituted
- Established: 22 April 2005 (Decree No. 896-IIQ)
- First award: 28 April 2005 (Azerbaijan) İlham Aliyev
- Final award: 18 February 2026 (Azerbaijan) Nariman Hasanzade

Highlights
- Total: 28

Precedence
- Next (higher): no
- Equivalent: no
- Next (lower): Zafar Order

The Heydar Aliyev Order (Azerbaijani: "Heydər Əliyev" ordeni) is the highest state award of the Republic of Azerbaijan. The order was ratified by legislation of the Azerbaijan Republic by Decree No. 896-IIQ on 22 April 2005. It is named after former president Heydar Aliyev.

The order is given to the citizens of the Republic of Azerbaijan for special contributions to the prosperity, greatness, and glory of Azerbaijan and for courage and bravery displayed in defense of the Motherland and state interests of the Azerbaijan Republic. The Order is given to the President of Azerbaijan according to status.

== Foreign nationals ==
The Heydar Aliyev Order is given to foreign nationals for the following services:

- special contributions to Azerbaijan;
- special contributions to implementation work of Azerbaijani idea, strengthening solidarity of Azerbaijanis in the whole world;
- special contributions to mending of political, economic, scientific, and cultural fences of Azerbaijan with other countries;
- star and chain with the image of sword are assigned to the Heydar Aliyev Order in accordance with paragraph No.32 of clause No. 109 the Constitution of Azerbaijan Republic (it falls within the competence of the President).

It is pinned to the left side of the chest. If there are any other orders and medals, the Heydar Aliyev Order follows them.

== Description ==
The order includes the star, symbol, and the order chain. Two variants of the star and the chain are made-with and without the sword. It is made of 525 carat bronze weighing 533,29 grams, 999 carat silver weighing 3,89 grams, 750 carat gold weighing 57,42 grams, 999 carat gold weighing 6,42 grams, 8 brilliants weighing 0,83 carats, 224 brilliants weighing 5,34 carats, 67 brilliants weighing 1 carat (total number of used brilliants is 299).

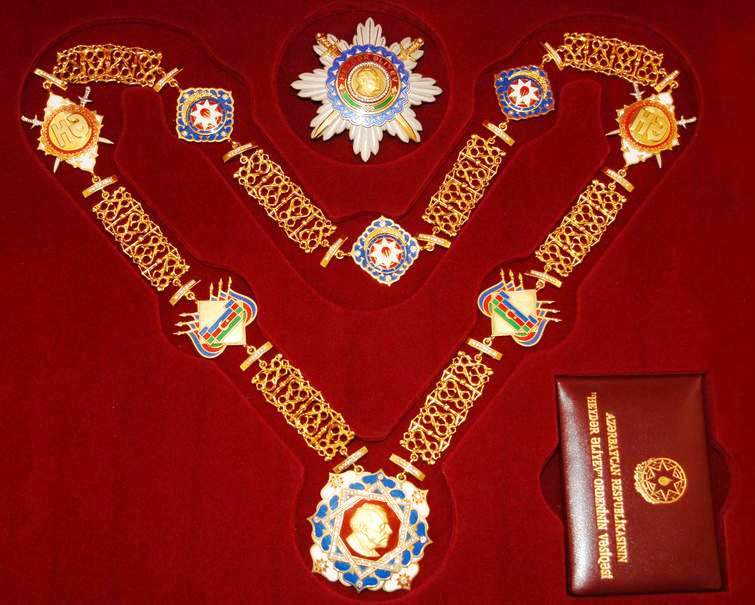
Star, medal and certificate of Heydar Aliyev Order

Eight-pointed star of the order, provided to be worn on the chest, is made of silver. The ends of the star are made in the form of flower petals. The distance between the opposite ends of the star is 82 mm. A plate with a wavy circle is placed on the surface of the star. This plate on the star with sword is mounted on two crossed swords passing through the four ends of the star. The swords are made of silver colored with gold. Each sword's length is 82 mm and width is 4 mm. A brilliant is mounted on the handle of each sword. A bas-relief of Heydar Aliyev is portrayed on a round medallion located on a polished plate, which is located on the plate with wavy circles. The medallion is made of 750 carat gold. The medallion is surrounded by an inner ring with 42 brilliants on it. Aliyev's name is written with golden letters on the top of a middle ring covered with red enamel and surrounding the inner ring. The bottom of the middle ring is adorned with three brilliants within a diamond-shaped ornament; there are two arched stripes covered with green enamel between them. The middle ring is surrounded by the external blue-colored ring with wavy circles; 20 brilliants are mounted on it within triangular engravings.

The order's badge, which is worn around the neck and hangs down the chest, consists of a base with a rectangular ornament covered with white enamel. Brilliants are mounted on elements of the ornament made in the forms of stars covered with red enamel. The rectangular ornament covered with blue enamel is located on the surface of the base. Brilliants are mounted to each of the four ends of the ornament. The base and the ornament located on it are made of silver colored with gold. A plate made of 750-carat gold is mounted to the central part of the badge. The plate is colored with dark red color. The bas-relief of Heydar Aliyev made of 750 carat gold is located in the center of the plate. The bas-relief is surrounded by a frame of a regular geometric shape in the form of two crossed squares. 112 brilliants are mounted on the surface of the squares. The frame is made of silver colored with gold. The badge’s height is 67 mm, and the width is-67 mm. The chain of the order consists of 15 elements, arranged in a certain order. These elements are:

- Two decorative plates located to the left and right of the chain, consisting of crossed flags covered with blue, red, and green enamels. National Flag of Azerbaijan Republic is located in the center of the plates.
- Two quadrangular ornaments located to the left and right of the chain covered with white enamel. A medallion surrounded by an ornament covered with red enamel is located in the center. A monogram with the initials of Heydar Aliyev is located in the center. Two crossed swords are located on the chain with the sword, under the medallion.
- Three plates with the image of the national emblem of Azerbaijan are located to the left, right, and on the top of the chain.

Mentioned elements are mounted to the large chain with plates decorated with 112 brilliants (16 plates with 7 brilliants on each). The rear side of the order is polished and has an engraved order number and an element to wear it on.

== Recipients ==
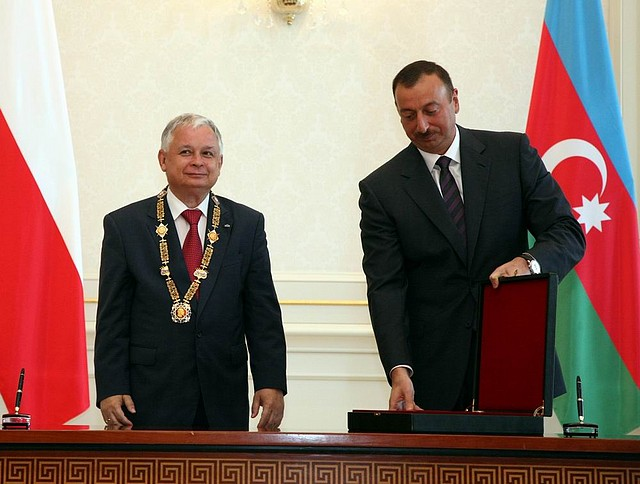
President İlham Aliyev presented the order to Former Polish President Lech Kaczyński, 2 July 2009

The order is awarded rarely. The following persons were awarded the order until the beginning of 03.09.2014:

1. Azerbaijan : İlham Aliyev - (President of Republic of Azerbaijan) - 28.04.2005.
2. Turkey : İhsan Doğramacı - (Turkish doctor-pediatrician, public figure) - 29.04.2005.
3. France : Jacques Chirac - (President of France) - 29.01.2007.
4. Russia : Mstislav Rostropovich - (Russian cellist and conductor) - 27.03.2007.
5. Ukraine : Viktor Yushchenko - (President of Ukraine) - 22.05.2008.
6. Azerbaijan : Tahir Salahov - (Azerbaijani painter and draughtsman) 27.11.2008.
7. Kuwait : Jaber Al-Ahmad Al-Jaber Al-Sabah - (Emir and thirteenth Sheikh of Kuwait) - 14.06.2009.
8. Poland : Lech Kaczyński - (President of Poland) - 02.07.2009.
9. Latvia : Valdis Zatlers - (President of Latvia) - 10.08.2009.
10. Romania : Traian Băsescu - (President of Romania) - 18.04.2011.
11. Bulgaria : Georgi Parvanov - (President of Bulgaria) - 14.11.2011.
12. Tajikistan : Emomalii Rahmon - (President of Tajikistan) - 11.07.2012.
13. Azerbaijan : Arif Malikov - (Azerbaijani and Soviet composer) - 13.09.2013.
14. Turkey : Abdullah Gül - (11th President of Turkey) - 12.11.2013.
15. Ukraine : Viktor Yanukovych - (President of Ukraine) - 17.11.2013.
16. Turkey : Recep Tayyip Erdoğan - (12th President of Turkey) - 03.09.2014.
17. Azerbaijan : Mehriban Aliyeva - (Chairman of the Organizing Committee of the First European Games "Baku-2015") - 29.06.2015.
18. Belarus : Alexander Lukashenko - (President of Belarus) - 28.11.2016.
19. Azerbaijan : Zeynab Khanlarova - (People's Artist of the USSR and Azerbaijan) - 26.12.2016.
20. Kazakhstan : Nursultan Nazarbayev - (President of Kazakhstan) - 03.04.2017.
21. Italy : Sergio Mattarella - (President of Italy) - 18.07.2018.
22. Azerbaijan : Ramiz Mehdiyev - (President of the Azerbaijan National Academy of Sciences) - 23.10.2019.
23. Azerbaijan : Khoshbakht Yusifzadeh - (First Vice-President of the State Oil Company of Azerbaijan Republic) - 13.01.2020.
24. Azerbaijan : Polad Bülbüloğlu - (Ambassador of Azerbaijan to Russia) - 03.02.2020.
25. Azerbaijan : Artur Rasizade - (6th Prime Minister of Azerbaijan) - 20.02.2025.
26. Kyrgyzstan: Sadyr Japarov - (6th president of Kyrgyzstan ) - 31.07.2026.
