= Azerbaijani Flag Order =

Azerbaijani Flag Order Azərbaycan Bayrağı Ordeni
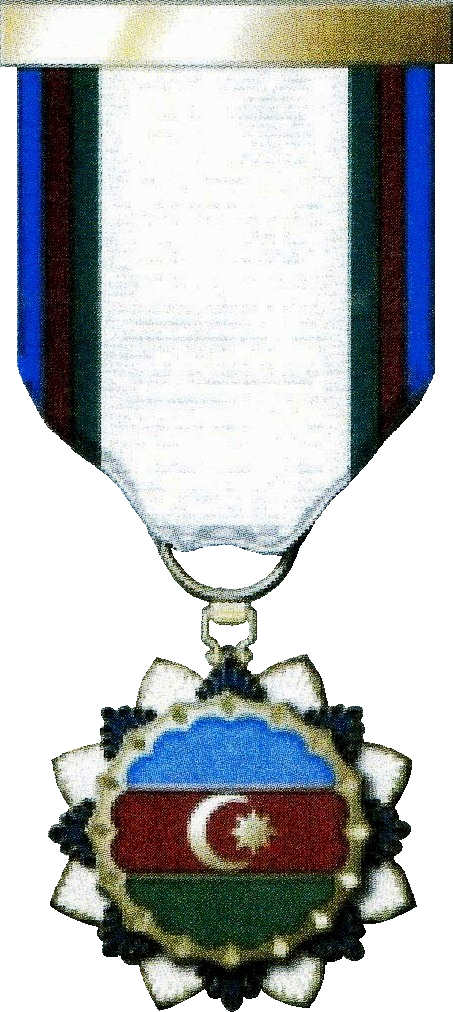
- Azerbaijani Flag Order medal (since 2009)
- Type: Individual Award
- Awarded for: sustained, selfless service of the highest order, long lasting contributions to restoration of independence of Azerbaijan, development and progress in economic, scientific, socio-political fields, distinguished acts in defending the territorial integrity of Azerbaijan Republic, service in keeping the order in the republic, protecting borders of the country and distinguished military service
- Description: eight-pointed star with an engraved Azerbaijani flag insignia
- Presented by: President of Azerbaijan
- Eligibility: Azerbaijani government's civilian personnel, citizens and non-citizens, foreign civilians
- Clasps: 1
- Status: Active
- Established: December 6, 1993 (Decree No. 756), revised on February 6, 1998
- Ribbon bar of the order (since 2009)

Precedence
- Next (higher): Shah Ismail Order
- Next (lower): Rashadat Order

Azerbaijani Flag Order (Azerbaijani: Azərbaycan Bayrağı Ordeni) is an award presented by the President of the Republic of Azerbaijan.

== History and status ==
Azerbaijani Flag order was among several medals and orders, requested to be reviewed and created by the President Abulfaz Elchibey on November 10, 1992 by Presidential Decree No. 370. The order was created by Decree No. 756 of President Heydar Aliyev and ratified by the National Assembly of Azerbaijan on December 6, 1993. The Azerbaijani Flag Order is given to the citizens of Republic of Azerbaijan, foreign nationals and non-citizens for the following services:

- long lasting contributions to restoration of independence of Azerbaijan;
- special contributions to the social and political development;
- distinguished contributions to the military science and development of military equipment;
- distinguished acts in defending the territorial integrity of Azerbaijan Republic;
- distinguished service in keeping the order in the country;
- protecting borders of the country and distinguished military service.

The order is pinned to the left side of the chest. If there are any other orders or medals, the Azerbaijani Flag Order follows Shah Ismail Order (Azerbaijani: Şah İsmayıl Ordeni; Order of Shah Ismail).

== Description ==
Azerbaijani Flag order is made of two layers of silver plates in the form of eight pointed stars bathed in pure gold, with composition of national ornaments. The bottom layer is colored in white and the top one is colored in blue stripes. The striped come towards the center, onto another layer depicted in form of Azerbaijani flag, colored in its blue, red and green colors. The rear side of the order is polished and has an engraved order number and words Azərbaycan Bayrağı.

The composition is attached to a blue-red-green colored watered silk ribbon bar with five edges. The order comes in size 27 mm (1.1 in) by 47.5 mm (1.87 in), the ribbon bar - 27 mm (1.1 in) by 9 mm (0.35 in).

== Recipients ==
- Zakir Garalov, General Prosecutor of Azerbaijan
- Kamaladdin Heydarov, Minister of Emergency Situations of Azerbaijan
- Servicemen of Azerbaijani Armed Forces
- Servicemen of the Ministry of National Security of Azerbaijan Republic
- Ibad Huseynov, National Hero of Azerbaijan
- Aziz Seyidov, Justice of Supreme Court of Azerbaijan
- Ramil Usubov, Minister of Internal Affairs of Azerbaijan
- Eldar Mahmudov, Minister of National Security
- Shahin Sultanov, Commander of the Azerbaijani Navy
- Tofig Aghahuseynov, Commander of the Baku Air Defense District
- Kamran Aliyev, Prosecutor General of the Republic of Azerbaijan
