= Yengica =

Yengica or Yengidzhe or may refer to:

- Sisavan, Armenia
- Yengidzha, Armenia
- Yengica, Qabala, Azerbaijan
- Yengicə, Azerbaijan

== See also ==
- Yengidzha (disambiguation)
