= Yengidzha =

Yengidzha or Yenidzha may refer to:

- Yengidzha, Armenia
- Sisavan, Armenia
- Yengica, Qabala, Azerbaijan
- Yengicə, Azerbaijan
- Yenicə, Agdash, Azerbaijan
- Yenicə, Yevlakh, Azerbaijan
- Ərəbyengicə, Azerbaijan
- Yengidzha, Iran
