= Yengija bath =

- Azerbaijani: Yengicə hamam
- Interactive map of the Yengija bath area

General information
- Type: Bath
- Architectural style: Azerbaijani architecture
- Location: Yengicə, Sharur, Nakhchivan Autonomous Republic
- Coordinates: 39°32′48″N 44°57′40″E
- Completed: XVIII century

Yengija bath is a historical architectural monument located in Yengija village of Sharur region.

The monument functioned as a bathhouse until the 80s of the 20th century. It was renovated in 2018. It is currently not being used for its original purpose.

== About ==
The bath was built at the end of the 18th century by Tovuz Khanum from Shahtakht. The total area of the rectangular bath is 650 square meters. The building was built using baked bricks and lime measuring 19x19x5 cm. The bath building is divided into two octagonal halls and two auxiliary rooms adjacent to them. The hearth of the bathhouse is located in the south of the building. The doors of the auxiliary rooms located between the two halls open to the washroom. The bathroom is heated through hot air ducts placed under the floor. The building was lit by a chimney located in the center of the dome and small windows opened in the walls.

Yengija bath operated until the 80s of the 20th century. Later, due to disuse and lack of maintenance, the building of the bath fell into disrepair and fell into disrepair.

The building of the bathhouse was restored from March 2017 to September 2018. Currently, it is not used as a bathroom. In the historical building, service was organized in 7 different areas.
