= Gazanaler =

Mountain in Armenia

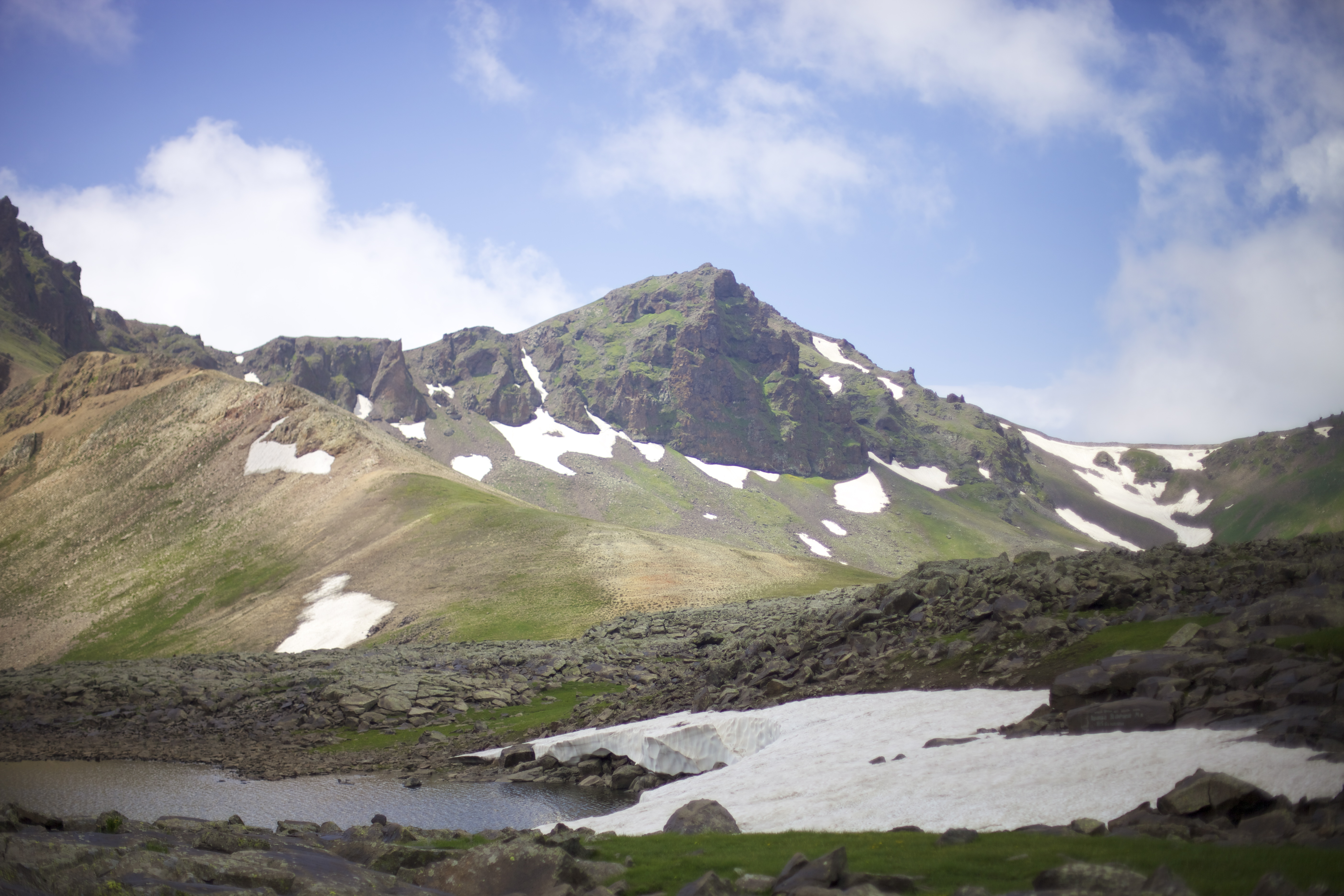

Highest point
- Elevation: 3,829 m (12,562 ft)
- Coordinates: 39°11′44″N 45°59′00″E

Naming
- Native name: Գազանալեռ (Armenian)

Geography
- Location within Armenia Location within Azerbaijan
- Location: Armenia; Azerbaijan
- Parent range: Armenian Highlands

Gazanaler (Armenian: Գազանալեռ, lit. 'beast mountain'; Azerbaijani: Qazangöldağ) is a mountain in the Zangezur Mountains range of the Armenian Highlands. The mountain rises 3,829 metres (12,562 ft) and is situated between the border of Armenian province of Syunik and the Nakhchivan Autonomous Republic.

== See also ==
- Mount Kaputjugh
