= Teyvaz =

- Municipality
- Location within Azerbaijan
- Coordinates: 39°15′19″N 45°46′17″E
- Country: Azerbaijan
- Autonomous republic: Nakhchivan
- District: Julfa

Population (2005)
  - Total: 350
- Time zone: UTC+4 (AZT)

Teyvaz is a village and municipality in the Julfa District of Nakhchivan, Azerbaijan. It is located 57 km in the north from the district center, on the right bank of the Alinjachay River, on the slope of the Zangezur ridge. Its population is busy with farming and animal husbandry. There are secondary school, club, library, kindergarten and a medical center in the village. It has a population of 350.

== Etymology ==
According to some researchers, the name of the village derives from the words taipa (wide) and az (valley) from ancient Turkic languages, meaning "the founded settlement in the vast valley located between the big watershed, hills and rivers".
