= Sayavush Hasanov =

Azerbaijanian soldier and construction worker (1964-1992)

- Sayavush Hasan oglu Hasanov
- Sayavush Hasanov - National Hero of Azerbaijan
- Born: 20 January 1964; Yengicə, Nakhchivan AR, Azerbaijan SSR
- Died: 25 June 1992 (aged 28); Aghdara, Tartar District, Azerbaijan
- Burial place: Baku, Azerbaijan
- Occupation: Military
- Awards: National Hero of Azerbaijan

Sayavush Hasan oglu Hasanov (Azerbaijani: Səyavuş Həsən oğlu Həsənov) (20 January 1964 – 25 June 1992) was an Azerbaijanian soldier and construction worker who received the National Hero of Azerbaijan award. He was born on 20 January 1964 in the Yengicə village, Sharur District of Nakhchivan Autonomous Republic of Azerbaijan.

== Biography ==
=== Early life ===
Sayavush Hasanov and his twin brother were born on 20 January 1964. Their father's name was Hassan. Hasanov studied at the local village school through the eighth grade and continued his education at vocational school number 54 in Baku. He was trained as a painter and worked in a construction company within Baku Central Construction Administration for several months. He then served his mandatory military service in Stavropol city in Russia. He returned to the Baku Central Construction Administration after he was discharged. After some time, The Construction Administration sent 300 workers to Tyumen city, and Sayavush was among them. Following the events of Black January in 1990, Hasanov returned to Azerbaijan and joined the National Movement.

=== Azerbaijanian independence ===
When voluntary defense battalions were established to protect Garabagh, Sayavush was one of the first ones to join. He fought in many regions of Azerbaijan—Gazakh, Gedebey, Goranboy, Shusha—and performed all the assigned tasks adequately. On 25 June 1992, his battalion was ordered to liberate Girmizikend village from enemy occupation. While the battalion was advancing into the village, they were subjected to heavy fire. The group strengthened its position, and they quickly began to repel attacks, but Sayavush died in the battle. A week later, his body was removed from the battlefield.

=== Family ===
He was married.

== Awards ==
He was posthumously awarded the title of National Hero of Azerbaijan by the 69th decree of the president of the Azerbaijan Republic on 21 July 1992.

He was buried in the Alley of Martyrs in Baku.
