= Mount Kaputjugh =

Mountain in Azerbaijan and Armenia

Kaputjugh
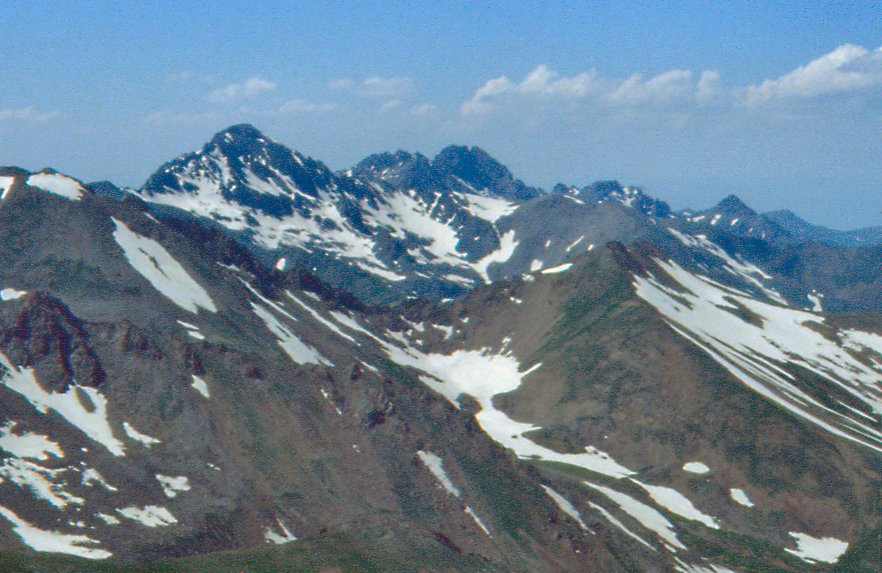
- Kaputjugh from southeast

Highest point
- Elevation: 3,905 m (12,812 ft)
- Prominence: 1,820 m (5,970 ft)
- Isolation: 156.05 km (96.96 mi)
- Listing: Ultra, Ribu
- Coordinates: 39°09′33″N 46°00′21″E

Geography
- Location within Armenia Location within Azerbaijan
- Countries: Armenia and Azerbaijan
- Parent range: Armenian Highlands

Kaputjugh (Armenian: Կապուտջուղ, lit. 'blue branch'; Azerbaijani: Qapıcıq, lit. 'small door, entrance') is the highest mountain in the Zangezur range, forming the border between the Nakhchivan Autonomous Republic of Azerbaijan and the Syunik Province of Armenia. It has an elevation of 3,905 metres (12,812 ft).

== See also ==
- List of ultras of West Asia
