= Yengicə =

- Municipality
- Location within Azerbaijan
- Coordinates: 39°32′29″N 44°55′04″E
- Country: Azerbaijan
- Autonomous republic: Nakhchivan
- District: Sharur

Population (2005)
  - Total: 3,840
- Time zone: UTC+4 (AZT)

Yengicə (also, Yengidzha, Yengija and Yenidzha) is a village and municipality in the Sharur District of Nakhchivan, Azerbaijan. It is located 2 km south-west from the district center, on the Sharur plain. Its population is busy with gardening and farming. There is a secondary school, a music school, a cultural house, a kindergarten, a flour mill, two mosques and a medical center in the village. It has a population of 3,840. The monument was erected in honor of its compatriots who died in The Great Patriotic War. There is also a bust of the National Hero of Azerbaijan Sayavush Hasanov, who was born in this village.

== Etymology ==
Yengicə (Yengija) is the phonetic form of the name Yenicə (Yenija). The villages called Yenicə and Yengicə were created as a result of the population building new settlements after moving out from the main village, mostly due to deficiency of the soil. The name means "the new village".

== Historical monuments ==
Yengija bath was built at the end of the 18th century by Tovuz Khanum from Shahtakht. The total area of the rectangular bath is 650 square meters. The building was built using baked bricks and lime measuring 19x19x5 cm. The bath building is divided into two octagonal halls and two auxiliary rooms adjacent to them. The hearth of the bathhouse is located in the south of the building.

The building of the bathhouse was restored from March 2017 to September 2018. Currently, it is not used as a bathroom. In the historical building, service was organized in 7 different areas.

== Notable natives ==
- Sayavush Hasanov — National Hero of Azerbaijan.
