= Yenicə, Agdash =

Yenicə
- Municipality
- Location within Azerbaijan
- Coordinates: 40°32′39″N 47°29′01″E
- Country: Azerbaijan
- Rayon: Agdash

Population
  - Total: 1,545
- Time zone: UTC+4 (AZT)
  - Summer (DST): UTC+5 (AZT)

Yenicə (also known as Yengidzha and Yenidzha) is a village and municipality in the Agdash Rayon of Azerbaijan. It has a population of 1,545.
