= Yengica, Qabala =

Yengica
- Municipality
- Location within Azerbaijan Location within Shaki-Zagatala Economic Region
- Coordinates: 40°52′18″N 47°51′06″E
- Country: Azerbaijan
- Rayon: Qabala

Population
  - Total: 458
- Time zone: UTC+4 (AZT)
  - Summer (DST): UTC+5 (AZT)

Yengica (also, Yengicə, Yengidzha, and Yengidzhe) is a village and municipality in the Qabala Rayon of Azerbaijan. It has a population of 458. The village is dominated by a single 5-storey spa resort.
