= Norabats =

Norabats Նորաբաց
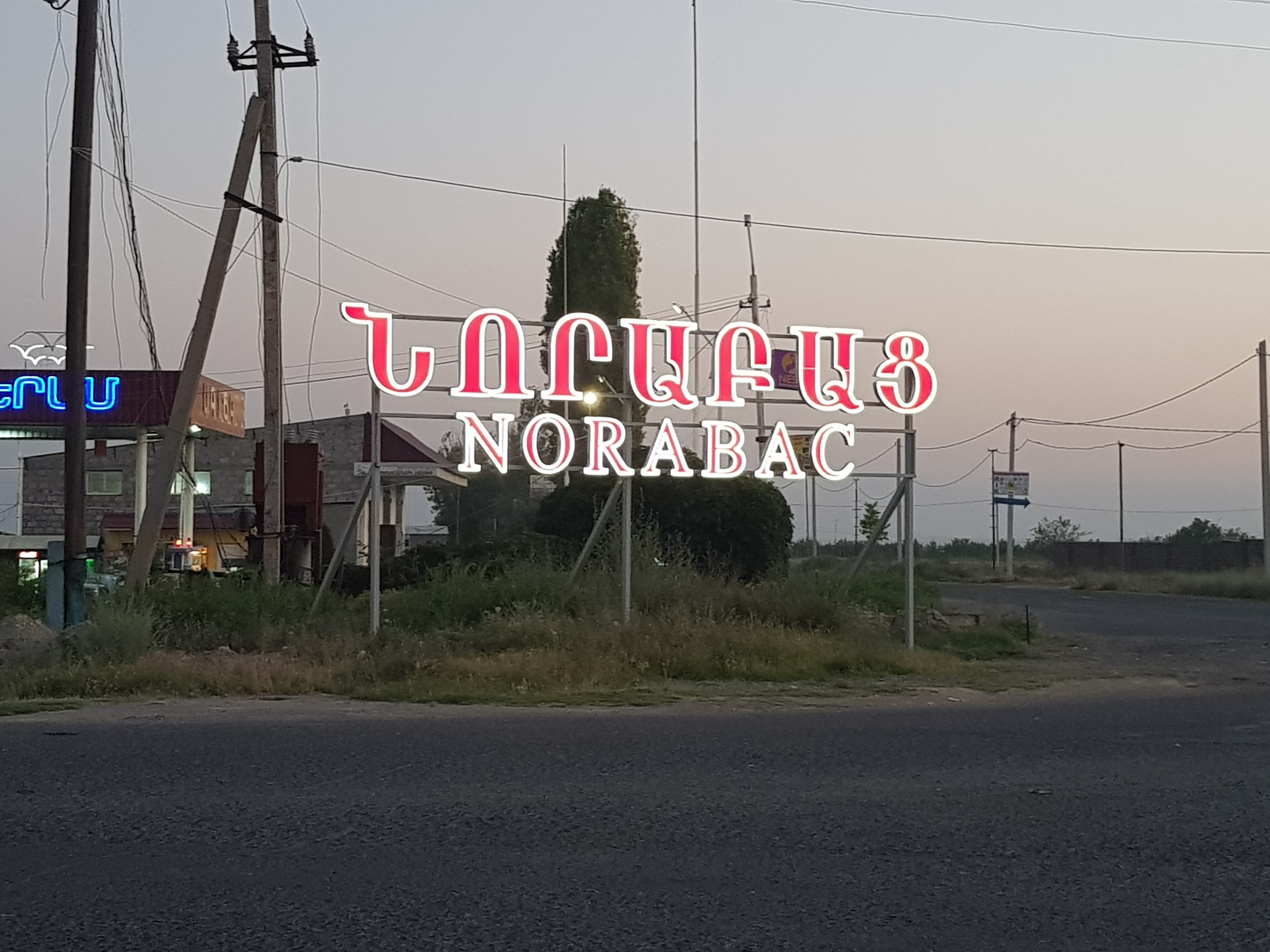
- Norabats village plaque

- Location within Armenia Location within Ararat
- Coordinates: 40°06′19″N 44°25′48″E
- Country: Armenia
- Province: Ararat
- Municipality: Masis

Population (2011)
  - Total: 2,155
- Time zone: UTC+4
  - Summer (DST): UTC+5

Norabats (Armenian: Նորաբաց) is a village in the Masis Municipality of the Ararat Province of Armenia.
