= Nakhchivan Autonomous Republic =

Landlocked exclave of Azerbaijan

Coordinates: 39°20′N 45°30′E

Nakhchivan Autonomous Republic Naxçıvan Muxtar Respublikası
- Autonomous republic
- Flag Emblem
- Anthem: Azərbaycan marşı; "March of Azerbaijan"
- Nakhchivan Autonomous Republic within Azerbaijan
- Sovereign state: Azerbaijan
- Establishment of the Nakhchivan ASSR: February 9, 1924
- Nakhchivan Autonomous Republic: November 17, 1990
- Capital and largest city: Nakhchivan
- Official languages: Azerbaijani
- Ethnic groups (2019): 99.7% Azerbaijanis; 0.3% Kurds
- Demonym(s): Nakhchivani
- Government: Autonomous parliamentary republic
  - President's plenipotentiary representative: Jeyhun Jalilov
  - Chairman of the Supreme Assembly: Bakhtiyar Mammadov (acting)
  - Prime Minister: Jabbar Musayev
- Legislature: Supreme Assembly

Area
  - Total: 5,502 km^{2} (2,124 sq mi)
  - Water (%): negligible

Population
  - 2019 census: 458,910
  - Density: 84/km^{2} (217.6/sq mi)
- HDI (2014): 0.772 high
- Currency: Azerbaijan manat (AZN)
- Time zone: UTC+4 (AZT)
- Calling code: +994 36
- ISO 3166 code: AZ

The Nakhchivan Autonomous Republic (Azerbaijani: Naxçıvan Muxtar Respublikası, pronounced [nɑxtʃɯˈvɑn muxˈtɑɾ ɾesˈpublikɑsɯ]) is a landlocked exclave of the Republic of Azerbaijan. The region covers 5,502.75 km^{2} (2,124.62 sq mi) with a population of 459,600. It is bordered by Armenia (Note: border 221 km (137 miles)) to the east and north, Iran (Note: border 179 km (111 miles)) to the southwest, and Turkey (Note: border 8 km (5.0 miles)) to the northwest. It is the sole autonomous republic of Azerbaijan, governed by its own elected legislature.

The republic, especially the capital city of Nakhchivan, has a long history dating back to about 1500 BC. Nakhijevan was one of the cantons of the historical Armenian province of Vaspurakan in the Kingdom of Armenia. Historically, the Persians, Armenians, Mongols, and Turks all competed for the region. The area that is now Nakhchivan became part of Safavid Iran in the 16th century. The semi-autonomous Nakhchivan Khanate was established there in the mid-18th century. In 1828, after the last Russo-Persian War and the Treaty of Turkmenchay, the Nakhchivan Khanate passed from Iranian into Imperial Russian possession.

After the 1917 February Revolution, Nakhchivan and its surrounding region were under the authority of the Special Transcaucasian Committee of the Russian Provisional Government and subsequently of the short-lived Transcaucasian Democratic Federative Republic. When the TDFR was dissolved in May 1918, Nakhchivan, Nagorno-Karabakh, Syunik, and Qazakh were heavily contested between the newly formed and short-lived states of the First Republic of Armenia and the Azerbaijan Democratic Republic (ADR). In June 1918, the region came under Ottoman occupation. Under the terms of the Armistice of Mudros, the Ottomans agreed to pull their troops out of the Transcaucasus to make way for British occupation at the close of the First World War. The British placed Nakhchivan under Armenian administration in April 1919, although an Azerbaijani revolt prevented Armenia from establishing full control over the territory.

In July 1920, the Bolsheviks occupied the region. In November of that year, Bolshevik Russia and Azerbaijan both promised that Nakhchivan, alongside neighboring Nagorno-Karabakh and Zangezur, was an "integral part" of Armenia. (Note: "As of today, the old frontiers between Armenia and Azerbaijan are declared to be non-existent. Mountainous Karabakh, Zangezur and Nakhchivan are recognised to be integral parts of the Socialist Republic of Armenia.") However, on March 16, 1921, in accordance with the results of a referendum, the Bolshevik government declared the Nakhchivan Autonomous Soviet Socialist Republic, which went on to become an autonomous republic within the Azerbaijan Soviet Socialist Republic in 1924. In January 1990, Nakhchivan declared independence from the USSR to protest against the suppression of the national movement in Azerbaijan, and became the Nakhchivan Autonomous Republic within the newly independent Republic of Azerbaijan a year later.

== Etymology ==
Variations of the name Nakhchivan include Nakhichevan, Naxcivan, Naxçivan, Nakhijevan, Nakhchawan, Nakhitchevan, Nakhjavan, and Nakhdjevan. Nakhchivan is mentioned in Ptolemy's Geography and by other classical writers as "Naxuana".

The older form of the name is Naxčawan (Armenian: Նախճաւան). According to philologist Heinrich Hübschmann, the name was originally borne by the namesake city (modern Nakhchivan) and later given to the region. Hübschmann believed the name to be composed of Naxič or Naxuč (probably a personal name) and awan, an Armenian word (ultimately of Iranian origin) meaning "place, town".

In the Armenian tradition, the name of the region and its namesake city is connected with the Biblical narrative of Noah's Ark and interpreted as meaning "place of the first descent" or "first resting place" (as if deriving from նախ, nax, 'first' and իջեւան, ijewan, 'abode, resting place') due to it being regarded as the site where Noah descended and settled after the landing of the Ark on nearby Mount Ararat. It was probably under the influence of this tradition that the name changed in Armenian from the older Naxčawan to Naxijewan. Although this is a folk etymology, William Whiston believed Nakhchivan/Nakhijevan to be the Apobatērion ("place of descent") mentioned by the first-century Jewish historian Flavius Josephus in connection with Noah's Ark, which would make the tradition connecting the name with the Biblical figure Noah very old, predating Armenia's conversion to Christianity in the early fourth century.

== History ==
=== Early history ===
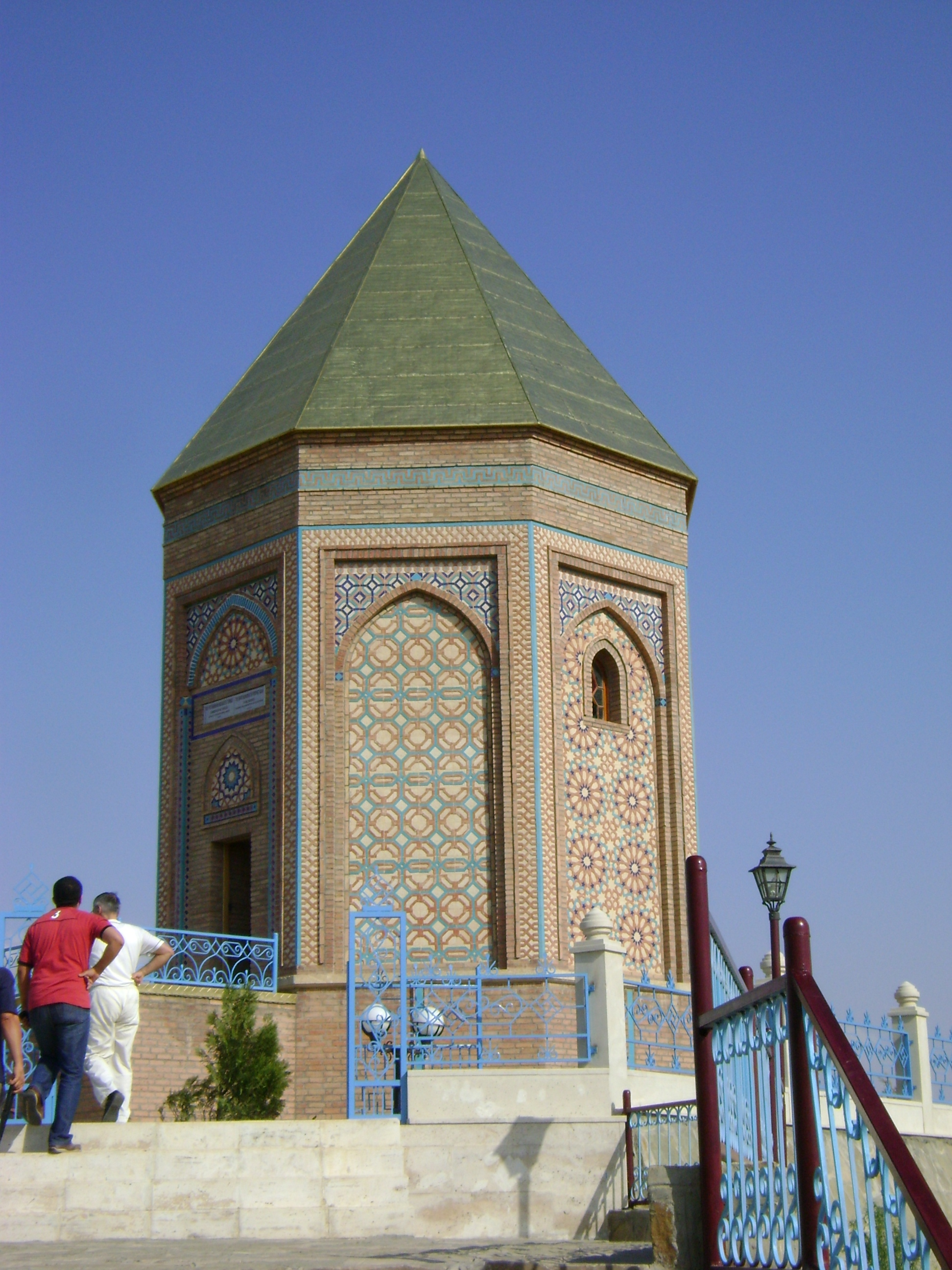
A modern mausoleum marks the place in Nakhchivan City, traditionally believed to be the site of Noah's grave.

The oldest material culture artifacts found in the region date back to the Neolithic Age. On the other hand, Azerbaijani archaeologists have found that the history of Nakhchivan dates back to the Stone Age (Paleolithic). As a result of archaeological diggings, archaeologists discovered a great number of Stone-Age materials in different regions of Nakhchivan. These materials were useful to study the Paleolithic age in Azerbaijan. Pollen analysis conducted in Gazma Cave (Sharur District) suggests that humans in the Middle Palaeolithic (Mousterian) lived not only in the mountain forests but also in the dry woodlands found in Nakhchivan. Several archaeological sites dating from the Neolithic and Chalcolithic periods have also been found in Nakhchivan, including the ancient towns of Nakhchivan Tepe (near the city of Nakhchivan) and Ovchular Tepesi. Some of the oldest salt mines in the world have also been discovered.

The region was part of the states of Urartu and later Media. It became part of the Satrapy of Armenia under Achaemenid Persia c. 521 BC. After the death of Alexander the Great in 323 BC several generals of the Macedonian army, including Neoptolemus, attempted but failed to take control of the region, and it was ruled by the native Armenian dynasty of Orontids until Armenia was conquered by Antiochus III the Great (ruled 222–187 BC).

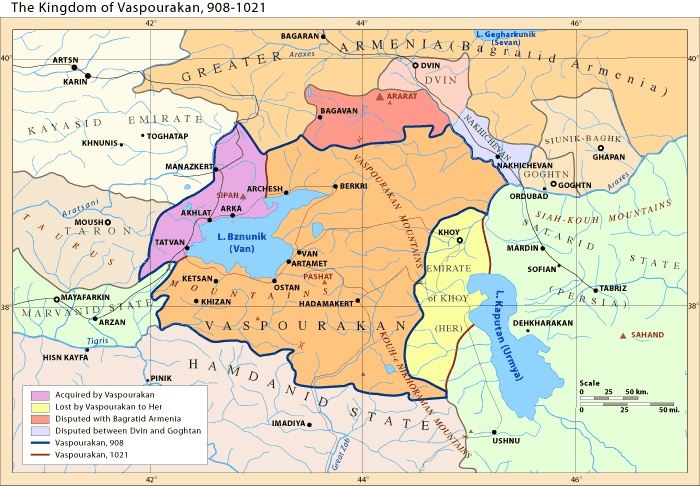
The Nakhichevan region (light purple) at the time of Armenia's Kingdom of Vaspurakan (908–1021)

In 189 BC, Nakhchivan became part of the new Kingdom of Armenia established by Artaxias I. Within the kingdom, the region of present-day Nakhchivan was part of the Ayrarat, Vaspurakan and Syunik provinces. According to the early medieval Armenian historian Movses Khorenatsi, from the third to second centuries, the region belonged to the Muratsyan nakharar family but after disputes with central power, King Artavazd I massacred the family and seized the lands and formally attached it to the kingdom. The area's status as a major trade center allowed it to prosper; as a result, many foreign powers coveted it. According to the Armenian historian Faustus of Byzantium (5th century), when the Sassanid Persians invaded Armenia, Sassanid King Shapur II (310–380) removed 2,000 Armenian and 16,000 Jewish families in 360–370. In 428, the Armenian Arshakuni monarchy was abolished and Nakhchivan was annexed by Sassanid Persia. In 623, possession of the region passed to the Byzantine Empire but was soon left to its own rule. Sebeos referred to the area as Tachkastan. According to the 5th-century Armenian author Koriun, Nakhchivan was the place where the Armenian scholar Mesrop Mashtots finished the creation of the Armenian alphabet and opened the first Armenian schools. This occurred in the province of Goghtan, which corresponds to Nakhchivan's modern Ordubad district.

From 640 on, the Arabs invaded Nakhchivan and undertook many campaigns in the area, crushing all resistance and attacking Armenian nobles who remained in contact with the Byzantines or who refused to pay tribute. In 705, after suppressing an Armenian revolt, Arab viceroy Muhammad ibn Marwan decided to eliminate the Armenian nobility. In Nakhchivan, several hundred Armenian nobles were locked up in churches and burnt, while others were crucified.

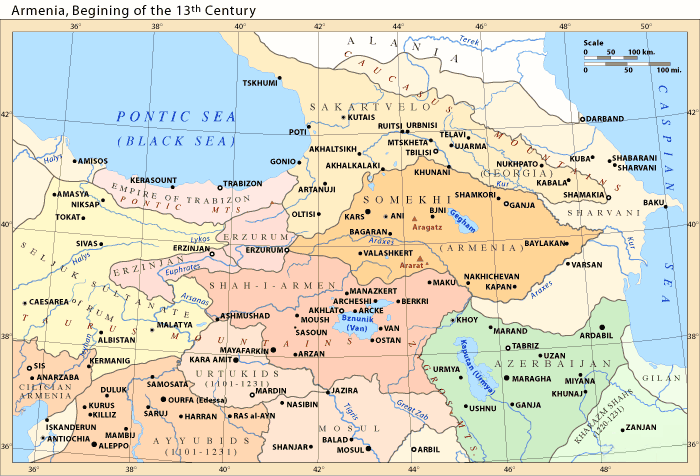
Caucasus region, beginning of the 13th century

The violence caused many Armenian princes to flee to the neighboring Kingdom of Georgia or the Byzantine Empire. Meanwhile, Nakhchivan itself became part of the autonomous Principality of Armenia under Arab control. In the eighth century, Nakhchivan was one of the scenes of an uprising against the Arabs led by Persian revolutionary Babak Khorramdin of the Iranian Khorram-Dinān ("those of the joyous religion" in Persian). Nakhchivan was finally released from Arab rule in the tenth century by Bagratuni King Smbat I and handed over to the princes of Syunik. This region also was taken by Sajids in 895 and between 909 and 929, Sallarid between 942 and 971 and Shaddadid between 971 and 1045.

About 1055, the Seljuk Turks took over the region. In the 12th century, the city of Nakhchivan became the capital of the state of Atabegs of Azerbaijan, also known as Ildegizid state, which included most of Iranian Azerbaijan and a significant part of the South Caucasus. The magnificent 12th-century mausoleum of Momine Khatun, the wife of Ildegizid ruler, Great Atabeg Jahan Pehlevan, is the main attraction of modern Nakhchivan. At its heyday, the Ildegizid authority in Nakhchivan and some other areas of South Caucasus was contested by Georgia. The Armeno-Georgian princely house of Zacharids frequently raided the region when the Atabeg state was in decline in the early years of the 13th century. It was then plundered by invading Mongols in 1220 and Khwarezmians in 1225 and became part of Mongol Empire in 1236 when the Caucasus was invaded by Chormaqan. In the 13th century, during the reign of the Mongol horde ruler Güyük Khan, Christians were allowed to build churches in the strongly Muslim town of Nakhchivan; however, the conversion to Islam of Gazan khan brought about a reversal of this favor. The 14th century saw the rise of Armenian Catholicism in Nakhchivan, though by the 15th century the territory became part of the states of Kara Koyunlu and Ak Koyunlu.

=== Iranian rule ===
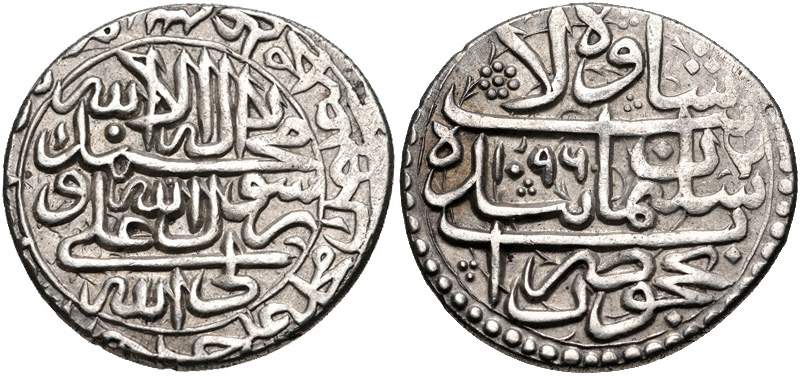
Silver coin of Shah Suleiman I (r. 1666–1694), struck at the Nakhchivan mint, dated 1684/5

In the 16th century, control of Nakhchivan passed to the Safavid dynasty. Until the demise of the Safavids, it remained as an administrative jurisdiction of the Erivan Province (also known as Chokhur-e Sa'd). Because of its geographic position, it frequently suffered during the wars between the Safavids and the Ottoman Empire, from the 16th to 18th centuries. Turkish historian İbrahim Peçevi described the passing of the Ottoman army from the Ararat plain to Nakhchivan:

On the twenty-seventh day they reached the plain of Nakhichevan. Out of fear of the victorious army, the people deserted the cities, villages, houses, and places of dwelling, which were so desolate that they were occupied by owls and crows and struck the onlooker with terror. Moreover, they [the Ottomans] ruined and laid waste all of the villages, towns, fields, and buildings along the road over a distance of four or five days' march so that there was no sign of any buildings or life.

In 1604, Shah Abbas I of Iran, concerned that the skilled peoples of Nakhchivan, its natural resources, and the surrounding areas could get in danger due to its relatively close proximity to the Ottoman-Persian frontline, decided to institute a scorched earth policy. He forcefully deported the entire hundreds of thousands of local population—Muslims, Jews, and Armenians alike—to leave their homes and move to the provinces south of the Aras River.

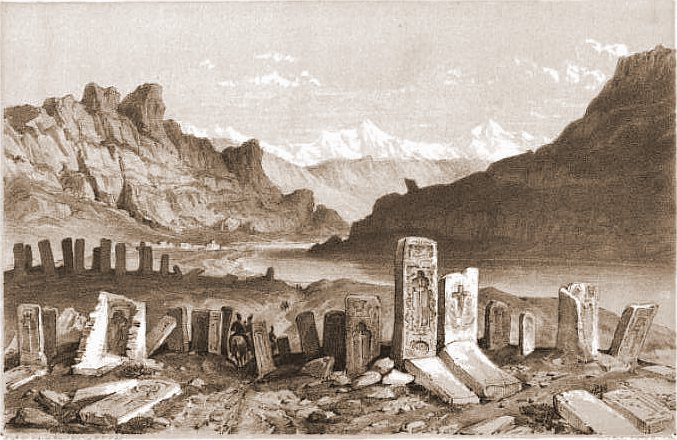
Armenian cemetery in Julfa, 1830, by Francis Rawdon Chesney

Many of the Armenian deportees were settled in the neighborhood of Isfahan that was named New Julfa since most of the residents were from the original Julfa. The Turkic Kangerli tribe was later permitted to move back under Shah Abbas II (1642–1666) to repopulate the frontier region of his realm. In the 17th century, Nakhchivan was the scene of a peasant movement led by Köroğlu against foreign invaders and "native exploiters". In 1747, the Nakhchivan Khanate emerged in the region after the death of Nader Shah Afshar.

=== Passing to Imperial Russian rule ===
After the last Russo-Persian War and the Treaty of Turkmenchay, the Nakhchivan Khanate passed into Russian possession in 1828 due to Iran's forced ceding as a result of the outcome of the war and treaty. With the onset of Russian rule, the Tsarist authorities encouraged resettlement of Armenians to Nakhchivan and other areas of the Caucasus from the Persian and Ottoman Empires. Special clauses of the Turkmenchay and Adrianople treaties allowed for this. Alexandr Griboyedov, the Russian envoy to Persia, stated that by the time Nakhchivan came under Russian rule, there had been 290 native Armenians families in the province excluding the city of Nakhchivan, the number of Muslim families was 1,632, and the number of the Armenian immigrant families was 943. The same numbers in the city of Nakhchivan were 114, 392, and 285 respectively. With such a dramatic influx of Armenian immigrants, Griboyedov noted friction arising between the Armenian and Muslim populations. He requested Russian army commander Count Ivan Paskevich to give orders on resettlement of some of the arriving people further to the region of Daralayaz to quiet the tensions.

The Nakhchivan Khanate was dissolved in 1828 the same year it came into Russian possession, and its territory was merged with the territory of the Erivan khanate and the area became the Nakhichevan uezd of the new Armenian oblast, which later became the Erivan Governorate in 1849. According to official statistics of the Russian Empire, by the turn of the 20th century Tatars (later known as Azerbaijanis) made up roughly 57% of the uezd's population, while Armenians constituted roughly 42%. At the same time in the western half of the Sharur-Daralayaz uezd, the territory of which would form the northern part of modern-day Nakhchivan (Sharur District), Tatars constituted 70.5% of the population, while Armenians made up 27.5%. During the Russian Revolution of 1905, conflict erupted between the Armenians and the Tatars, culminating in the Armenian-Tatar massacres which saw violence in Nakhchivan in May of that year.

=== War and revolution ===
In the final year of World War I, Nakhchivan was the scene of more bloodshed between Armenians and Azerbaijanis, who both laid claim to the area. By 1914, the Armenian population had decreased slightly to 40% while the Azeri population increased to roughly 60%. After the February Revolution, the region was under the authority of the Special Transcaucasian Committee of the Russian Provisional Government and subsequently of the short-lived Transcaucasian Democratic Federative Republic. When the TDFR was dissolved in May 1918, Nakhchivan, Nagorno-Karabakh, Zangezur (today the Armenian province of Syunik), and Qazakh were heavily contested between the newly formed and short-lived states of the Republic of Armenia and the Azerbaijan Democratic Republic (ADR). In June 1918, the region came under Ottoman occupation. The Ottomans proceeded to massacre 10,000 Armenians and razed 45 of their villages. Under the terms of the Armistice of Mudros, the Ottomans agreed to pull their troops out of the Transcaucasus to make way for the forthcoming British military presence.

Under British occupation, Sir Oliver Wardrop, British Chief Commissioner in the South Caucasus, made a border proposal to solve the conflict. According to Wardrop, Armenian claims against Azerbaijan should not go beyond the administrative borders of the former Erivan Governorate (which under prior Imperial Russian rule encompassed Nakhchivan), while Azerbaijan was to be limited to the governorates of Baku and Elizavetpol. This proposal was rejected by both Armenians (who did not wish to give up their claims to Qazakh, Zangezur and Karabakh) and Azeris (who found it unacceptable to give up their claims to Nakhchivan). As disputes between both countries continued, it soon became apparent that the fragile peace under British occupation would not last.

In December 1918, with the support of Azerbaijan's Musavat Party, Jafargulu Khan Nakhchivanski declared the Republic of Aras in the Nakhchivan uyezd of the former Erivan Governorate assigned to Armenia by Wardrop. The Armenian government did not recognize the new state and sent its troops into the region to take control of it. The conflict soon erupted into the violent Aras War. British journalist C. E. Bechhofer Roberts described the situation in April 1920:

You cannot persuade a party of frenzied nationalists that two blacks do not make a white; consequently, no day went by without a catalogue of complaints from both sides, Armenians and Tartars [Azeris], of unprovoked attacks, murders, village burnings and the like. Specifically, the situation was a series of vicious cycles.

By mid-June 1919, however, Armenia succeeded in establishing control over Nakhchivan and the whole territory of the self-proclaimed republic. The fall of the Aras republic triggered an invasion by the regular Azerbaijani army and by the end of July, the Armenian administration was ousted from Nakhchivan. Again, more violence erupted leaving some ten thousand Armenians dead and forty-five Armenian villages destroyed. Meanwhile, feeling the situation to be hopeless and unable to maintain any control over the area, the British decided to withdraw from the region in mid-1919. Still, fighting between Armenians and Azeris continued and after a series of skirmishes that took place throughout the Nakhchivan district, a cease-fire agreement was concluded. However, the cease-fire lasted only briefly, and by early March 1920, more fighting broke out, primarily in Karabakh between Karabakh Armenians and Azerbaijan's regular army. This triggered conflicts in other areas with mixed populations, including Nakhchivan.

Following the adoption of the name of "Azerbaijan" by the newly established Azerbaijan Democratic Republic, a naming dispute arose with Qajar Iran, with the latter protesting this decision. In tandem with this naming controversy, however, the young Azerbaijan Republic also faced a threat from the nascent Soviets in Moscow and the Armenians. In order to escape the possibility of a Soviet invasion and an even greater imminent threat of an Armenian invasion, Muslim Nakhchivan proposed being annexed to Iran. The then pro-British government in Tehran led by Vossug ed Dowleh made endeavours amongst Baku's leadership to join Iran. In order to promote this idea, Vosugh ed Dowleh dispatched two separate Iranian delegations; one to Baku and one to the Paris Peace Conference in 1919. The delegation at Baku, at the behest of Zia ol Din Tabatabaee, held intensive negotiations with the leadership of the Musavat party during the increasing chaos and instability in the city. During the closing stages, an accord was reached between them; however, before the idea was presented to Vossug ed Dowleh in Tehran, the Communists took over Baku and terminated the Musavat-Ottoman rule. The Iranian delegation at Paris, which was headed by foreign minister Firouz Nosrat-ed-Dowleh III, reached a unity negotiation with the delegation from Baku and signed a confederation agreement. In the end, these efforts proved to be of no avail, with the Soviets taking over the entirety of Transcaucasia.

=== Sovietization ===
In July 1920, the 11th Soviet Red Army invaded and occupied the region and on July 28, declared the Nakhchivan Autonomous Soviet Socialist Republic with "close ties" to the Azerbaijan SSR. In November, on the verge of taking over Armenia, the Bolsheviks, to attract public support, promised they would allot Nakhchivan to Armenia, along with Karabakh and Zangezur. Nariman Narimanov, leader of Bolshevik Azerbaijan, issued a declaration celebrating the "victory of Soviet power in Armenia" and proclaimed that both Nakhchivan and Zangezur should be awarded to the Armenian people as a sign of the Azerbaijani people's support for Armenia's fight against the former Armenian government:

As of today, the old frontiers between Armenia and Azerbaijan are declared to be non-existent. Mountainous Karabagh, Zangezur and Nakhchivan are recognised to be integral parts of the Socialist Republic of Armenia.

Vladimir Lenin, while welcoming this act of "great Soviet fraternity" where "boundaries had no meaning among the family of Soviet peoples", did not agree with the motion and instead called for the people of Nakhchivan to be consulted in a referendum. According to the formal figures of this referendum, held at the beginning of 1921, 90% of Nakhchivan's population wanted to be included in the Azerbaijan SSR "with the rights of an autonomous republic". The decision to make Nakhchivan a part of modern-day Azerbaijan was cemented on March 16, 1921, in the Treaty of Moscow between Soviet Russia and the newly founded Republic of Turkey. The agreement between Soviet Russia and Turkey also called for attachment of the former Sharur-Daralagezsky Uyezd (which had a solid Azeri majority) to Nakhchivan, thus allowing Turkey to share a border with the Azerbaijan SSR. This deal was reaffirmed on October 13, in the Treaty of Kars. Article V of the treaty stated the following:

The Turkish Government and the Soviet Governments of Armenia and Azerbaijan are agreed that the region of Nakhchivan, within the limits specified by Annex III to the present Treaty, constitutes an autonomous territory under the protection of Azerbaijan.

Thus, on February 9, 1924, the Soviet Union officially established the Nakhchivan ASSR. Its constitution was adopted on April 18, 1926.

=== In the Soviet Union ===
As a constituent part of the Soviet Union, tensions lessened over the ethnic composition of Nakhchivan or any territorial claims regarding it. Instead, it became an important point of industrial production with particular emphasis on the mining of minerals such as salt. Under Soviet rule, it was once a major junction on the Moscow-Tehran railway line as well as the Baku-Yerevan railway. It also served as an important strategic area during the Cold War, sharing borders with both Turkey (a NATO member state) and Iran (a close ally of the West until the Iranian Revolution of 1979).

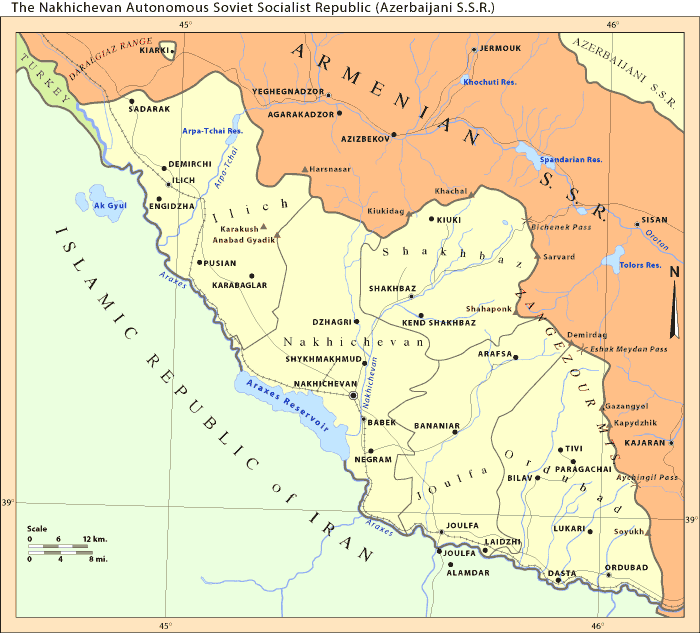
Map of the Nakhchivan ASSR within the Soviet Union

Facilities improved during Soviet times. Education and public health especially began to see some major changes. In 1913, Nakhchivan only had two hospitals with a total of 20 beds. The region was plagued by widespread diseases including trachoma and typhus. Malaria, which mostly came from the adjoining Aras River, brought serious harm to the region. At any one time, between 70% and 85% of Nakhchivan's population was infected with malaria, and in the region of Norashen (present-day Sharur) almost 100% were struck with the disease. This situation improved dramatically under Soviet rule. Malaria was sharply reduced and trachoma, typhus, and relapsing fever were eliminated.

During the Soviet era, Nakhchivan saw a great demographic shift. In 1926, 15% of the region's population was Armenian, but by 1979, this number had shrunk to 1.4%. Azeris made up 85% in 1926, but 96% in 1979 (leaving the small remainder mixed or other). Three factors were involved: the emigration of Armenians to the Armenian SSR, the immigration of Azeris from Armenia, and the birth rate of Azeris being higher than that of Armenians.

Armenians in Nagorno-Karabakh noted similar though slower demographic trends and feared an eventual "de-Armenianization" of the area. When tensions between Armenians and Azeris were reignited in the late-1980s by the Nagorno-Karabakh conflict, Azerbaijan's Popular Front managed to pressure the Azerbaijan SSR to instigate a railway and air blockade against Armenia, while another reason for the disruption of rail service to Armenia were attacks of Armenian forces on the trains entering the Armenian territory from Azerbaijan, which resulted in railroad personnel refusing to enter Armenia. This effectively crippled Armenia's economy, as 85% of the cargo and goods arrived through rail traffic. In response, Armenia closed the railway to Nakhchivan, thereby strangling the exclave's only link to the rest of the Soviet Union. The transportation and economic blockade against Armenia was later joined by Turkey in 1993 and has persisted to today.

December 1989 saw unrest in Nakhchivan as its Azeri inhabitants moved to physically dismantle the Soviet border with Iran to flee the area and meet their ethnic Azeri cousins in northern Iran. This action was angrily denounced by the Soviet leadership and the Soviet media accused the Azeris of "embracing Islamic fundamentalism".

==== Declaring independence ====
On Saturday, January 20, 1990, the Supreme Soviet of the Nakhchivan ASSR issued a declaration stating the intention for Nakhchivan to secede from the USSR to protest the Soviet Union's actions during Black January. Iranian Press Agency, IRNA, reported that upon its independence, Nakhchivan asked Turkey, Iran, and the United Nations to come to its aid. It was the first part of the Soviet Union to declare independence, preceding Lithuania's declaration by only a few weeks. Subsequently, Nakhchivan was independent from Moscow and Baku but was then brought under control by the clan of Heydar Aliyev.

=== In the post-Soviet era ===
Heydar Aliyev, the future president of Azerbaijan, returned to his birthplace of Nakhchivan in 1990, after being ousted from his position in the Politburo by Mikhail Gorbachev in 1987. Soon after returning to Nakhchivan, Aliyev was elected to the Supreme Soviet by an overwhelming majority. Aliyev subsequently resigned from the CPSU, and after the failed August 1991 coup against Gorbachev, he called for complete independence for Azerbaijan and denounced Ayaz Mütallibov for supporting the coup. In late 1991, Aliyev consolidated his power base as chairman of the Nakhchivan Supreme Soviet and asserted Nakhchivan's near-total independence from Baku.

Nakhchivan became a scene of conflict during the First Nagorno-Karabakh War. On May 4, 1992, Armenian forces shelled the raion of Sadarak. The Armenians claimed that the attack was in response to cross-border shelling of Armenian villages by Azeri forces from Nakhchivan. David Zadoyan, a 42-year-old Armenian physicist and mayor of the region, said that the Armenians lost patience after months of firing by the Azeris. "If they were sitting on our hilltops and harassing us with gunfire, what do you think our response should be?" he asked. The government of Nakhchivan denied these charges and instead asserted that the Armenian assault was unprovoked and specifically targeted the site of a bridge between Turkey and Nakhchivan. "The Armenians do not react to diplomatic pressure," Nakhchivan foreign minister Rza Ibadov told the ITAR-Tass news agency, "It's vital to speak to them in a language they understand." Speaking to the agency from the Turkish capital Ankara, Ibadov said that Armenia's aim in the region was to seize control of Nakhchivan. According to Human Rights Watch, hostilities broke out after three people were killed when Armenian forces began shelling the region.

The heaviest fighting took place on May 18, when the Armenians captured Nakhchivan's exclave of Karki, a tiny territory through which Armenia's main north–south highway passes. The exclave presently remains under Armenian control. After the fall of Shusha, the Mütallibov government of Azerbaijan accused Armenia of moving to take the whole of Nakhchivan (a claim that was denied by Armenian government officials). However, Heydar Aliyev declared a unilateral ceasefire on May 23 and sought to conclude a separate peace with Armenia. Armenian President Levon Ter-Petrossian expressed his willingness to sign a cooperation treaty with Nakhchivan to end the fighting, and subsequently a cease-fire was agreed upon.

The conflict in the area caused a harsh reaction from Turkey. Turkish Prime Minister Tansu Çiller announced that any Armenian advance on the main territory of Nakhchivan would result in a declaration of war against Armenia. Russian military leaders declared that "third party intervention into the dispute could trigger a Third World War". Thousands of Turkish troops were sent to the border between Turkey and Armenia in early September. Russian military forces in Armenia countered their movements by increasing troop levels along the Armenian-Turkish frontier and bolstering defenses in a tense period where war between the two seemed inevitable. The tension reached its peak, when Turkish heavy artillery shelled the Nakhchivan side of the Nakhchivan-Armenian border, from the Turkish border for two hours. Iran also reacted to Armenia's attacks by conducting military maneuvers along its border with Nakhchivan in a move widely interpreted as a warning to Armenia. However, Armenia did not launch any further attacks on Nakhchivan and the presence of Russia's military warded off any possibility that Turkey might play a military role in the conflict. After a period of political instability, the Parliament of Azerbaijan turned to Heydar Aliyev and invited him to return from exile in Nakhchivan to lead the country in 1993.

=== Recent times ===
Today, Nakhchivan retains its autonomy as the Nakhchivan Autonomous Republic, and is internationally recognized as a constituent part of Azerbaijan governed by its own elected legislative assembly. A new constitution for Nakhchivan was approved in a referendum on November 12, 1995. The constitution was adopted by the republic's assembly on April 28, 1998, and has been in force since January 8, 1999. However, the republic remains isolated, not only from the rest of Azerbaijan, but practically from the entire South Caucasus region. From 1995 until his resignation in December 2022, the region was ruled by Vasif Talibov, who is related by marriage to Azerbaijan's ruling family, the Aliyevs. He was known for his authoritarian and largely corrupt rule of the region. Most residents prefer to watch Turkish television as opposed to Nakhchivan television, which one Azerbaijani journalist criticised as "a propaganda vehicle for Talibov and the Aliyevs."

Economic hardships and energy shortages plague the area. There have been many cases of migrant workers seeking jobs in neighboring Turkey. "Emigration rates to Turkey," one analyst said, "are so high that most of the residents of the Besler district in Istanbul are Nakhchivanis." In 2007, an agreement was struck with Iran to obtain more gas exports, and a new bridge on the Aras River between the two countries was inaugurated in October 2007; the Azerbaijani president, Ilham Aliyev and the first vice-president of Iran, Parviz Davoodi also attended the opening ceremony.

On November 9, 2020, the leaders of Armenia and Azerbaijan signed a Russian-mediated ceasefire agreement which ended the Second Nagorno-Karabakh War. The agreement provided for the unblocking of all economic and transport connections in the region, and Armenia agreed "to guarantee the security of transport connections between the western regions of the Republic of Azerbaijan and the Nakhchivan Autonomous Republic in order to arrange unobstructed movement of persons, vehicles and cargo in both directions". According to the agreement, these transport communications were to be patrolled by Border Service of the Federal Security Service of the Russian Federation. In August 2025, the two countries signed a joint declaration, this time mediated by the United States, by which a transit corridor connecting mainland Azerbaijan and the Nakhchivan Autonomous Republic through southern Armenia would be established. The route, called the Trump Route for International Peace and Prosperity (TRIPP), is to be developed by a US-Armenian joint venture—the TRIPP Development Company—with exclusive rights to the project for 49 years.

== Governance ==
Since Azerbaijan regained independence in 1991, the Nakhchivan Autonomous Republic (NAR) has formally remained an autonomous but integral part of Azerbaijan. Nakhchivan has maintained its own institutions, including a 45-member Supreme Assembly, Cabinet of Ministers and courts, as well as authority over its regional budget and several areas of economic and social policy. After Vasif Talibov assumed leadership in 1995, however, he exercised extensive personal control over the region's political and administrative institutions for 27 years. Independent investigations described Nakhchivan under Talibov as a repressive personal fiefdom in which political dissent and independent media were suppressed, while his family and associates accumulated significant corporate, banking and property interests and benefited from state contracts. This concentration of political and economic power coexisted with unemployment, outward migration and substantial dependence on subsidies from Azerbaijan's central budget. Under Talibov, Nakhchivan was repeatedly characterised as "Azerbaijan's North Korea", referring to its political repression, isolation and opacity.

The system changed abruptly in late 2022, when Baku took control of Nakhchivan's security and customs structures, senior officials were arrested on corruption or embezzlement charges, Talibov resigned, and a presidential representative reporting directly to Azerbaijan's president was installed. Centralisation deepened in 2026, when constitutional amendments strengthened the president's authorised representation in Nakhchivan and further subordinated the regional executive to Baku. Nakhchivan's post-Soviet development has shifted from formal autonomy combined with highly personalised local rule toward formal autonomy under increasingly direct central control, while its economy has remained dependent on central-budget support and shaped by politically connected business networks and labour migration.

== Administrative divisions ==
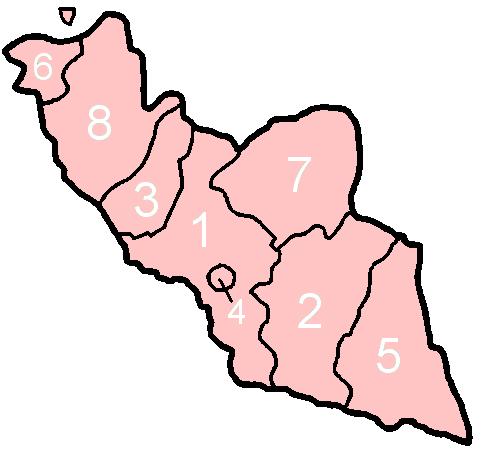
Subdivisions of Nakhchivan

Nakhchivan is subdivided into eight administrative divisions. Seven of these are raions. The capital city (şəhər) of Nakhchivan City is treated separately.

Map ref.	Administrative division	Capital	Type	Area (km^{2})	Population (August 1, 2011, estimate)	Notes
1	Babek (Babək)	Babek	District	749,81	66,200	Formerly known as Nakhchivan; renamed after Babak Khorramdin in 1991
2	Julfa (Culfa)	Julfa	District	1012,75	43,000	Also spelled Jugha or Dzhulfa.
3	Kangarli (Kəngərli)	Givraq	District	711,86	28,900	Split from Babek in March 2004
4	Nakhchivan City (Naxçıvan Şəhər)	n/a	Municipality	191,82	85,700	Split from Nakhchivan (Babek) in 1991
5	Ordubad	Ordubad	District	994,88	46,500	Split from Julfa during Sovietization
6	Sadarak (Sədərək)	Heydarabad	District	153,49	14,500	Split from Sharur in 1990; de jure includes the Karki exclave in Armenia, which is de facto under Armenian control
7	Shahbuz (Şahbuz)	Shahbuz	District	838,04	23,400	Split from Nakhchivan (Babek) during Sovietization Territory roughly corresponds to the Čahuk (Չահւք) district of the historic Syunik region within the Kingdom of Armenia
8	Sharur (Şərur)	Sharur	District	847,35	106,600	Formerly known as Bashnorashen during its incorporation into the Soviet Union and Ilyich (after Vladimir Ilyich Lenin) from the post-Sovietization period to 1990
	Total			5,500	414,900	

== Demographics ==
Ethnic groups in Nakhchivan in Censuses
Year	Azerbaijanis (Note: Records prior to 1918 used the word Tatar (Russian for Turkic people), who are the ancestors of modern-day Azerbaijanis.)	%	Armenians	%	Others (Note: Russians, Kurds, Turks, Ukrainians, Georgians, Persians etc.)	%	Total
1828	2,024 (Note: Tatars (later known as Azerbaijanis) combined with other Muslims.)	55.3	1,632	44.7			3,656
1831	▲17,138	56.1	▲13,342	43.7	27	1.2	30,507
1896	▲49,425	56.9	▲36,671	42.2	▲583	0.7	86,878
1897^{5}	▲64,151	63.7	▼34,672	34.4	▲1,948	1.9	100,771
1916 (Note: The Nakhichevan uezd did not include the population of the Sharur or Sadarak districts which were part of the Sharur-Daralayaz and Erivan uezds, respectively.)	▲81,191	59.3	▲54,209	39.6	▼1,459	1.1	136,859
1926	▲88,433	84.3	▼11,276	10.8	▲4,947	4.7	104,656
1939	▲108,529	85.7	▲13,350	10.5	▼4,817	3.8	126,696
1959	▲127,508	90.2	▼9,519	6.7	▼4,334	3.1	141,361
1970	▲189,679	93.8	▼5,828	2.9	▲6,680	3.3	202,187
1979	▲229,968	95.6	▼3,406	1.4	▲7,085	2.9	240,459
1989	▲281,807	95.9	▼1,858	0.6	▲10,210	3.5	293,875
1999	▲350,806	99.1	▼17	0	▼3,249	0.9	354,072
2009	▲396,709	99.6	▼6	0	▼1,608	0.4	398,323
2019	▲457,619	99.7	▼5	0	▼1,286	0.3	458,910

Ethnic groups in Nakhchivan AR (2019 census):
1. Azerbaijanis (99.7%)
2. Kurds (0.25%)
3. Others (0.03%)

As of 2019 census, Nakhchivan's population was estimated to be 457,619. Most of the population are Azerbaijanis, who constituted 99.72% of the population in 2019, while Kurds constituted the largest minority with a 0.25% of the population.

The Kurds of Nakhchivan are mainly found in the districts of Sadarak and Teyvaz. The remaining Armenians were expelled by Azerbaijani forces during the conflict over Nagorno-Karabakh as part of the forceful exchange of population between Armenia and Azerbaijan. According to a 1932 Soviet estimate, 85% of the area's population was rural, while only 15% was urban. This urban percentage increased to 18% by 1939 and 27% by 1959. As of 2011, 127,200 people of Nakhchivan's total population of 435,400 live in urban areas, making the urban percentage 29.2%.

Nakhchivan enjoys a high Human Development Index; its socio-economic development far exceeds that of the neighbouring countries except for Turkey, as well as Azerbaijan itself. According to the report of Nakhchivan AR Committee of Statistics on June 30, 2014, for the end of 2013, some socio-economical data, including the following, are unveiled:

Variable	Value
Population	452,831
GNI (PPP) per capita	$15,300
Life expectancy at birth	76.1 years
Mean years of schooling	11.2 years
Expected years of schooling	11.8 years

Making use of the Human Development Index calculation method according to the new UNHD 2014 method, the above values change into these:

Variable	Value
Income Index	0.7599
Life Expectancy Index	0.8630
Education Index	0.7011

Further, the value of the HDI comes to:

$$(0.7599 \cdot 0.8630 \cdot 0.7011) ^ \frac {1} {3} = 0.772.$$

Were it a country, Nakhchivan would be ranked between Malaysia (62nd) and Mauritius (63rd) for its HDI. Iran's HDI is 0.749 (75th), Turkey's 0.759 (69th), and Azerbaijan's 0.747 (76th).

== Geography ==
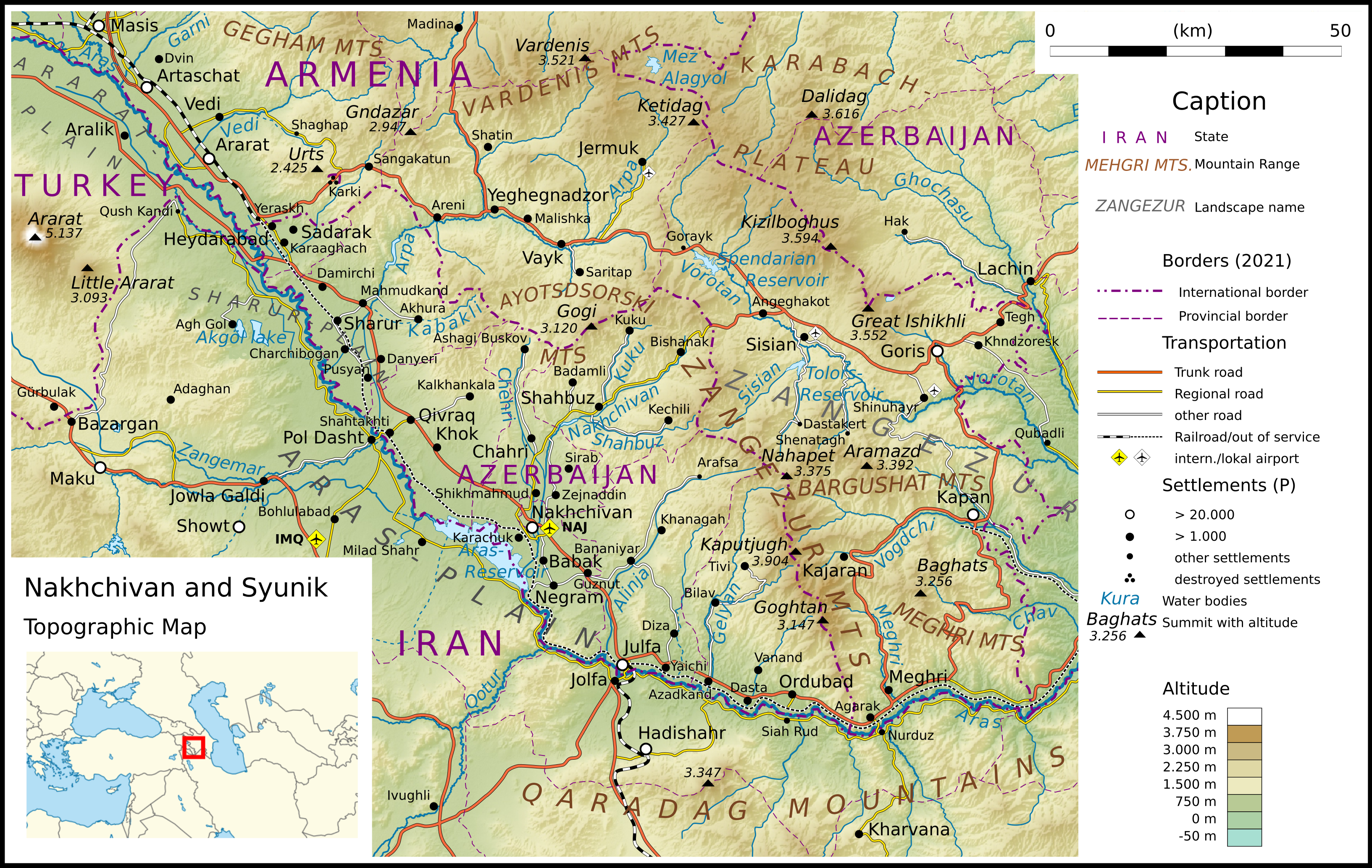
Topographic map of the region

Nakhchivan is a semi-desert region that is separated from the main portion of Azerbaijan by Armenia. The Zangezur Mountains make up its border with Armenia while the Aras River defines its border with Iran. The Araz reservoir located on that river supplies water for agricultural needs and the hydroelectric dam generates power for both Azerbaijan and Iran.

Nakhchivan is arid and mountainous. Its highest peak is Mount Kapudzhukh 3,904 m (12,808 ft) and its most distinctive is İlandağ (Snake Mountain) 2,415 m (7,923 ft), which is visible from Nakhchivan City. According to legend, the cleft in its summit was formed by the keel of Noah's Ark as the floodwaters abated. Qazangödağ 3,829 m (12,562 ft) is another major peak.

Both the absolute minimum temperature (−33 °C or −27.4 °F) and the absolute maximum temperature (46 °C or 114.8 °F) were observed in Julfa and Ordubad.

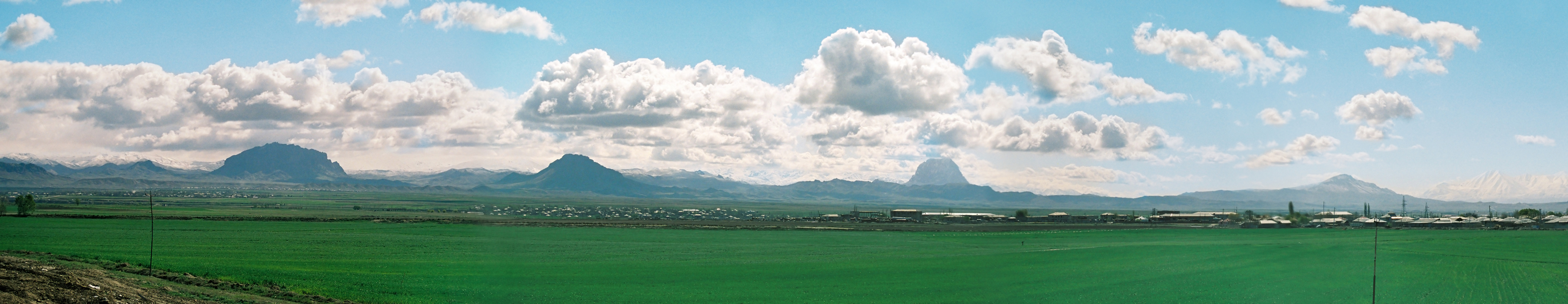
Nakchivan landscape

== Economy ==
=== Industry ===
Nakhchivan's major industries include the mining of minerals such as salt, molybdenum, and lead. Dryland farming, developed during the Soviet years, has allowed the region to expand into the growing of wheat (mostly cultivated on the plains of the Aras River), barley, cotton, tobacco, orchard fruits, mulberries, and grapes for producing wine. Other industries include cotton ginning/cleaning, silk spinning, fruit canning, meatpacking, and, in the drier regions, sheep farming. Processing of minerals, salt, radio engineering, farm ginning, preserving, silk products, meat, and dairy, bottling of mineral waters, clothing, and furniture are the principal branches of Nakhchivan's industry. The Nakhchivan Automobile Plant (Azerbaijani: Naxçıvan Avtomobil Zavodu, abbr. NAZ), is a prominent automobile manufacturer in the Nakhchivan Autonomous Republic. The economy suffered a severe blow in 1988 with the loss of access to both raw materials and markets, due to the First Nagorno-Karabakh War. Although new markets are emerging in Iran and Turkey, this isolation still persists to this day, impairing development. The economy of Nakhchivan is based on agriculture, mining, and food processing, however, 75% of the republic's budget is supplied by the central government in Baku.

The Republic is rich in minerals. Nakhchivan possesses deposits of marble, lime, and gypsum. The deposits of the rock salt are exhausted in Nehram, Nakhchivan, and Sustin. The important molybdenum mines are currently closed as a consequence of the exclave's isolation. There are a lot of mineral springs such as Badamli, Sirab, Nagajir, Kiziljir where water contains arsenic. About 90% of the agricultural land is now in private hands. However, agriculture has become a poorly capitalized, backyard activity. Production has dropped sharply and large-scale commercial agriculture has declined. Over two-thirds of the land are rocky slopes and deserts, therefore the area of arable lands is quite limited. The main crops – cotton and tobacco – are cultivated in the PriAraz plain, near Sharur and Nakhchivan City. Three-quarters of the grain production, especially winter wheat is concentrated on the irrigated lands of the Sharur plain and in the basin of the Nakhchivan river. Vine growing in Nakhchivan has an ancient tradition, in the Araz valley and foothills. Very hot summers and long warm autumns make it possible to grow such highly saccharine grapes as bayan-shiraz, tebrizi, shiraz. Wines such as "Nakhchivan" "Shahbuz", "Abrakunis", at "Aznaburk" are of reasonable quality and very popular. Fruit production is quite important, mainly of quince, pear, peach, apricot, fig, almonds, and pomegranate. Cattle ranching is another traditional branch of Nakhchivan farming. Due to the dry climate, pastures in Nakhchivan are unproductive, therefore sheep breeding prevails over other livestock production. Winter pastures stretch on the PriAraz plain, on the foothills and mountainsides to the altitude of 1,200 metres (3,900 ft). But the summer pastures go up on the high-mountain area to an altitude of 2,300–3,200 metres (7,500–10,500 ft). The most widespread sheep variety is "balbas". These sheep are distinguished by their productivity and snow-white silky wool which is widely used in the manufacture of carpets. Horned and small cattle are bred everywhere, especially in the environs of Sharur and Nakhchivan. Buffaloes are also bred here.

Although intentions to facilitate tourism have been declared by the government, it is still at best incipient. Until 1997 tourists needed special permission to visit, which has now been abolished, making travel easier. Facilities are very basic and heating fuel is hard to find in the winter, but the arid mountains bordering Armenia and Iran are magnificent. In terms of services, Nakhchivan offers very basic facilities and lacks heating fuel during the winter.

In 2007 the Poldasht-Shah Takhti Bridge, which connects Poldasht, West Azerbaijan Province, Iran, and Shah Takhti in Nakhchivan, was completed, allowing residents of the republic to access Azerbaijan proper via Iran without having to cross Armenian territory.

== International issues ==
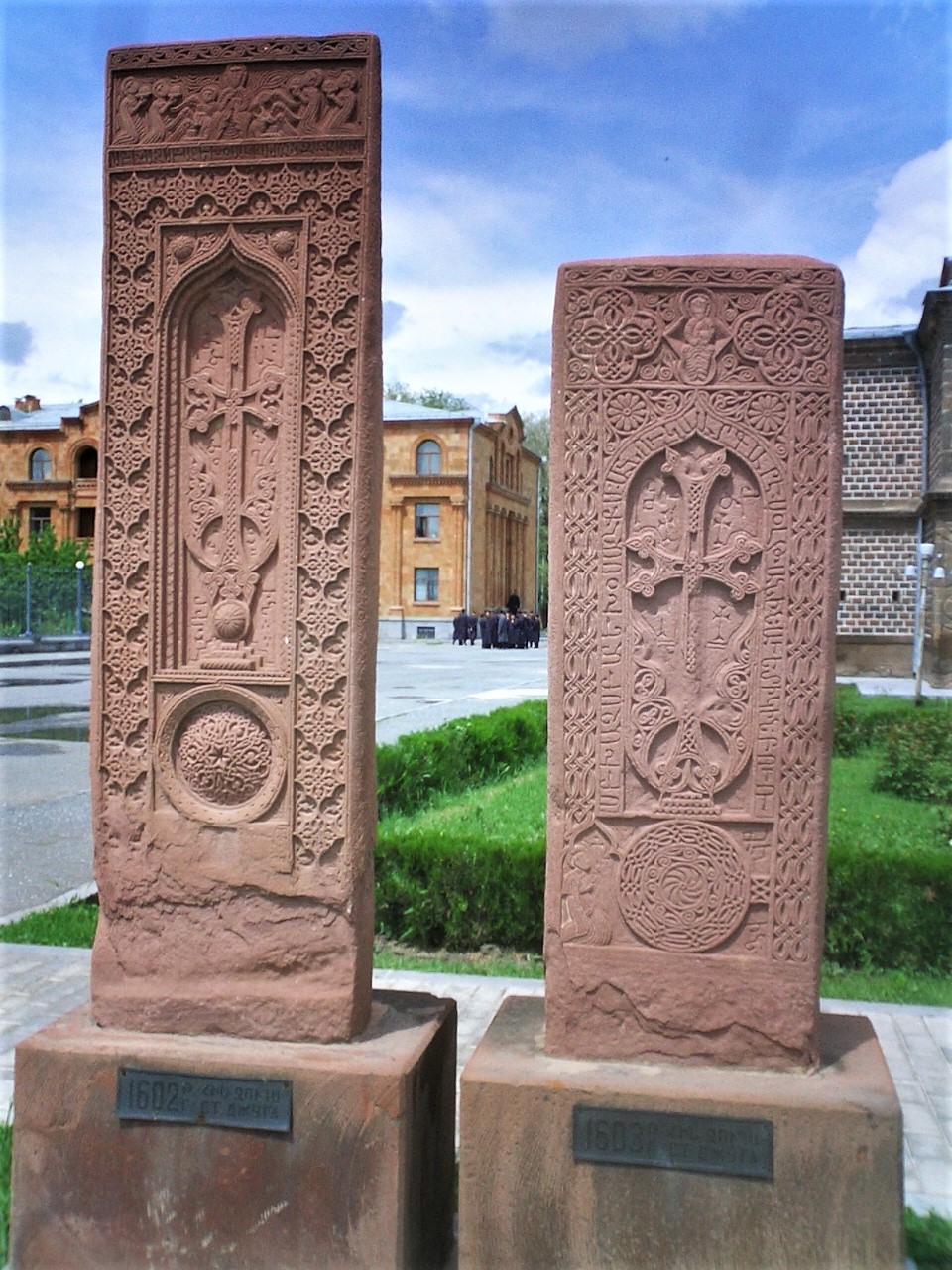
Examples of Armenian khachkars from Julfa

=== Destruction of Armenian cultural monuments ===
The number of named Armenian churches known to have existed in the Nakhchivan region is over 280. As early as 1648, French traveller Alexandre de Rhodes reported seeing more than ten thousand Armenian tombstones made of marble in Julfa. The number of ecclesiastical monuments still standing in Nakhchivan in the 1980s is estimated to be between 59 and 100. The author and journalist Sylvain Besson believe them to have all been subsequently destroyed as part of a campaign by the Government of Azerbaijan to erase all traces of Armenian culture on its soil.

When the 14th-century church of St. Stephanos at Abrakunis was visited in 2005, it was found to have been recently destroyed, with its site reduced to a few bricks sticking out of loose, bare earth. Similar complete destruction had happened to the 16th century St. Hakop-Hayrapet church in Shurut. The Armenian churches in Norashen, Kırna and Gah that were standing in the 1980s had also vanished.

The most publicised case of mass destruction concerns gravestones at a medieval cemetery in Julfa, with photographic, video and satellite evidence supporting the charges. In April 2006, The Times of London wrote about the destruction of the cemetery in the following way:

A Medieval cemetery regarded as one of the wonders of the Caucasus has been erased from the Earth in an act of cultural vandalism likened to the Taleban blowing up the Bamiyan Buddhas in Afghanistan in 2001. The Jugha cemetery was a unique collection of several thousand carved stone crosses on Azerbaijan's southern border with Iran. But after 18 years of conflict between Azerbaijan and its western neighbour, Armenia, it has been confirmed that the cemetery has vanished."

Armenians have long sounded the alarm that the Azerbaijanis intend to eliminate all evidence of the Armenian presence in Nakhchivan and, to this end, have been carrying out massive and irreversible destruction of Armenian cultural traces. "The irony is that this destruction has taken place not during a time of war but at a time of peace," Armenian Foreign Minister Vartan Oskanian told The Times. Azerbaijan has consistently denied these accusations. For example, according to the Azerbaijani ambassador to the US, Hafiz Pashayev, the videos and photographs "show some unknown people destroying mid-size stones", and "it is not clear of what nationality those people are", and the reports are Armenian propaganda designed to divert attention from what he claimed was a "state policy (by Armenia) to destroy the historical and cultural monuments in the occupied Azeri territories".

A number of international organizations have confirmed the complete destruction of the cemetery. The Institute for War and Peace Reporting reported on April 19, 2006, that "there is nothing left of the celebrated stone crosses of Jugha."

According to the International Council on Monuments and Sites (Icomos), the Azerbaijan government removed 800 khachkars in 1998. Though the destruction was halted following protests from UNESCO, it resumed four years later. By January 2003 "the 1,500-year-old cemetery had completely been flattened" according to Icomos. On December 8, 2010, the American Association for the Advancement of Science released a report entitled "Satellite Images Show Disappearance of Armenian Artifacts in Azerbaijan". The report contained the analysis of high resolution satellite images of the Julfa cemetery, which verified the destruction of the khachkars.

The European Parliament has formally called on Azerbaijan to stop the demolition as a breach of the UNESCO World Heritage Convention. According to its resolution regarding cultural monuments in the South Caucasus, the European Parliament "condemns strongly the destruction of the Julfa cemetery as well as the destruction of all sites of historical importance that has taken place on Armenian or Azerbaijani territory, and condemns any such action that seeks to destroy cultural heritage." In 2006, Azerbaijan barred a Parliamentary Assembly of the Council of Europe (PACE) mission from inspecting and examining the ancient burial site, stating that it would only accept a delegation if it also visited Armenian-occupied territory. "We think that if a comprehensive approach is taken to the problems that have been raised," said Azerbaijani foreign ministry spokesman Tahir Tagizade, "it will be possible to study Christian monuments on the territory of Azerbaijan, including in the Nakhchivan Autonomous Republic."

A renewed attempt was planned by PACE inspectors for August 29 – September 6, 2007, led by British MP Edward O'Hara. As well as Nakhchivan, the delegation would visit Baku, Yerevan, Tbilisi, and Nagorno Karabakh. The inspectors planned to visit Nagorno Karabakh via Armenia; however, on August 28, the head of the Azerbaijani delegation to PACE released a demand that the inspectors must enter Nagorno Karabakh via Azerbaijan. On August 29, PACE Secretary-General Mateo Sorinas announced that the visit had to be cancelled because of the difficulty in accessing Nagorno Karabakh using the route required by Azerbaijan. The Ministry of Foreign Affairs in Armenia issued a statement saying that Azerbaijan had stopped the visit "due solely to their intent to veil the demolition of Armenian monuments in Nakhijevan".

In 2022, the Cornell University-led monitoring group Caucasus Heritage Watch released a report detailing the "complete destruction of Armenian cultural heritage" in Nakhchivan starting the 1990s. According the report, out of 110 medieval and early modern Armenian monasteries, churches and cemeteries identified from archival sources, 108 were deliberately and systematically destroyed between 1997 and 2011. In some cases, such as the Saint Thomas Monastery in Yukhari Aylis (Agulis), mosques or other civic buildings were built on the site of the destroyed buildings.

=== Recognition of the Turkish Republic of Northern Cyprus ===
In the late 1990s the Supreme Assembly issued a non-binding declaration recognising the sovereignty of the self-proclaimed Turkish Republic of Northern Cyprus (TRNC) and calling upon Azerbaijan to do so. While sympathetic to the TRNC, Azerbaijan has not followed suit because doing so could prompt the Republic of Cyprus to recognise the self-proclaimed Nagorno-Karabakh Republic. Close relations between Nakhchivan and Turkey probably initiated this recognition.

== Culture ==
Nakhchivan is one of the cultural centers of Azerbaijan. In 1923, a musical subgroup was organized at the State Drama Theater (renamed the Nakhchivan Music and Drama Theater in 1965). The Aras Song and Dance Ensemble (established in 1959) is another famous group. Dramatic performances staged by an amateur dance troupe were held in Nakhchivan in the late 19th century. Theatrical art also greatly contributed to Nakhchivan's culture. The creative work of Jalil Mammadguluzadeh, Huseyn Javid, and Huseyn Arablinski (the first Azerbaijani theatre director) stemmed from Nakhchivan. The region has also produced noteworthy Armenian artists, too, such as Soviet actress Hasmik Agopyan. Nakhchivan has also at times been mentioned in works of literature. World-renowned Soviet composer Aram Khatchaturian, the Armenian Hovnatanian painter family, as well as the actor Yervand Manaryan, have shaped the cultural wealth of Nakchivan, too. Nizami, the Persian poet, once wrote:

که تا جایگه یافتی نخچوان
Oh Nakhchivan, respect you've attained,
بدین شاه شد بخت پیرت جوان
With this King in luck you'll remain.

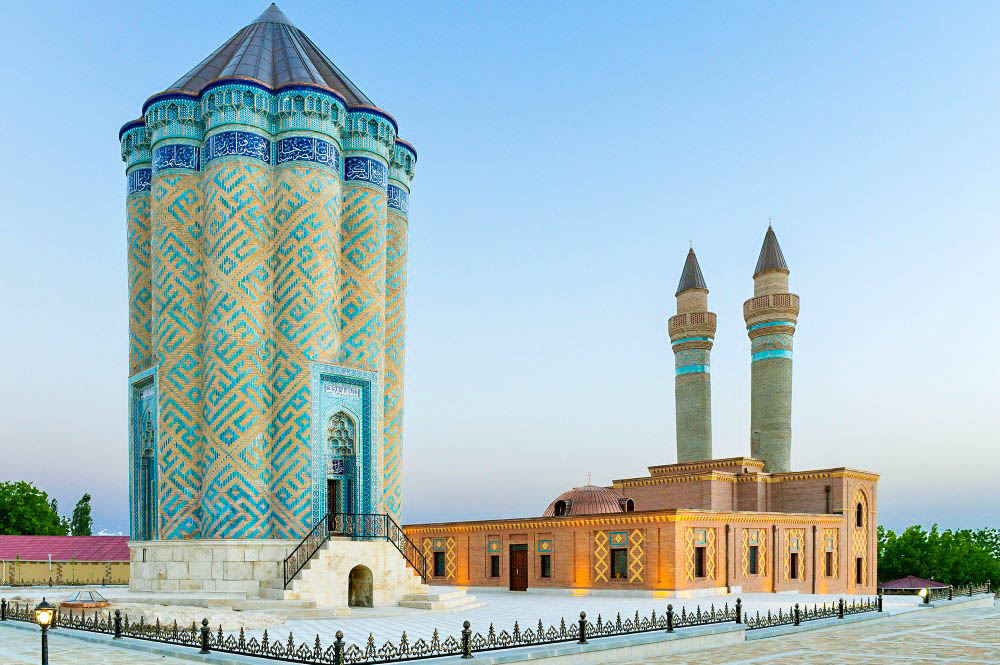
Garabaghlar Mausoleum

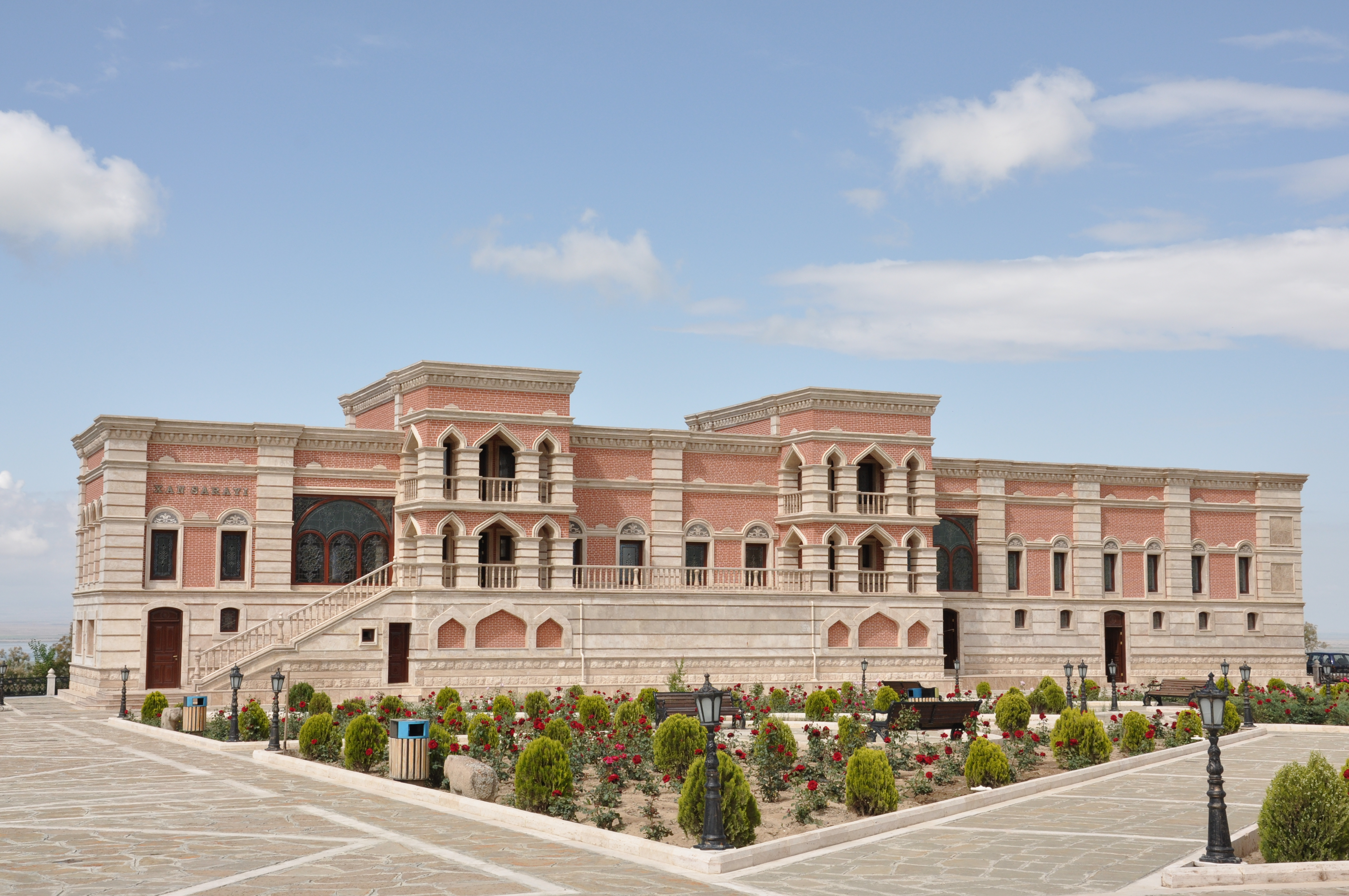
Palace of Nakhchivan Khans

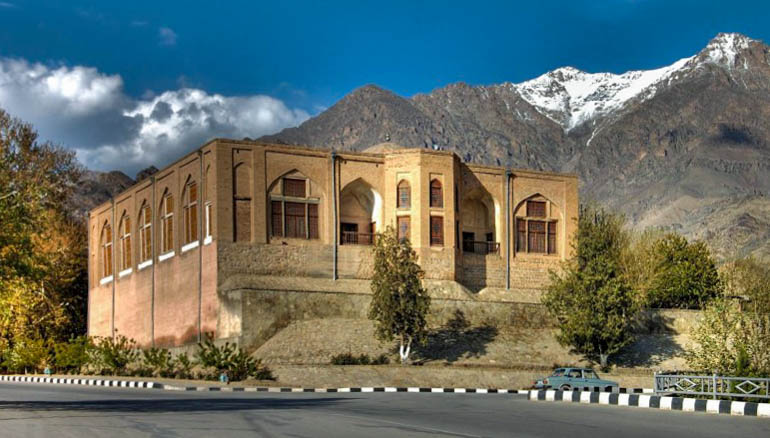
Juma Mosque, Ordubad

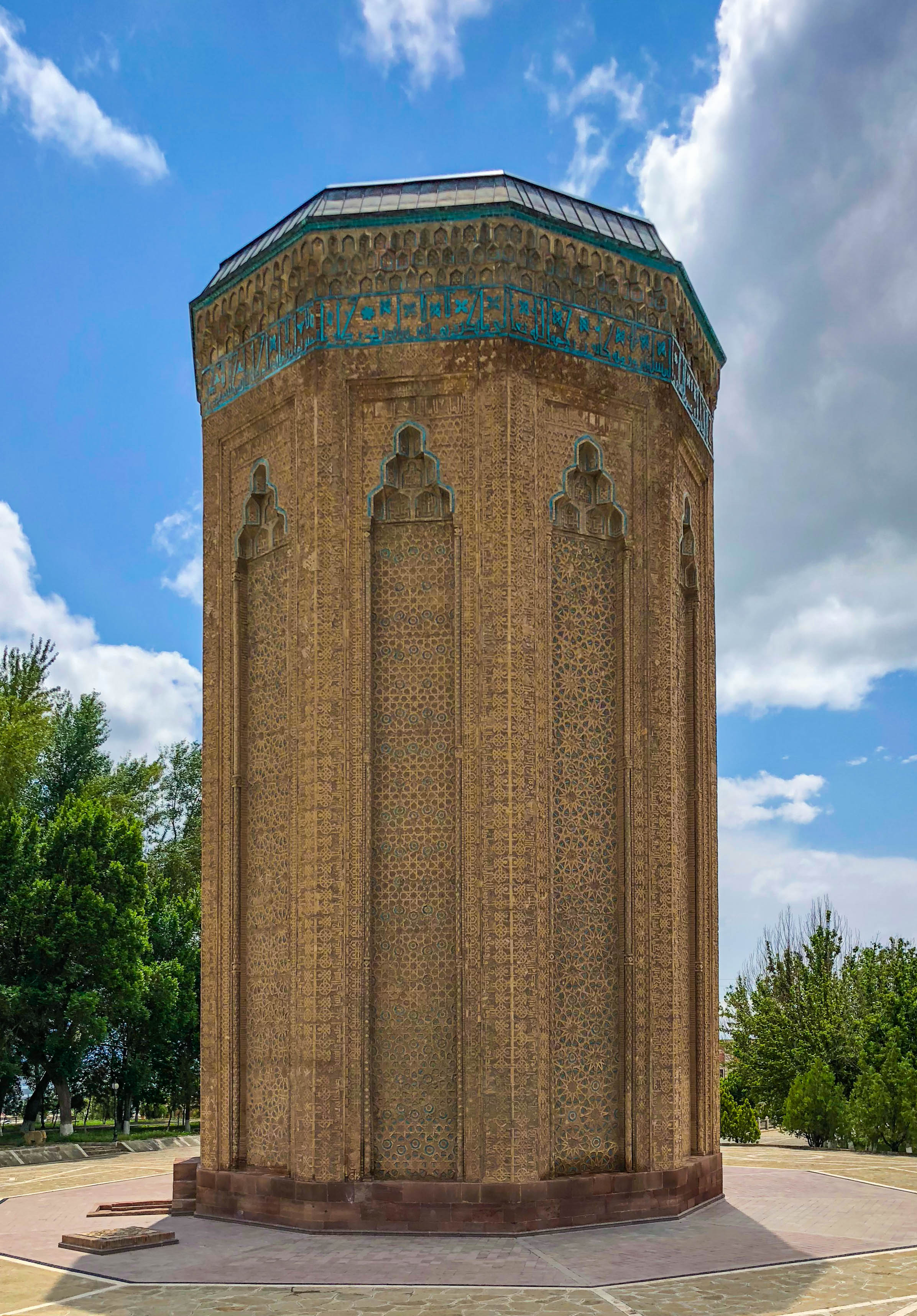
Momine Khatun Mausoleum

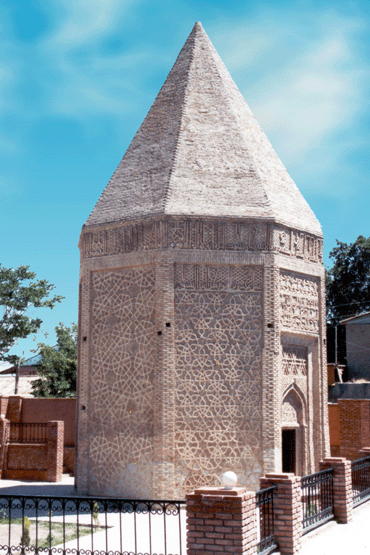
Yusif ibn Kuseyir Mausoleum

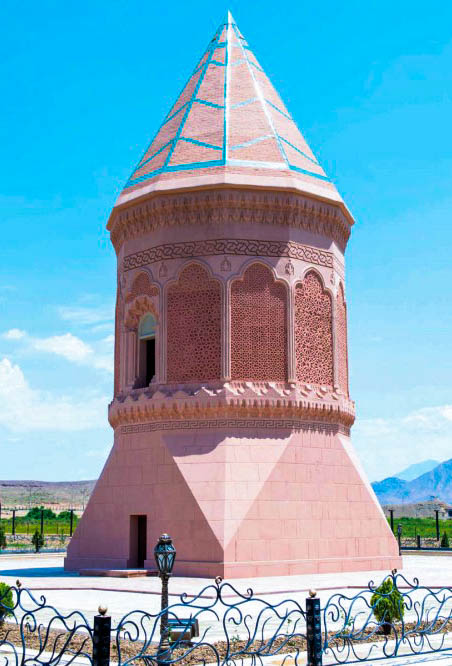
Juma Mosque, Ordubad

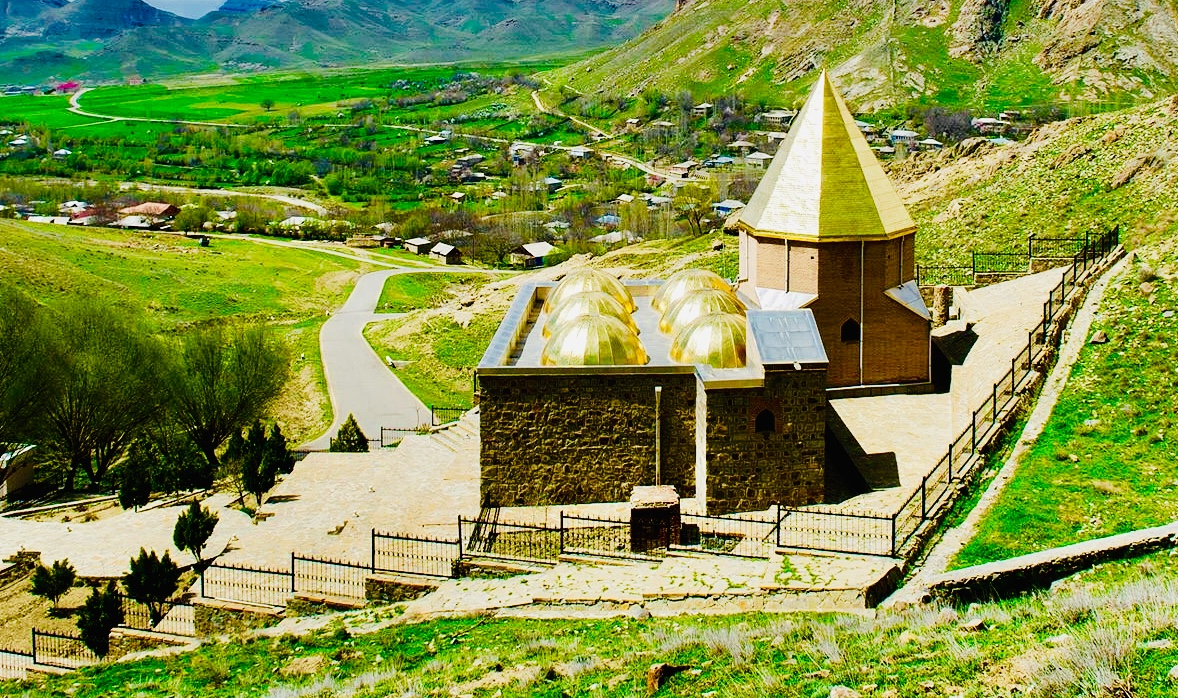
Khanegah tomb

=== Media ===
Radio broadcasting in Nakhchivan began on 1 April 1932 under Soviet rule. Television broadcasting began later on 12 March 1963, with the launch of Nakhchivan TV. State-owned radio and television broadcasting in the autonomous republic is managed by the State Committee for Television and Radio Broadcasting of the Nakhchivan Autonomous Republic. The Nukhchikhan Information Agency was founded in 2018. Under the Ministry of Communications and New Technologies, the Voice of Nakhchivan radio network was founded in 2001 and the Kanal 35 television station was founded in 2004. Both ceased operations in May 2023.

== Archaeology ==
The very early Kura-Araxes culture flourished in Nakhchivan before spreading to many other areas, as far as Palestine. This region reveals the genesis and chronology of this Chalcolithic and Early Bronze Age culture. Kültəpə is an important early Chalcolithic site in Nakhchivan. Another such site is Makhta Kultepe. Recent excavations at Ovcular Tepesi allow the dating of the initial stage of formation of Kura-Araxes culture to 4200–3400 BC.

The Naxçivan Archaeological Project is the first-ever joint American-Azerbaijani program of surveys and excavations, that was active since 2006. In 2010–11, they have excavated the large Iron Age fortress of Oğlanqala.

In Nakhchivan, there are also numerous archaeological monuments of the early Iron Age, and they shed a lot of light on the cultural, archaeological and agricultural developments of that era. There are important sites such as Ilikligaya, Irinchoy, and the Sanctuary of Iydali Piri in Kangarli region.

== Notable people ==
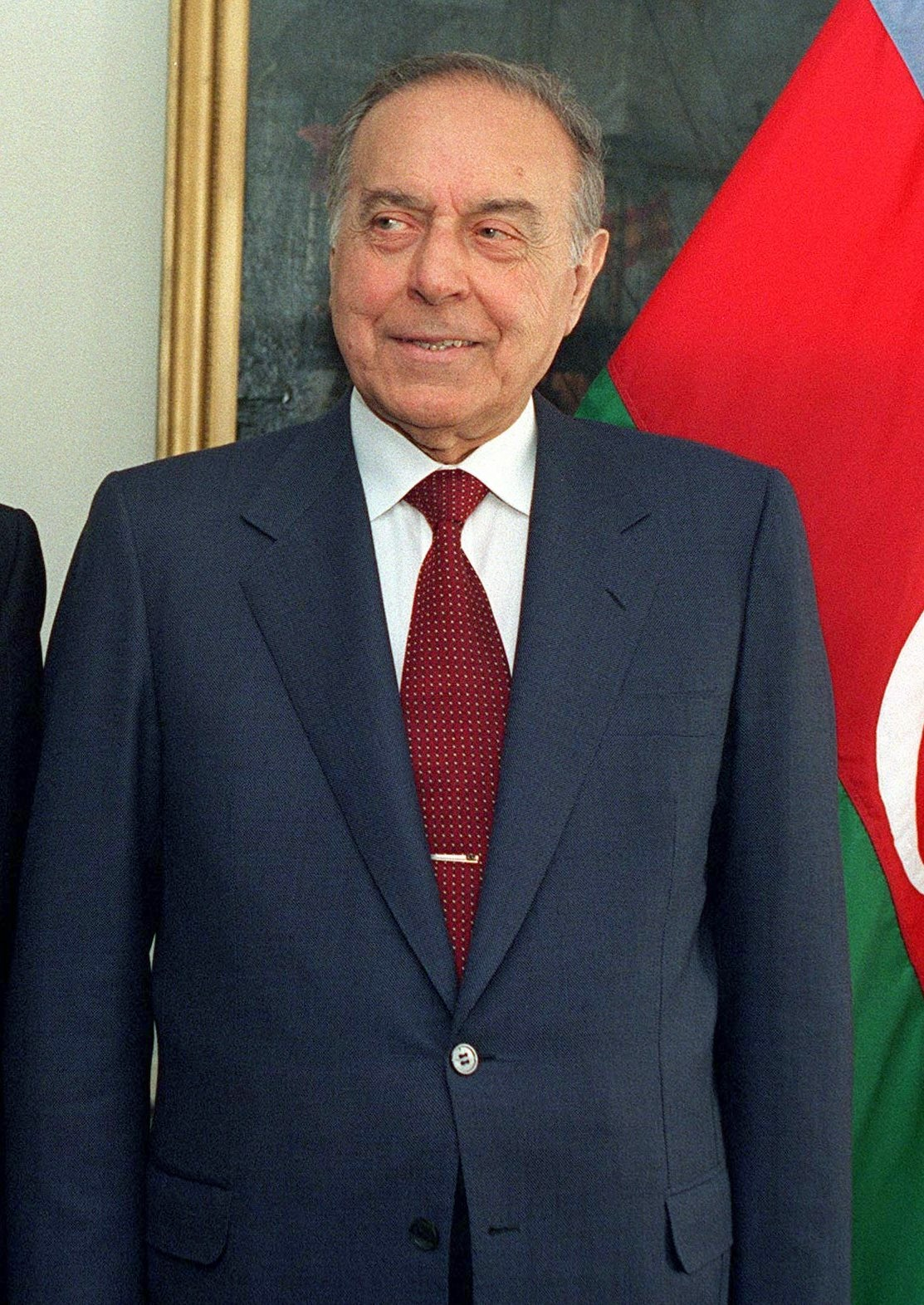
Heydar Aliyev, former President of Azerbaijan, was born in Nakhchivan.

=== Political leaders ===
- Heydar Aliyev, former President of Azerbaijan (1993–2003).
- Abulfaz Elchibey, former President of Azerbaijan (1992–1993).
- Rasul Guliyev, former speaker of the National Assembly of Azerbaijan (1993–1996) and opposition leader.
- Christapor Mikaelian, founding member of the Armenian Revolutionary Federation.
- Stepan Sapah-Gulian, leader of the Armenian Social Democrat Hunchakian Party (19th–20th century).
- Garegin Nzhdeh, famous Armenian revolutionary, military leader and political thinker.
- Vasif Talibov, chairman of the Supreme Assembly of the Nakhchivan Autonomous Republic from 1995 to 2022.

=== Religious leaders ===
- Alexander Jughaetsi (Alexander I of Jugha), Catholicos of All Armenians (1706–1714).

=== Military leaders ===
- Abdurahman Fatalibeyli, Soviet army major who defected to the German forces during World War II.
- Ehsan Khan Nakhchivanski, Russian military general.
- Huseyn Khan Nakhchivanski, Russian cavalry general and the only Muslim to serve as General-Adjutant of the Russian Tsar.
- Ismail Khan Nakhchivanski, Russian military general.
- Kelbali Khan Nakhchivanski, Russian military general.
- Jamshid Khan Nakhchivanski, Soviet and Azerbaijani military general.
- Yusif Mirzayev, National Hero of Azerbaijan.
- Maharram Seyidov, National Hero of Azerbaijan.
- Kerim Kerimov, National Hero of Azerbaijan.
- Sayavush Hasanov, National Hero of Azerbaijan.
- Mirasgar Seyidov, National Hero of Azerbaijan.
- Ali Mammadov, National Hero of Azerbaijan.
- Ibrahim Mammadov, National Hero of Azerbaijan.
- Amiraslan Aliyev, National Hero of Azerbaijan.

=== Writers and poets ===
- Huseyn Javid Rasizade, poet and playwright.
- Jalil Mammadguluzadeh, writer and satirist.
- Mammed Said Ordubadi, writer.
- Mammad Araz, poet.

=== Scientists ===
- Alec (Alirza) Rasizade, an American professor of history and political science, the author of the Rasizade's algorithm.
- Ruben Orbeli, Soviet archaeologist, historian and jurist, who was renowned as the founder of Soviet underwater archaeology.

=== Others ===
- Bahruz Kangarli, Azerbaijani painter.
- Haji Aliyev, Wrestling, World and European champion.
- Vladimir Makogonov, chess International Master and Grandmaster.
- Ajami Nakhchivani, architect and founder of the Nakhchivan school of architecture.
- Gaik Ovakimian, Soviet Armenian spy.
- Ibrahim Safi, Turkish artist.
- Natavan Gasimova, volleyball player
- Rza Tahmasib, Azerbaijani film director.

== Gallery ==
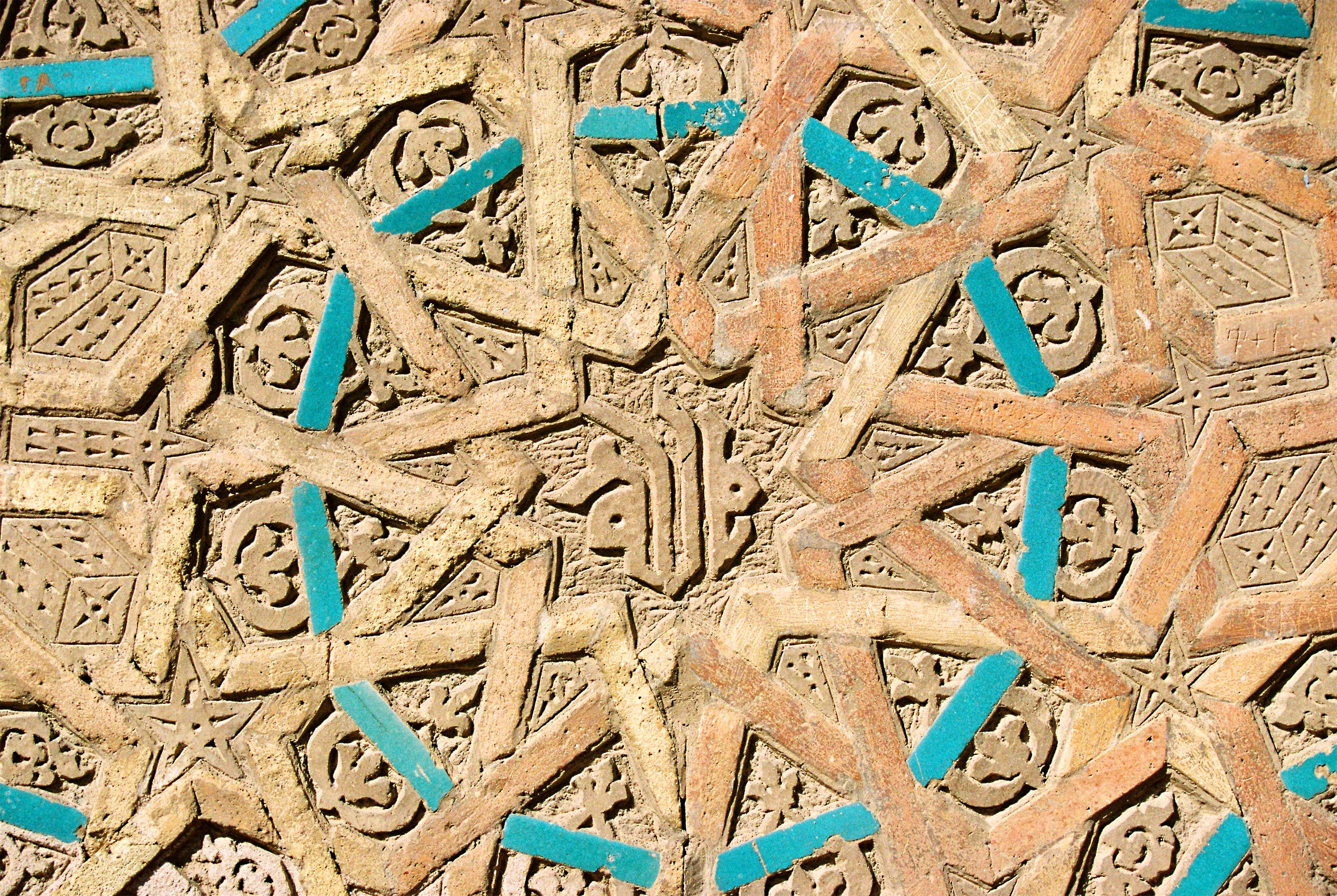
Brickwork and faience pattern on the Momine Khatun mausoleum

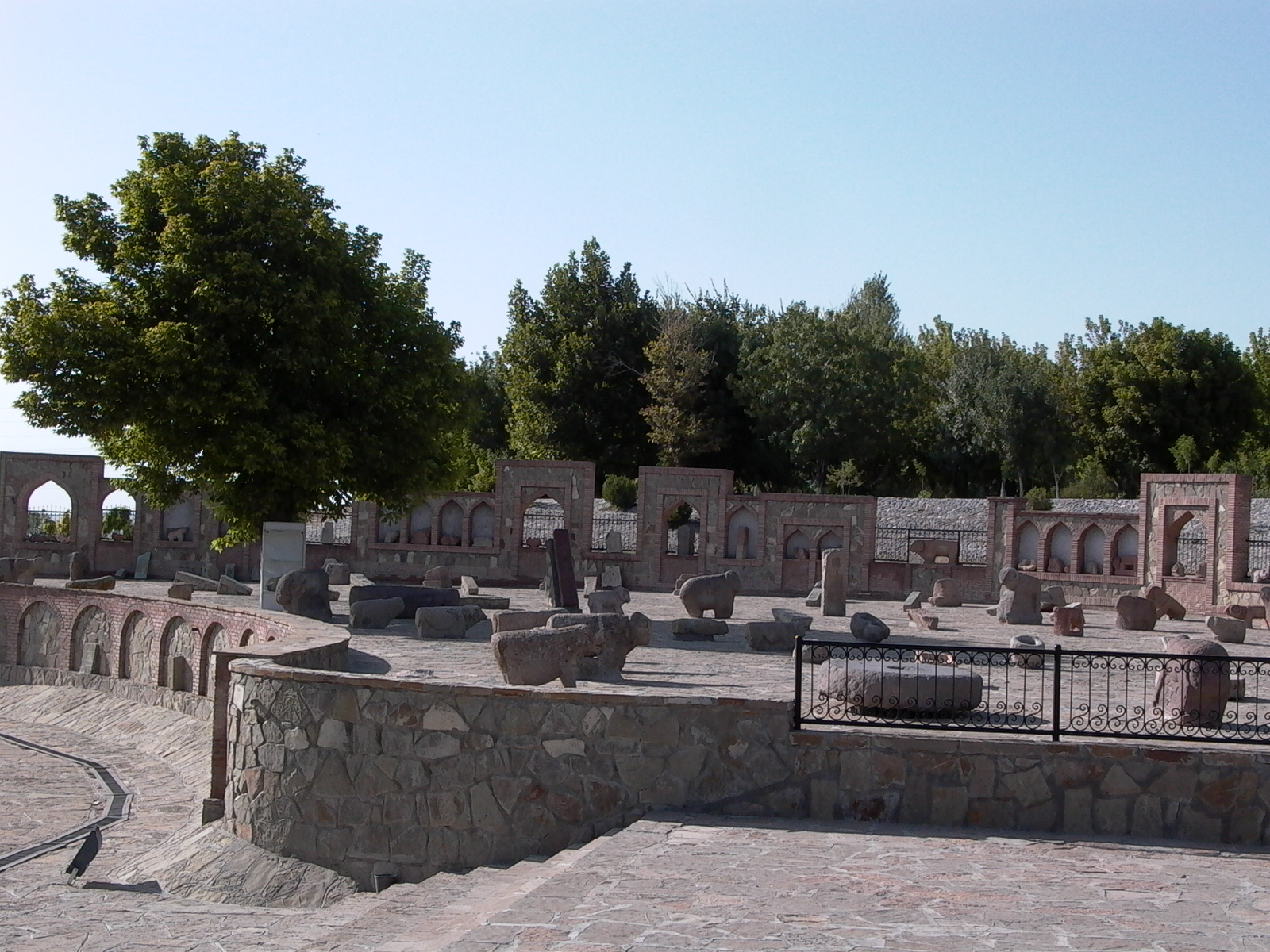
Medieval-period ram-shaped grave monuments collected near the Momine Khatun mausoleum

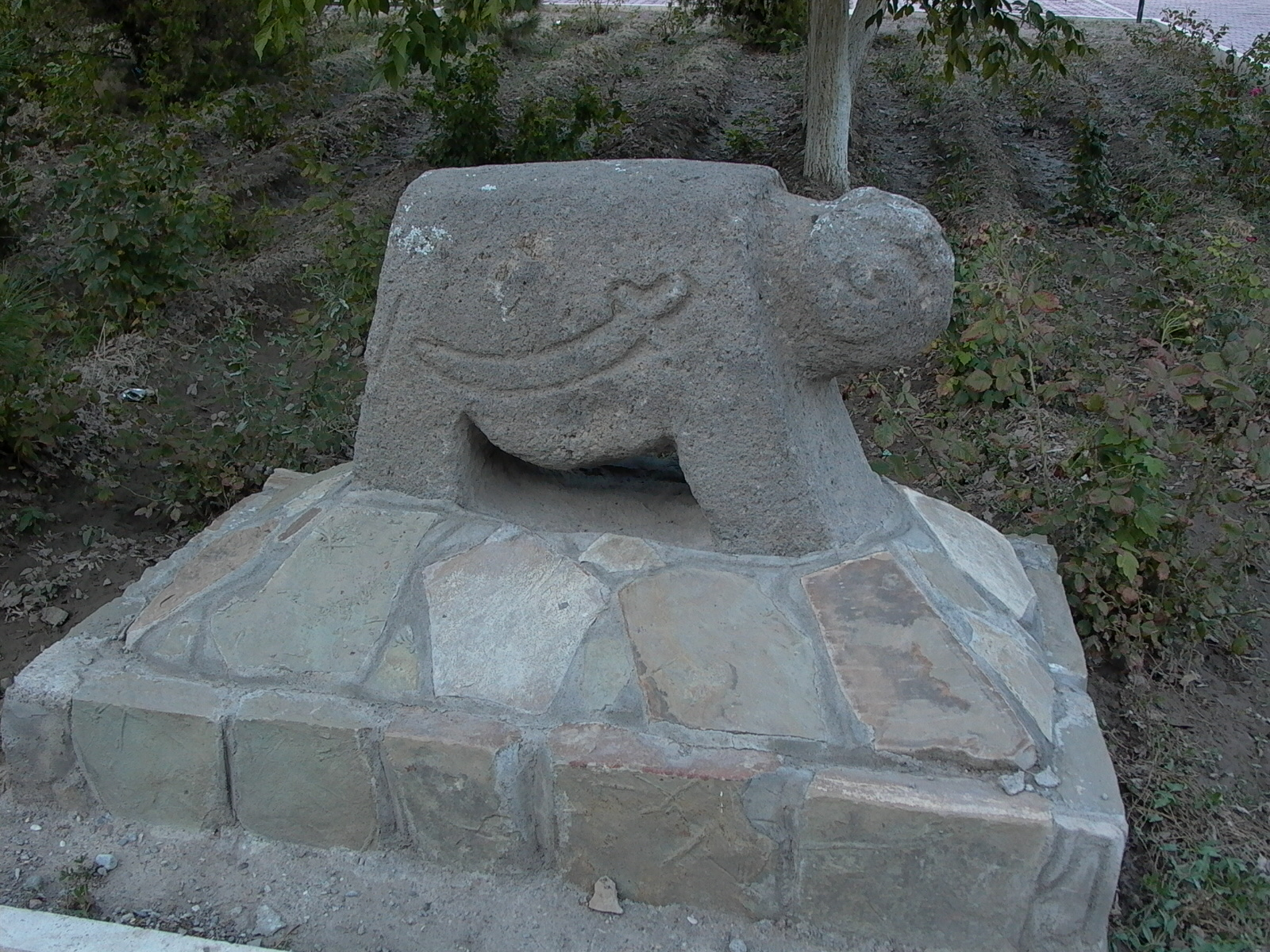
Ram-shaped grave monument embedded in concrete

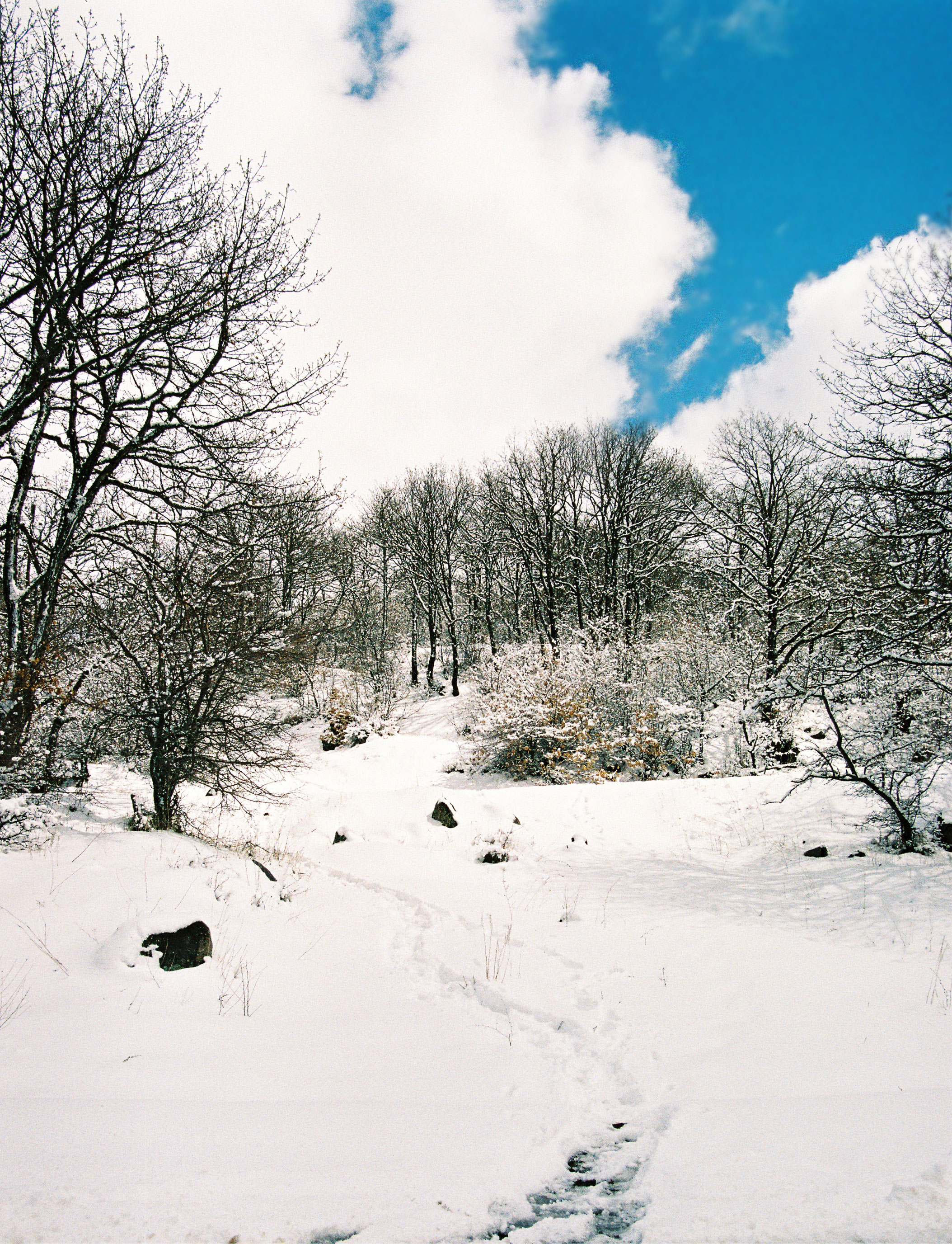
The Batabat region of Shakhbuz

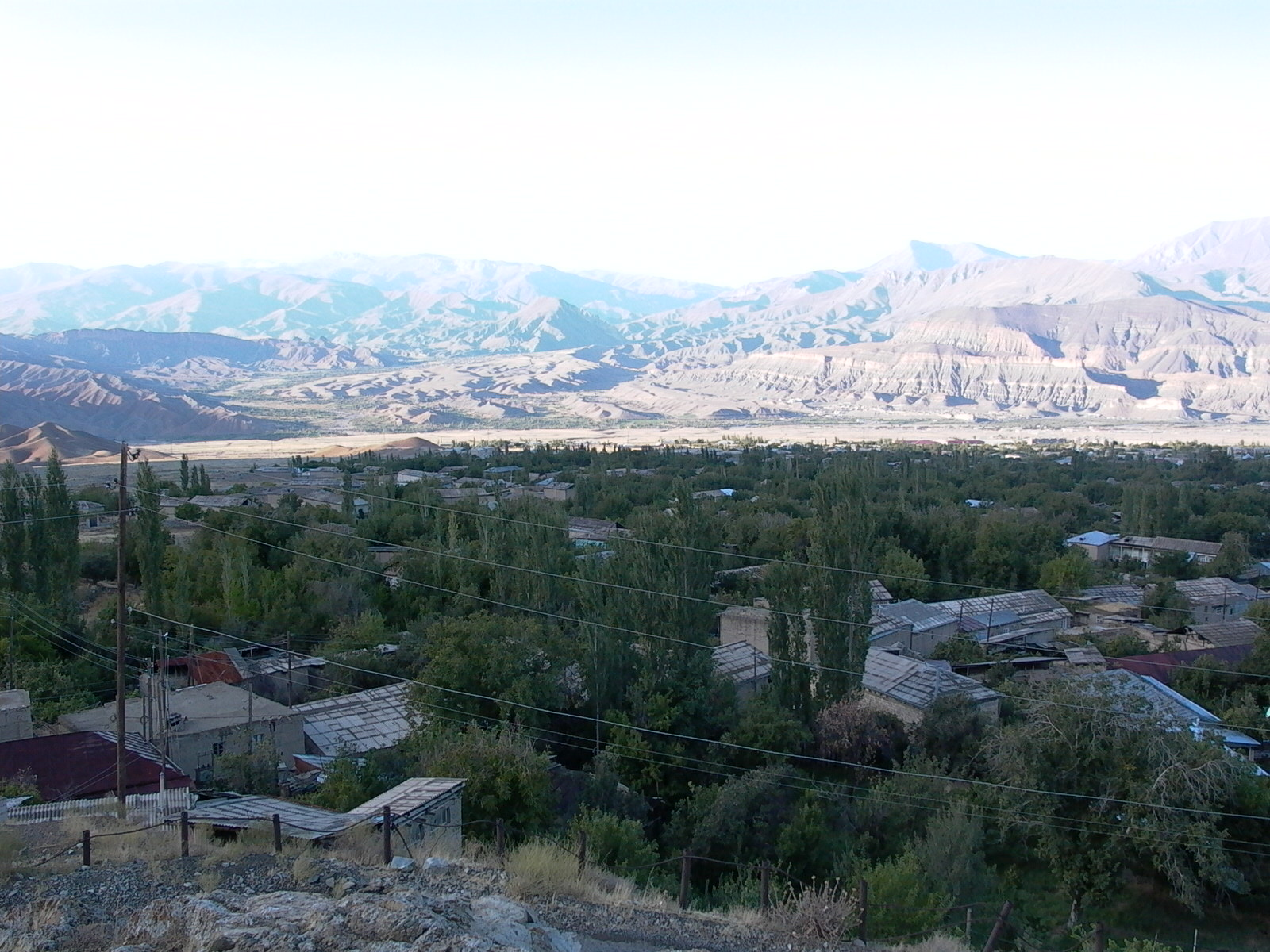
General view of Ordubad with a range of high mountains in neighboring Iran in the distance

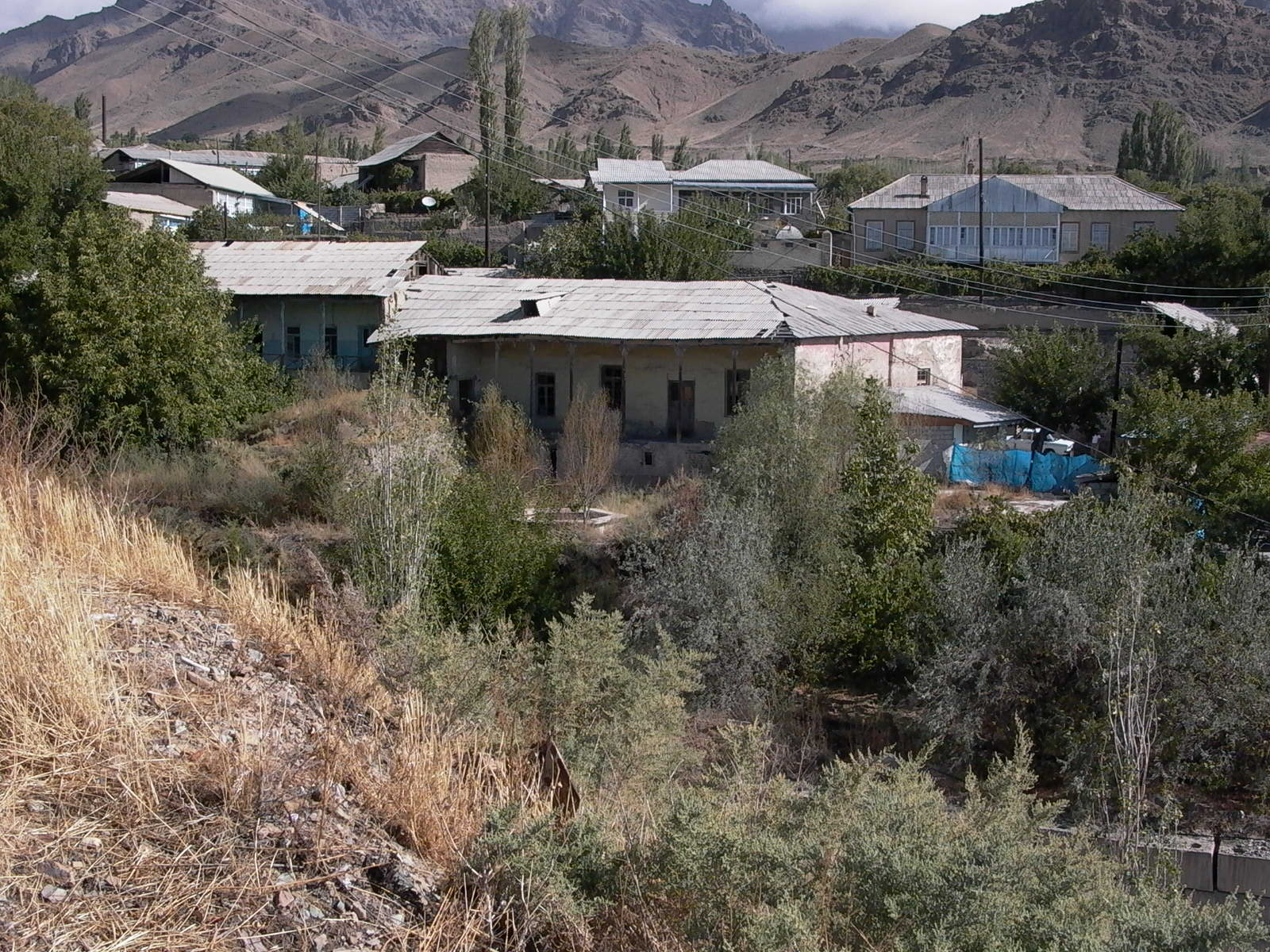
Houses in Ordubad photographed near the east bank of Ordubad-chay (also known as the Dubendi stream)

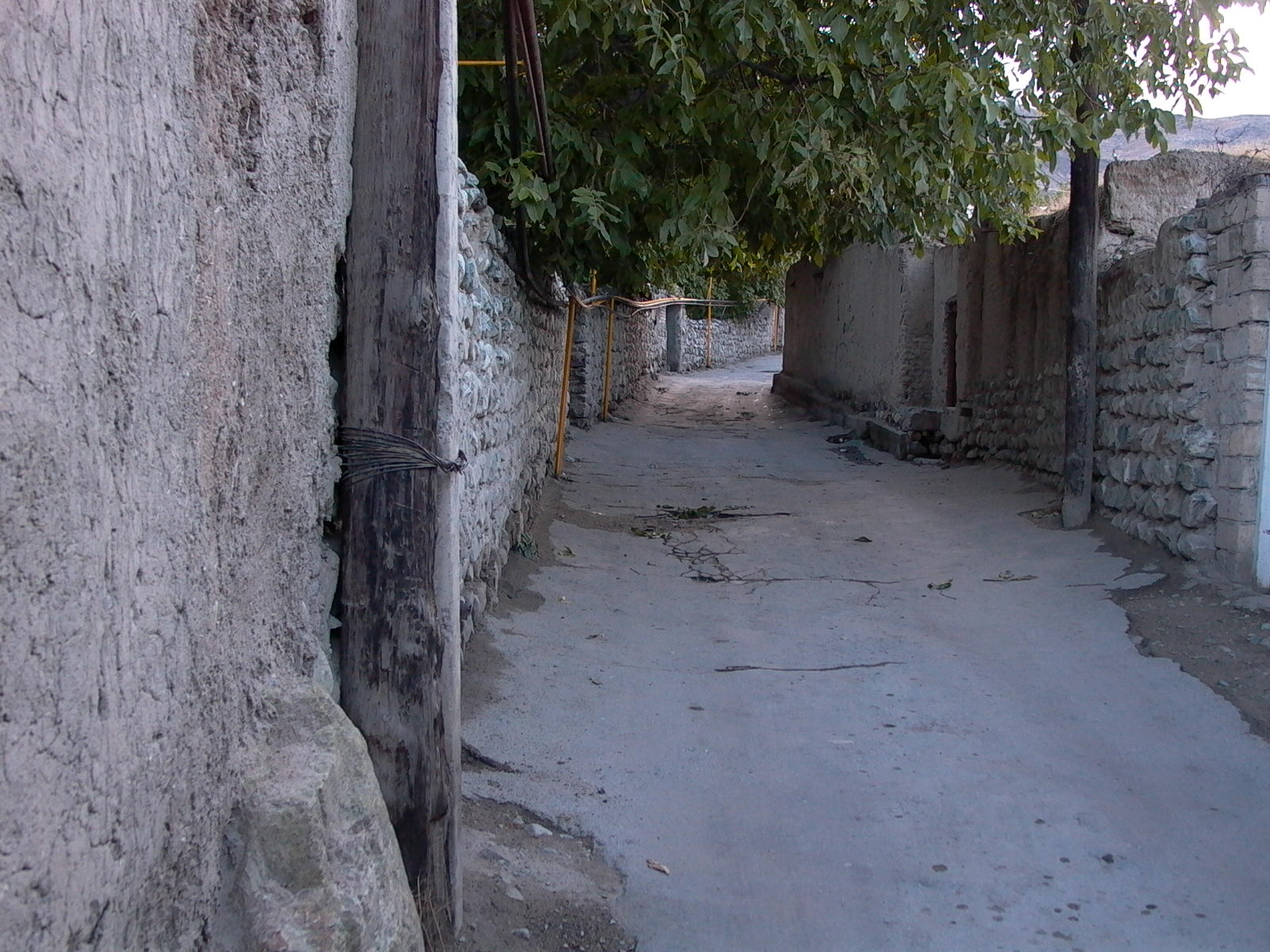
Narrow streets in Ordubad

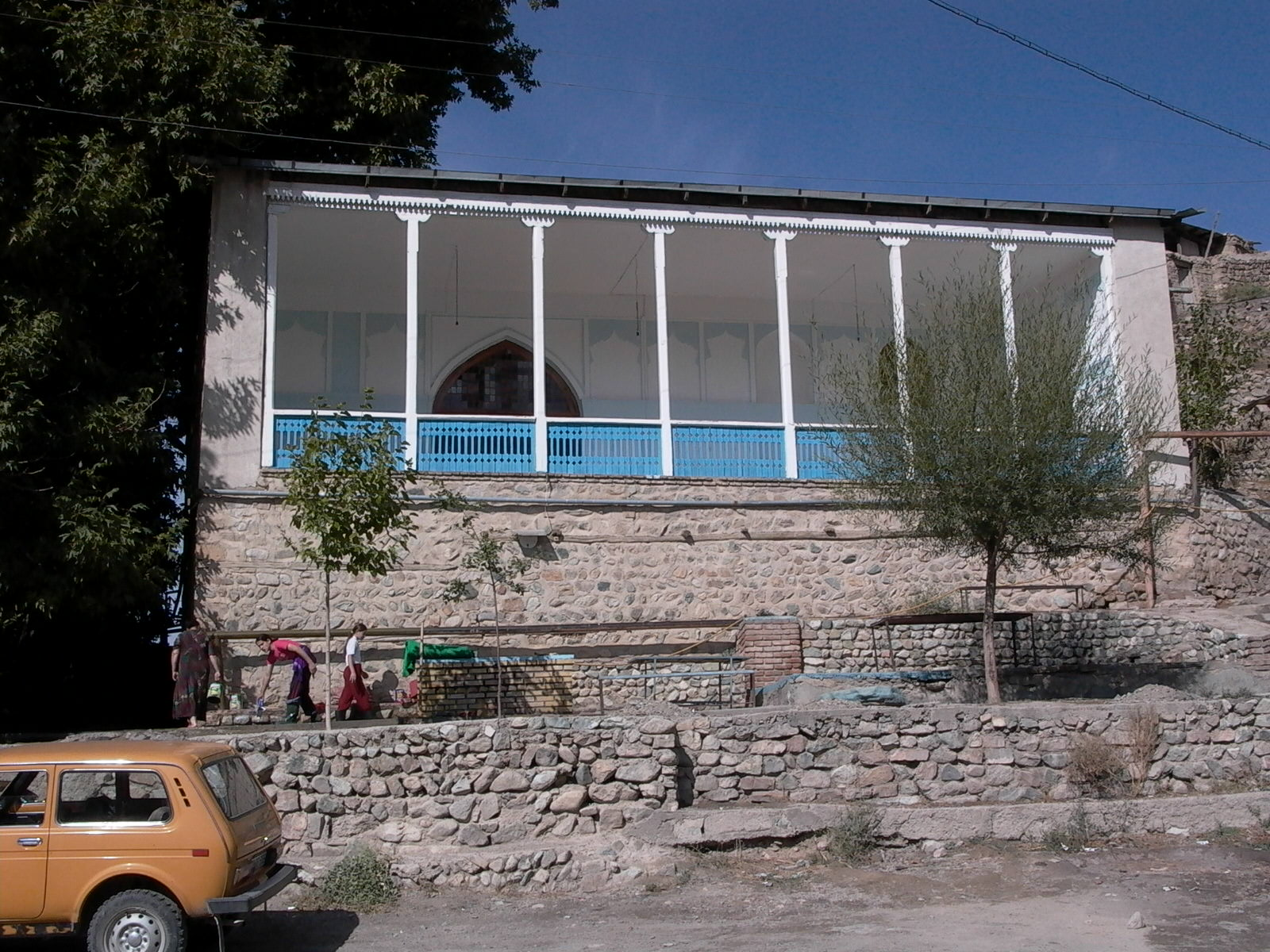
A mosque in a quarter of Ordubad

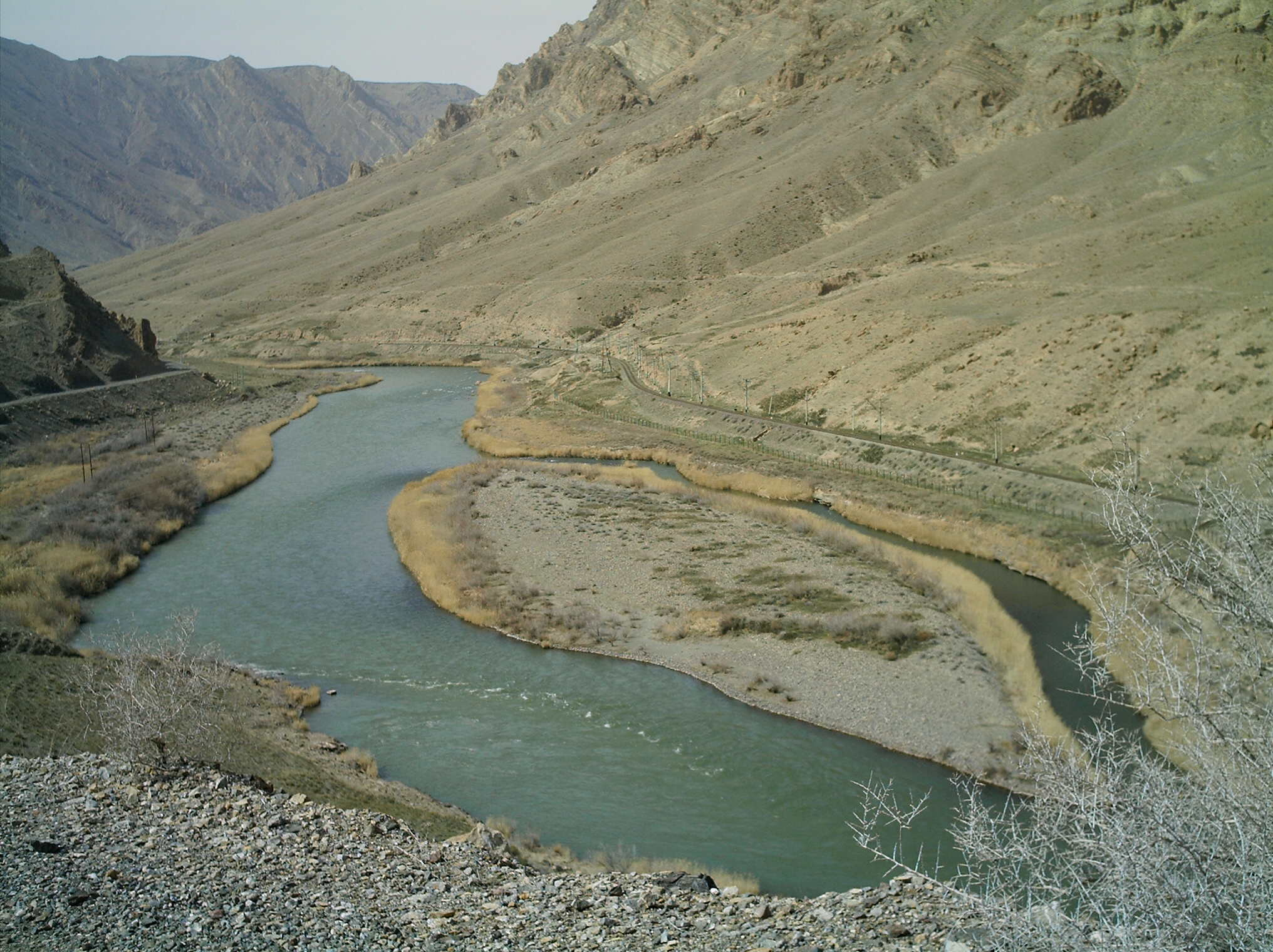
Aras River on the Iranian border near Julfa

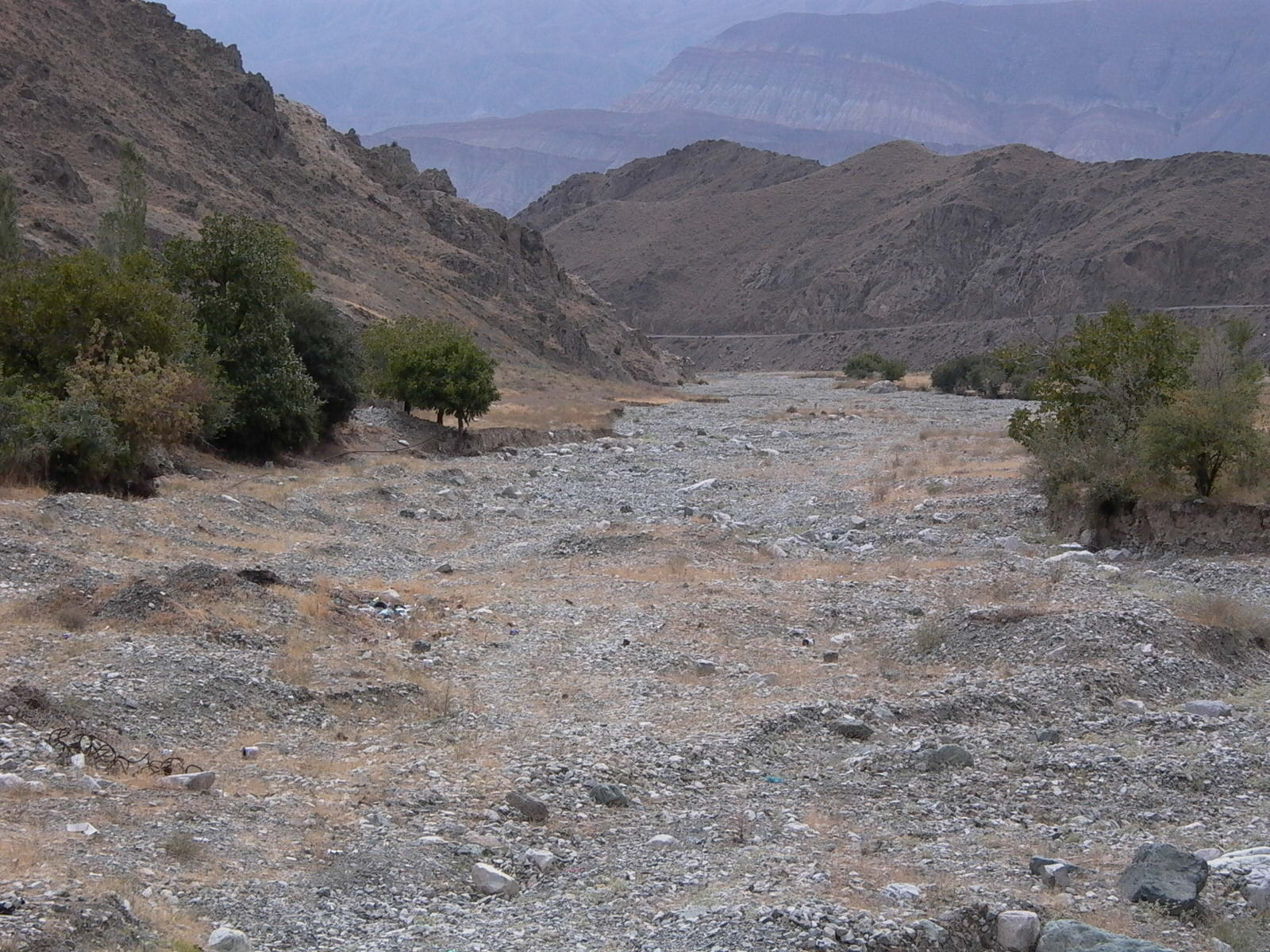
Mountainous terrain of Nakhchivan

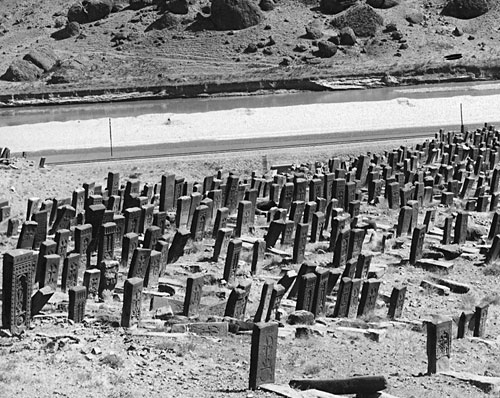
Armenian khachkar cemetery at Julfa

== See also ==
- List of Chairmen of the Supreme Majlis of Nakhchivan Autonomous Republic
- Nakhchivan Memorial Museum
- Nakhchivan culture
- Nakhchivan Garrison, the Azerbaijani Armed Forces stationed in Nakhchivan (also referred to as the Nakhchivan Army)
- Thamanin in southeast Turkey

== Sources ==
- Floor, Willem M. (2008). Titles and Emoluments in Safavid Iran: A Third Manual of Safavid Administration, by Mirza Naqi Nasiri. Washington, DC: Mage Publishers. p. 248. ISBN 978-1933823232.
