= Sisavan =

Sisavan Սիսավան
- Location within Armenia Location within Ararat
- Coordinates: 39°54′N 44°40′E
- Country: Armenia
- Province: Ararat
- Municipality: Vedi

Population (2011)
  - Total: 1,841
- Time zone: UTC+4
  - Summer (DST): UTC+5

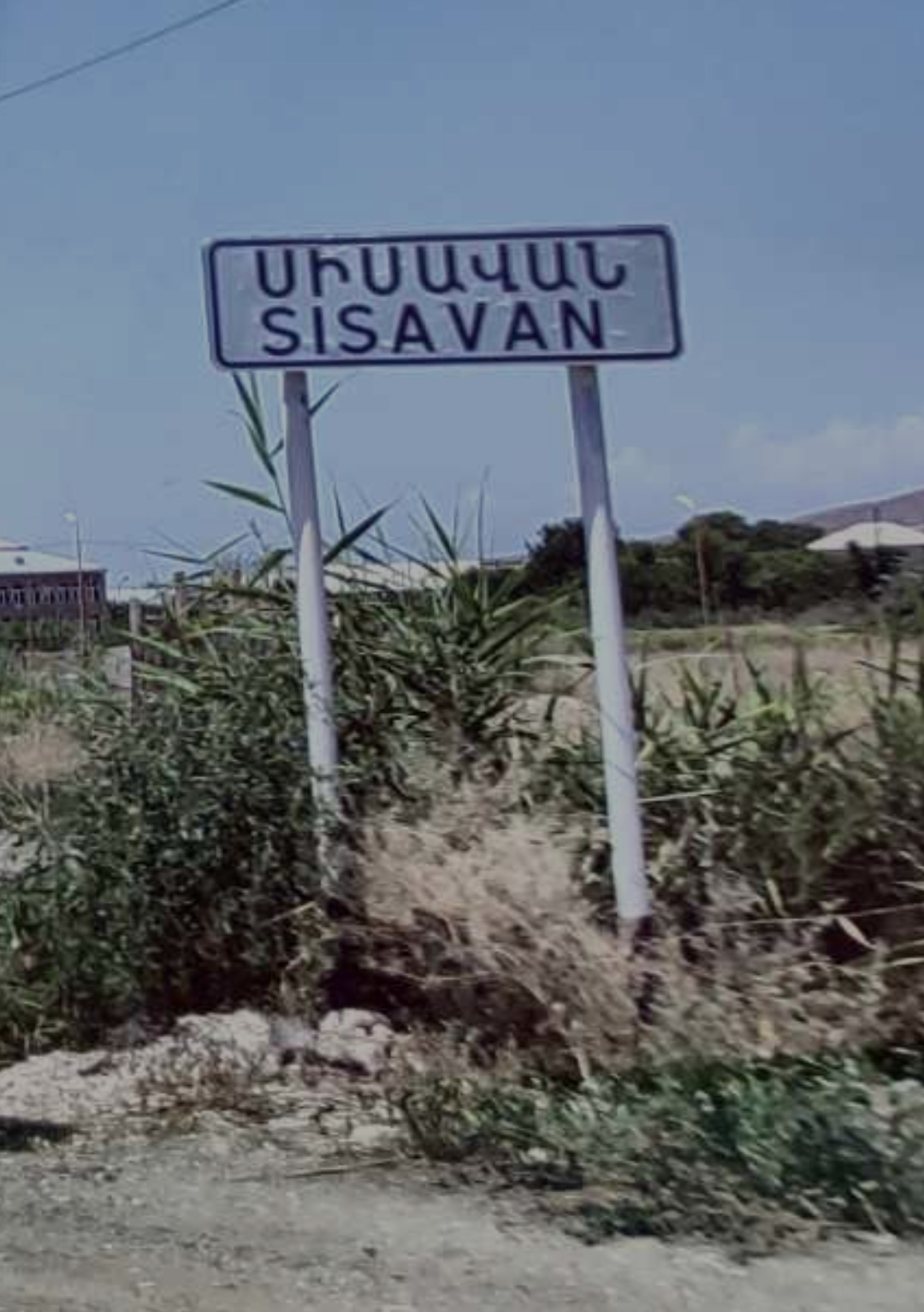
Sisavan Village entrance

Sisavan (Armenian: Սիսավան) is a village in the Vedi Municipality of the Ararat Province of Armenia.
