= Kərimbəyli =

Kərimbəyli or Kerimbeyli may refer to:

- Kərimbəyli, Barda, Azerbaijan
- Kərimbəyli, Fizuli, Azerbaijan
- Kərimbəyli, Babek, Nakhchivan, Azerbaijan
- Kərimbəyli, Sharur, Nakhchivan, Azerbaijan
- Kərimbəyli, Salyan, Azerbaijan
