= Ilhama Guliyeva =

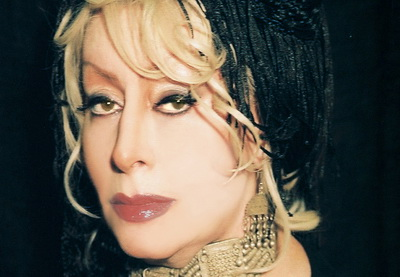

Background information
- Also known as: "Primadonna", "The Art Queen of the Turkic World"
- Born: 17 August 1943; Kurdakhany, Azerbaijani SSR, Soviet Union
- Died: 25 February 2016 (aged 72) Baku, Azerbaijan
- Genres: Classical, Azerbaijani folk music, mugham, art music
- Occupations: Singer (mezzo contralto), actress
- Years active: 1965–2016

Ilhama Mazahir gyzy Guliyeva (Azerbaijani: İlhamə Məzahir qızı Quliyeva; 17 August 1943 – 25 February 2016) was an Azerbaijani celebrity, actress, and singer of Azerbaijani folk and classical music. Throughout her active musical-stage career, Ilhama Guliyeva gained popular success in her respective genre of music and received such major state-level honors as Honored Artist of Azerbaijani SSR in 1982, People's Artist of the Republic of Azerbaijan in 1998, and People's Artist of the Republic of Dagestan in 2007.

== Biography ==
=== Early life and education ===
Ilhama Guliyeva was born on 17 August 1943 in Kurdakhany, Azerbaijani SSR. Her mother – Tukezban Ismayilova, was a popular Azerbaijani singer and khanende, and her father, Mazahir Guliyev, worked as a prosecutor in Lankaran. Due to his job appointment, Ilhama Guliyeva spent her very early years in Shaki city of Azerbaijan. However, when Ilhama reached the age of six, her parents divorced. Ilhama Guliyeva's mother, moving to Baku, married a famous Azerbaijani tar player – Həbib Bayramov, who later became a supportive stepfather that actively engaged in bringing up and educating Ilhama Guliyeva.

At this early age, she was enrolled in a 7-year musical school for piano training in Baku. As Guliyeva finished both musical and high schools, she was keen to build her career in the musical field. Nevertheless, young Ilhama faced definitive dissent from her parents. Considering the difficulties of music, they tried to inspire her to master another art. Therefore, she entered the faculty of philology of the Azerbaijan State University in 1960 and continued non-musical studies in subsequent years. In 1964, Ilhama Guliyeva graduated from the university, but like every talented person with high musical intelligence, young Guliyeva could not get away from music.

=== Early musical career ===
In 1963, with the support of Ziniat Alizadeh, who was in close relations with Guliyeva's family, she starts performing at the university's "Sevinj" pop ensemble. As Guliyeva's parents still oppressed her passion for music, these musical activities were kept secret from her family. In 1964, a competition of young talents from all over the world was held in Moscow. At the request of Mrs. Zinyat, Ilhama Guliyeva gets permission from her family and flies to Russia. Her family thought she was going to the festival as a spectator. Competing with young singers from many countries, Ilhama Guliyeva performs the songs of Rauf Hajiyev and Tofig Guliyev. As Guliyeva becomes the winner of the competition, she returns to Baku and gets invited to perform at the orchestra of the Azerbaijan State Television and Radio Broadcasting Company (AzTV). Starting from 1965 until 1970, Ilhama Gulliyeva started performing songs composed by Khayyam Mirzazade, Tofig Bakikhanov and Emin Sabitoglu in various genres of pop music, such as slow rock, jazz, R & B, soul and blues, as a soloist of the orchestra headed by Tofiq Əhmədov.

=== 1970s – 1980s ===
From 1970 until 1980, Ilhama Guliyeva performed at various stages as a soloist of the Azerbaijan State Philharmonic Hall. In 1972, "The Evening of Azerbaijani Composers" is held in the House of the Unions in Moscow, where Guliyeva performs several songs. After the concert, a prominent Azerbaijani composer Fikrat Amirov meets with Guliyeva and promises to compose art songs for her. Such songs as "Mən səni araram", "Göy Göl", "Gülür ellər gülür", "Gülərəm gülsən", "Toy mahnısı/Toydur bugün" and "De görüm neyləmişəm" became wonderful musical outputs of their cooperation, which went down in history of Azerbaijani music since then. Each of these songs is accompanied by folk instruments and orchestra, and has its own unique and colorful shades peculiar to Azerbaijani folk music. In the late 1970s, accompanied by the Musical ensemble "Dan Ulduzu", which was headed by Gulala Aliyeva, Ilhama Guliyeva performed many art songs of such outstanding Azerbaijani composers as Oqtay Kazımi, Oqtay Rəcəbov, Ramiz Mirişli, Arif Malikov, Ahmad Bakikhanov etc. Since then, Ilhama Guliyeva has gone on tours to foreign countries (England, Spain, Denmark, Turkey, (Germany, etc.) and represented Azerbaijani music on the world stage.

=== 1990s – 2000s ===
After the death of Habib Bayramov in 1994, Tükazban İsmayılova stopped performing and quit the musical stage. This heavily affects Ilhama Guliyeva, and she quits singing for a short period of time. After several years, Guliyeva starts to cooperate with an Azerbaijani composer, Faiq Sücəddinov and performs such popular Azerbaijani lyrical songs as "Neylərsən", "Kaman", "Bilsən necə darıxmışam" etc. In the beginning of the first decade of the 2000s, Guliyeva performed such songs as "Gedirəm", "Unut Məni", "Unuda bilməzsən" and "Yaşın nə fərqi var ki?/Love knows no age" which became appellative and the most popular song of Guliyeva's repertoire. This and other series of lyrical songs of Guliyeva contributed to transformation of Azerbaijani music. Since the beginning of the second decade of the 2000s, Guliyeva became the venerable elderly artist in the field of music in Azerbaijan, and young artists began making cover versions of art songs that she used to sing.

=== Socio-political activity ===
In the beginning of the 2000s, Ilhama Guliyeva publicly supported a new candidate for presidency – Ilham Aliyev. She gives concerts in the regions of Azerbaijan, runs her propaganda, and makes a worthy contribution to Ilham Aliyev's successful election. Moreover, in 2002, Guliyeva received the status of "International Cultural Executor" at the World Women's Congress in Beirut, the title of "The Art Queen of the Turkic World" in Turkey and four Humay Awards in Azerbaijan. Since 2003, together with a group of intelligent Azerbaijani women, Ilhama Guliyeva has participated in several UN Geneva meetings and defended the rights of Azerbaijani women and children who had been affected by the Nagorno-Karabakh conflict. In 2004, at various conferences, symposiums, and protest rallies in Goteborg, Strasbourg, Paris, Istanbul and in front of the building of European Parliament in Brussels, Guliyeva had comprehensive public speeches on the Armenian occupation of internationally recognized Azerbaijani territories. As the result of active socio-political participation, Guliyeva was elected as the president of the "Academy of Culture" under the World Congress of Azerbaijanis/Dünya Azərbaycanlıları Konqresi in 2004. In 2007, at the headquarters of the Universal Peace Federation in Washington DC, Guliyeva received the status of Goodwill Ambassador.

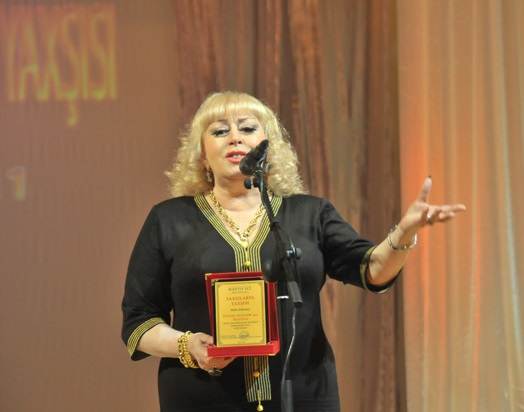
Ilhama Guliyeva receives "Yaxşıların Yaxşısı / Best of the Bests" Award, 2011.

== Personal life ==
Ilhama Guliyeva created a short-term family life with Faig Mirmohsunov in the 1980s. During this very short marriage period, she adopted the surname of her spouse. However, she ended this marriage shortly and returned to her original last name. Moreover, Guliyeva adopted a child—Orkhan Nadirov, who is claimed to be a grandson of Guliyeva's aunt.

== Public image ==
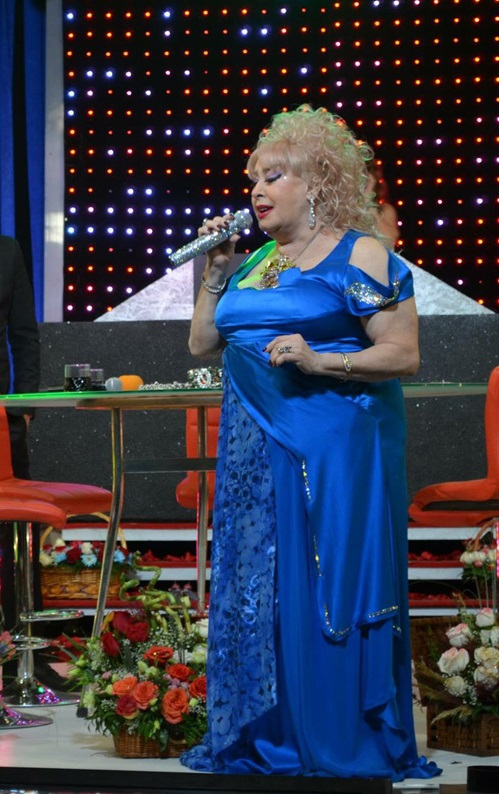
Ilhama Guliyeva at the TV Show "A-dan Z-yə". ANS TV studio, 2015.

Ilhama Guliyeva was a musical artist with a flamboyant personality. Though Guliyeva was respected for her voice, she faced public criticism and dissent for her personality. The major segment of Azerbaijani society is conservative with traditional values, yet Guliyeva was liberal and known to have love affairs in the 1980s and 90s.

Guliyeva was hegemonic, loved glory and honor, as well as demanded respectful attitude from everyone. This made her get into numerous conflicts with many other musical artists of Azerbaijan. Her major disputes were with such Azerbaijani singers as Nazpəri Dostəliyeva, Elza Seyidcahan, Aygün Kazımova and Brilliant Dadashova. Although she had a good and friendly relationship with all her colleagues at the end of her life, the only artist with whom she had not put up since the beginning of her musical career was another People's Artist of Azerbaijan Flora Kerimova. Despite that in 1995, during the joint interview with Kerimova and Guliyeva, they claimed not to be rivals since the genres of music they performed were different, it is not a secret that the issues as "who would go on stage to perform first" or "who would record a song of popular composer before anyone else" were ones of the main causes of their enmity. Since Kerimova went on streets against newly elected Azerbaijani government in 2003, she became unwelcomed and later left her active musical career. However, as TV channels were inviting Kerimova to talk shows, she used to insult Guliyeva, naming her a "disgrace to the musical stage and art, as well as to the Azerbaijani nation". Yet, while Guliyeva in her public and TV speeches held Kerimova in high esteem, Kerimova's attitude towards Guliyeva didn't change throughout time.

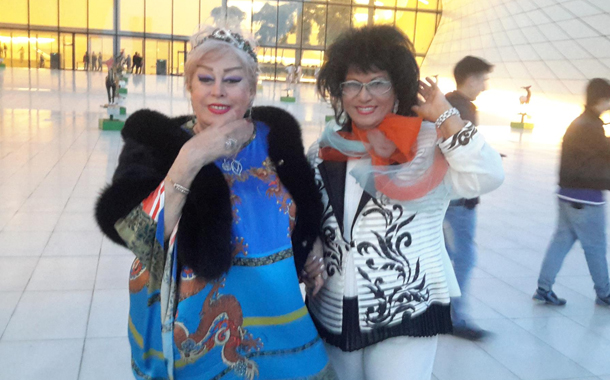
Ilhama Guliyeva (left) and Zeynab Khanlarova (right) at the Heydar Aliyev Center, Baku, 2015.

== Death ==
Starting in 2016, Ilhama Guliyeva had heart failure symptoms. Full of vigor and enthusiasm, Ilhama Guliyeva died of thromboembolism on 25 February 2016. Despite the fact that ambulance service arrived on time, her health condition had already deteriorated. On 26 February 2016, Ilhama Guliyeva was buried next to her mother Tükazban Ismayılova and stepfather Həbib Bayramov in the Second Alley of Honor in Baku. The reason of the death of Ilhama Guliyeva was investigated and revealed by the Court of Medical Expertise and Pathological Anatomy of Azerbaijan.

As a sign of respect towards Guliyeva's musical creativity, such high-ranking Azerbaijani social and political figures as President Ilham Aliyev, Prime Minister Artur Rasizade, Speaker of the National Assembly Ogtay Asadov, Minister of Culture and Tourism Abulfaz Garayev, People's Artist of USSR and Azerbaijan Zeynab Khanlarova, composer Eldar Mansurov and others signed the obituary and expressed their condolences to Guliyeva's family members:

Obituary, 2016: The memory of the well-known Azerbaijani singer Ilhama Guliyeva will always remain in the hearts of those who loved such sincere person and respected her musical creativity.

== Filmography ==
1. Toyda görüş, (watch concert film, 1970)
2. Çiçək yağışı, (film, 1971)
3. Göy göl, (concert film, 1973)
4. Mahnı qanadlarında, (watch concert film, 1973)
5. Payız melodiyaları, (watch concert film, 1974)
6. Oxuyan ürəkdir, (film, 2003)
7. Adam ol!, (watch film, 2005)
8. Adam ol! 3, (film, 2007), (Lider TV)

== Videography ==
- Ilhamə Quliyeva – İlk Görüş
- Ilhamə Quliyeva – Sırğamın Qaşı – 1970, music: Khayyam Mirzazade
- Ilhamə Quliyeva – Başlanır ayrılıq – music: Khayyam Mirzazade
- İlhamə Quliyeva – Göygöl – 1972, music: Fikrat Amirov, lyrics: Teymur Elçin
- İlhamə Quliyeva – Mən səni araram – music: Fikrat Amirov, lyrics: Tələt Əyyubov
- İlhamə Quliyeva – Toy mahnısı – 1972, music: Fikrat Amirov, lyrics Teymur Elçin
- İlhamə Quliyeva – De görüm, neyləmişəm – 1972, music: Fikrat Amirov, lyrics: Teymur Elçin
- İlhamə Quliyeva – Gülür ellər – 1972, music: Fikrat Amirov, lyrics: Teymur Elçin
- İlhamə Quliyeva – Unuda Bilmirəm – music: Mobil Əhmədov
- İlhamə Quliyeva – Könül verdim – 1973, music: Ramiz Mirişli, lyrics: Fikrat Goja
- İlhamə Quliyeva – Bir xumar baxışla – 1974, music: Ramiz Mirişli, lyrics: İslam Səfərli
- İlhamə Quliyeva – Bu nə nazdır – music: Ramiz Mirişli, lyrics: Fikrat Goja
- İlhamə Quliyeva – Nəğməkar qız – music: Ramiz Mirişli, lyrics: İsgəndər Coşqun
- İlhamə Quliyeva – Yandım elə yandım – music: Ramiz Mirişli, lyrics Suleyman Rustam
- İlhamə Quliyeva – İnanmaram – 1976, music: Oqtay Kazımi, lyrics: Ramiz Heydar
- İlhamə Quliyeva – Tarla Qızları – 1978, music: Oqtay Kazımi, lyrics: Həmid Abbasov
- İlhamə Quliyeva – Körpə balam dil açır – music: Oqtay Kazımi, lyrics: Feyruz Mammadov
- Ilhamə Quliyeva – Şirindir – music: Oqtay Rəcəbov, lyrics: A. Babayev
- Ilhamə Quliyeva – Nəğmələr – 1980, music: Oqtay Rəcəbov, lyrics Bakhtiyar Vahabzadeh
- Ilhamə Quliyeva – Səhər, günorta, axşam – 1985, music: Oqtay Rəcəbov
- Ilhamə Quliyeva – Anam mehribanım Azərbaycanım – music: Oqtay Rəcəbov, lyrics: A. Babayev
- Ilhamə Quliyeva – Gülməz olum/Səni Unutsam – music: Oqtay Rəcəbov
- Ilhamə Quliyeva – Unuda bilməzsən – music: Elza İbrahimova, lyrics: Ruzigar Efendiyeva
- Ilhamə Quliyeva – Bilməzdim – music: Elza İbrahimova, lyrics: Oqtay Şamil
- İlhamə Quliyeva – Çiçək yağışı – 1971, music: Emin Sabitoglu, lyrics: Vaqif Səmədoğlu
- Ilhamə Quliyeva – Yaşadaq sevgini – music: Emin Sabitoglu, lyrics: Ramiz Heydar
- Ilhamə Quliyeva – Xoş gəlmisən Novruzum! – 1991, music: Emin Sabitoglu
- Ilhamə Quliyeva – Neylərsən – 1995, music: Faiq Sücəddinov, lyrics: Nuridə Atəşi
- Ilhamə Quliyeva – Kaman – 1995, music: Faiq Sücəddinov, lyrics: Xanım İsmayılqızı
- Ilhamə Quliyeva – Bilsən necə darıxmışam – 1996, music: Faiq Sücəddinov, lyrics: Nuridə Atəşi
- Ilhamə Quliyeva – Yaşın nə fərqi var ki? – 2000, music: Novruz Aslan, lyrics: Ilhama Guliyeva
- Ilhamə Quliyeva – Nə sevdik ki səninlə?
- Ilhamə Quliyeva – Bu şəhərdən çıxıb gedə bilərsən/Unuda bilməzsən – 2001, music: Novruz Aslan, lyrics: Xanım İsmayılqızı
- Ilhamə Quliyeva – Ay Qaragilə – music: Novruz Aslan, lyrics: Sona Valiyeva

== Honors ==
1. People's Artist of the Republic of Azerbaijan (25 May 1998)
2. Shohrat Order (19 August 2002)
3. Sharaf Order (17 August 2013)

== See also ==
Gulyanag Mammadova
