= Kərimbəyli, Nakhchivan =

Kərimbəyli, Nakhchivan may refer to:

- Kərimbəyli, Babek, Azerbaijan
- Kərimbəyli, Sharur, Azerbaijan
