= Oktay =

Oktay is a Turkish masculine given name. It is also used as a surname. Notable people with the name are as follows:

== First name ==
- Oktay Afandiyev (1926–2013), Azerbaijani historian
- Oktay Delibalta (born 1985), Turkish football player
- Oktay Derelioğlu (born 1975), Turkish football player
- Oktay Ekşi (born 1932), Turkish journalist, author and politician
- Oktay Güngör (born 1998), Turkish wrestler
- Oktay Hamdiev (born 2000), Bulgarian football player
- Oktay Kayalp (born 1957), Cypriot politician
- Oktay Kaynarca (born 1965), Turkish actor
- Oktay Kuday (born 1979), German-Turkish professional football player
- Oktay Mahmuti (born 1968), Turkish basketball coach
- Oktay Özdemir (born 1986), Turkish-German actor
- Oktay Rıfat Horozcu (1914–1988), Turkish writer and playwright
- Oktay Sinanoğlu (1935–2015), Turkish scientist
- Oktay Takalak (born 1990), French boxer
- Oktay Urkal (born 1970), Turkish-German professional welterweight
- Oktay Vural (born 1956), Turkish lawyer and politician
- Oktay Yıldırım (born 1971), Turkish military personnel
- Oktay Yusein (born 2000), Bulgarian football player

== Middle name ==
- Agah Oktay Güner (born 1937), Turkish journalist and politician
- André Oktay Dahl (born 1975), Norwegian politician
- Esat Oktay Yıldıran (1949–1988), Turkish military officer
- İhsan Oktay Anar (born 1960), Turkish writer and academic

== Surname ==
- Berk Oktay (born 1982), Turkish model and actor
- Fuat Oktay (born 1964), Turkish politician, civil servant and academic
- Metin Oktay (1936–1991), Turkish football player
- Muhayer Oktay (born 1999), German-born Turkish football player
- Süleyman Oktay (born 1959), Turkish football player and manager

== See also ==
- Ogtay
