= Azerpasha Nematov =

Azerpasha Nematov was an Azerbaijani theatre director.

== Career ==
In 1970, he graduated from the Theater Director Department of the Azerbaijan State University of Culture and Arts. In 1972, he worked as assistant director, production director, chief director, and artistic director at the Azerbaijan State Young Spectators Theater for various years. From 1974 to 1976, Azarpasha worked at the Leningrad Young People's Theatre in Russia.

Azarpasha participated in theater-related festivals and conferences in different countries such as Georgia, Greece, Russia and Turkey.

== Personal life ==
Azarpasha Nematov is the son of theater director, Zafar Nematov.

He died on 9 April 2023. His obituary was signed by president Ilham Aliyev, who had attended his funeral alongside first lady Mehriban Aliyeva.

== Awards and honors ==
Year	Award	Result	Ref.
1987	Honored Art Worker	Awarded	
1997	Humay Award	Awarded	
1998	Golden Dervish Award	Awarded	
2002	People's Artist of Azerbaijan	Awarded	
2003	Golden Dervish Award	Awarded	
2007	Shohrat Order	Awarded	
2017	Service to Motherland	2nd degree	
2018	Azerbaijan Democratic Republic 100th anniversary medal	Awarded	
2022	Sharaf Order	Awarded	
