= Nusnus Bath =

- Type: Architectural school of Nakhchivan
- Location: Nüsnüs,Ordubad District
- Area: Nakhchivan Autonomous Republic
- Built: XIV–XV century

Nusnus Bath (Azerbaijani: Nüsnüs hamamı) is a historical bathhouse and architectural monument located in the village of Nusnus, Ordubad District, Azerbaijan.

By the decision of the Cabinet of Ministers of the Republic of Azerbaijan No. 132 dated 2 August 2001, the bathhouse was included in the list of immovable historical and cultural monuments of local significance. By the decision of the Cabinet of Ministers of the Nakhchivan Autonomous Republic No. 98 dated 21 November 2007, it was also entered into the list of architectural monuments of national significance.

== Description ==
Nusnus Bathhouse was built in the 14th–15th centuries in the village of Nusnus, Ordubad District. It belongs to the group of underground bathhouses. Most of the structure lies beneath the ground, with only its domes and entrance door visible above the surface. The walls are 1.2 meters thick.

The bathhouse has a rectangular layout consisting of a bathing hall and adjoining auxiliary rooms. It is 22.6 meters long, 9.4 meters wide, and 5.6 meters high. Covering a total area of 213 m^{2}, the dressing and bathing halls, along with adjoining auxiliary rooms, are roofed with two spherical domes. The dressing and bathing halls are connected to each other through small vestibules.

The hot water pool of the bathhouse was built adjacent to the bathing hall. Pipes were installed beneath the bathing room and adjoining chambers to allow the circulation of hot air. There is a connection between the flues and the chimney passages. The bathhouse has three chimneys: one above the furnace in the southern part of the bathing hall, and two others in the northern part, located in the western and eastern walls. The furnace is situated beneath the water reservoir and has an arched entrance.Hot air channels run under the bathing room and adjoining chambers, connecting the furnace to the chimneys. The ceilings of the halls are covered with circular domes, while the chambers and deep niches are roofed with arches. A distinctive feature of the bathhouse compared to other medieval bathhouses is that its walls, domes, and arches were built using mountain stone. The interior is illuminated through an opening placed at the center of the domes and ceilings. In earlier times, the bathhouse was heated with straw and firewood. After straw was placed in the furnace, its chimney and mouth were sealed, and the resulting heat both warmed the water in the reservoir and passed through pipes laid under the floor, heating the bathing hall.The bathhouse remained in use until the 1940s–1950s.

Following the restoration of Azerbaijan's independence, by decision No. 132 of the Cabinet of Ministers of the Republic of Azerbaijan, dated 2 August 2001, the bathhouse was included in the list of immovable monuments of local importance. By decision No. 98 of the Cabinet of Ministers of the Nakhchivan Autonomous Republic, dated 21 November 2007, it was further included in the list of architectural monuments of national importance.

Due to long-term disuse, the bathhouse is currently in an emergency condition.

== Sources ==
=== Bibliography ===
- The encyclopaedia of “Nakhchivan monuments” (in Azerbaijani). Naxçıvan: national Academy of sciences of Azerbaijan nakhchivan branch. 2008. p. 521.
- Naxçıvan tarixi (in Azerbaijani). Vol. I. Naxçıvan: Əcəmi NPM. 2013. p. 452.
- Qənbərova, Gülnarə; Güneri, Alaettin (2018). Naxçıvanın mülki tikililərinin memarlığı (in Azerbaijani). Baku: Nurlan nəşriyyatı. p. 280.
