= Sabuhi =

Sabuhi is a given name. Notable people with the name include:

- Sabuhi Abdullazade (born 2001), Azerbaijani footballer
- Sabuhi Mammadov (born 1969), Azerbaijani politician
