= Samadov =

Samadov or Samedov (Azerbaijani: Səmədov, Russian: Самадов) is an Asian masculine surname, its feminine counterpart is Samadova or Samedova. Notable people with the surname include:

- Abdujalil Samadov (1949–2004), prime minister of Tajikistan
- Agadadash Samedov (1924–2016), Azerbaijani war veteran
- Aleksandr Samedov (born 1984), Russian football official and a former player
- Alibay Samadov (born 1982), Russian-born Azerbaijani weightlifter
- Alihan Samedov (born 1964), Azerbaijani musician
- Bahruz Samadov (born 29 April 1995), Azerbaijani political scientist, researcher, peace activist and political prisoner
- David Samedov (born 1998), Russian football defender
- Elnur Samedov (born 1993), Russian professional boxer
- Fazila Samadova (1929–2020), Azerbaijani scientist
- Ibragim Samadov (born 1968), Soviet weightlifter
- Javid Samadov (born 1987), Azerbaijani opera singer
- Mijgona Samadova (born 1998), Tajik boxer
- Movsum Samadov (born 1966), Azerbaijani political figure
- Ogtay Samadov (born 1952), Azerbaijani scientist
- Parviz Samedov (1970–1992), Azerbaijani war veteran
- Read Samadov, Azerbaijani chess player
- Umid Samadov (born 2003), Azerbaijani football midfielder
- Vajiha Samadova (1924–1965), Azerbaijani painter
- Yelyzaveta Samadova (born 1995), Azerbaijani volleyball player
- Zabit Samedov (born 1984), Azerbaijani kickboxer and Muay Thai fighter
