= Ogtay =

Ogtay is a given name and may refer to:

- Ogtay Aghayev (1934–2006) Soviet, Azerbaijani variety singer
- Ogtay Asadov (born 1955) Azerbaijani politician
- Ogtay Gulaliyev (born 1970) Azerbaijani human rights activist
- Ogtay Sadigzade (1921–2014) Soviet and Azerbaijani visual artist
- Ogtay Samadov (born 1952) Azerbaijani nuclear physicist
- Ogtay Shiraliyev (1950–2025) Azerbaijani politician

== See also ==
- Oktay
