= Mirnaib Hasanoglu =

- Mirnaib Həsənoğlu
- Born: February 2, 1962 (age 64); Azerbaijan SSR Ganja
- Citizenship: Azerbaijan
- Education: Azerbaijan State University of Culture and Arts
- Years active: 1982–present
- Known for: Photography

Mirnaib Hasanoglu (1962, Ganja, Azerbaijan) — a professional photographer, author of numerous books on photography, and one of the founders of the Union of Photographers of Azerbaijan.

== Life ==
Mirnaib Hasanoglu was born in the city of Ganja in 1962. He has been engaged in professional photography since 1982. In 1984, he enrolled at the Azerbaijan State Institute of Arts (now a university) and graduated in 1989.

== Activities ==
From 1990 onwards, his work began to be featured in the press. In 1995, he participated in a photo exhibition in the French city of Nantes. He was one of the authors of the books "Portraits of the Transition Period: The Azerbaijani Style" and "Azerbaijan Refugees" (published by UNICEF in 1997), as well as the book "Azerbaijan" (1998).

Between 1997 and 2002, he participated in the "World Press Photo" contests, and in 1998, he received a grant from the New York office of the Open Society Institute for his project titled "Butterflies of Need".

He was one of the founders of the Union of Azerbaijani Photographers in November 1998 and served as its chairman from 2011 to 2022. During this period, he has received international awards as the author of numerous photo albums and has held photo exhibitions.

The theme of Karabakh has always held a special place in the photographic work of Mirnaib Hasanoghlu. Specifically, he has compiled and maintained an extensive photographic archive related to both the first and second Karabakh wars. In December 2011, he held a solo photo exhibition titled "Haut Garabagh" at the Senate in France.

On April 29, 2021, a photo exhibition titled "Armenia's State Terrorism Through the Lenses of Azerbaijani Photographers" opened at the National Museum of History of Azerbaijan. The exhibition was organized as part of a larger display dedicated to Azerbaijan’s 44-day Patriotic War, titled "Karabakh – The Eternal Source of Dreams." More than 50 photographs by several photographers, including Mirnaib Hasanoglu, were showcased. Mirnaib Hasanoglu also assisted the museum in collecting these photographs.

== Awards ==
- 1st place for ABB at the "What is Khnolith" competition in Switzerland. September 2000.
- First place in the UN’s AIDS-prevention contest in Azerbaijan. November 2000.
- Union of Azerbaijani Photographers — Photographer of the Year. 2000.
- First place in a photo contest held by Pricewaterhouse.2001, may.
- Second place in the ecology photo contest.2001.
- Union of Azerbaijani Photographers — Golden Argus Award. 2002.
- 1st place in a photo contest held by the Ministry of Culture (Azerbaijan) 2006.
- Open Society Foundations grant for the project "Our Rainbow Colored Life: Drag Performer in Azerbaijan. Lady Slim" 2011.
