= Kanal 35 =

- Final logo of Kanal 35
- Type: Regional television
- Country: Azerbaijan
- Broadcast area: Nakhchivan Autonomous Republic
- Headquarters: Nakhchivan, Azerbaijan

Programming
- Language(s): Azerbaijani

Ownership
- Parent: Ministry of Education, Nakhchivan Autonomous Republic

History
- Launched: 14 July 2004; 20 years ago
- Closed: 15 May 2023; 22 months ago

Kanal 35 (otuz beş; lit. 'Channel 35') was an Azerbaijani public television station broadcast from and serving the Nakhchivan Autonomous Republic. It was launched on 14 July 2004 and operated under the umbrella of the Ministry of Communications and New Technologies of Nakhchivan. It was established as a tribute to former Azerbaijani president Heydar Aliyev. Kanal 35 later became a unit of the education ministry of the republic. It ceased operations on 15 May 2023.

== History ==
Kanal 35 began transmissions on 14 July 2004, coinciding with the 35th anniversary of Heydar Aliyev becoming the first secretary of the Communist Party of Azerbaijan, therefore succeeding as the ruler of Azerbaijan SSR at the time. It initially broadcast as a privately owned television channel, but later became a part of the Ministry of Education of Nakhchivan. Along with that, a new studio building was inaugurated for the channel. The station was provided with modern broadcasting equipment and a while after launch, it has garnered a huge audience within the autonomous republic.

On 1 January 2008, a television and radio editorial office was inaugurated from where Kanal 35 and its radio sister Voice of Nakhchivan are managed simultaneously. Kanal 35 received a warning on 18 January 2008 as the station was allocating an excessive amount of its time slots for programming about animals. Kanal 35 was granted a license by the Television and Radio Council of Nakhchivan Autonomous Republic in July 2008 after the council's establishment in 2007. The station used its right to obtain a license without participating in the competition and appealed for such.

Kanal 35 migrated completely to digital terrestrial television after the termination of analog television in the republic in February 2015. In 2019, four employees of Kanal 35 were awarded for their work in the television field in Nakhchivan. Kanal 35 started airing educational programming on 1 January 2021, and has become a mainly educational television channel since then. On 15 May 2023, Kanal 35 was transferred to and merged with the Nakhchivan Autonomous Republic Television and Radio Broadcasting closed joint stock company.

== Programming ==
In its launch, Kanal 35 broadcast programming relating to science and journalism. As of January 2008, the channel had broadcast some of its programmes in Turkish, which was later removed. It initially broadcast for 10 hours, but its broadcast timing was increased to 14 hours later on. In 2008, the channel began dubbing foreign content into local Azerbaijani. During that time, science-related programmes, fiction programmes, documentaries, and television films were broadcast on the channel. In later years, the programming structure of Kanal 35 became more aligned to being educational.
