= Bakhshiyev =

Bakhshiyev (Bakhshiyeva), or Bakhshiev (Bakhshieva) (Azerbaijani: Baxşıyev, Russian: Бахши́ев, Hebrew: בחשייב) is a surname. Notable people with the surname include:

- Alovsat Bakhshiyev (born 1956), an Azerbaijani politician
- Elmar Bakhshiyev (born 1980), an Azerbaijani footballer
- Mishi Bakhshiev (1910–1972), a Mountain Jewish Soviet writer and poet
- Roman Bakhshiyev (born 1979), a military person of the Armed Forces of Ukraine

== See also ==
- Bakhshi
- Bakshi
