= Shamsaddin Khanbabayev =

Azerbaijani politician (1939–2025)

- Şəmsəddin Xanbabayev

Prime Minister of the Nakhchivan Autonomous Republic
- In office 1993–2000
- Preceded by: Bejan Farzaliyev
- Succeeded by: Alovsat Bakhshiyev

Personal details
- Born: Shamsaddin Huseyngulu oglu Khanbabayev; 1 April 1939 Aşağı Əndəmic, Nakhichevan ASSR, Azerbaijan SSR, USSR
- Died: 13 January 2025 (aged 85) Khachmaz, Azerbaijan
- Party: YAP
- Education: Azerbaijan Polytechnic Institute
- Occupation: Engineer

Shamsaddin Huseyngulu oglu Khanbabayev (Azerbaijani: Şəmsəddin Hüseynqulu oğlu Xanbabayev; 1 April 1939 – 13 January 2025) was an Azerbaijani politician. A member of the New Azerbaijan Party, he served as Prime Minister of the Nakhchivan Autonomous Republic from 1993 to 2000.

Khanbabayev died in Khachmaz on 13 January 2025, at the age of 85.
