= House-museum of Sabit Rahman =

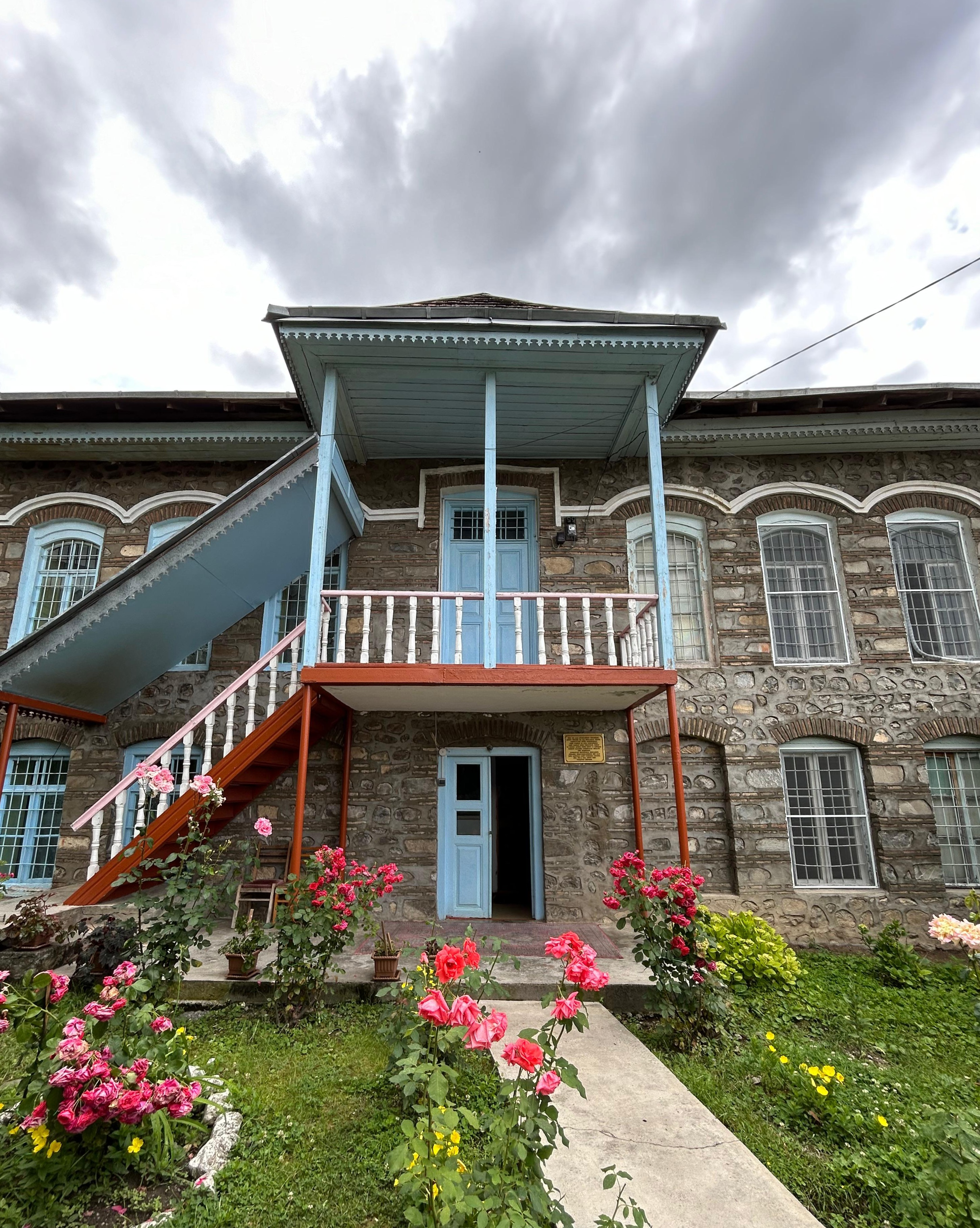
- Location: 21 Aghvanlar Neighborhood, Shaki City
- Coordinates: 41°12′06″N 47°11′21″E
- Collections: 460

The House-museum of Sabit Rahman is a historical and architectural monument and house museum dating back to 1910, located in the city of Shaki, Azerbaijan.

This house is the birthplace of Sabit Rahman, Honored Art Worker of the Azerbaijan SSR, writer, and playwright, as well as Emin Sabitoghlu, People's Artiste of Azerbaijan and composer.

== About the Building ==
The building was constructed in 1910 by Sabit Rahman's father, Rahman Efendi. Sabit Rahman was also born in this house. At that time, houses in Shaki were mostly built of brick, but Rahman Efendi built his house from stone. For this reason, the local people gave Rahman Efendi’s family the nickname “Dashagirenler” (“Stone Builders”). The two-story building was constructed in the national architectural style. It contains two old fireplaces and one large wall stove. The fireplace located on the second floor is decorated with geometric patterns.

== About the museum ==
According to Decision No. 163 of the Cabinet of Azerbaijan dated September 7, 2000, the proposal of the Ministry of Culture of the Republic of Azerbaijan, agreed upon with the Executive Authority of Shaki city, to establish the Sabit Rahman House-Museum in Shaki was approved. After that, restoration of the building began in 2000. On June 8, 2001, the Sabit Rahman House-Museum was opened for public use. In the large exhibition hall, Sabit Rahman’s personal belongings, his writing desk, and the piano he played during his childhood and youth are on display. Uzeyir Hajibeyli once listened to Sabit play this piano, greatly enjoyed it, and advised him to continue. In the lecture hall, exhibits related to Sabit Rahman’s son, composer Emin Sabitoghlu — author of over 600 songs — are presented. In the third room, the family’s household items are displayed, while in the fourth room, gifts presented during the playwright’s 50th jubilee are exhibited. In total, the house-museum holds nearly 460 exhibits.

== Pictures ==
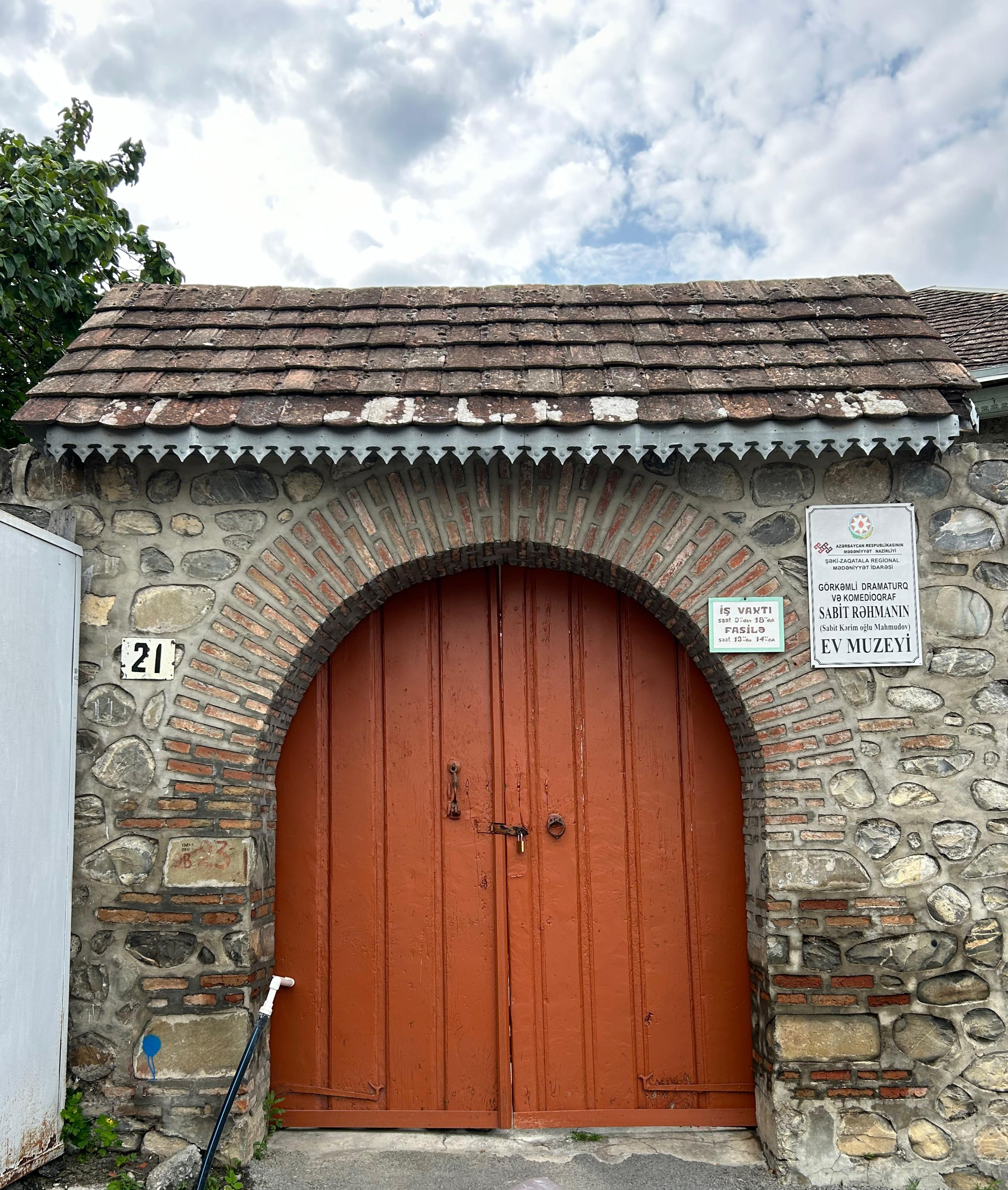

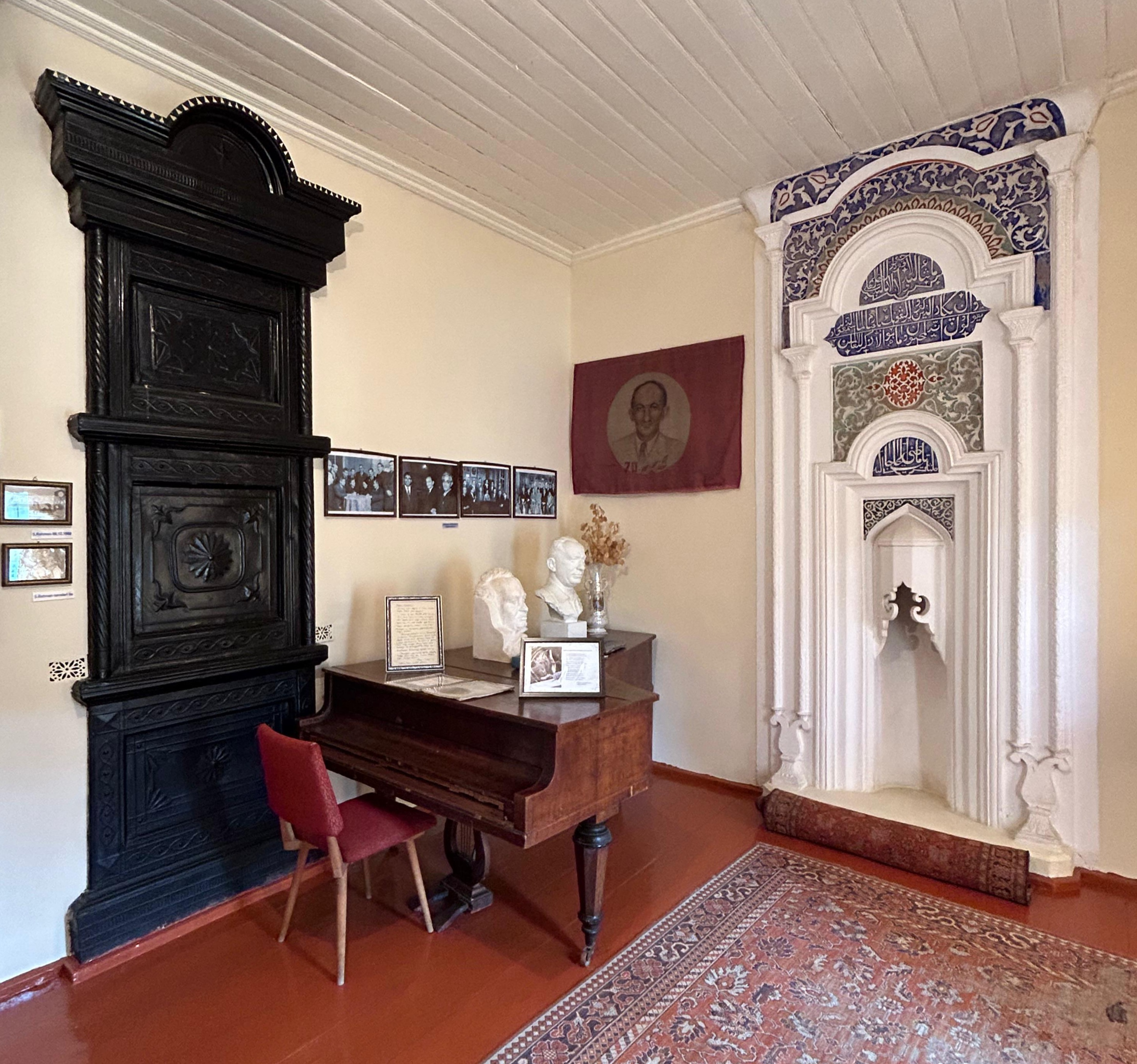

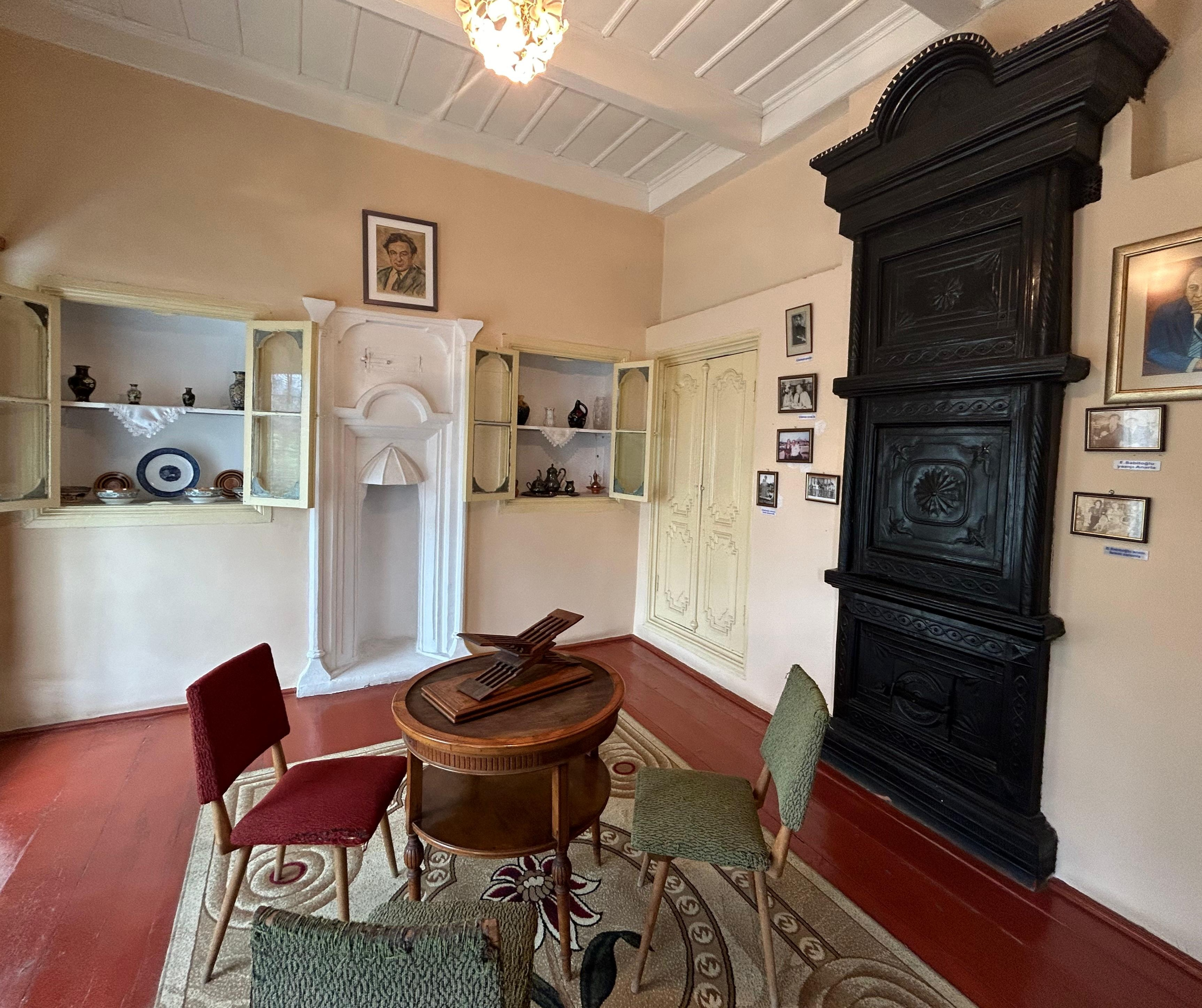

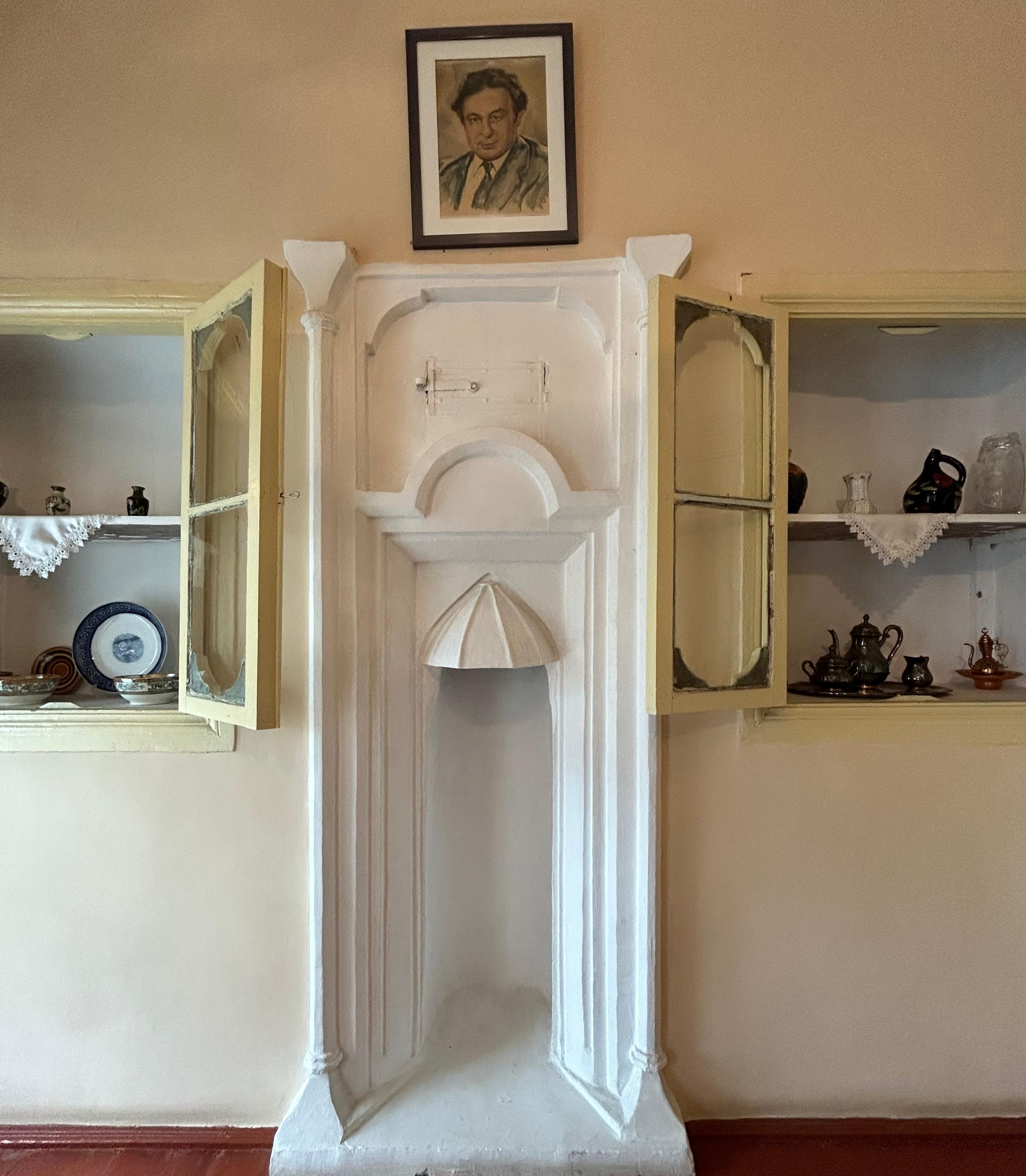

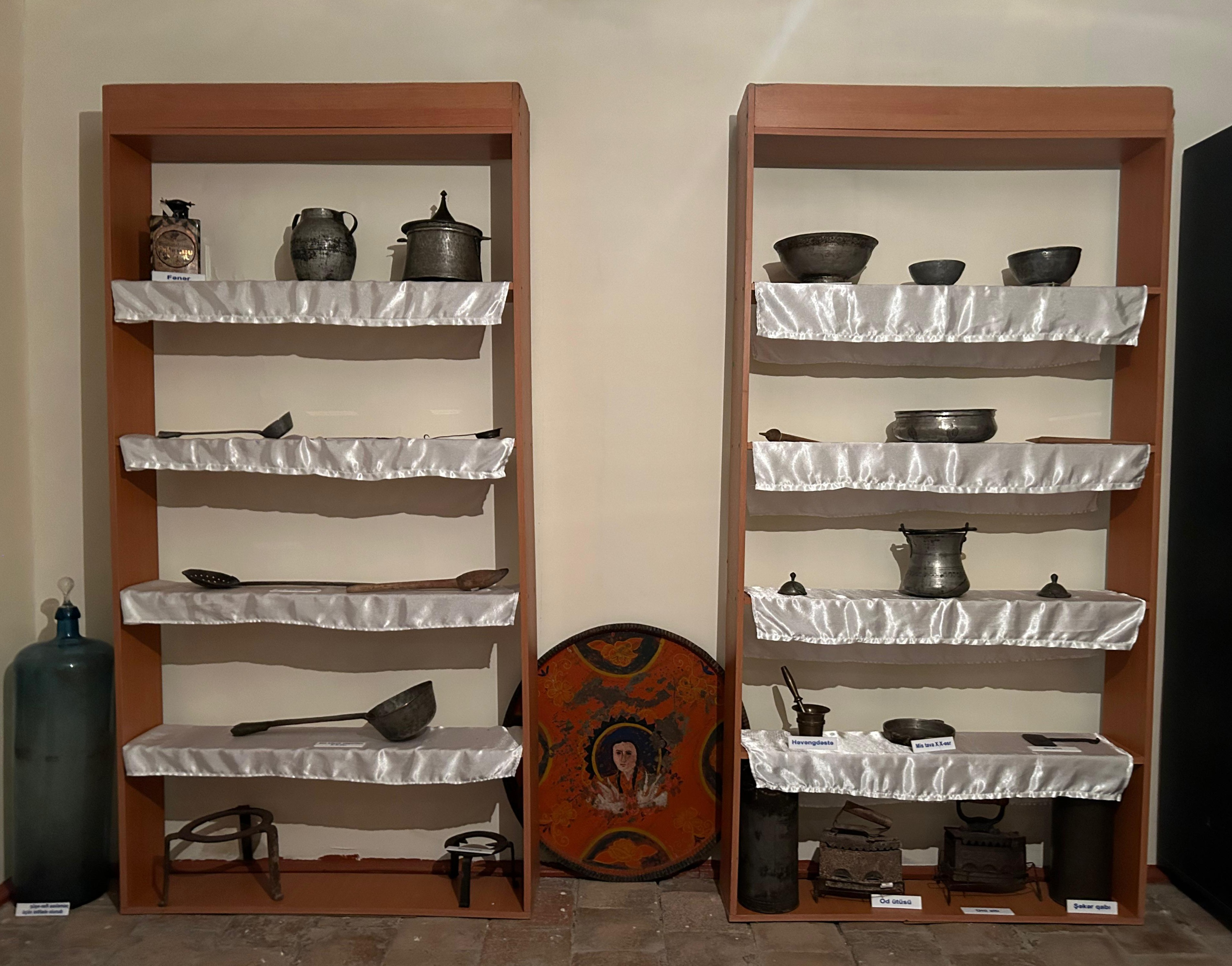

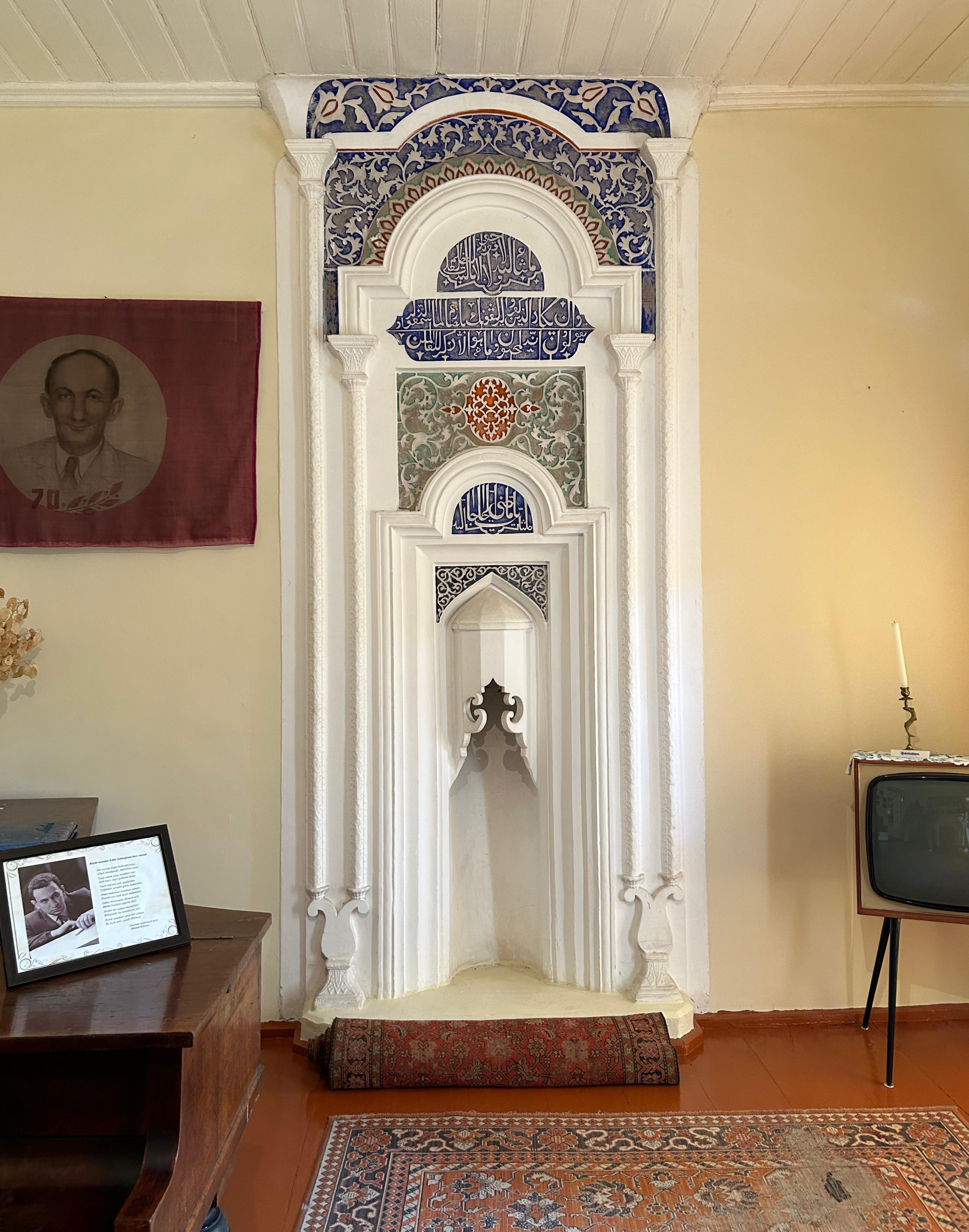

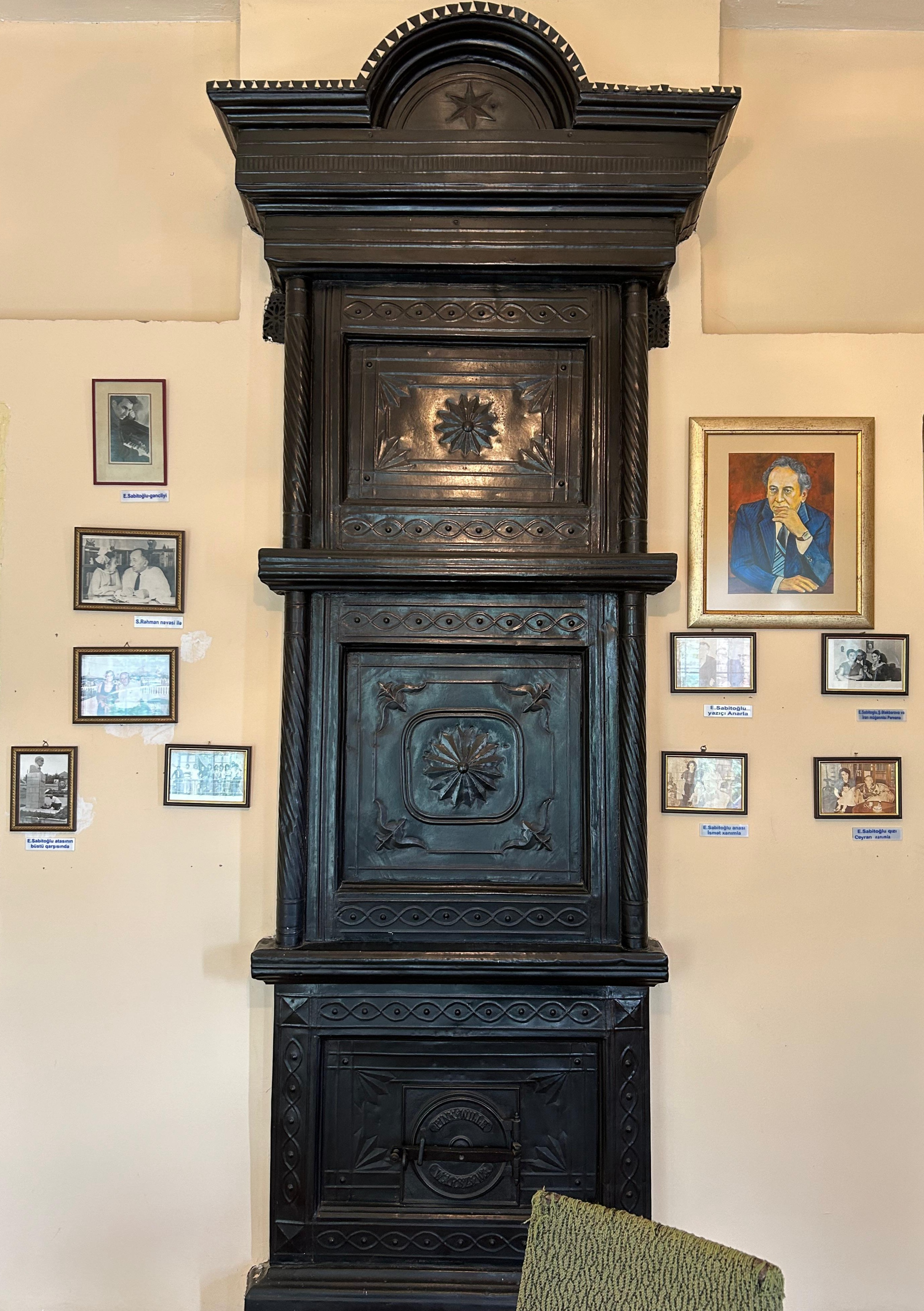

== See also ==
- Emin Sabitoglu
