= Alovsat Bakhshiyev =

Azerbaijani politician (born 1956)

- Əlövset Baxşıyev

3rd Prime Minister of the Nakhchivan Autonomous Republic
- In office 11 February 2000 – 14 May 2020
- Preceded by: Shamsaddin Khanbabayev
- Succeeded by: Sabuhi Mammadov

Personal details
- Born: 22 June 1956 (age 70) Karimbayli, Nakhichevan ASSR, Azerbaijan SSR, Soviet Union (now Nakhchivan Autonomous Republic, Azerbaijan)
- Education: D. Bunyadzade Azerbaijan National Economic Institute

Military service
- Allegiance: Soviet Union
- Branch/service: Soviet Army
- Years of service: 1977–1979

Alovsat Gazanfar Bakhshiyev (Azerbaijani: Əlövset Qəzənfər oğlu Baxşıyev; born 22 June 1956) is an Azerbaijani politician and economist who was the Prime Minister of the Nakhchivan Autonomous Republic from 2000 to 2020.

== Biography ==
Alovsat Gazanfar Bakhshiyev was born on 22 June 1956 in the village of Karimbayli, in the Nakhichevan Autonomous Soviet Socialist Republic. In 1963 he went to secondary school and graduated from high school in 1973. That same year, he entered the Finance and Credit Faculty of the D. Bunyadzade Azerbaijan National Economic Institute (now the Azerbaijan State University of Economics) and in 1977 graduated as an economist.

Bakhshiyev started his career in 1977 as an assistant accountant in the Ilic County Utilities Department. He was in military service in the Soviet Army from 1977 to 1979. From 1979 to 1986, he worked in the wine-growing sovkhoz "50th Anniversary of the Nakhichevan ASSR" as a legal adviser, economist, deputy chief accountant, chief accountant. He worked in the Ilich Regional Agro-Industrial Unity as leading economist-financier since 1986, and then until January 1992 served as Vice Chairman of the Council of People's Deputies of Ilich District. In 1992–1994 he was first deputy chairman and later chairman of the Executive Committee of the Assembly of People's Deputies of Sharur District.

Since August 1994 until February 2000, Bakhshiyev served as the Minister of Finance of the Nakhchivan Autonomous Republic.

Since 11 February 2000 Bakhshiyev has been serving as the Prime Minister of the Nakhchivan Autonomous Republic.

From 1990 to 1995 and from 1995 to 2000, he was elected as a deputy of the Supreme Assembly of Nakhchivan.

In 2006 he was awarded the honorary title of Civil Servant of the Autonomous Republic of Nakhchivan. In 2013 Bakhshiyev was awarded by the President of the Republic of Azerbaijan, Ilham Aliyev, with a 3rd degree "For Service to Fatherland" Order and in 2016 with the Order of Glory.

He is married and has 3 children.
