= Sona Valiyeva =

Azerbaijani poet and journalist

- Born: Sona Mahammad gizi Valiyeva; May 29, 1962 (age 64); Sharur District, Nakhchivan ASSR, Azerbaijan SSR
- Education: Azerbaijan State University of Culture and Arts
- Occupations: Poet, journalist, philologist
- Spouse: Ali M. Hasanov
- Writing career
- Notable awards: Honored Journalist of Azerbaijan (2005); Progress Medal (2005)

Sona Mahammad gizi Valiyeva (Sona Məhəmməd qızı Vəliyeva; born 29 May 1962) is an Azerbaijani poet, philologist, and journalist. She holds a Doctor of Sciences degree in Philology. Valiyeva is the founder of the Kaspi newspaper and heads the Kaspi Education Company. She served as the deputy chair of the National Television and Radio Council from 2011 to 2018.

== Life and career ==
Sona Valiyeva was born on 29 May 1962 in the Sharur District of the Nakhchivan Autonomous Republic. In 1984, she graduated from the Azerbaijan State University of Culture and Arts. Her early career included working as a teacher at the Uzeyir Hajibeyov Nakhchivan Music College (1984–1994) and as a correspondent for the Səs newspaper (1995–1999).

In 1999, Valiyeva re-established the Kaspi newspaper, a historic publication originally founded in 1881. Under her leadership, the newspaper resumed publication in both Azerbaijani and Russian languages. She also founded the Kaspi Education Company.

In 2007, she was appointed a member of the National Television and Radio Council by presidential decree. She served as the Deputy Chair of the Council from 2011 until her resignation in 2018. Between 2016 and 2019, she also lectured at the Department of Azerbaijani Literature at the Azerbaijan University of Languages.

Valiyeva is a member of the Azerbaijan Writers' Union. She is married to politician and scholar Ali M. Hasanov; the couple has two children.

== Literary activity ==
Valiyeva is a poet of the post-independence period of Azerbaijani literature. Her first poetry collection, My Pink-Coloured World (Çəhrayı rəngli dünyam), was published in 2007. This was followed by several other collections, including Arazbarı (2011), The World Has the Dimension of God (2017), and A Prayer Soaked in Rain (2020).

Her literary works have been translated into various languages and published internationally. Collections of her poetry have appeared in Turkey, Russia, Iran, Germany, Poland, Serbia, Kyrgyzstan, and other countries. Her poems have been featured in literary periodicals in English, Russian, Persian, Uzbek, and other languages.

In 2016, she authored the historical novel The Road Leading to Light (İşığa gedən yol). The novel is dedicated to the life and legacy of Hasan bey Zardabi, the founder of the Azerbaijani press. The work received the "Golden Word" (Qızıl Kəlmə) award from the Ministry of Culture of Azerbaijan in 2017.

She also founded the "Kaspi Publications" book series and has served as its editor.

== Scientific and public activity ==
Valiyeva earned her PhD in Philology in 2005 and her Doctor of Sciences degree in 2018. Her research focuses on the ideology of Azerbaijanism, media history, and the poetics of Huseyn Javid.

She has been actively involved in the study and promotion of Huseyn Javid's legacy. Valiyeva initiated the publication of Javid's works in Turkey and Iran. She organized international conferences dedicated to the poet in Uzbekistan (Urgench State University), Kazakhstan (Al-Farabi Kazakh National University), and Turkey. She also led the project "Huseyn Javid: Return to the Homeland", which documented the repatriation of the poet's remains from Siberia to Azerbaijan through a photo album and collection of articles.

== Selected publications ==
=== Poetry ===
- Çəhrayı rəngli dünyam (2007)
- Arazbarı (2011)
- Dünya Tanrı biçimdədir (2017)
- Yağışda islanan dua (2020)

=== Prose ===
- İşığa gedən yol (2016)
- Qapı sirri (2024)

=== Non-fiction ===
- Azərbaycançılıq ədəbi-estetik təlim kimi (2002)
- Hüseyn Cavidin poetikası (2018)

== Awards ==
- Progress Medal (2005) — for services in the development of journalism.
- Honoured Journalist of Azerbaijan (2012).
- Supreme Media Award of the Press Council (2016).
- "Golden Word" Award (2017) — for the novel The Road Leading to Light.
- TÜRKSOY "Molla Panah Vaqif" Medal (2017).
- Honorary Professor of Urgench State University (Uzbekistan, 2018).
- "Golden Pen" Award of the National Writers’ Union of Kyrgyzstan (2019).
