= Nüsnüs =

- Municipality
- Location within Azerbaijan
- Coordinates: 38°57′11″N 46°01′46″E
- Country: Azerbaijan
- Autonomous republic: Nakhchivan
- District: Ordubad

Population (2005)
  - Total: 1,905
- Time zone: UTC+4 (AZT)

Nüsnüs (also, Nusnus and Nyusnyus) is a village and municipality in the Ordubad District of Nakhchivan, Azerbaijan. It is located 7 km in the north-east from the district center, on the foothill of the mountain. Its population is busy with gardening, vegetable-growing, farming and animal husbandry. There are secondary school, club, culture house, kindergarten, communications branch and a medical center in the village. It has a population of 1,905.

== Etymology ==
The name of the village was created from the name of the mineral springs in its territory. In 1933, the village was registered as Nusnus. It can be assumed that the original version of name is the Nusus. The component of Nus/nuş نوش in Persian means "nectar, tasty, forever", pleasant, drinkable, tasty drink ", and the component of us used in meaning "water". The name can be explained as "delicious water", "potable water", "magic water".

== Nusnus Mosque ==
Nusnus mosque - the historical monument of the architecture school Nakhchivan. It was built on the relatively high area in the Nusnus village of Ordubad region. The researchers show that, the Nusnus mosque with its structure plan and composition is compatible with the traditions of medieval construction. There is a Sanctuary on the first floor of the building of the mosque. By the initiative of the people of the village, the Nusnus mosque was renovated in 1993.

== Nusnus Sanctuary ==
Nusnus Sanctuary - Sanctuary of the medieval ages in the Nusnus village of Ordubad region. The historical and architectural monument is located on the first floor of the Nusnus mosque. There is a stone column in the center of the mosque about 5 meters in height. The entrance door of the sanctuary was made from solid walnut, which widespread in the Ordubad. The epitaph with smooth handwriting in Arabic, in nine lines was engraved on over the door. Russian diplomat and orientalist Xanıkov, has reported for the first time about epitaph. He has read the epitaph and translated it into French and has published in Paris. From epitaph it becomes clear that the mosque was built in the reign of the son of Olcaytu Mohammad Khodabandeh, the ruler of the Elkhani, Abu Said Bahadir Khan, in the years 1316–1335.

== Valley Sanctuary ==
Valley Sanctuary - Sanctuary in the north from the Nusnus village of Ordubad region. The building of the sanctuary is square and longish. The walls were built of stone. Inside the tomb has a Muslim grave. Black veil was drawn over the grave. The names of the four caliphs was written in the corners of the door of the sanctuary. Around the sanctuary there are spring, garden and the remains of a buildings of the medieval ages. During the study, near the sanctuary have been found the glazed and unglazed ceramic products of the medieval ages. There are various legends about the sanctuary, among the nation. According to the epigraphic evidence, it is sanctuary of the 12-14th centuries.

== See also ==
- Nusnus Bath
