= Jeyhun Jalilov =

Azerbaijani politician (born 1987)

- Ceyhun Cəlilov

Presidential Plenipotentiary Representative in Nakhchivan Autonomous Republic
- Incumbent
- Assumed office 12 November 2025
- Preceded by: Fuad Najafli

6th Prime Minister of the Nakhchivan Autonomous Republic
- In office 25 April 2024 – 12 November 2025
- Preceded by: Sabuhi Mammadov
- Succeeded by: Jabbar Musayev

Minister of Labor and Social Protection of the Population of the Nakhchivan Autonomous Republic
- In office 15 March 2023 – 25 April 2024
- Preceded by: Nijat Babayev
- Succeeded by: Farid Baghirzade (acting)

Personal details
- Born: 1987 (age 38–39) Shahbuz, Nakhchivan ASSR, Azerbaijan SSR, USSR
- Education: Azerbaijan State University of Economics, University of Essex

Jeyhun Ramiz oghlu Jalilov (Azerbaijani: Ceyhun Ramiz oğlu Cəlilov; born 1987) is an Azerbaijani economist and politician serving as the Plenipotentiary Representative of the President of the Republic of Azerbaijan in the Nakhchivan Autonomous Republic since 12 November 2025. He has previously served as Prime Minister of the Nakhchivan Autonomous Republic since 25 April 2024.

== Biography ==
Jeyhun Jalilov was born in 1987 in the city of Shahbuz, Nakhchivan Autonomous Republic. In 2009, he graduated with a bachelor's degree in International Economic Relations from the Azerbaijan State University of Economics and completed his master's degree in 2012. In 2013, he obtained a master's degree in finance from the University of Essex and continued his studies in Strategic Management at the Chartered Institute of Management Accountants.

From 2011 to 2013, Jalilov worked in the International Organizations Cooperation Department of the Ministry of Economic Development of Azerbaijan. From 2013 to 2021, he held various positions in the Finance Department of BP Caspian. In March 2021, he was appointed advisor to the chairman of the board of the Agency for Sustainable and Operational Social Security (DOST), and in August 2021, he became the deputy chairman of the board of the agency.

On 15 March 2023, Jeyhun Jalilov was appointed Minister of Labor and Social Protection of the Population of the Nakhchivan Autonomous Republic. On 25 April 2024, he was discharged from this position and was appointed the Prime Minister of the Nakhchivan Autonomous Republic.

On 12 November 2025, he was appointed Plenipotentiary Representative of the President of the Republic of Azerbaijan in the Nakhchivan Autonomous Republic upon a presidential decree.
