= Prime Minister of the Nakhchivan Autonomous Republic =

- Incumbent; Jabbar Musayev since 9 February 2026
- Inaugural holder: Mirismayil Aliyev
- Formation: 17 November 1990 (35 years ago)

The prime minister of the Nakhchivan Autonomous Republic is the head of government of Nakhchivan Autonomous Republic, an exclave of Azerbaijan. In accordance with Article 37 of the Constitution of the Nakhchivan Autonomous Republic:

Prime Minister of the Nakhchivan Autonomous Republic shall be appointed by the Supreme Majlis of Nakhchivan Autonomous Republic on the basis of representation of the President of the Republic of Azerbaijan.

The prime minister is a member of and chairs the Cabinet of Ministers of the Nakhchivan Autonomous Republic, which exercises executive power in the autonomy and represents the Nakhchivan Autonomous Republic in the Cabinet of Ministers of the Azerbaijan Republic in economic and cultural fields.

== Prime ministers of the Nakhchivan Autonomous Republic ==
#	Name	Photo	Term start	Term end	Party affiliation
1	Mirismayil Aliyev		November 17, 1990	September 1991	Azerbaijan Communist Party
2	Bejan Farzaliyev		September 1991	1993	Azerbaijani Popular Front Party
3	Shamsaddin Khanbabayev		1993	2000	New Azerbaijan Party
4	Alovsat Bakhshiyev		11 February 2000	14 May 2020	New Azerbaijan Party
5	Sabuhi Mammadov		23 May 2020	25 April 2024	New Azerbaijan Party
6	Jeyhun Jalilov		25 April 2024	12 November 2025	Independent
7	Jabbar Musayev		9 February 2026	Incumbent	Independent

== See also ==
- Prime Minister of Azerbaijan
