= Cabinet of Ministers of the Nakhchivan Autonomous Republic =

Advisory body in Azerbaijan

- Naxçıvan Muxtar Respublikası Nazirlər Kabineti

Agency overview
- Formed: 9 February 1991 (35 years ago)
- Headquarters: 42 Heydar Aliyev Avenue, Nakhchivan City, Nakhchivan Autonomous Republic, Azerbaijan
- Agency executive: Jeyhun Jalilov, Prime Minister of the Nakhchivan Autonomous Republic
- Website: https://nazirlerkabineti.nmr.az/

The Cabinet of Ministers of the Nakhchivan Autonomous Republic (Azerbaijani: Naxçıvan Muxtar Respublikası Nazirlər Kabineti) is the highest executive body of the Nakhchivan Autonomous Republic, operating under the Supreme Assembly of Nakhchivan.

== Powers ==
According to the Constitution of the Nakhchivan Autonomous Republic, the Cabinet of Ministers prepares the draft budget of the autonomous republic and submits it to the Supreme Assembly, ensures the implementation of economic and social programs and adopts decisions and orders on other issues.

== Cabinet members ==
Post	Minister
Top leadership
Prime Minister	Sabuhi Mammadov
First Deputy Prime Minister	Elshad Aliyev
Deputy Prime Minister	
Ministries
Minister of the Interior	Süleyman Neymatov
Ministry of Environment and Natural Resources	Mayis Aliyev
Ministry of Emergency Situations	Shamo Abdullayev
Ministry of Justice	Shahin Abbasov
Ministry of Labor and Social Protection	Nijat Babayev
Ministry of Youth and Sports	Ramil Haji
Ministry of Economy	Tapdıq Aliyev
Ministry of Agriculture	Bahruz Bayramov
Ministry of Finance	
Ministry of Culture	Natavan Gadimova
Ministry of Communications and New Technologies	Vusal Sevdimaliyev
Ministry of Public Health	Niyazi Novruzov
Ministry of Education	Rahman Mammadov
Committees
State Committee on Family, Women and Children's Problems	Ramila Seyidova
State Statistics Committee	Vagif Rasulov
State Urban Planning and Architecture Committee	Hijran Rustamov
Services
State Transport Service	Ali Huseynaliyev
State Energy Service	Namig Pashayev
State Migration Service	Sahin Nabiyev
State Insurance Service	Bakhtiyar Mammadov
Foreign Intelligence Service	Fariz Bagirov
State Service for Mobilization and Conscription	Mirza Jalilov
Agencies
State Agency for Work with Religious Institutions	Vugar Babayev
Media Development Agency	
Departments
State Department of Tourism	Akbar Novruzov
Department of the Ministry of Foreign Affairs	

== See also ==
- President of Azerbaijan
- Vice President of Azerbaijan
- Prime Minister of Azerbaijan
