= Sabuhi Mammadov =

Azerbaijani politician (born 1969)

- Səbuhi Məmmədov

5th Prime Minister of the Nakhchivan Autonomous Republic
- In office 23 May 2020 – 25 April 2024
- Leader: Vasif Talibov; Azer Zeynalov
- Preceded by: Alovsat Bakhshiyev
- Succeeded by: Jeyhun Jalilov

Personal details
- Born: 1 May 1969 (age 56) İbadulla, Ilich district, Nakhichevan ASSR, Azerbaijan SSR, USSR
- Citizenship: Azerbaijan
- Party: New Azerbaijan Party since 1995

Səbuhi Hidayət oğlu Məmmədov (born 1 May 1969) is an Azerbaijani banker and politician, who is currently serving as the 5th Prime Minister of the Nakhchivan Autonomous Republic.

== Early life ==
Sabuhi Mammadov was born on 1 May 1969 in Ibadulla village of Sharur region of Nakhchivan Autonomous Republic. After graduating from high school, he graduated from the Faculty of Economics of the Azerbaijan Agricultural Academy with a degree in "Accounting, Control and Analysis of Economic Activity."

== Career ==
He was appointed Minister of Finance of the Nakhchivan Autonomous Republic by the Order of the Chairman of the Supreme Assembly of the Nakhchivan Autonomous Republic Vasif Talibov on February 6, 2017 and as a Deputy Prime Minister-Minister of Finance on November 30, 2018. On May 23, 2020, Talibov appointed him as prime minister upon the recommendation of President Ilham Aliyev.

== Recognition ==
- Progress Prize.
- Honored Civil Servant.
- Azerbaijan Democratic Republic 100th anniversary medal (2019)

== Personal life ==
He is married and has 4 children.
