= Tukezban Ismayilova =

Azerbaijani singer

- Born: 21 December 1923; Baku, Azerbaijan SSR, Soviet Union
- Died: 24 March 2008 (aged 84); Baku, Azerbaijan
- Occupations: Singer, khananda
- Spouses: Mazahir Guliyev (m. 1942; div. 1948): Habib Bayramov
- Children: Ilhama Guliyeva
- Awards: People's Artist of the Republic of Azerbaijan, Order of Glory

Tukezban Maharram gyzy Ismayilova (Azerbaijani: Tükəzban Məhərrəm qızı İsmayılova; 21 December 1923 – 24 March 2008) was an Azerbaijani singer and khananda, People's Artist of the Republic of Azerbaijan, personal scholar of the President of the Republic of Azerbaijan.

== Life and career ==
Tukezban Ismayilova was born on 21 December 1923 in Baku. In 1939–1944, she studied at the Asaf Zeynalli Music College and began performing as a professional singer. From 1939 to 1946, Ismayilova was a soloist of the Azerbaijan State Philharmonic.

In 1942, she married Mazahir Guliyev, who worked as a prosecutor, with whom she had a daughter, Ilhama. The couple divorced when their daughter was 5 years old. Ismaylova later married tar player Habib Bayramov.

During World War II, Ismayilova gave concerts on the front as part of the propaganda brigade. In 1944, she started her career as a singer at the Radio Committee of Azerbaijan.

In 1946–1949, Ismayilova was a soloist of the choir of the Azerbaijan Radio Broadcasting Committee.

From 1948 to 1956, she was again a soloist of the Azerbaijan State Philharmonic. After the transformation of the concert department of the Philharmonic Society into the organization "Azerbaijan State Stage" in 1956, Ismayilova worked there until 1962.

From 1962 to 1978, she was a soloist of the Azerbaijan State Philharmonic Society. In 1978–1993, Ismayilova was a soloist of the Azkonsert Tour-Concert Union.

From 1985, Ismayilova started teaching at the State Gymnasium of Art.

In 1993, Ismayilova was awarded the title of the People's Artist of the Republic of Azerbaijan.

Ismayilova's repertoire consisted of works by Azerbaijani composers, folk songs and mughams. Most of Tukezban Ismayilova's recordings are currently kept in the Gold Fund. During her career, Ismayilova toured in foreign countries, representing Azerbaijan in Germany, Poland, Iraq, Iran, Turkey, Egypt, Algeria, etc.

After the death of her second husband, Habib Bayramov, in 1994, Ismayilova left the stage and dedicated herself to teaching, working as a teacher at the Art Gymnasium from 1994 to 2004.

In 1998, she was awarded the "Order of Glory" of the Republic of Azerbaijan.

Tukezban Ismayilova died on 24 March 2008 in Baku at the age of 85.

In 2019, a concert dedicated to Ismayilova was organized at the International Mugham Center as part of the "Creators and Survivors" project. A bas-relief of Ismayilova and her husband, Habib Bayramov, is to be erected in front of their house.

== Filmography ==
- O, olmasın, bu olsun (1956)
- Havalansın Xanın Səsi (2001)
- Oxuyan Ürəkdir (2003)

== Awards ==
- People's Artist of Azerbaijan (1993)
- Shohrat Order (1998)
- Honorary scholarship of the President of Azerbaijan
