= Akif Jafar Hajiyev =

Azerbaijani mathematician

Akif Hajiyev
- Born: 8 December 1937; Baku,Azerbaijan
- Died: 3 February 2015; Baku, Azerbaijan
- Education: Doctor of Physical and Mathematical Sciences
- Occupations: ANS (Azerbaijan National Academy of Sciences) Secretary of Department of Physics, Mathematics and Technical Sciences

Akif Jafar Hajiyev (Azerbaijani: Akif Cəfər oğlu Hacıyev, 8 December 1937 – 3 February 2015) was an Azerbaijani mathematician. He served as the vice-president of the Azerbaijan National Academy of Sciences from 2013 until his death. From 2004 to 2013, he was the director of the Institute of Mathematics and Mechanics of the National Academy of Sciences. He authored four books, in addition to numerous papers. By presidential decree, he was awarded the "Order of Glory" in 2004 and "Honored Worker of Science" in 2005. He became the president of the Azerbaijan Mathematical Society in 2010.

A native of Baku, Hajiyev was best known for his work in the theory of multidimensional singular integrals.
