= Zarosh Hamzayeva =

Azerbaijani actress

- Born: Zarosh (Zarrintaj) Mirzabagir gizi Hamzayeva; 22 March 1925
- Died: 7 June 2004 (aged 79)
- Occupation: actress
- Awards: Honored Artist of Azerbaijan (1956), People’s Artist of Azerbaijan (1967), Shohrat Order (2000)

Zarosh (Zarrintaj) Mirzabagir gizi Hamzayeva, née Aliyeva (Azerbaijani: Xumar Rza qızı Zülfüqarova; 22 March 1925, Negram village, Nakhchivan Autonomous Soviet Socialist Republic – 6 June 2004, Baku), was an Azerbaijani and Soviet actress, Honored Artist of Azerbaijan (1956), and People's Artist of Azerbaijan (1967).

== Life ==
Zarosh Aliyeva was born on 22 March 1925 in the village of Negram, Babek region of the Nakhchivan Autonomous Republic. Her father, Mirza Bagir Aliyev, was a well-known intellectual, and her mother, Afshan Makinskaya, was a well-educated woman. Mirza Bagir wrote the book "Our Bloody Days" about the atrocities committed by the Armenian Dashnaks in Nakhchivan in 1918–1920. Aliyeva received her secondary education in the village of Negram, and from the age of nine or ten, tended to recite poetry. In 1941 she first appeared on stage.

== Career ==
In 1938, Aliyeva married theater director and actor Ibrahim Hamzayev. In 1941, she first appeared on stage performing in the school drama club. In 1942, Hamzayeva began her stage activity at the Nakhchivan State Music and Drama Theater named after Jalil Mammadguluzadeh. In 1944, she was awarded the title of Honored Artist of the Nakhchivan Autonomous Republic.

In 1948, together with her husband, director Ibragim Hamzayev, Hamzayeva was sent to the State Drama Theater of Qaryagin (now the Fuzuli State Drama Theater), which was then on the verge of closure. Since 1950, the Hamzayevs resumed their work at the Nakhichevan Theater, working on new performances. In 1956, Hamzayeva was awarded the title of the Honored Artist of Azerbaijan. In 1960, theater critic Adila Ismayilova wrote a book about Hamzayeva.

In 1967, Hamzayeva was awarded the title of People's Artist of Azerbaijan. After the death of her husband, Hamzayeva did not appear on the stage again. She moved to Baku. In 2000, by decree of the President of Azerbaijan, Heydar Aliyev, Hamzayeva was awarded the Order of Glory.

Zarosh Hamzayeva died on 6 June 2004 in Baku.

In 2008, on the day of the fourth anniversary of the death of Gamzayeva, a memorial plaque was installed on the wall of the house where the actress lived at the initiative of the Ministry of Culture and Tourism of Azerbaijan.

== Filmography ==
- Summer Day Hazan Leaves (film, 1986)
- Nehremli Girl (film, 2002)
