= Kərimbəyli, Fuzuli =

Kərimbəyli
- Municipality
- Location within Azerbaijan Location within Karabakh Economic Region
- Coordinates: 39°30′30″N 47°25′06″E
- Country: Azerbaijan
- District: Fuzuli

Population
  - Total: 2,403
- Time zone: UTC+4 (AZT)

Kərimbəyli (also, Kerimbeyli) is a village and municipality in the Fuzuli District of Azerbaijan. It has a population of 2,403.
