= Kərimbəyli, Barda =

Kərimbəyli
- Municipality
- Location within Azerbaijan Location within Karabakh Economic Region
- Coordinates: 40°26′46″N 47°15′29″E
- Country: Azerbaijan
- Rayon: Barda

Population
  - Total: 259
- Time zone: UTC+4 (AZT)
  - Summer (DST): UTC+5 (AZT)

Kərimbəyli (also, Kerimbeyli) is a village and municipality in the Barda Rayon of Azerbaijan. It has a population of 259.
