= Azerbaijan Democratic Republic 100th anniversary medal =

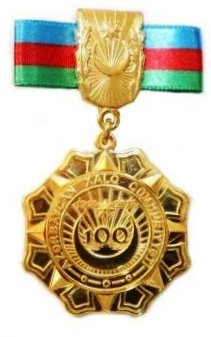
Azerbaijan Democratic Republic 100th anniversary medal

The Jubilee medal of "100th Anniversary of Azerbaijan Democratic Republic (1918-2018)” (Azerbaijani: Azərbaycan Xalq Cümhuriyyətinin 100 illiyi (1918-2018)” Azərbaycan Respublikasının yubiley medalı) is a state award of Azerbaijan dedicated to the 100th anniversary of ADR. The award was established on May 1, 2018 in accordance with the amendments to the “Law on Establishment of Orders and Medals of Azerbaijan”.

== Award description ==
The medal “100 years of Azerbaijan Democratic Republic (1918-2018)” is a 42 mm x 15 mm rectangle ribbon connected with eight-pointed star enameled on an octagon shaped plaque with a diameter of 40 mm. The plaque with the star on its obverse are made of bronze which covered by golden surface. There is a circular layer in the center of the star on which the crescent and octagonal star are depicted among the Sun rays. 1918 and 2018 are engraved on the left and right side of this star respectively. Along the upper arc of the circular layer, Azerbaijan Democratic Republic is written, while along the lower arc, 3 eight-pointed stars (the star in the middle has a diameter of 3 mm, the others of 2 mm) are described.

The reverse side of the medal has a flat surface, and the lower part is engraved with the series and number of the medal.

The octagon plaque is attached to the silk ribbon on which the colors of Azerbaijani flag are illustrated. In the center of the ribbon there is a hexagonal plaque (17 mm x 22.5 mm) on which the crescent and 8-pointed star are described. Oak wreaths are engraved on the left and right outlines of the plaque.

== Criteria for award ==
Successors of the leaders of the ADR, as well as the people who contributed to the study and promotion of the heritage of the Azerbaijan Democratic Republic, the preservation and development of the state independence of the Republic of Azerbaijan, and to the socio-political life of the country are awarded with this medal.

== The way of wearing ==
This medal is worn on the left side of the chest, if there is any other orders and medals of Azerbaijan, it is placed after them.

== Recipients ==
- Sajjad Karim
- Rais Rasulzade
- Leila Abasguliyeva
- Khurshud Abdullayeva
- Solmaz Shikhlinskaya
- Zaur Aliyev
- Azad Khan-Khoyski
- Hasanbala Sadigov
- Javid Baghirzade
- Azad Bayramov
- Rashad Nabiyev
- Azerpasha Nematov

== See also ==
- Orders, decorations, and medals of Azerbaijan
- National symbols of Azerbaijan
