= Aşağı Əndəmic =

- Municipality
- Location within Azerbaijan
- Coordinates: 38°55′N 46°01′E
- Country: Azerbaijan
- Autonomous republic: Nakhchivan
- District: Ordubad

Population (2005)
  - Total: 814
- Time zone: UTC+4 (AZT)

Aşağı Əndəmic (also, Ashaghy Andamich and Ashaga Andamish) is a village and municipality in the Ordubad District of Nakhchivan, Azerbaijan. It is located 5 km in the north-east from the district center, in the right bank of the Dubandi River. Its population is busy with gardening, vegetable-growing and animal husbandry. There are secondary school, club and a medical center in the village. It has a population of 814.

== Etymology ==
The village was founded by the families who moved out from the former Əndəmiç (Andamich) village at the beginning of the 19th century and has been called Aşağı (Lower) Əndəmic because of its location in the down side.
