= Agency for Sustainable and Operative Social Provision =

Azerbaijan governmental agency

Agency for Sustainable and Operative Social Provision (Azerbaijani: Dayanıqlı və Operativ Sosial Təminat Agentliyi (DOST)) is a governmental agency which was created by the order of President in order to improve governance in employment, social protection, labor. It is guided by the Constitution of the Republic of Azerbaijan, international treaties to which the Republic is a party, laws of the Republic, decrees and orders of the President, decisions and resolutions of the Cabinet of Azerbaijan, other normative legal acts and agency's Charter. It collects all the services of Ministry of Labor and Social Protection of Population of Azerbaijan at one place using Single Window System.

== History ==
The agency was created according to order #229 of President Ilham Aliyev. The order was signed on 9 August 2018. The first agency center is opened in Yasamal, Baku. President attended the opening ceremony. The opening ceremony was held on May 9, 2019. "DOST" centers are established to provide employment services, labor, social protection and guarantees, as well as other services in accordance with the activities of the Ministry of Labor and Social Protection of Population of Azerbaijan.

The initial funding of the agency was 10 million manat.

DOST center 2

The second agency center is opened in the Khazar administrative region of Baku with the attendance of the President Ilham Aliyev December 24, 2019. On May 19, the 3rd DOST center was inaugurated in Nizami raion of Baku.

== Rights and duties ==
The Agency carries out its duties based on the rights determined by the Constitution of the Republic of Azerbaijan. These rights include:

- To organize and manage the activity of "DOST" centers;
- To make arrangements for "DOST" centers on "one stop shop", as well as on the principles of efficiency, citizen satisfaction, transparency, courtesy, responsibility and flexibility, as well as make suggestions on the organization of the Ministry's relevant bodies in "DOST" centers, to ensure that the relevant institutions are implemented in a related manner;
- Control over the activities of "DOST" centers;
- To evaluate the activities of "DOST" centers, to make proposals for the improvement and improvement of the quality of services provided and to take action to implement them;
- Take measures to organize the rendering of mobile services in "DOST" centers;
- Coordinate the activities of state bodies and bodies, local self-government bodies, legal entities and individuals in the relevant field;
- to make comments and suggestions on activities, analyze and summarize, analytic materials;
- to conduct surveys among those in need of social protection and rehabilitation, to study their problems, to protect their rights, and to make proposals on meeting their needs;
- To participate in the development, improvement and implementation of general conditions, forms and mechanisms of social protection and safeguard measures together with relevant ministries of the Ministry;
- to participate in the preparation and implementation of draft normative legal acts in the relevant field;
- prepare and submit proposals to ensure full automatization of the services provided in the relevant field;
- When applying for service at "DOST" centers, look through the application and make decisions on the ground where it is possible to document the outcome of the appeal;
- Establishment of information systems for the provision of electronic services in the relevant field with the relevant structural subdivisions of the Ministry, ensuring their integration with other state information systems;
- clerical work and adoption of citizens in accordance with the requirements of relevant normative legal acts;
- To organize additional training and professional development of staff, including organization of trainings on the organization of ethics courses for citizens serving the citizens at "DOST" centers, citizen flow management, citizen meeting, listening, reading and other skills;
- To improve the services provided by "DOST" centers and to implement projects and programs to support citizens in the relevant field, to cooperate with relevant public and private financial institutions, as well as legal and physical persons;
- Regularly informing the public regularly on informative and informative updates about the normative legal acts related to the services rendered in "DOST" centers;
- Involve volunteers (especially young professionals and students) in the activities of "DOST" centers, take measures to encourage them, and cooperate with educational institutions for this purpose;
- to take measures to protect the state and commercial secrets, as well as the confidentiality regime;
- informing the public of its activities, establishing and maintaining the website, and publicly disclosing public information set out in the law on that site and ensuring that this information is constantly updated;
- Providing propaganda and propaganda through mass media and social networks, as well as establishing a "call center" and organizing its effective functioning in order to promptly inform the public about the activity of the Ministry, the Agency and the "DOST" centers;
- to make proposals for the preparation of professional specialists in the field of activity and the preparation of educational programs, to participate in their implementation;
- To take measures to improve the structure and performance of the Agency;
- procurement of goods (works and services) related to their activities, as well as holding tenders and concluding contracts in accordance with the law to meet the needs in the relevant field;
- conduct research on issues related to the activities, create working groups and commissions;
- to ensure that the budget allocations, loans, grants and other financial resources allocated to the relevant area are effectively used; and other

== Functions of Agency ==
DOST governmental agency provides all services of Azerbaijani Labor and Social Protection Ministry and other related services in one place (using convenient "Single Window" system). Main spheres of Agency's services include, but not limited:

- Labor
- Employment
- Social security
- Appointment of pensions
- Social benefits
- Targeted social assistance
- Disability assessment
- Disability determination
- Banking services
- Lawyer consultation
- Insurance services, etc.

DOST centers also allow provide methodological assistance to employers and employees. DOST centers have the competence of registration of labor contracts. Furthermore, in special cases agency is providing unemployed people with an opportunity of self-employment, although providing a new system of disability determination.

DOST centers also have a duty to create and update the unified portal for vacancies, registering CV-s of people seeking employment. DOST agency is operating on a commercial basis (self-financing autonomous principle), and most of the services are paid.

== See also ==
- ASAN service
