= Emin Sabitoglu =

Soviet-Azerbaijani composer (1937–2000)

- Born: 2 November 1937
- Origin: Baku, Azerbaijan
- Died: 18 November 2000 (aged 63)
- Genres: Film score; classical; musical comedies
- Occupations: Composer, music editor

Emin Sabitoglu (Azerbaijani: Emin Sabitoğlu, real name Emin Sabit oghlu Mahmudov (Emin Sabit oğlu Mahmudov); 2 November 1937 – 18 November 2000) was a Soviet Azerbaijani composer, author of a lot of well-known Azerbaijani songs and music for films. People's Artist of Azerbaijan.

== Biography ==
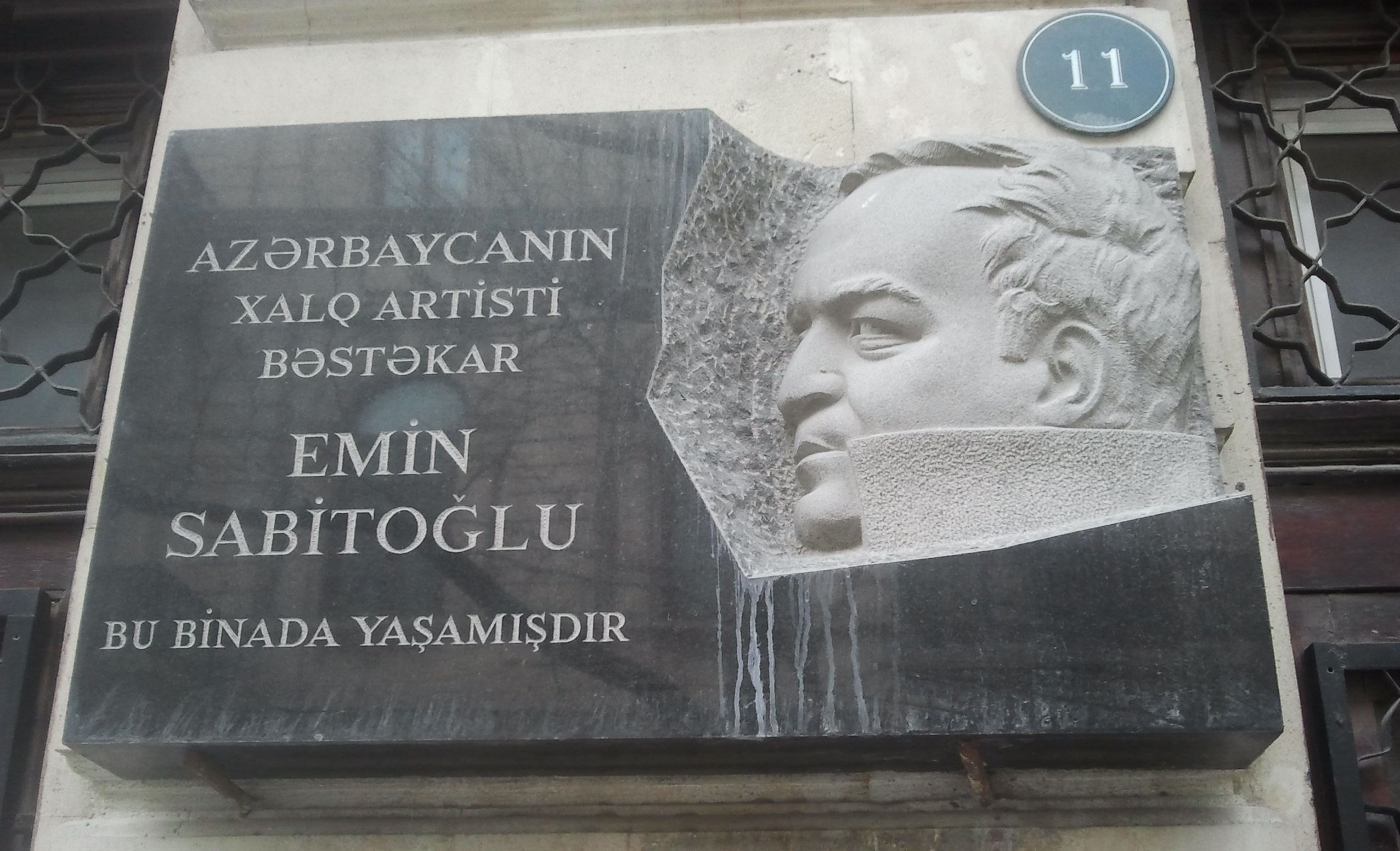
Plaque on building where Soviet Azerbaijani composer Emin Sabitoglu lived in Baku

Emin Sabitoglu was born on 2 November 1937, in the family of Azerbaijani writer Sabit Rahman. After graduating from musical school in Baku, he entered Gara Garayev’s class at Baku Conservatoire, in 1954. Two years later he was transferred to the Moscow State Conservatory named after Tchaikovsky (Yuri Shaporin’s class). In 1961, he began to work as a music editor in the film studio “Azerbaijanfilm". In consecutive years he worked as the art director of the State Philarmony, and also taught at State Conservatory named after Uzeyir Hajibeyov. He wrote poems for several pieces of music. However, several music genres have been the major part of his works. He composed more than 600 songs, 9 musical comedies, and pieces of music for nearly 40 films. He has numerous compositions written for plays. The composer himself does not know exactly. Along with theaters in Baku, he composed music for theaters in Sumgayit, Ganja, Lankaran, Mingachevir, and Nakchivan.

Emin Sabitoglu died on 18 November 2000 in Baku.

== Creativity ==
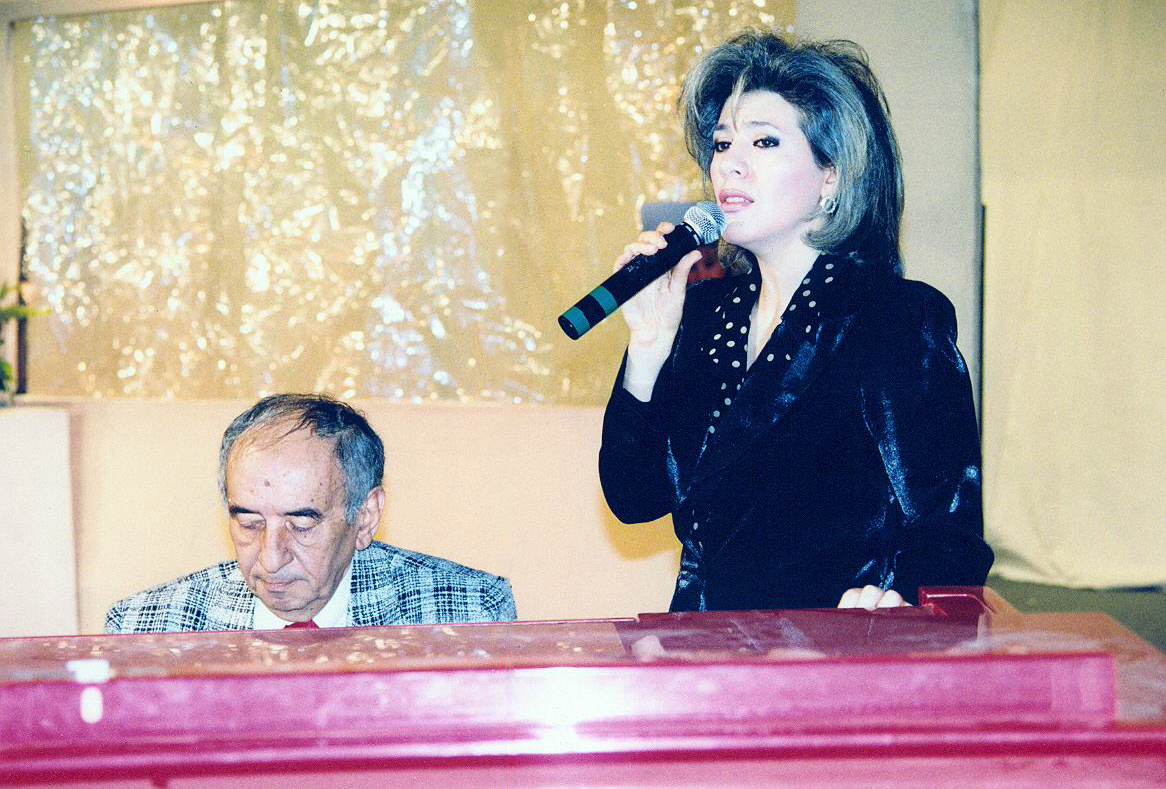
Emin Sabitoglu, Brilliant Dadashova

Emin Sabitoglu is the author of a lot of works in different music genres. Particularly, he is the author of one symphony, three symphonic poems, three cantatas, string quartet and a poem for violin and fortepiano. But some music genres make up the main part of his creativity. He is the author of more than 600 songs, nine musical comedies, and songs for many films. Besides that, Emin Sabitoglu created a large number of musical compositions for theatrical spectacles.

== Movie career ==
Otel otagi (1998) Otel otagi 8.0 Composer (as Emin Sabitoglu) 1998

Tähminä (1993) Tähminä 8.6 Composer 1993

Sem dney posle ubiystva (1991) Sem dney posle ubiystva 6.4 Composer 1991

Villain (1987) (1988) Villain (1987) 7.3 Composer 1988

Özgä ömür (1987) Özgä ömür 7.9 Composer 1987

Firangiz Mutallimova, Yashar Nuri, and Hasanagha Turabov in Bäyin ogurlanmasi (1985) Bäyin ogurlanmasi 8.4 Composer 1985

Hasanagha Turabov in Atlari yaharlayin (1984) Atlari yaharlayin 8.5 Composer 1984

Evlari kondalan yar (1982) Evlari kondalan yar 7.8 TV Movie composer 1982

Pered zakrytoy dveryu (1982) Pered zakrytoy dveryu 7.5 Composer 1982

Onun balali sevgisi (1980) Onun balali sevgisi 7.6 Composer 1980

Prostite nas (1979) Prostite nas 7.9 Composer 1979

Istintaq (1979) Istintaq 7.8 Composer 1979

Hasanagha Turabov in Yubiley dante (1978) Yubiley dante 6.8 Composer 1978

Oasis in the Fire (1978) Oasis in the Fire 5.4 Composer 1978

Bayqus gäländä (1978) Bayqus gäländä 7.4 Composer 1978

Den rozhdeniya (1978) Den rozhdeniya 8.3 TV Movie Composer (as Emin Sabitoglu) 1978

Dädä Qorqud (1975) Dädä Qorqud 8.1 Composer 1975

Dörd bazar günü (1974) Dörd bazar günü Composer 1974

Hijran 8.4 TV Movie Composer 1973

The Day Passed (1971) The Day Passed 8.6 Composer (as Emin Sabitoglu) 1971

Who We Love More (1965) Who We Love More Composer (segment Dag Mesäsindän Kecärkän) 1965

== Family ==
- Emin Sabitoglu is writer Sabit Rahman's and Ismat khanum Iravanski's son. Ismat Khanum Iravanski was from House of Iravanski.
- Musician, Jeyran Mahmudova is his daughter.
- His wife is singer, Khadija Abbasova
