= Oktay Takalak =

French boxer

Personal information
- Nationality: French
- Born: Oktay Takalak; August 6, 1990 (age 36) Amberieu, Ain, France
- Weight: Featherweight

Boxing career
- Stance: Orthodox

Boxing record
- Total fights: 16
- Wins: 16
- Win by KO: 5
- Losses: 0

Oktay Takalak (born August 6, 1990) is a French boxer and France featherweight titleholder. He reclaimed the title after winning the fight against Sofiane Bellahcene in three rounds, defeating him by TKO, for the vacant title after the injury of Anthony Buquet. He first won the title in 2013, but had given it up when he went on an American tour for eleven months. While there he trained in the Mayweather Boxing Gym. He failed to get a contract for a US match, sending him home to France and forcing him to start over at his former club in Lyon.

He is the current and first WBC Francophone featherweight titleholder after a fight against Mikael Mkrtchyan that he won on points. This title makes him the champion of the 57 French speaking countries in the world that acknowledge the title.

== Titles ==
Title	Since	Title defenses
France Featherweight Title	March 6, 2015	0
WBC Francophone Featherweight Title	February 5, 2016	0
