= Oktay Afandiyev =

Azerbaijani historian (1926–2013)

Oktay Abdulkerim oglu Afandiyev
- Oqtay Əbdülkərim oğlu Əfəndiyev
- Born: 26 March 1926; Baku, Azerbaijan SSR
- Died: 26 February 2013 (aged 86); Baku, Azerbaijan Republic
- Education: Moscow Institute of Oriental Studies
- Spouse: Türkan Afandiyeva
- Children: Vafa Afandiyeva
- Scientific career
- Fields: History
- Workplaces: Institute of History of Azerbaijan National Academy of Sciences; Baku State University; Marmara University; Khazar University
- Doctoral advisor: Boris Zakhoder

Oktay Abdulkerim oglu Afandiyev (Azerbaijani: Oqtay Əbdülkərim oğlu Əfəndiyev; 26 March 1926 – 26 February 2013) was an Azerbaijani historian, Orientalist, Doctor of Historical Sciences, Professor, Corresponding Member of Azerbaijan National Academy of Sciences and founder of the Azerbaijan School of Safavid Studies.

== Early life ==
Oktay Afandiyev was born on March 26, 1926, in the town of Baku in Azerbaijan.

== Academic career ==
He entered Baku State University in 1945, but after a year he continued his education in Moscow. He graduated from the Moscow Institute of Oriental Studies and in 1955 defended his doctoral dissertation. In 1993, he became a professor. He worked at the Institute of History of Azerbaijan National Academy of Sciences for about sixty years. He was a corresponding member of ANAS since 2001.

He mainly studied the Safavid state and its organizations. Afandiyev was also one of the authors of the "Azerbaijani Soviet Encyclopedia", the multi-volume "History of the USSR" published in Moscow, the "Encyclopedia of Soviet History", the "Islamic Encyclopedia" published in Istanbul. O. Afandiyev was a member of the editorial board of the "Azerbaijan National Encyclopedia".

He worked at Baku State University, Marmara University and Khazar University. From 1994 to 2004, he worked at Khazar University, where he was the director of the Institute for Caucasus and Central Asian Studies.

His were referred to by such researchers as W. Floor, H. Halm, I. P. Petrushevsky, G. R Romer, Jean-Paul Roux, F. Sumer, Y. E. Bregel, I. Melikoff, A. Allouch, S. Kitagawa, O. Altstadt, K. Kutsia, E. Gruner, A. Yaman, M. Temizkan, N. Chetinkaya, E. I. Vasilieva, L. P. Smirnova and others.

== Selected works ==
=== Books ===
- Образование азербайджанского государства Сефевидов в начале XVI в.. — Б., 1961.
- Азербайджанское государство Сефевидов в XVI веке / Редактор академик А. А. Ализаде. — Б.: Элм, 1981. — 306 с.
- Azərbaycan Səfəvilər Dövləti (азерб.). — Б., 1993. — 304 с.
- Azərbaycan Səfəvilər dövləti (азерб.). — Б.: Şərq-Qərb, 2007. — 407 с.

=== Articles in academic journals ===
- К некоторым вопросам внутренней и внешней политики Шаха Исмаила (1502 — 1524 гг.) // Труды Института истории АН Азерб. ССР.. — Б., 1957. — Т. XII. — С. 150–180.
- Из истории социальной и политической борьбы в Азербайджане на рубеже XV — XVI вв. // Краткие сообщения Института востоковедения АН СССР. — 1960. — No. 38. — С. 35–40.
- О малоизвестном источнике XVI в. по истории Сефевидов // Известия АН Азерб. ССР, серия обществ. наук. — 1964. — No. 2. — С. 61–68.
- Исмаил I // Советская историческая энциклопедия. — 1965. — Т. VI. — С. 351.
- Сефевие // Советская историческая энциклопедия. — 1969. — Т. XII. — С. 815.
- Сефевидов государство // Советская историческая энциклопедия. — 1969. — Т. XII. — С. 815. (совместно с А. П. Новосельцевым)
- Узун-Хасан // Советская историческая энциклопедия. — 1973. — Т. XXIV. — С. 708.
- Le role des tribus de la langue turque dans la creation de l'Etat Safavide (фр.) // Turcica. — 1975. — No 6. — P. 24–33.
- Сефевиды // Большая советская энциклопедия. — 1976. — Т. XXIII. — С. 325. (совместно с А. П. Новосельцевым)
- Шахсевены // Советская историческая энциклопедия. — 1976. — Т. XVI. — С. 145.
- О периодизации истории Тебриза в ХV-ХVI вв. // Товарно-денежные отношения на Ближнем и Среднем Востоке в эпоху средневековья. — М., 1979. — С. 237–245.
- О подати тамга и ее значении в городской экономике Азербайджана и сопредельных стран в XV— XVI вв. // Ближний и Средний Восток. Товарно-денежные отношения при феодализме.. — М., 1980. — С. 238–243. (совместно с Ш. Б. Фарзалиевым)
- Сефевиды и Ардебильское святилище шейха Сефи // Бартольдовские чтения 1982 г. Тезисы докладов и сообщений.. — М., 1982.
- On Turkic language tribes in Azerbaijan and Eastern Anatolia in the XV-XVI centuries (англ.) // V. Milletlerarası Türkiye Sosyal ve İktisat Tarihi Kongresi: İstanbul, 21-25 Ağustos 1989 : tebliğ özetleri. — İs.: Marmara Üniversitesi Türkiyat Araştırma ve Uygulama Merkezi, 1989.
- Safavi Devletinin Kuruluşunda Türk Aşiretlerinin Rolü (тур.) // Yabancı Araştırmacılar Gözüyle Alevîlik: Tuttum Aynayı Yüzüme Ali Göründü Gözüme. — İs.: Ant Yayınları, 1989.
- Немного о карабахских меликствах // The History of the Caucasus. The scientific-public almanac. — Б., 2001. — No. 3.
- Карабах в составе государств Каракоюнлу, Аккоюнлу и Сефевидов (XV-XV1I вв.) // Карабах. Очерки истории и культуры. — Б., 2004.
- Şirvan'da Osmanlı Hâkimiyetinin yerleşmesi ve ilk Osmanlı idari taksimatına dair (тур.) // Kebikeç: insan bilimleri için kaynak araştırmaları dergisi. — An.: Kebikeç Yayınları, 2007.

== Awards ==
- Order of the Badge of Honour (1986)
- Shohrat Order (2004)
