= Jeyran Mahmudova =

Azerbaijani musicologist (born 1964)

- Ceyran Mahmudova
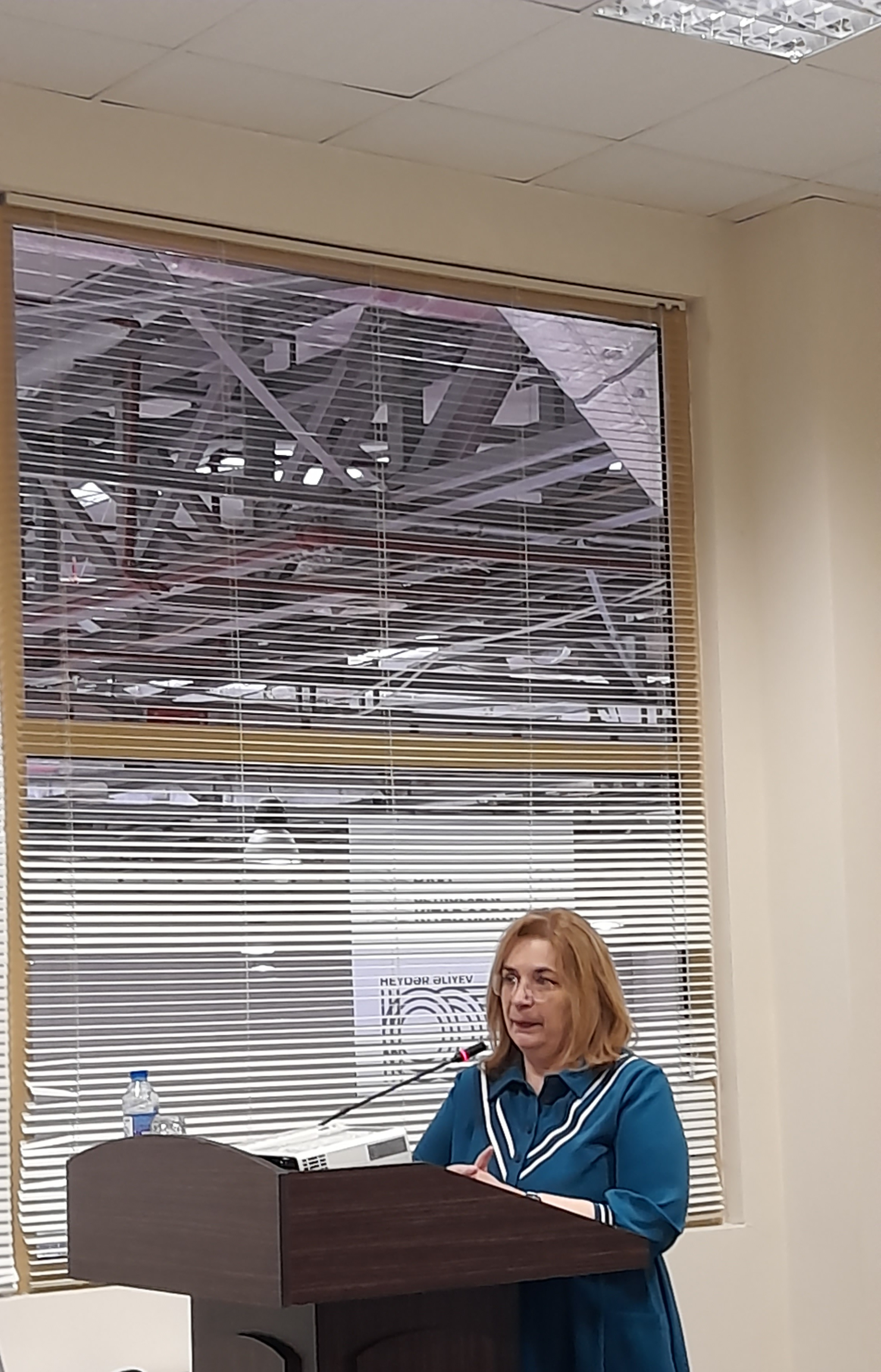
- Born: 19 July 1964 (age 62); Baku, Azerbaijan SSR, Soviet Union
- Citizenship: Azerbaijan
- Education: Azerbaijan State Conservatory, Institute of Architecture and Arts of the Azerbaijan National Academy of Sciences
- Scientific career
- Fields: Musicology, Art history
- Workplaces: Azerbaijan State University of Culture and Arts
- Website: https://www.admiu.edu.az/enen.php?go=rector

Jeyran Emin gizi Mahmudova (Azerbaijani: Ceyran Emin qızı Mahmudova; born July 19, 1964) is an Azerbaijani scientist specializing in musicology and art history. She has been the rector of Azerbaijan State University of Culture and Arts since July 30, 2018.
