= Kərimbəyli, Salyan =

Kərimbəyli
- Municipality
- Location within Azerbaijan
- Coordinates: 39°47′31″N 48°57′07″E
- Country: Azerbaijan
- Rayon: Salyan

Population
  - Total: 1,921
- Time zone: UTC+4 (AZT)
  - Summer (DST): UTC+5 (AZT)

Kərimbəyli (also, Kerimbeyli) is a village and municipality in the Salyan Rayon of Azerbaijan. It has a population of 1,921.
