= İbadulla =

- Municipality
- Location within Azerbaijan
- Coordinates: 39°27′46″N 44°58′11″E
- Country: Azerbaijan
- Autonomous republic: Nakhchivan
- District: Sharur

Population (2005)
  - Total: 1,365
- Time zone: UTC+4 (AZT)

İbadulla is a village and municipality in the Sharur District of Nakhchivan Autonomous Republic, Azerbaijan. It is located 10 km in the south from the district center, on the bank of the Arpachay River, on the plain. Its population is busy with farming and animal husbandry. There are secondary school, library, club and a medical center in the village. It has a population of 1,365. The Şortəpə settlement of the Bronze Age has been found in the area.

== Etymology ==
The settlement was founded by the person named İbadulla (عبادالله) in the past and the village is related with his name.
