= Kərimbəyli, Babek =

Kərimbəyli
- Location within Azerbaijan
- Coordinates: 39°15′10″N 45°27′14″E
- Country: Azerbaijan
- Autonomous republic: Nakhchivan

Population (2005)
  - Total: 1,495
- Time zone: UTC+4 (AZT)

Kərimbəyli (also, Karimbayli, known as Leninabad until 1999) is a village and municipality in the Babek District of Nakhchivan, Azerbaijan. It is located 11 km in the north-east from the district center, on the left bank of the Nakhchivanchay River, on the plain. Its population is busy with grain-growing, vegetable-growing and animal husbandry. There are secondary school, music school, culture house, club, mosque and a hospital in the village. It has a population of 1,495.

== Etymology ==
The settlements were founded as result of settling the karimbayli tribe who was the part of the tribal unity of the gazakhli tribes. Karimbayli tribe has moved to Karabakh from Gazakh district, and later laid the foundation a number of settlements in the regions, including in the Nakhchivan region.
