= Azerbaijan State University of Culture and Arts =

State-owned university in Baku, Azerbaijan

- Azərbaycan Dövlət Mədəniyyət və İncəsənət Universiteti
- Type: Public
- Established: 1923
- Rector: Jeyran Mahmudova
- Students: 7258 (2010 est.)
- Location: Baku, Azerbaijan
- Campus: Urban
- Transportation: Line 2 Elmlər Akademiyası metro station
- Website: www.admiu.edu.az

Azerbaijan State University of Culture and Arts (ASUCA; Azerbaijani: Azərbaycan Dövlət Mədəniyyət və İncəsənət Universiteti) was founded in 1923 on the basis of the Baku Theatrical College. It is Azerbaijan's main state-funded institution of higher education in performing arts.

== Background ==
Azerbaijan State University of Culture and Arts, upon its establishment in 1923, operated under the name of Theatrical Institute. The first admitted students were educated in the fields of theatrical performance, acting and filmmaking. In 1954, the Theatrical Institute was named after the famous actor Mirzaagha Aliyev. Since 1959, the school has also trained specialists in Cultural Education and, since 1963, in Applied Decorative Arts.

In 1968, the Theatrical Institute was renamed into Azerbaijan State Institute of Arts. During 1981–1991, a number of new disciplines were introduced into the curriculum, including Painting, Drawing, Sculpture, Art Specialties, Theatre, Cinema, Culturology, and the Industry of Art.

In 2000, the institute was reorganised and granted university status, becoming the Azerbaijan State University of Culture and Arts.

== Faculties ==
- Faculty of Theater arts
- Faculty of Audiovisual arts
- Faculty of Art
- Faculty of Music arts
- Faculty of Culturology

== Notable alumni ==
- Malakkhanim Ayyubova, Azeri folk singer
- Arif Aziz, painter
- Arif Babayev, film director
- Bahram Bagirzade, actor and film director
- Alakbar Huseynov, actor, puppeteer, entertainer, director
- Hasan Mammadov, theater and cinema actor
- Ulduz Rafili-Aliyeva, theatre director
- Nijat Rahimov, actor
- Kazim Abdullayev, actor
- Azerpasha Nematov, theatre director
