= Shohrat Order =

Azerbaijani award

Shohrat Order Şöhrət ordeni
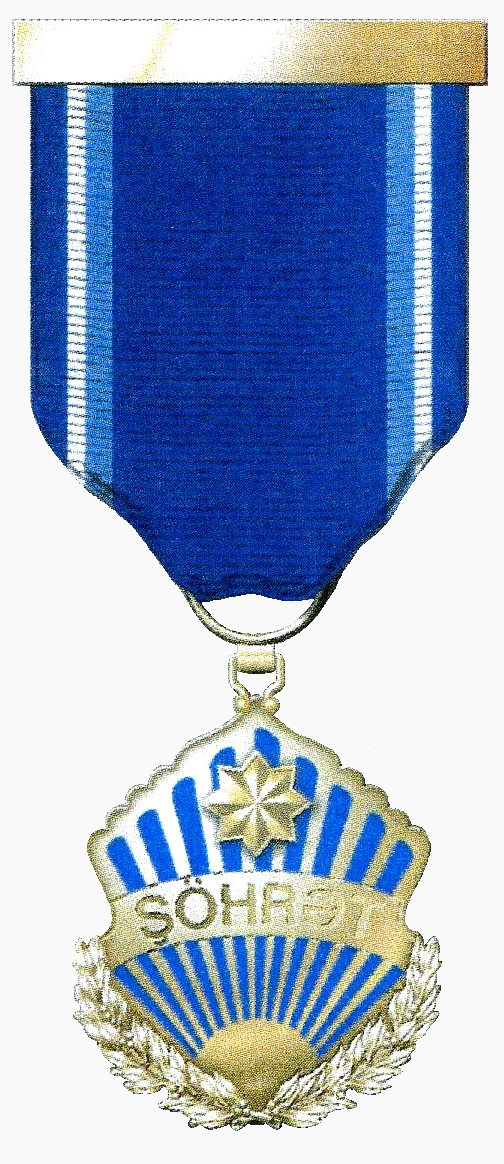
- Type: Individual Award
- Awarded for: sustained, selfless service of the highest order, long lasting contributions to development and progress in economic, scientific, socio-cultural fields
- Description: crescent formed order with Azerbaijani insignia
- Presented by: President of Azerbaijan
- Eligibility: Azerbaijani government's civilian personnel, citizens and non-citizens, foreign civilians
- Clasps: 1
- Status: Active
- Established: 6 December 1993 (Decree No. 757), revised on 6 February 1998

Precedence
- Next (higher): Azerbaijani Flag Order
- Next (lower): Sharaf Order

Shohrat Order (Azerbaijani: Şöhrət ordeni), translated as Order of Glory, is an award presented by the President of the Republic of Azerbaijan.

== History and status ==
The order was created by Decree No. 757 of then President of Azerbaijan, Heydar Aliyev and ratified by National Assembly of Azerbaijan on 6 December 1993. The Shohrat Order is given to the citizens of Republic of Azerbaijan, foreign nationals and non-citizens for the following services:

- special contributions to the economic, scientific, socio and cultural development;
- special contributions to establishing and strengthening of peace and friendships among and development of cooperation between peoples;
- services yielding extraordinary and professional results in the industrial, transportation, communications, construction fields as well as in other spheres of economic activity;
- special contributions in science, education and health sector.

The order is pinned to the left side of the chest. If there are any other orders or medals, the Shohrat Order follows Sheref Order (Azerbaijani: Şərəf Ordeni; Order of Pride).

== Description ==
Shohrat Order is in the form of horizontal crescent, with composition of national ornaments supplemented within the laurus branches with leaves and sun with un upward-shining rays. The composition is made of silver colored with gold, attached to a blue-white colored ribbon bar with five edges. The order comes in size 32 mm (1.3 in) by 38 mm (1.5 in), the ribbon bar - 27 mm (1.1 in) by 47.5 mm (1.87 in). Across the upward rays runs a rainbow-shaped golden belt connecting the tips of laurus branches and reading the word Şöhrət (Glory). The rear side of the order is polished and has an engraved order number.

=== Previous versions ===
The original version of the order was in gold, on a medal with an eight-edged star and national ornaments with red and green colors. On the foreground, there were golden laurus branches surrounding a colored bird figure. The upper part of the medal included an eight-pointed star. The lower part had a rainbow-shaped ribbon reading Şöhrət. The order was revised on 6 February 1998 to the current version.

== Recipients ==
- Chingiz Abdullayev, Azerbaijani writer, novelist
- Safar Abiyev, former Minister of Defense of Azerbaijan Republic
- Vasif Adigozalov, Azerbaijani composer
- Oktay Afandiyev, Azerbaijani historian of the Safavid state
- Franghiz Ahmadova, opera singer
- Elmira Akhundova, Azerbaijani writer and politician
- Telman Aliev, Azerbaijani academician
- Natig Aliyev, Minister of Industry and Energy of Azerbaijan Republic
- Ramiz Asker, PhD, thinker, linguist, writer, translator, educator.
- Mukhtar Babayev, Azerbaijani politician
- Nizami Bahmanov (posthumously), former MP, Head of Shusha Rayon executive power.
- Akif Jafar Hajiyev, Azerbaijani mathematician
- Aga-bala Hajiyev, Head of the Office of the Cabinet of Ministers of the Republic of Azerbaijan since 2003.
- Zarosh Hamzayeva, Azerbaijani actress
- Faiq Hasanov, Azerbaijani chess player
- Zakir Hasanov, Minister of Defence of Azerbaijan since 2013.
- Südaba Hesenova, Azerbaijani magistrate, former Minister of Justice and 2nd President of the Supreme Court.
- Mansum Ibrahimov, Azerbaijani mugam musician
- Nazim Ismayilov, Director of Azerbaijan National Agency for Mine Action (ANAMA)
- Tukezban Ismayilova, Azerbaijani singer, khananda
- Roza Jalilova, Azerbaijani dancer
- Yavar Jamalov, Minister of Defence Industry of Azerbaijan
- Shamsaddin Khanbabayev, MP, Head of Khachmaz Rayon executive power.
- Nizami Khudiyev, MP, former executive director of AzTV
- Hüseyin Kıvrıkoğlu, Chief of Chief of General Staff of Turkish Armed Forces
- Joseph Kobzon, Russian singer.
- Novruz Mammadov, Azerbaijani academician
- Fikrat Mammadov, Azerbaijani politician
- Yashar Nuri, Azerbaijani actor
- Hidayat Orujov, Azerbaijani writer and former Chairman of the State Committee for Work with Religious Organizations of Azerbaijan Republic
- Fazila Samadova, Azerbaijani chemist
- Firangiz Sharifova, Azerbaijani actress
- Elmira Süleymanova, Azerbaijani chemist and incumbent Ombudsman.
- Zalimkhan Yagub (twice), Azerbaijani poet
- Khumar Zulfugarova, Azerbaijani dancer, choreographer
- Alexander (Ishein), Archbishop of Baku and Azerbaijan from 1999 to 2021
- Rafiga Huseynzade, Azerbaijani scientist, a Candidate of Geologico-Mineralogical Sciences
