= Ogtay Samadov =

Azerbaijani nuclear physicist

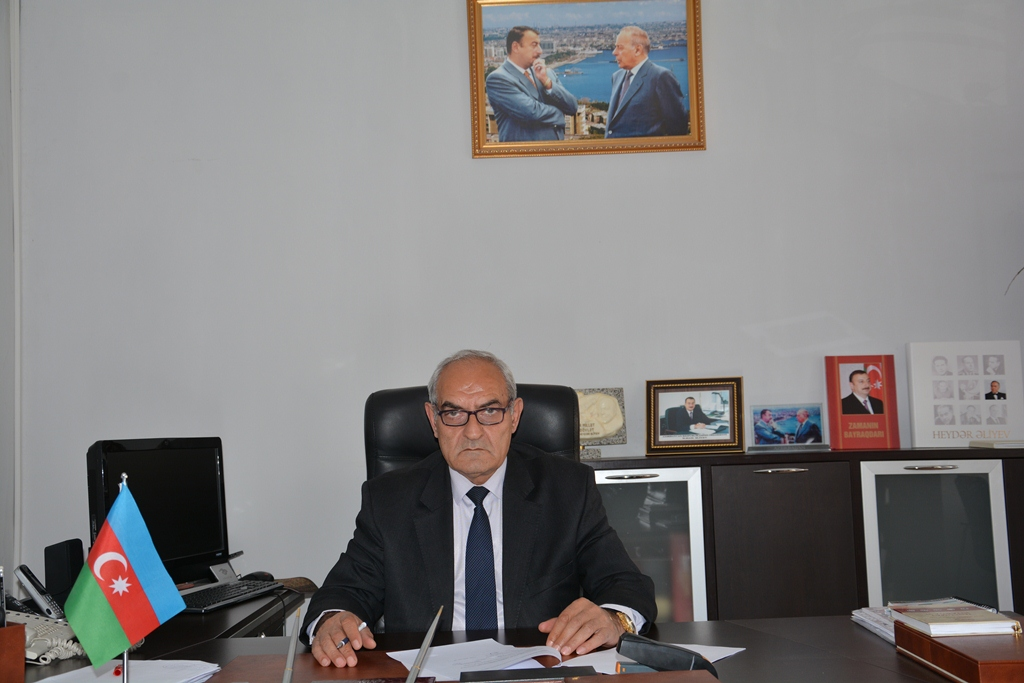
Səmədov Oqtay Əbil oğlu

Ogtay Abiloglu Samadov or Samedov (Azerbaijani: Oqtay Əbil oğlu Səmədov; Russian: Огтай Абиль оглы Самедов; born 5 April 1952) is an Azerbaijani nuclear physicist who since 2015 has been director of the Institute of Radiation Problems of Azerbaijan National Academy of Sciences.

== Early life and education ==
Samadov was born in Xol Qarabucaq, Neftchala in a family of teachers. In 1969, he graduated from the secondary school No.2 named after Nizami in Salyan and in 1975, he successfully graduated from the physical department of Azerbaijan State University (now Baku State University). O. Samadov worked as a physics teacher at Kholgarabujag village secondary school in 1975–1979. In 1979, he worked as a head scientific worker in "Radiation Physics of Ferroelectrics" laboratory of the Institute of Radiation Problems.

== Scientific activities ==
Ogtay Samadov entered post-graduate course in the Institute of Radiation Problems in 1980. He defended thesis on “Study of dielectric and pyroelectric properties of phase transitions in spontaneously polarized crystals” in 1988 and got a degree of PhD in physics and mathematics.

Then, Samadov's further scientific activity was dedicated to the study of physical properties of relaxor ferroelectrics formed on the basis of TlInS_{2} and TlGaSe_{2} crystals and great practically important scientific results were obtained in this field. In 2006, he defended his doctoral dissertation on this subject. Superconductive compounds were obtained in Samadov's research and the superconductive temperature of these compounds was defined. The influence of radiation on superconductive temperature and special resistance was studied. Nanodomain relaxor state was studied by dielectric and electric measurements of irradiated, alloyed and intercalated semiconductor ferroelectrics.

Samadov is the author of the first studies on the field of radiation physics and technology of ferroelectrics, conducted in Azerbaijan. The main research in the field of the radiation influence on phase transitions in spontaneously polarized crystals with oxygen-octahedral structure was conducted by him.

The scientist began his scientific research with the study of the influence of electric and magnetic fields on structural phase transitions in different ferro and antiferroelectrics.

He is the author of more than 200 articles on radiation material sciences in journals including Ferroelectrics, Fizika tverdogo tela, Physica Status Solidi, International Journal of Theoretical and Applied Nano technology and others. He was elected a corresponding member of Azerbaijan National Academy of Sciences in 2001.

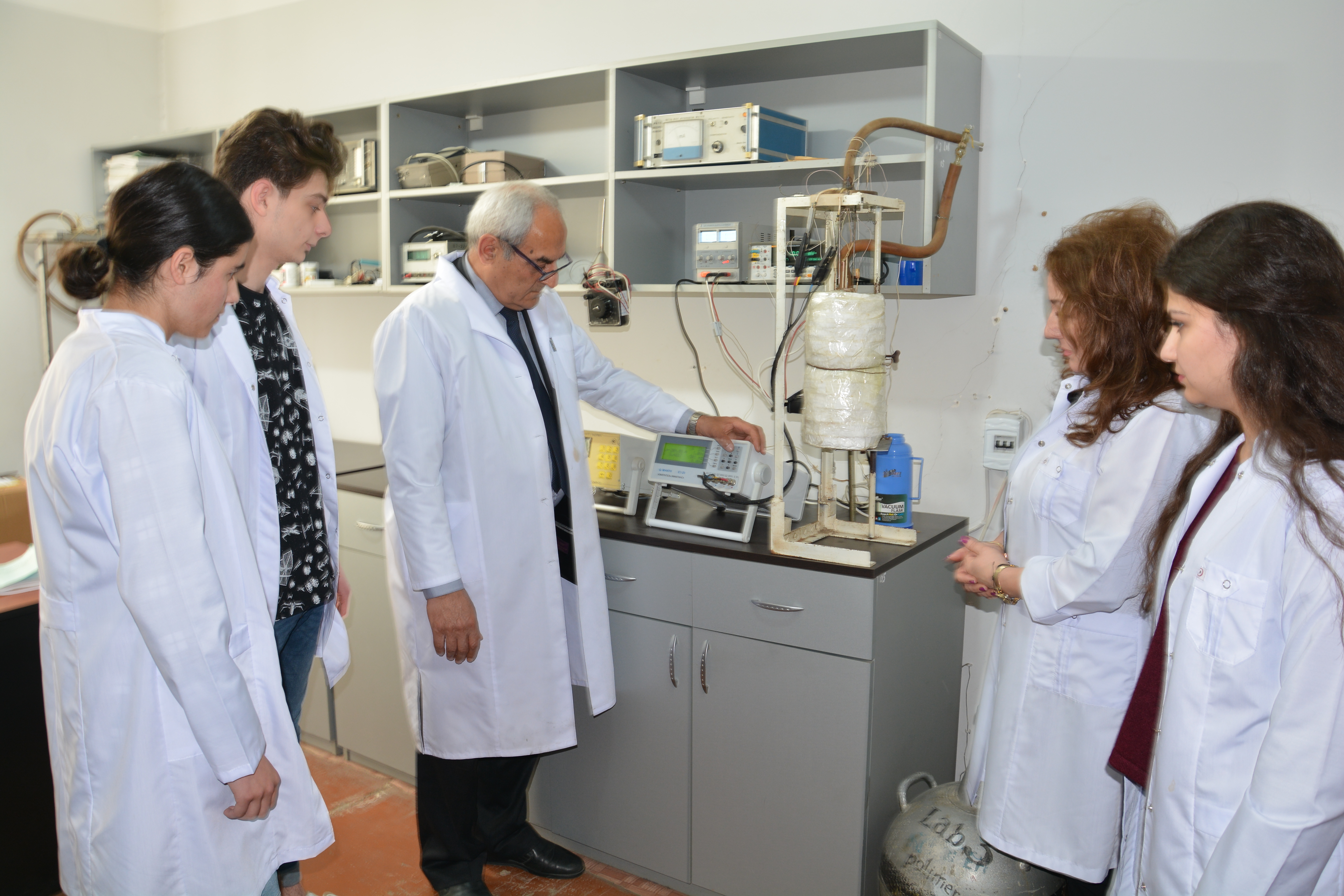
Ogtay Samadov and laboratory employees in the research process

In 2013, Samadov got “professor” scientific name by the decision of Higher Attestation Commission under the President of Azerbaijan. In 2014, he was selected as a head of the laboratory of the Radiation Physics of Disordered Solids in the Institute of Radiation Problems of Azerbaijan National Academy of Sciences; in 2015, he was director of the same Institute. He organized expeditions to reveal the distribution of radioactive isotopes and heavy metals in frontline, transboundary waters and sediments in order to ensure nuclear and radiation safety of the country and obtained results were presented to the state authorities. In order to prevent nuclear and radioactive materials smuggling and trafficking and nuclear terrorism in nuclear security and radiation safety of Azerbaijan, installation of special monitoring equipments and their maintenance in operating state in border crossing points, staff training courses for border and customs agency employees have been implemented out by the Institute of Radiation Problems with the support of the National Nuclear Security Administration within the U.S. Department of Energy. Development of new detectors for detecting the ionizing rays and expansion of radiation instrument making based on them in our country have been carried out.

O. Samadov is the head of the National INIS (International Nuclear Information System) Centre of Azerbaijan of the International Atomic Energy Agency (IAEA). He has been the winner of several projects of Science Development Fund under the president of Azerbaijan Republic, Science and Technology Center in Ukraine and these projects have been completed successfully. He has been selected a member of Organizing Committee of “Nuclear Sciences and Technologies” International Scientific Forum to be held in Almaty, Kazakhstan in September 2017. Has been elected as a corresponding member of Azerbaijan National Academy of Sciences on May 2, 2017.

O. Samadov has been engaged in studying the influence of external factors on phase transitions of ferroelectric and antiferroelectric and summarizing the achieved results, established the regularities for the first and second phase transitions in spontaneously polarized crystals for the first time. By injecting impurities with various ionic radius to TlİnS_{2} and TlGaSe_{2}crystals, he has studied their dielectric, pyroelectric, electric properties and the influence of γ-rays on these properties. He has shown that when alloying TlİnS_{2} crystal with Yan-Teylor atoms, the obtained compounds show the properties characteristic for relaxor ferroelectrics.

Studying the dielectric and electric relaxation, impedance spectrum, the scientist has observed superionic conductivity in TlGaTe_{2}, TlİnTe_{2} and TlInSe_{2}crystalsfor the first time.

== Staff training ==
Ogtay Samadov established a scientific school on pyroelectric, dielectric properties of ferro-antiferro and semiconductor-ferroelectrics, trained4 Ph.Ds and 1 Dr. of sciences. At present, 2 Doctor of Sciences and 3 Ph.D. studies in radiation material sciences are being successfully conducted under his leadership.

== Main scientific achievements ==
1. Regularities for consistent phase transitions in spontaneous-polarized crystals have been given.

2. A new relax or ferroelectrics class has been determined on the base of TlİnS_{2} and TlGaSe_{2} crystals.

3. Superionic conductivity in TlİnS_{2} and TlGaSe_{2} crystals has been observed and its radiation dose dependence kinetics has been studied.

The results of these studies have been published in the form of articles in 33 peer-reviewed scientific journals and 49 articles in Republic publications. He has 1 patent, 109 reports have been made in local and international conferences. Author of 191 scientific works. 43 articles have been published abroad.

== Scientific works ==
- 1. Ferroelectricity and polytypism in TlGaSe_{2} crystals. Solid State Com, 1991, v.77, N.6, 453
- 2. The spontaneous relaxor-ferroelectric transition of TlInS_{2} with cationic impurities. Journal of Optoelectronics and Advanced Materials, 2003, v.5, No.3,276
- 3. Relaxor properties of TlInS_{2} composites with nanodomain state. Ferroelectrics, 2004, v. 298, 275.
- 4. Релаксорные свойства и механизм проводимости γ- облученных кристаллов TllnS_{2}. ФТТ, 2005, т.47, вып. 9, 1665
- 5. Dielectric properties, conduction mechanism and possibility of nanodomain state with quantum dot formation in gamma-irradiated impurity-doped incommensurate TlInS_{2}. Physica Status Solidi A 2006, 203, No. 11, 2845
- 6. Conduction anisotropy of intercalated relaxer TllnS_{2}<Ge>. Ferroelectrics. Russia /CIS/ Baltic/Japan Symposium on Ferroelectricity RCBJSF-9, Vilnius, Lithuania, 2008, 561
- 7. Features of conductivity anisotropy of intercalated nanodimensional relaxor TllnS_{2}<Ge>. Journal Scientific Israel-Technological Advantages Material engineering, 2009, v. 11, no.1,99
- 8. Особенности проводимости γ- облученных кристаллов TlGaTe_{2} с наноцепочечной структурой. ФТП, 2010 том 44, вып.5, 610
- 9. Гигантская диэлектрическая релаксация в кристаллах TlGaТе_{2}. ФТТ, 2011, т.53, вып.8, 1488
- 10. Суперионная проводимость кристаллах В TlGaTe_{2}. ФТП, 2011,том 45, вып.8, 1009
- 11. Superionic conductivity in One-Dimensional Nanofibrous TiGaTe_{2} Crystals. Japanese Journal of Applied Physics. 50(2011), 05FCO9-1
- 12. Суперионная проводимость, эффекты переключения и памяти в кристаллах TlInTe_{2} и TlInSe_{2}. ФТП, 2011, том 45, вып.11, 1441
- 13. Superionic Conductivity and γ –Radiation-Induced Effects in Nanofibrous TlGaTe_{2} Crystals. International Journal of Theoretical and Applied Nanotechnology. vol.1, Issel 1, 2012. p. 20-28.
- 14. Ионная проводимость и диэлектрическая релаксация в кристаллах TlGaТе_{2} облученных γ- квантами. ФТП, 2013, т. 47, в.5, с.696-701.
- 15. Поляризация вызванная объемыми зарядами и ионная проводимость в кристаллах TlInSe_{2.} ФТП, 2014, т. 48, в.4, с.442-447.
- 16. Prospective Application of A^{3}B^{3}C^{6}_{2} Type Semiconductors for Developing Nano-size Electronic Devices. International Journal of Theoretical and Applied Nanotechnology Volume 2, Issue 1, Year 2014 Journal ISSN 1929-2724 DOI: 10.11159/ ijtan.2014.00
- 17. Impedance spectroscopy study of phase transitions to ionic and superionic conductivity states in Ag_{2}S and Ag_{2}Se. Physica Status Solidi C. Apr 24, 2015,1-5 (2015)/ DOI 10.1002/ pssc. 201400366.
- 18. Temperature dependent spectroscopic ellipsometry of AgSe and AgS with phase transitions from ionic to superionic conductivity state. Physica Status Solidi C. 5 May 2015, DOI: 10.1002/pssc.201400367.
