= Kərimbəyli, Sharur =

Kərimbəyli
- Municipality
- Location within Azerbaijan
- Coordinates: 39°35′N 44°55′E
- Country: Azerbaijan
- Autonomous republic: Nakhchivan
- District: Sharur

Population (2005)
  - Total: 1,744
- Time zone: UTC+4 (AZT)

Kərimbəyli (also, Kerimbeyli and Karimbayli) is a village and municipality in the Sharur District of Nakhchivan Autonomous Republic, Azerbaijan. It is located 9 km in the north-west from the district center, on the bank of the Araz River. Its population is busy with farming and animal husbandry. There are secondary school, library, club and a medical center in the village. It has a population of 1,744.

== Etymology ==
The settlement was founded as a result of settlement of the kərimbəyli (karimbayli) tribe, one of the arms of the qazaxlı (gazakhly) tribal unity.
