= Sharur-Daralayaz uezd =

Coordinates: 39°32′45″N 44°58′20″E

Sharur-Daralayaz uezd Шаруро-Даралагёзский уезд
- Uezd
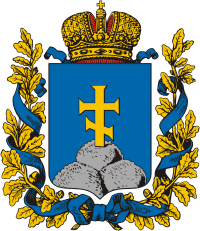
- Coat of arms

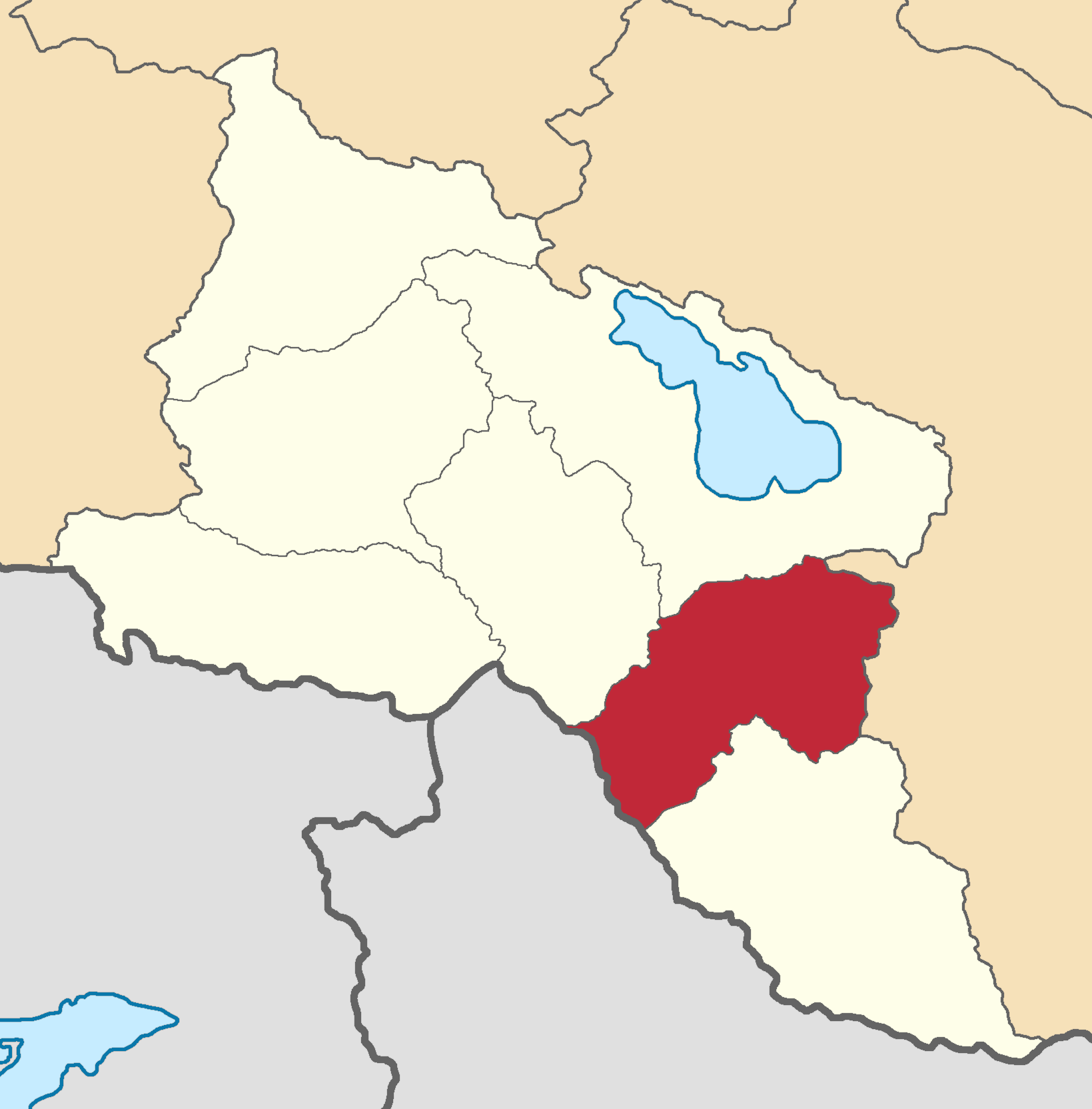
- Location in the Erivan Governorate
- Country: Russian Empire
- Viceroyalty: Caucasus
- Governorate: Erivan
- Established: 1849
- Abolished: 1929
- Capital: Bashnorashen (present-day Sharur)

Area
  - Total: 3,001.64 km^{2} (1,158.94 sq mi)

Population (1916)
  - Total: 90,250
  - Density: 30.07/km^{2} (77.87/sq mi)
  - Rural: 100.00%

The Sharur-Daralayaz uezd (Note: Russian: Шару́ро-Даралагёзскій уѣ́здъ, romanized: Sharúro-Daralagyózsky uyézd; Armenian: Շարուր-Դարալագյազի գավառ, romanized: Šarowr-Daralagyazi gavaṙ; Azerbaijani: شرور و درلاگس قضاسی, romanized: Şərur-Dərələyəs qəzası, or شرور و دارالاگز قضاسی, Şərur-Dərələyəz qəzası) was a county (uezd) of the Erivan Governorate of the Caucasus Viceroyalty of the Russian Empire. It bordered the governorate's Erivan and Nor Bayazet uezds to the north, the Nakhichevan uezd to the south, the Zangezur and Jevanshir uezds of the Elizavetpol Governorate to the east, and Persia to the southwest. It included most of the Vayots Dzor Province of present-day Armenia and the Sharur District of the Nakhchivan exclave of present-day Azerbaijan. The administrative centre of the county was Bashnorashen (present-day Sharur).

== Economy ==
Armenians were mostly concentrated in mountainous Daralayaz, while lowland Sharur was overwhelmingly Tatar. The population in Daralayaz was engaged primarily in cattlebreeding while the residents of Sharur were engaged in agricultural farming and gardening. Manufacturing was not developed in this part of the governorate. Only 47 winemaking enterprises, 299 mills, 89 cotton-cleaning, 4 rice-cleaning factories existed in the Sharur-Daralayaz uezd.

== Geography ==
The geography of the uezd resembled a crater surrounded from the south, north and east by tall mountain ranges of the Lesser Caucasus. The plain, which made up a small part of the uezd, was close to the Aras River, into which the only river irrigating the plains, the Arpa-chay, discharged. The mountainous part of the territory was called Daralayaz and the lowland part was called Sharur. Daralayaz constituted approximately 70% of the whole uezd area and Sharur constituted approximately 30%, even though it included about half of the uezd's population. The Arpa-chay started at the southeastern tip of Lake Sevan (Gokcha) and flowed 107 versts before discharging into the Aras. It had many tributaries, the Alagyoz-chay being the longest. Approximately 12,150 desyatins of the mountainous part of uezd was forested. The temperature in the winter reached -27 °C.

== History ==
The territory of the uezd was part of Persia's Erivan and Nakhchivan Khanates until 1828, when according to the Treaty of Turkmenchay, they were annexed to the Russian Empire. It was administered as part of the Armenian Oblast from 1828 to 1840. In 1844, the Caucasus Viceroyalty was re-established, in which the territory of the Sharur-Daralayaz uezd formed part of the Tiflis Governorate. In 1849, the Erivan Governorate was established, separate from the Tiflis Governorate. It was made up of the Erivan, Nakhchivan, Alexandropol, Nor Bayazet, and Ordubad uezds. Following administrative reforms, the northern part of the Nakhchivan uezd (Daralayaz) was separated to form part of the new Sharur-Daralayaz uezd in 1870.

Throughout 1918–1920, the uezd was heavily contested between forces of the First Republic of Armenia and Azerbaijan Democratic Republic.

After the establishment of Soviet rule in 1920, the territory of the uezd was divided. Daralayaz (modern-day Vayots Dzor) became part of the Armenian SSR and Sharur became part of the Nakhichevan ASSR of the Azerbaijan SSR in accordance with the treaties of Moscow and Kars.

== Administrative divisions ==
The subcounties (uchastoks) of the Sharur-Daralayaz uezd in 1913 were as follows:

Name	1912 population	Area
1-y uchastok (1-й участок)	44,051	747.26 square versts (850.43 km^{2}; 328.35 mi^{2})
2-y uchastok (2-й участок)	44,448	1,890.24 square versts (2,151.21 km^{2}; 830.59 mi^{2})

== Demographics ==
=== Russian Empire Census ===
According to the Russian Empire Census, the Sharur-Daralayaz uezd had a population of 76,538 on 28 January [O.S. 15 January] 1897, including 41,055 men and 35,483 women. The plurality of the population indicated Tatar (Note: Before 1918, Azerbaijanis were generally known as "Tatars". This term, employed by the Russians, referred to Turkic-speaking Muslims of the South Caucasus. After 1918, with the establishment of the Azerbaijan Democratic Republic and "especially during the Soviet era", the Tatar group identified itself as "Azerbaijani".) to be their mother tongue, with significant Armenian and Kurdish speaking minorities.

Linguistic composition of the Sharur-Daralayaz uezd in 1897
Language	Native speakers	%
Tatar	51,560	67.37
Armenian	20,726	27.08
Kurdish	3,761	4.91
Assyrian	331	0.43
Russian	61	0.08
Ukrainian	57	0.07
Polish	12	0.02
Georgian	7	0.01
Jewish	6	0.01
Belarusian	4	0.01
Greek	4	0.01
German	1	0.00
Italian	1	0.00
Other	7	0.01
TOTAL	76,538	100.00

=== Kavkazskiy kalendar ===
According to the 1917 publication of Kavkazskiy kalendar, the Sharur-Daralayaz uezd had a population of 90,25on 14 January [O.S. 1 January] 1916, including 47,399 men and 42,851 women, 88,496 of whom were the permanent population, and 1,754 were temporary residents. The statistics indicated the uezd to be overwhelmingly Shia Muslim with a significant Armenian minority:

Nationality	Number	%
Shia Muslims (Note: Primarily Tatars.)	57,982	64.25
Armenians	29,165	32.32
Kurds	1,861	2.06
Asiatic Christians	598	0.66
Sunni Muslims (Note: Primarily Turco-Tatars.)	511	0.57
Russians	122	0.14
Other Europeans	8	0.01
North Caucasians	3	0.00
TOTAL	90,250	100.00

== Settlements ==
According to the 1897 census, there were 58 settlements in the Sharur-Daralayaz uezd with a population over 500 inhabitants. The religious composition of the settlements was as follows:

Name		Faith			TOTAL		
Russian	Romanized	Armenian Apostolic	Muslim	Armenian Catholic	Male	Female	Both
Аг-Ахмед	Ag-Akhmed (Axaməd)		811		435	376	811
Аг-кенд	Ag-kend (Aghnjadzor)		670		373	297	670
Азадек	Azadek (Azatek)	731			357	394	751
Айназур (Агавнадзор)	Aynazur (Agavnadzor) (Aghavnadzor)	776			452	399	851
Алаклу	Alaklu (Ələkli)	740			395	372	767
Алишар	Alishar (Alışar)		1,125		583	542	1,125
Араб-Енгиджа	Arab-Yengija (Ərəbyengicə)		652		355	297	652
Аргез	Argez (abandoned)		587		323	264	587
Арпа	Arpa (Areni)	545			312	267	579
Ахура	Akhura (Axura)		537		309	228	537
Башкенд	Bashkend (Vernashen)	570			317	277	594
Башнорашен	Bashnorashen (Sharur)	132	687		504	363	867
Вармазиар	Varmaziar (Vərməziyar)	985			516	469	985
Гасан-кенд	Gasan-kend (Shatin)	522			278	245	523
Гергер	Gerger (Herher)	511	1,047		781	781	1,562
Гиндеваз	Gindevaz (Gndevaz)	442	163		338	267	605
Горс	Gors (Hors)		1,136		654	482	1,136
Джуль	Jul (Artavan)		1,214		659	555	1,214
Дуданга	Dudanga (Düdəngə)		922		507	415	922
Енгиджа (Енгиджа-Султан)	Yengija (Yengija-Sultan) (Yengicə)		2,034		1,150	927	2,077
Зейва	Zeyva (Zeyvə)		600		316	284	600
Кабахлу	Kabakhly (Goghtanik)		566		312	254	566
Казулджа	Kazulja (abandoned)		630		357	273	630
Карагасанлу	Karagasanlu (Qarahəsənli)		777		407	372	779
Караклух	Karaklukh (Karaglukh)	786			417	372	789
Кархун	Karkhun (abandoned)				334	267	601
Кешишкенд	Keshishkend (Yeghegnadzor)	1,295			688	613	1,301
Кештаз	Keshtaz (Çəmənli)	355	323		369	309	678
Кийтул (Котур)	Kiytul (Kotur) (Getap)	735			400	371	771
Кишляг-Аббас	Kishlyag-Abbas (Qışlaqabbas)		666		365	301	666
Кущи (Кущи-Биляк)	Kushchi (Kushchi-Bilyak) (Kechut)	631			326	305	631
Кущи-Демурчи	Kushchi-Demurchi (Dəmirçi)		1,838		1,033	805	1,838
Кяримбеклу	Kyarimbeklu (Kərimbəyli)		847		444	403	847
Кюртчулу	Kyurtchulu (Kürçülü)		610		319	291	610
Малишка	Malishka	1,230			673	608	1,281
Мартирос	Martiros	1,022			530	492	1,022
Махмуд-кенд	Makhmud-kend (Mahmudkənd)		609		344	265	609
Махта	Makhta (Maxta)		1,186		643	544	1,187
Муганлу	Muganlu (Muğanlı)		608		331	277	608
Ортакенд	Ortakend (Gladzor)	686			360	343	703
Парчи	Parchi (absorbed by Xanlıqlar)	105	406		263	248	511
Пашалу	Pashalu (Zaritap)	682			338	383	721
Писиан	Pisian (Püsyan)		1,354		743	611	1,354
Саллы	Sally (Salli)		668		363	305	668
Сараглу	Saraglu (abandoned)		504		269	235	504
Сиягут	Siyagut (Siyaqut)		388	281	374	333	707
Тазакенд (Сардарабат)	Tazakend (Sardarabat) (Təzəkənd)		627		349	278	627
Улия Норашен	Uliya Norashen (Oğlanqala)	1,228			660	594	1,254
Халадж	Khalaj (Xələc)		598		303	295	598
Ханлухляр	Khanlukhlyar (Xanlıqlar)	1,023			599	491	1,090
Хачик	Khachik	968			515	453	968
Чарчибоган	Charchibogan (Çərçiboğan)		933		487	446	933
Чива	Chiva		689		355	334	689
Чомахтур	Chomakhtur (Çomaxtur)		1,018		530	488	1,018
Шагриар	Shagriar (Şəhriyar)		1,227		669	558	1,227
Эльпин	Elpin (Yelpin)	708			356	352	708
Эрдапин	Erdapin (Artabuynk)	530			278	252	530
Яйджи	Yayji (Yuxarı Yaycı)		1,846		972	874	1,846
TOTAL		17,938	31,103	281	26,989	23,496	50,485

== Bibliography ==
- Bournoutian, George A. (2018). Armenia and Imperial Decline: The Yerevan Province, 1900–1914. Milton Park, Abingdon, Oxon: Routledge. ISBN 978-1-351-06260-2. OCLC 1037283914.
- Hovannisian, Richard G. (1971). The Republic of Armenia. Vol. 1: The First Year, 1918–1919. Berkeley: University of California Press. ISBN 978-0520019843.
- Кавказский календарь на 1913 год [Caucasian calendar for 1913] (in Russian) (68th ed.). Tiflis: Tipografiya kantselyarii Ye.I.V. na Kavkaze, kazenny dom. 1913. Archived from the original on 19 April 2022.
- Кавказский календарь на 1917 год [Caucasian calendar for 1917] (in Russian) (72nd ed.). Tiflis: Tipografiya kantselyarii Ye.I.V. na Kavkaze, kazenny dom. 1917. Archived from the original on 4 November 2021.
- Tsutsiev, Arthur (2014). Atlas of the Ethno-Political History of the Caucasus (PDF). Translated by Nora Seligman Favorov. New Haven: Yale University Press. ISBN 9780300153088. Archived (PDF) from the original on 17 June 2023.
