= Çəmənli =

Çəmənli may refer to:

- Çəmənli, Agdam, Azerbaijan
- Çəmənli, Barda, Azerbaijan
- Çəmənli, Beylagan (disambiguation)
  - Aşağı Çəmənli, Azerbaijan
  - Yuxarı Çəmənli, Azerbaijan
- Çəmənli, Jalilabad, Azerbaijan
- Çəmənli, Nakhchivan, Azerbaijan

== See also ==
- Çimenli (disambiguation)
