= Muğanlı =

Muğanlı or Mughanly or Mughanli or Mughanlu or Moughanly may refer to:

- Muğanlı, Agdam, Azerbaijan
- Muğanlı, Aghjabadi, Azerbaijan
- Muğanlı, Agstafa, Azerbaijan
- Muğanlı, Barda, Azerbaijan
- Muğanlı, Khojavend, Azerbaijan
- Muğanlı, Kurdamir, Azerbaijan
- Muğanlı, Nakhchivan, Azerbaijan
- Muğanlı, Qubadli, Azerbaijan
- Muğanlı, Shamakhi, Azerbaijan
- Muğanlı, Zangilan (disambiguation)
  - İkinci Muğanlı, Zangilan, Azerbaijan
- Muğanlı, Zaqatala, Azerbaijan

== See also ==
- Muğan (disambiguation)
