= Ali M. Hasanov =

Azerbaijani politician (born 1960)

Ali Hasanov Əli Həsənov
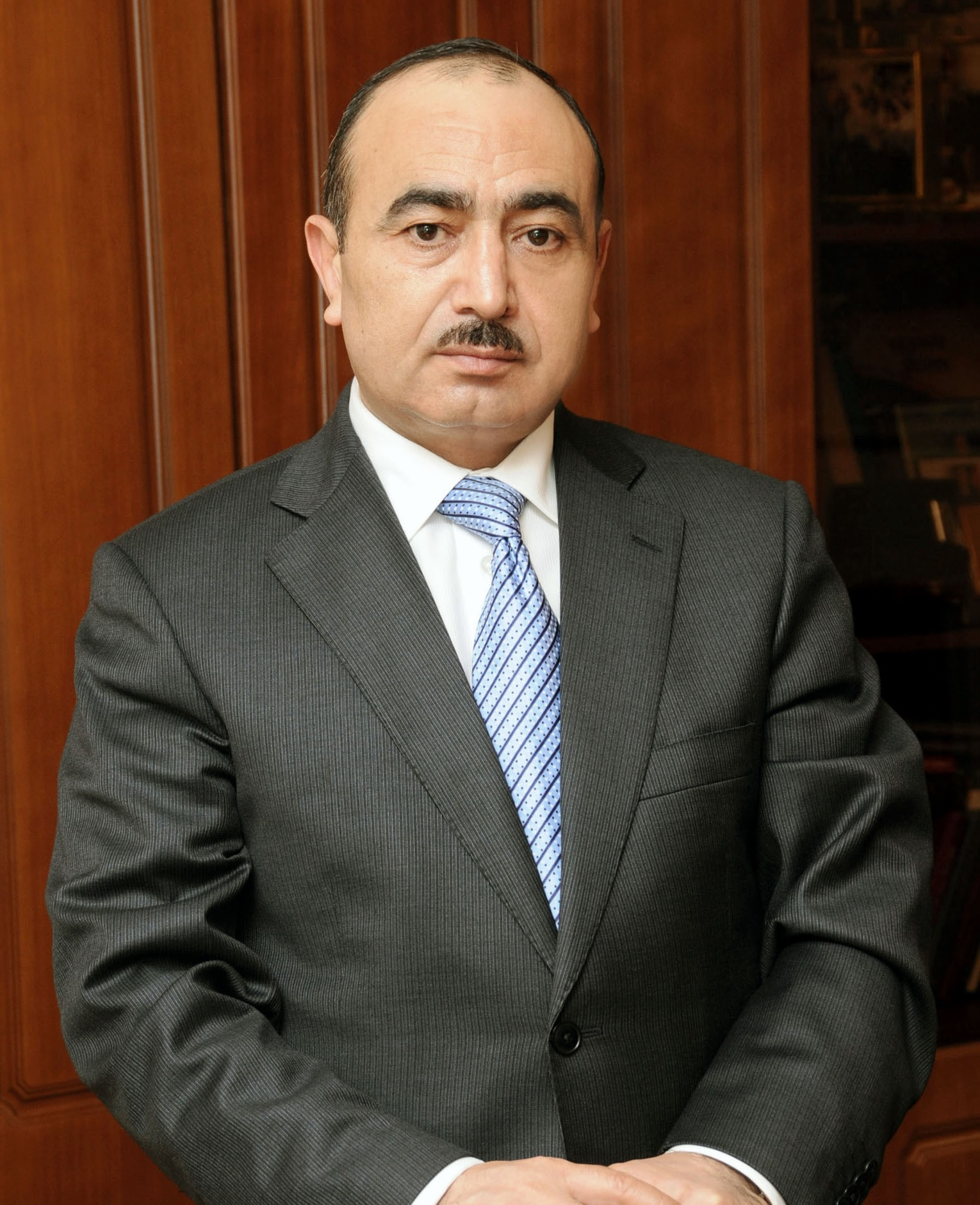

Head of Department on Social Political Issues of the Presidential Administration
- In office September 30, 1995 – November 29, 2019
- President: Heydar Aliyev; Ilham Aliyev
- Succeeded by: Department abolished

Personal details
- Born: March 10, 1960 (age 66) Norashen, Nakhichevan ASSR, Azerbaijan SSR, USSR

Ali Mahammadali oglu Hasanov (Azerbaijani: Əli Məhəmmədəli oğlu Həsənov) (born March 3, 1960) is an Azerbaijani politician and historian, professor, who served as an assistant to the President for Public and Political Issues and Head of Department of Public and Political Issues, Presidential Administration of Azerbaijan Republic.

== Early life ==
Hasanov was born on March 10, 1960, in Tananam village of Sharur Rayon, Nakhchivan ASSR, Azerbaijan. He graduated from Moscow State University and has a PhD in history. From May 19, 1992, until December 2, 1993, Hasanov worked as an inspector at the main office of Nakhchivan State University.

== Political career ==
From February 23, 1994, until September 29, 1995, he was the Director of the Ideology Department of New Azerbaijan Party. Hasanov then worked as the assistant director of the Head of Department on Social Political Issues of the Executive Apparatus from September 30, 1995, until July 9, 1996, and as its head from July 9, 1996, through July 19, 2005. When the official name of the apparatus was changed to Presidential Administration, Hasanov was re-appointed to the same position. He was the Assistant to the President of Azerbaijan for public and political issues. On November 29, 2019, his department was abolished and position dismissed.

Ali Hasanov has been a promoter of the principles of modern Azerbaijani independence and statehood for 25 years and has been internationally recognized as a spokesperson for the Azerbaijani government.

== Awards ==
In March 2010, Hasanov was awarded with Vətənə xidmətə görə (For Service to the Motherland) medal by the President Ilham Aliyev.

== Books ==
- Azerbaijan-USA: from incomprehensible relations to strategic partnership: October 1991-August 1997. Baku: "Azerbaijan University" publishing house, 1997.- 107 p.
- Azerbaijan's foreign policy: European countries and the United States (1991–1996). Baku: Azernashr, 1998.- 331 p.
- Relations of Azerbaijan with the US and European countries: 1991–1996. Baku: Elm, 2000.- 367 p.
- Modern international relations and foreign policy of Azerbaijan. Baku: Azerbaijan, 2005. - 752 p.
- Political systems of Azerbaijan and foreign countries. Baku: Azerbaijan, 2007.- 248 p.
- Geopolitics: theories, methodology, actors, history, characteristics, concepts. Baku: Aypara-3, 2010.- 604 p.
- Geopolitics of Azerbaijan. Baku: Zardabi LTD, 2015.- 1055 p.
- Basics of the national development and security policy of the Republic of Azerbaijan. Baku: Zardabi LTD, 2016.- 662 p.
- Stages of ethnic cleansing and genocide policy against Azerbaijanis. Baku: Zardabi LTD, 2016.- 80 p.
- Geoeconomy of the Caspian-Black Sea Basin and the South Caucasus: Azerbaijan's energy policy. Baku: Zardabi LTD, 2016.- 296 p.
- Khojaly genocide: causes, consequences and recognition in the international world. Baku: Zardabi LTD, 2017.- 464 p.
- Ilham Aliyev – the success of the fifteen-year presidency (2003–2018). Baku: Zardabi LTD, 2018.- 184 p.

== See also ==
- Cabinet of Azerbaijan
- Politics of Azerbaijan
