= Ismayil Garibli =

Azerbaijani lawyer, civil servant and former legislator

- İsmayıl Qəribli

Member of the Supreme Assembly of the Nakhchivan Autonomous Republic
- In office 2020–2024
- Constituency: Yengija Constituency No. 4

Personal details
- Born: 1984 (age 41–42) Axaməd, Ilyich District, Nakhchivan ASSR, Azerbaijan SSR, Soviet Union
- Education: Baku State University; Nakhchivan State University; Academy of Public Administration

Ismayil Javanshir oghlu Garibli (Azerbaijani: İsmayıl Cavanşir oğlu Qəribli; born 1984) is an Azerbaijani lawyer, civil servant and university lecturer. He was a member of the Supreme Assembly of the Nakhchivan Autonomous Republic from 2020 to 2024, representing Yengija Constituency No. 4.

In 2026, the Ministry of Digital Development and Transport of the Nakhchivan Autonomous Republic listed Garibli as head of its Human Resources, Legal, Documents and Appeals Department. He also teaches law at Nakhchivan State University, where he is listed as a senior lecturer in the Department of Private Law.

== Early life and education ==
Garibli was born in 1984 in Axaməd, then part of Ilyich District in the Nakhchivan Autonomous Soviet Socialist Republic. The district is now known as Sharur District.

He completed a bachelor's degree in law at Baku State University in 2005 and a master's degree in state law at Nakhchivan State University in 2009. In 2014, he completed a bachelor's degree in state and municipal administration at the Academy of Public Administration under the President of Azerbaijan.

== Career ==
Garibli began his public-sector career in 2007. He worked briefly as an assistant to the head of the Nakhchivan office of the Central Bank of Azerbaijan before joining the administration of the Supreme Assembly of the Nakhchivan Autonomous Republic. He later served there as an adviser and senior adviser.

In October 2015, Garibli was appointed chairman of the Civil Service Commission under the Chairman of the Supreme Assembly of the Nakhchivan Autonomous Republic. At the time of his appointment, APA reported that he had been serving as a senior adviser in the Supreme Assembly administration.

On 21 December 2020, he was appointed chairman of the State Examination Centre of the Nakhchivan Autonomous Republic. Nakhchivan State University lists his tenure in that position as lasting until 2023.

Garibli headed the Law Division of Nakhchivan State University from 2024 to 2025. In 2026, the Ministry of Digital Development and Transport of the Nakhchivan Autonomous Republic identified him as head of its Human Resources, Legal, Documents and Appeals Department.

== Political career ==
Garibli served in the sixth convocation of the Supreme Assembly of the Nakhchivan Autonomous Republic from 2020 to 2024. The official list of deputies identifies him as the representative for Yengija Constituency No. 4 and as representing the New Azerbaijan Party.

On 1 August 2023, Garibli was elected chairman of the Supreme Assembly's Legal Policy Committee when the composition of the assembly's committees was reorganised. He continued to chair the committee in 2024.

== Academic work ==
Garibli teaches civil procedural law at Nakhchivan State University. The university lists his research interests as civil law, civil procedural law, constitutional law and civil service.

== Honours ==
On 22 June 2019, Garibli was awarded the Medal "For Distinction in Civil Service" by order of the President of Azerbaijan.
