= Stansiya Daşarx =

- Municipality
- Location within Azerbaijan
- Coordinates: 39°29′24″N 45°01′12″E
- Country: Azerbaijan
- Autonomous republic: Nakhchivan
- District: Sharur

Population
  - Total: 407
- Time zone: UTC+4 (AZT)

Stansiya Daşarx (also, Daşarx) is a village and municipality in the Sharur District of Nakhchivan, Azerbaijan. It has a population of 407.

== See also ==
- Aşağı Daşarx
- Yuxarı Daşarx
