= Javid Ismayil =

Azerbaijani economist and lawyer (born 1972)

- İsmayıl Cavid Əjdər oğlu
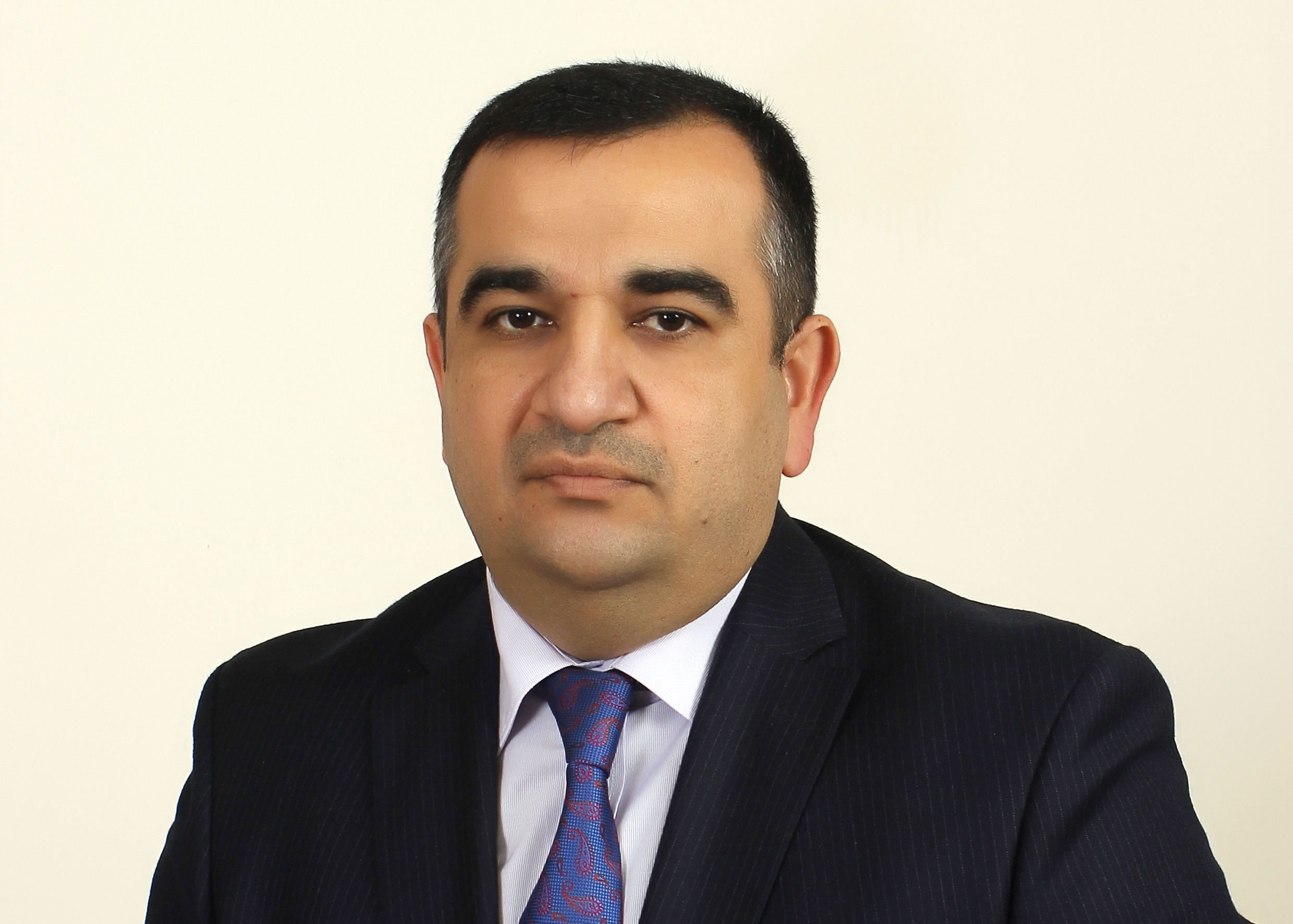
- Born: 1 June 1972 (age 54); Chomakhtur, Sherur raion, Nakhchivan ASSR, Azerbaijan SSR, USSR
- Education: Nakhchivan State University
- Known for: Doctor of Philosophy in Economics

Javid Ismayil (full name Javid Ajdar Ismayil; born June 1, 1972) is an Azerbaijani economist and lawyer. He is a Doctor of Philosophy in Economics, founder of “International Studies –International Journal”, and Deputy Chairman of Public Union “Turan Research Centre”.

== Life ==
Javid Ismayil was born on June 1, 1972, in Chomakhtur village of Sharur region of Nakhchivan Autonomous Soviet Socialist Republic. He left high school in 1988 and graduated from the Faculty of Economics of Nakhchivan State University in 1995 with honors. In 2014, he finished the Faculty of Law in NSU, and in 2018 received his third higher education diploma in International Relations.

Javid Ismayil joined the struggle of the Azerbaijani people against the USSR empire and the national liberation movement since he was a teenager and voluntarily took an active part in the battles against the Armenian bandits who tried to invade Nakhchivan.

Javid, a teenager who was an active participant in 1989 in the border movement and the destruction of the border of the USSR, on January 7, 1991, managed to destroy the strategic area facilities with a small number of his comrades-in-arms, although the area, that was considered the most important border area, currently located on the Azerbaijani-Turkish border, belonged to Azerbaijan, but the border administration was in former Armenian SSR and, Moscow insisted on mobilizing all its forces to ensure the inviolability of the border engineering.

In general, being a teenager Javid Ismayil was interrogated three times by the USSR KGB during the national liberation movement, he was also investigated for his activity in opening the border with Turkey. The incident of the destruction of the barbed wire of the empire by the people was enlightened in the several copies of the all-Union newspaper published in Moscow "Moskovskiye Novosti".

He is a military serviceman, married and has three children.

Javid Ismayil is the son of professor Ajdar Ismailov, the grandson of Tagi Ismailov who was an independent, partisan, one of the commanders of the Red Battalion and fought against the Armenian Dashnaks mainly in the direction of Sharur-Daralayaz.

== Scientific activity ==
Javid Ismayil has served in the Government Agency with the status of law enforcement since 1996, at the same time his great interest for science from his school days led him to develop in this direction. Thus, in 1997-2000 he was a postgraduate student of the Institute of Economics of ANAS. In 2000 he defended his dissertation on “Impact of the tax system on the formation and development of entrepreneurship in Azerbaijani industry” and received a doctorate degree of philosophy in Economics.

As his second job, he taught Economics and Law at a number of universities as a Doctor of Philosophy in Economics.

Javid Ismayil is the founder of an independent international scientific journal “Economic Research –International Journal”, provided ISSN 2522-9451- International Standard Serial Number for periodicals, which the center is located in Paris, France. Besides, Javid Ismayil is known in the media mainly for his autographs, publicist writings, stories and poems.

== Social activities ==
At the same time, Javid Ismayil is closely and actively involved in the public life of Azerbaijan. He is one of the founders and deputy chairman of the public union Turan Research Center, which was established to promote the rich culture and ancient history of the Turkic peoples and to develop the cultural ties between them, to support the conduct of historical research, as well as to carry out enlightenment work in the field of protection of national-spiritual and historical values of the Azerbaijani people and to promote the strengthening of solidarity and historical ties between the Turkic peoples.

== Scientific works ==
1. "Small economy: problems, tasks", Baku, 1997.
2. "The impact of the tax system on the formation and development of entrepreneurship in Azerbaijan", Baku, "Elm", 1997. - 144 s.
3. “Economic problems of formation and development of entrepreneurship in Azerbaijan", Baku, 1998.
4. "Foreign inverstent in the Azerbaijani economy", Baku, 1999.
5. "Theoretical bases of formation of the tax mechanism", Baku, 1999.
6. “Legal regulation of economic development”, Baku, 2000.
7. “Inverstment and legal regulation”, Baku, 2011.
8. "Innovation of entrepreneurship and its role in the development of the tax system", Baku, 2015.
9. "Formation of entrepreneurial activity and tax system in Azerbaijan", Baku, 2015.
10. "Factors influencing the formation and development of entrepreneurship ", Baku, 2015.
11. "The role of tax policy in the competitiveness of business entities", Baku, 2016.
12. "Entrepreneurship and the establishment of an effective national tax system" Baku, 2016.

== Articles and interviews ==
1. "Nuru paşanın ödül verdiyi Şərurlu partizan Tağı". Newspaper "İki Sahil", №68 (6099), page 11-12, 22.04.2014
2. “Tarih kolay yazılmıyor” Turkishnews, Turkey, 12.01.2018. "Tarih kolay yazılmıyor.
3. “History is not easy to write– AZERBAIJAN!” (an interview) – Newspaper" Azad Azerbaijan", page 5 № 10 (3211) 20.01.2018
4. “Как народ армяне никогда не обладели ни этноэпонимами, ни этноисторией“ – Caspian, № 27(923) page 10. 10.10.2018
5. “Our country has a special respect among the world powers for its economic power“ – Newspaper “ Olaylar” - № 133(4491) page 15. 26.07.2018
6. “Has the nation that calls itself “hay” had an ethno-history and ethno-writing in the history of the world?” Newspapar "Xalq qazeti" – № 134 (28810) page 12. 15.06.2018
7. “You cannot “joke” with the flag!" – Newspaper "Azad Azerbaijan". № 173 (3374) page 3 04.12.2018
8. "24 Dekabr, De-Turkified Turkish land – İREVAN!" – ONN Media 23.12.2018
9. "24 dekabr, Türksüzleştirilen Türk toprakları – ERİVAN!" Turkishnews, Turkey 02.01. 2019 December, Türksüzleştirilen Türk toprakları – ERİVAN!
10. “Do we introduce our national identity to our children by means of our fairy tales? “ Newspaper “Olaylar” № 6 (4596) page 10. 10.01.2019
11. “He who betrays ones will surely betray again. Newspaper “Olaylar” № 15 (4605) page 2. 23.01.2019
12. “Today it is impossible to imagine the largest economic projects in the world without Azerbaijan”. Newspaper “Olaylar”. №19 (4609) page 15. 29.01.2019. Interview.
13. “Saw stone”. Newspaper “Azad Azerbaijan”, №103 (3492), page 2. 27.08.2019
14. “The official’s love for the tent before the holiday”. Azad Azerbaijan, page.3, 31.12.2019
15. “Lovers of Darkness”. Newspapaer “Olaylar”. №4 (4760), səh.10. 16-17.01.2020
16. “The war is not only in the trenches...”, Newspapaer “Səs", 18.02.2020
17. “Savaş Sadece Siperde Değil” Asasmedia, Turkey. 22.02.2020 Sadece Siperde Değil
18. “The homeland rises on the shoulders of the MARTYR” - ONN Media, 08.03.2020
19. “Congratulation on your liberation, Erzurum!”, Newspaper “Olaylar”, 12.03.2020
20. “Why do you pour the blessings on those who do don’t serve the Motherland?” Newspaper “Olaylar”, 23.03.2020.
21. “We will be strong and invincible together” Newspaper “Olaylar”, 18.04.2020
