= Isa Mammadov =

Azerbaijani statesman

Isa Mammadov İsa Məmmədov

Secretary of the Central Committee of the Communist Party of Azerbaijan
- In office January 1981 – 1987

The First Secretary of the Lankaran City Committee of the Communist Party of Azerbaijan
- In office 1970 – January 1981
- Preceded by: Mammad Babayev
- Succeeded by: Dilruba Jamalova

Minister of Culture of Nakhchivan ASSR
- In office 1965–1970
- Succeeded by: Huseyn Ibrahimov

Personal details
- Born: July 11, 1926 Sharur District, Nakhichevan ASSR, Azerbaijan SSR, Soviet Union
- Died: August 10, 2007 (aged 81) Baku, Azerbaijan
- Party: CPSU
- Education: Azerbaijan State Pedagogical University
- Awards: Order of Lenin Order of the Red Banner of Labour Honored Teacher of the Azerbaijan SSR

Isa Ali oghlu Mammadov (Azerbaijani: İsa Əli oğlu Məmmədov, July 11, 1926 – August 10, 2007) was an Azerbaijani statesman, secretary of the Central Committee of the Communist Party of Azerbaijan (1981–1987), First Secretary of the Lankaran City Committee (1970–1981), Minister of Culture of the Nakhichevan ASSR (1965–1970), Hero of Socialist Labour (1976), Honored Teacher of the Azerbaijan SSR (1964), doctor of psychological sciences (2006).

== Biography ==
Isa Mammadov was born in Aralig village, Sharur District, Nakhichevan ASSR. After graduating from the Sharur district central secondary school in 1942, he studied at the Moscow Higher Komsomol School in 1945–1947, and received higher education at the Azerbaijan Pedagogical Institute in 1947–1950. In 1972–1977, Isa Mammadov attended the Moscow Higher Party School.

Isa Mammadov, who started his career in 1943–1944 at the secondary school in Sharur district, was the first secretary of the Sharur district Komsomol committee in 1944–1945, in 1947-1953 he was the secretary and then the first secretary of the Nakhichevan regional Komsomol committee, in 1953-1961 he was the head of the Nakhichevan city and district education departments, in 1961-1965 he was the director of the Nakhichevan city boarding school, in 1965-1970 he served as the Minister of Culture of the Nakhichevan ASSR, the first secretary of the Lankaran city party committee in 1970–1981, the secretary of the Central Committee of the Communist Party of Azerbaijan in 1981–1987, and the director of the Baku Pedagogical Personnel Training and Retraining Institute from 1988 until the end of his life.

Isa Mammadov defended his candidate's theses in 1997 and his doctoral theses in 2006. He worked effectively in the organization of psychological services in general education schools and in the field of training practical psychologists.

In 1976, he was awarded the title of Hero of Socialist Labour.

Isa Ali oghlu Mammadov died in Baku at the age of 81.

== Awards ==
- Hero of Socialist Labour — 1976
- Personal Pension of the President of the Republic of Azerbaijan — October 2, 2002
