= Vugar Abbasov =

Azerbaijani politician (born 1974)

Vugar Abbasov Member of the Supreme Assembly of Nakhchivan

Member of the [[Nakhchivan Autonomous Republic Parliament]] for Nakhchivan
- Incumbent
- Assumed office 9 February 2020
- Preceded by: Maharram Abbasov

Personal details
- Born: 12 April 1974 (age 52) Nakhchivan, Azerbaijan SSR
- Party: New Azerbaijan Party
- Education: Nakhchivan State University
- Profession: School of Economic Sciences

Vugar Abbasov (Azerbaijani: Vüqar Abbasov Zakir oğlu; born 12 April 1974) is a Member of the Supreme Assembly of Nakhchivan (VI convocation), Chairman of the Football Federation of the Nakhchivan Autonomous Republic, chairman of the management board of the Confederation of Entrepreneurs of the Nakhchivan Autonomous Republic, President of Cahan Holding.

== Life ==
Vugar Zakir oglu Abbasov was born on April 12, 1974, in the city of Nakhchivan. He started his first education in 1981 at secondary school number 7 in Nakhchivan city and graduated from it in 1991 with a red certificate. In the same year, he was admitted to the Faculty of Economics of Nakhchivan State University and graduated with honors in 1996. During the years 1998–2001, he was awarded with a red diploma at the Faculty of Law and Economics of Nakhchivan State University. Later, in 2001–2006, he was awarded the Red Diploma of the Law Department of the university. In 2008, he became a doctoral student of ANAS Institute of Economics, and more than 10 scientific works were published in foreign countries. In 2016, he defended his scientific work on the Development of Entrepreneurship in the Region and received the scientific title of Doctor of Philosophy in Economic Sciences. He is the founder and head of Cahan Holding since 1995.

== Political activity ==
In February 2020, he was elected a deputy of the Nakhchivan Supreme Assembly as a candidate of the New Azerbaijan Party. As a result of voting, Vugar Abbasov was elected a deputy, gaining 3681 votes or 80.8 percent of the votes from his constituency On January 18, 2022, at the reporting and election meeting of the Football Federation of the Nakhchivan Autonomous Republic, Vugar Abbasov was elected chairman of the federation. He replaced the former Minister of Youth and Sports of the Nakhchivan Autonomous Republic Azad Jabbarov.
