= Tagi Ismailov =

Personal details
- Born: 1887 Chomakhtur, Sharur District, Nakhchivan, Russian Empire
- Died: 1958 (aged 70–71) Sharur District, Nakhchivan, Azerbaijan SSR, USSR
- Children: Hasan, Humay, Ajdar, Ibrahim
- Occupation: Politician, revolutionary

Tagi Meshadi Mahmoud oglu Ismailov (Azerbaijani: Tağı Məşədi Mahmud oğlu İsmayılov; 1887 – 1958) – liberalist, partisan, one of the commanders of “Red Battalion”.

== Biography ==
Tagi Ismailov was born in Sherur region Chomakhtur village of Nakhchivan, in 1887. His father, Meshadi Mahmoud, having education of foremost teachers of that period, known as “zagranichniy” (it means neat and modern in Russian) Mahmoud among people, for his modern clothes and thoughts, sent younger Tagi not to molla school but Russian-Tatar (Turk) school and he studied there.

== Brave commander ==
The fighter for the liberty of Azerbaijan, was exiled to Northern Caucasus for his brave opinions from his first youth. There, he was charged to “desyatnik”, assistant engineer in Armavi railway construction. (Given photo in the page belongs to that period.)

He participated in the construction of Nakhchivan-Irevan railway, in 1902. He was the founder of “Shahtakhti labourer, peasant and soldier soviet” (1917) and the organizer of the fighting groups against Dashnaks raiding to Sherur region in 1918–1919. He had propagandized among the soldiers, while working on the construction of Shahtakhti-Maku-Bayazid railway, which was aimed to build for transporting Russian armed forces and machines. He had fought among the volunteer fighters group consisting of fellow villagers in the Turkish military units which repelled the Armenian bandits out of Sherur's villages.

He was awarded with the weapon called “Turkish Caliber” and the silver dagger decorated with gems, for his bravery in performing the last impact against Dashnak army below Khok (Xok in native) village. The partisan group of which he was the commander especially distinguished in the fight against Dashnak bandit group attacking to Sherur county from Dereleyez valley on 28 June, in 1920 and Tagi Ismailov performed great valor in these fights.

He was one of the commanders of Abbasgulu bey Shadlinski's “Red Battalion”, in 1920–1922.

== Civil life of partizan commander ==
He had been one of the leaders and organizers of bank, cooperation and grain stocking enterprises group (kombinat) structures in Soviet period.

He was elected delegate to the first assembly of Azerbaijan agriculture cooperation unity, held in 1927 and the USSR agriculture bank, loan officers’ 3rd all-union assembly, held in Moscow in January 1929.

He was awarded with the badges of "Excellent stocker", "Excellent worker of rye and grain industry" and "Excellent founder of USSR stocking" by the decision of USSR People's Stocking Commissariat, in January 1939.

Tagi Ismailov was rewarded firstly with USSR People's Stocking Commissariat's badge of "Excellent stocker" on 22 February 1943 for his devoted work at the back front and keeping the grain stocks in his disposal safe and without loss, in the years of Great Patriotic War (much of grain taken from the Nazis in Southern Caucasus were kept at Norashen grain stock). Then he was rewarded with the medal of "For the valiant labor in The Patriotic War, 1941-1945" by the 24 June 1946 dated decree of The Presidium of USSR Supreme Soviet. For the conscientious serving, Tagi Ismailov's labor was honored by the "Medal of Honor."

He died in 1958.

== See also ==
- Ajdar Ismailov (his son)
- Javid Ismayil
