= Babəki =

- Municipality
- Location within Azerbaijan
- Coordinates: 39°30′N 44°58′E
- Country: Azerbaijan
- Autonomous republic: Nakhchivan
- District: Sharur

Population (2005)
  - Total: 113
- Time zone: UTC+4 (AZT)

Babəki (also, Babaki and Babeki) is a village and the least populous municipality in the Sharur District of Nakhchivan Autonomous Republic, Azerbaijan. It is located 8 km in the south-east from the district center, on the valley of the Araz River, on the plain. Its population is busy with grain-growing, horticulture, vegetable-growing, foddering and animal husbandry. There are secondary school, club and a medical center in the village. It has a population of 113.

== Etymology ==
The village of Babəki was established in the middle of the 20th century by a group of young families which were moved out from the neighboring village of Çərçiboğan (Carchibogan) and settled in here. The toponym reflects in itself, the name of the national hero Babek. The name means "belonging to Babek, supporters of Babek".
