= Axura nekropolises =

Ancient necropolis in Azerbaijan

Axura Necropolises
- Location: Sharur district, Azerbaijan

Axura necropolises is an archeological site dating to the end of the Iron Age located at the eastern end of the village of Axura in Sharur district in Azerbaijan.

== Axura nekropolis I ==
The necropolis is located at the eastern end of the village of Axura, near the area called "Yuxarı bulaq", "Teymur's garden". Due to its location on the right bank of the Axurachay, part of the necropolis was washed away by floodwaters. The area of the surviving part is 150 x 100 meters. The headstones are made of giant stones and have a conical shape. A hole with a diameter of 20 x 25 cm was opened in the gradually reduced part. Apparently, a rope was tied to the stones from this part and they were brought to the cemetery by dragging. Two earthen graves were excavated in the necropolis. The graves are 1.5 meters deep and 1.85 m long. A male skeleton was found in both of them. No material and cultural samples were found in the graves. The necropolis belongs to the III-VIII centuries.

== Axura nekropolis II ==
The necropolis I is located on a low hill 1 km east of the Axura necropolis, on the right bank of the Axurachay, in the area called "Yuxarı bulaq", "Əncirlik", near the river bed. The surviving area is 50 x 80 m. As a result of archeological excavations in the necropolis, two graves were studied and it was determined that the necropolis consists of earthen graves. A search of the Axura II necropolis revealed a number of personal items. The earthenware consists of small jug fragments. The necropolis was discovered on the basis of materials discovered there. III, can be attributed to the first centuries AD.

== Axura nekropolis III ==
It is located near the village of Axura. The graves were excavated in a west-east direction. Some tombs had chest-shaped chest stones and ram stones. Books written in the Arabic alphabet have fallen apart and become unreadable. The necropolis dates back to the 14th-18th centuries.
