= Daşarx, Nakhchivan =

'Daşarx, Nakhchivan may refer to:

- Aşağı Daşarx
- Yuxarı Daşarx
