= Vasif Talibov =

Azerbaijani politician (born 1960)

- Vasif Talıbov
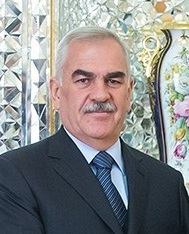
- Talibov in 2017

Chairman of the Supreme Assembly of the Nakhchivan Autonomous Republic
- In office 16 December 1995 – 21 December 2022
- Preceded by: Namig Hasanov
- Succeeded by: Azer Zeynalov (acting)
- In office 3 July 1993 – 4 April 1994
- Preceded by: Heydar Aliyev
- Succeeded by: Namig Hasanov

Personal details
- Born: 14 January 1960 (age 66) Aşağı Aralıq, Norashen District, Nakhichevan ASSR, Azerbaijan SSR, USSR
- Party: New Azerbaijan Party
- Spouse: Sevil Sultanova
- Children: 3
- Education: Nakhchivan State University, Baku State University

Vasif Talibov (Note: also transliterated as Talybov.) (Azerbaijani: Vasif Yusif oğlu Talıbov; born 14 January 1960) is an Azerbaijani politician. Described as authoritarian, he was the de facto ruler of Nakhchivan for 27 years, from 1995 until his resignation in December 2022. Azerbaijani dictator Heydar Aliyev appointed Talibov to govern Nakchivan. Under Talibov's rule, the isolated territory of Nakchivan was notorious for its secrecy and brutal state violence.

He was the former chairman of the Supreme Assembly of the Nakhchivan Autonomous Republic, a deputy of the Milli Majlis of the Republic of Azerbaijan, and a member of the Board of Directors of the New Azerbaijan Party.

The Talibov family enriched themselves during their rule over Nakchivan. Their assets included Nakhchivan Bank, which was 100% owned by family members until 2022. The 2022 Suisse secrets leaks revealed that the Talibov family has enriched itself from questionable sources and maintained an elaborate, secretive offshore network of wealth.

== Early life and career ==
Talibov graduated from the faculty of history at Nakhchivan State Pedagogical University (now Nakhchivan State University) in 1981 and the faculty of law at Baku State University in 1998. In addition to his native Azerbaijani, Talibov speaks Russian, Turkish, and some English.

Talibov's career began in 1981, with him working as a teacher in the village of Damirchi, in the Sharur District. Starting 1982, he worked as the instructor of personnel and then as the head of the special department in the knitted-goods factory of Nakhchivan.

== Career ==
Talibov rose to power due to his marriage to Sevil Sultanova, who was related to President of Azerbaijan Heydar Aliyev. Aliyev made Talibov his head assistant in 1990, amid the dissolution of the Soviet Union, and Aliyev became president of the newly independent Azerbaijan in 1993. From September 1991 to April 1994, Talibov was chief assistant of the Chairman of the Supreme Assembly of Nakhchivan.

From April 1994 to December 1995, he was the first deputy of the prime minister of the Nakhchivan Autonomous Republic on foreign economic relations. He supported Aliyev after his return from Moscow to Nakhchivan to seize power and participated in the establishment of the New Azerbaijan Party. He became a member of the Political Council and Presidium of the NAP, as well as head of the Nakhchivan organization of the NAP since 8 April 1995.

Talibov has been continually elected as deputy of the Supreme Assembly of Nakhchivan since 1995 and has also been elected as chairman of the Supreme Assembly following each election to the Supreme Assembly of Nakhchivan.

On 21 December 2022, Talibov resigned from his position, officially because of health issues; the Supreme Assembly swifltly accepted his resignation and appointed Azer Zeynalov as acting chairman in his place. Eurasianet reported rumorts that the resignation was part of an attempt by Azerbaijani President Ilham Aliyev to increase its control on the region.

== Personal life ==
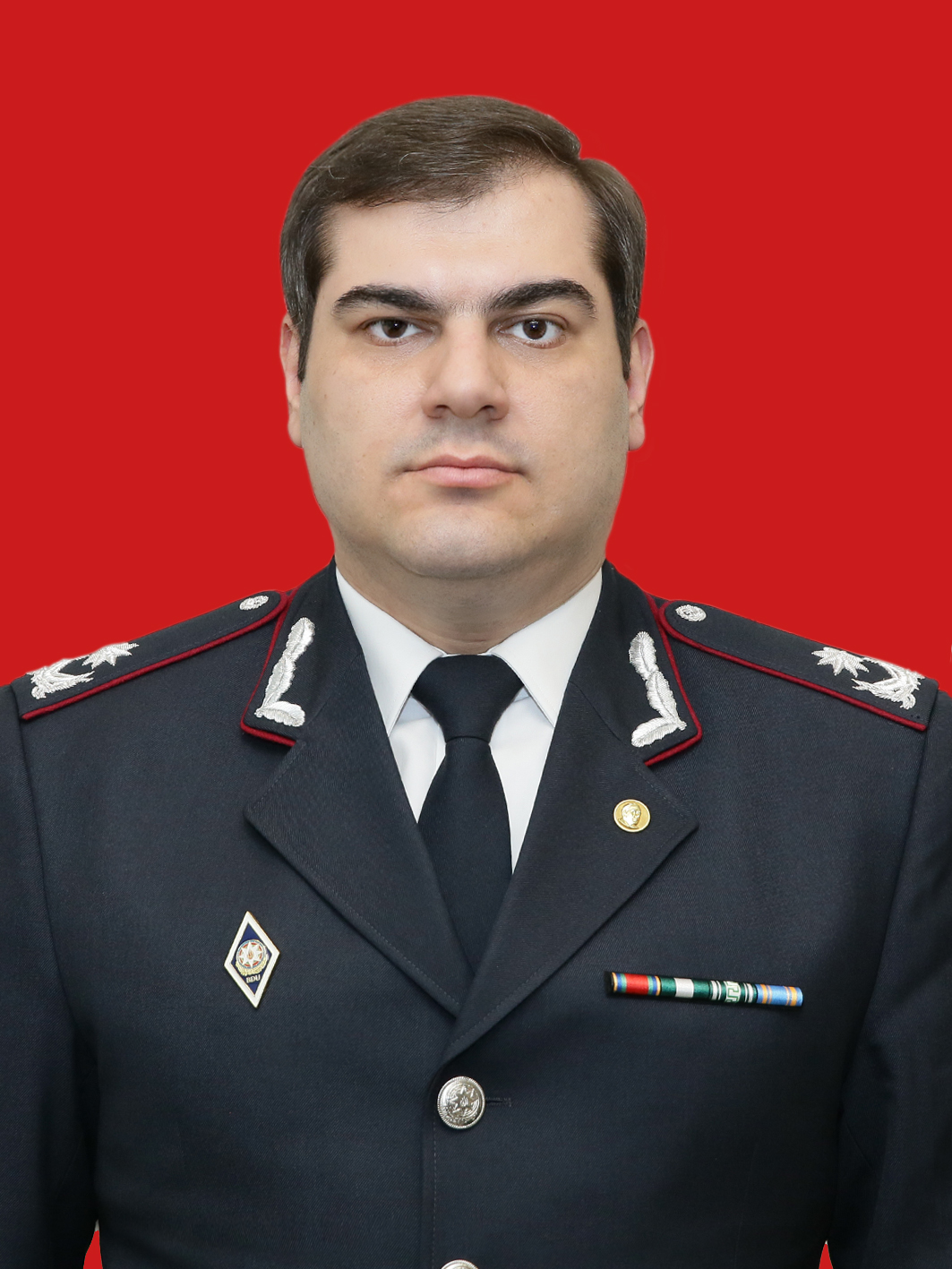
Rza Talıbov in 2018

Talibov is married to Sevil Sultanova who was related to Heydar Aliyev. They have two sons, Rza Talibov and Seymur Talibov, and a daughter, Baharkhanim Talibova. Rza is a senior immigration official in Baku, but owns real estate valued in millions of dollars. Rza and Seymur monopolized businesses in Nakchivan.

While Vasif Talibov's official salary is $26,000 per year, the 2022 Suisse secrets leaks revealed that the Talibov family has enriched itself from questionable sources and maintained an elaborate secretive offshore network of wealth. Talibov's children have acquired properties worth an estimated $63 million.

== Controversies ==
Talibov's governorship is controversial both within Nakhchivan and abroad. Critics allege that the autonomous Azerbaijani region has fostered a culture of impunity among its security forces, which have been known to use excessive force against opponents of the ruling regime. He is often seen as a member of the ruling oligarchy centred on the Aliyev family and, according to Freedom House, is said to run the region as his "personal fiefdom".

During his rule, thousands of citizens have left the region for work abroad and seeking better conditions of life.

== Awards ==
- Medal of Glory in 2010 by President Aliyev.
- Sharaf Order in 2020 by President Aliyev.

== Notes ==
Political offices
Preceded by Heydar Aliyev	Parliamentary Chairman of Nakhchivan; 1995–2022	Succeeded by Azer Zeynalov (acting)
