= Muğanlı, Agdam =

Mungali could refer to one of the following places in the Aghdam District of Azerbaijain:

- Muğanlı (Şıxbabalı), Agdam
- Muğanlı (Bağbanlar), Agdam
