= Oğuzkənd =

- Municipality
- Location within Azerbaijan
- Coordinates: 39°31′19″N 45°02′39″E
- Country: Azerbaijan
- Autonomous republic: Nakhchivan
- District: Sharur

Population (2005)
  - Total: 722
- Time zone: UTC+4 (AZT)

Oğuzkənd (also, Oghuzkand and Oguz-kend; until 2003, Sovxoz) is a municipality and village in the Sharur District of Nakhchivan, Azerbaijan. It is located 16 km away from the district center. Its population is busy with foddering and animal husbandry. There are secondary school, club and a medical center in the village. It has a population of 722.

== Etymology ==
Its former name was Sovxoz (Sovkhoz). The name of Sovxoz was established during the Soviet period. Sovkhoz is a shortened version of the phrase of "Soviet farm". The name of the Oguzkənd village is related with the name of the Oghuz Turks and means "the village of Oghuzs".
