= Xanlıqlar =

Xanlıqlar may refer to:

- Xanlıqlar, Nakhchivan, Azerbaijan
- Xanlıqlar, Qazakh, Azerbaijan
