= Ibrahim Safi =

Ibrahim Safi (born Rahman Gafar oglu Shafiyev; 1898–1983) was an Azerbaijani painter. He was born in Nakhchivan, Azerbaijan. He first studied at the Cəlilkənd school before moving to Russia to study at the Erivan Teachers' Seminary (1914–1916). He showed artistic talent from a young age, producing his first paintings, "Araz Fishermen" and "Portrait of My Mother," at age 12.

In 1916, he officially began his studies in art at the Moscow School of Painting, Sculpture and Architecture. He later graduated from the Moscow Fine Arts Academy. During the First World War, he moved to Istanbul and became a Turkish citizen. After moving to Türkiye in 1917, he enlisted in the Turkish army during the Turkish War of Independence.

Afterward, he worked at the Istanbul Tobacco Factory while also pursuing art. In 1920, he won the European Artists' Competition in Turkey. He graduated from the School of Fine Arts (now called the Mimar Sinan Fine Arts University), a prominent institution for Turkish Impressionism, where Ibrahim Calli, the forefather of Turkish Impressionism and leader of the 1914 generation, was a professor.

He is well known as an impressionist/realist. His surname is taken from the Safi tribe, which played an important role in organizing the Safavid dynasty at the beginning of the 16th century.
