= Jamil Hasanli =

Azerbaijani historian, author and politician (1952)

- Cəmil Həsənli
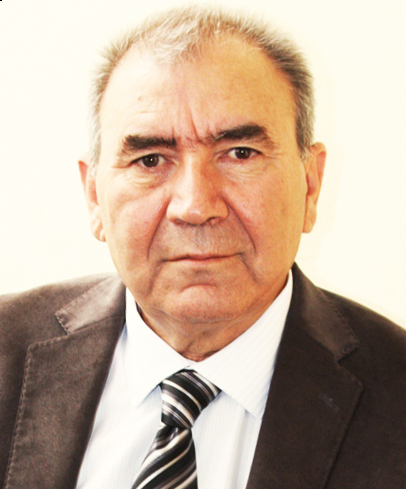
- Hasanli in 2014
- Born: 15 January 1952 (age 74); Aghalykend, Bilasuvar District, Azerbaijan SSR, Soviet Union (now Azerbaijan)
- Education: Baku State University; Southern Illinois University
- Scientific career
- Fields: History of Azerbaijan; Specifically its Karabakh and Nakhchivan regions and the Cold War
- Workplaces: Azerbaijan National Academy of Sciences

Jamil Poladkhan oghlu Hasanli (Azerbaijani: Cəmil Poladxan oğlu Həsənli) (born 15 January 1952) is an Azerbaijani historian, author and politician. He served as a professor at Baku State University in 1993–2011 and as a professor at Khazar University in 2011–2013. He was an advisor to the President of Azerbaijan in 1993 and served two terms in the Parliament of Azerbaijan between 2000 and 2010. He was the main opposition candidate in the 2013 Azerbaijani presidential election where he came in second with 5.53% of votes. He has been the leader of National Council of Democratic Forces of Azerbaijan since 2013.

== Biography ==
=== Early years and development ===
Jamil Hasanli was born on January 15, 1952, in Aghalykend, Bilasuvar District, Azerbaijan SSR. After finishing secondary school in Alar, Jalilabad, he entered Azerbaijan State University's History program in 1970. After completing university, he worked in Təzəkənd village, Jalilabad District as a teacher of history. In 1976–1977 he was a lecturer in the Baku branch of the Central Lenin Museum. In 1977, he entered doctoral courses at Baku State University and studied the modern histories of countries of Europe and the Americas. Since 1980, he has worked there as a docent and professor. In 1984, he defended his PhD. dissertation on Soviet-American relations. In 1990, he became a docent, and in 1992 defended his dissertation, "Azerbaijan Republic in the system of international relations".

=== Career ===
From 1992 to 1994, he was dean of the New and Modern History of Europe and Americas department. At present, he is the professor in the department. In 1993, from April until September, he was an advisor to the President of Azerbaijan. From 1994 to 2004, he was a member of the President's Expert Council of High Accreditation Commission of Azerbaijan.

He graduated with a History degree from Baku State University in 1975. In 1984, he finished his PhD, and he served as a professor at BSU in 1993-2011 and a professor at Khazar University in 2011-2013. He was an advisor to the President of Azerbaijan in 1993 and served two terms as a Member of the Parliament of Azerbaijan in 2000-2010. Professor Hasanli was a presidential candidate for the National Council of Democratic Forces of Azerbaijan in October 2013. He was a History and Public Policy Scholar of the Woodrow Wilson International Center in 2011.

He is the author of 28 monographs and books and more than 100 articles, printed in Azerbaijan, Russia, the USA, Turkey, Iran and other countries. His books have been published in Azerbaijan, Russia, the USA, Turkey, Iran and other countries. Two of his monographs were published in the Harvard Cold War Studies Book Series (At the dawn of the Cold War: : The Soviet -American Crisis over Iranian Azerbaijan, 1941-1946. Rowman and Littlefield Publishers, 2006; Stalin and the Turkish Crisis of the Cold War, 1945-1953. Lexington Books, 2011). His books The Khrushchev Thaw and National Question in Azerbaijan, 1954-1959 (Moscow, 2009), Foreign Policy of Azerbaijan in the Soviet Period, 1920-1939 (Baku, 2012 and Moscow, 2013) and Alimardan bey Topchibashov: Life for the Idea, 1863-1934 (Baku, 2013 and Moscow, 2014) draw heavily on information from newly opened archives.

Hasanli’s book, Foreign Policy of the Republic of Azerbaijan, 1918-1920: The Difficult Road to Western Integration, (M.E. Sharpe, New York, 2014) narrates the tumultuous path of the first Azerbaijan Republic toward winning international recognition. Based on the archived documents of several countries, the author reconstructs a vivid image of the Azerbaijani political elite’s quest for nationhood after the collapse of the Russian colonial system. With a particular focus on the liberation of Baku from Bolshevik factions, relations with regional neighbors, and the arduous road to recognition of Azerbaijan’s independence by the Paris Peace Conference, the author provides valuable insights into the history of the South Caucasus region and the dynamics of the post-World War I era.

== Selected academic works ==
=== Books ===
==== In Azerbaijan ====
- Black Shadows on the “White Spots”. Soviet totalitarianism in Azerbaijan in the 1920s and 1930s. Baku, 1991.
- The Republic of Azerbaijan in the System of International Relations in 1918-20. Baku, 1993.
- South Azerbaijan: Between Tehran, Baku, Moscow (1939–45). Baku, 1998.
- History. From The Past to the Future. Baku, 1998.
- The Place, where The Cold War started: Southern Azerbaijan, 1945-1946. Baku, 1999.
- Soviet, American and British Confrontation in South Azerbaijan, 1941-46. Baku, 2001.
- USSR-Turkey: The Training Ground of the Cold War. Baku, 2005 (also in Russian).
- National Question in Azerbaijan: Political Leadership and Intelligentsia. 1954-1959. Baku, 2008.
- The Foreign Policy of the Azerbaijan Democratic Republic (1918-1920). Baku, 2009.
- Foreign Policy of Azerbaijan in the Soviet Period. 1920-1939. Baku, Adiloghlu Publisher, 2012.
- History of the historical personality: Ali Mardan bey Topchibashov. Azerbaijan Diplomatic Academy, Baku, 2013.
- Soviet liberalism in Azerbaijan: Power. Intelligentsias. People. (1959-1969). Baku, Ganun, 2019
- South Azerbaijan: at the crossroads of history (1939-1945). Baku: Qanun, 2023.
- On the test of time. Memories. Baku, 2023.
- Time tested us too. Memories. Baku, 2024.
- Tabriz-1946: Victory and tragedy of the national government. Baku, Qanun, 2024.

==== In Turkish ====
- The Republic of Azerbaijan. From Turkish Aid to the Russian Invasion. 1918-20. Ankara, 1998.
- The First Confrontation of the Cold War: Iranian Azerbaijan. Istanbul, 2005.
- From Neutralities to Cold War: Turkish – Soviet Relations, 1939-1953, Ankara, Bilgi Yayınevi, 2011.
- Alimardan bey Topçubaşı: period and struggle. Türk Tarih Kurumu Yayınları, Ankara, 2022
- In The Test of Time:The Soviet Years Through the Eyes of a Turkish Child. Ankara Mİ YAYINLARI, 2024.

==== In Russian ====
- South Azerbaijan: The Beginning of The Cold War. Baku, 2003.
- USSR-Turkey: The Training Ground of the Cold War. Baku, 2005 (also in Azeri).
- USSR-Iran: Azerbaijan Crisis and the Beginning of the Cold War. Moscow, 2006.
- USSR-Turkey: from Neutralities to Cold War. 1939-1953, Moscow, 2008.
- Khruschev’s Thaw and the National Question in Azerbaijan (1954-1959). Moscow, 2009.
- Diplomatic History of the Republic of Azerbaijan. 1918-1920. Volume 1, Moscow, 2010.
- Russian Revolution and Azerbaijan: Difficult Road to Independence, 1917-1920. Moscow, 2011.
- Foreign Policy of Azerbaijan in the Soviet Period. 1920-1939. Moscow, Nauka - Filinta Publisher, 2013.
- Ali Mardan bey Topchibashov: life for the idea. Moscow, Nauka - Filinta Publisher, 2014.
- Soviet policy to expand the southern borders: Stalin and the Azerbaijan card in the struggle for oil, 1939-1945. Moscow, ROSSPEN, 2017
- Soviet Azerbaijan: From thaw to frost (1959-1969). Moscow, ROSSPEN, 2020

==== In Persian ====
- South Azerbaijan: The Beginning of The Cold War. Tehran, 2008.
- The Foreign Policy of the Azerbaijan Democratic Republic (1918-1920). Tehran, 2011.
- National Question in Azerbaijan: Political Leadership and Intelligentsia. 1954-1959. Tabriz, 2011.

==== In English ====
- At the Dawn of the Cold War: The Soviet-American Crisis over Iranian Azerbaijan, 1941-1946. Rowman and Littlefield Publishers Inc., 2006.
- Stalin and the Turkish Crisis of the Cold War, 1945-1953. Lexington Books, 2011.
- Khrushchev's Thaw and National Identity in Soviet Azerbaijan, 1954-1959. The Harvard Cold War Studies Book Series. Lexington Books: Lanham, Boulder, New York, London, 2014.
- Foreign Policy of the Republic of Azerbaijan: The Difficult Road to Western Integration, 1918-1920. Routledge, 2016
- Foreign Policy of the Republic of Azerbaijan, 1918-1920. The Difficult Road to Western Integration. Routledge, Taylor & Francis Group, London & New York 2016.
- The Sovietization of Azerbaijan: The South Caucasus in the Triangle of Russia, Turkey, and Iran, 1920-1922. The University of Utah Press, Salt Lake City, 2018.
- Leadership and Nationalism in Azerbaijan: Ali Mardan bey Topchibashov, Founder and Creator. Routledge Studies in the History of Russia and Eastern Europe. Taylor & Francis Group, London & New York, 2019.
- Soviet Policy in Xinjiang: Stalin and the National Movement in Eastern Turkistan. The Harvard Cold War Studies Book Series. Lexington Books: Lanham, Boulder, New York, London, 2021.
- Stalin's Early Cold War Foreign Policy: Southern Neighbours in the Shadow of Moscow, 1945-1947. Routledge: Taylor & Francis Group, London & New York, 2022. In Chinese
- Xinjiang in Soviet Policy: Stalin and the Muslim Movement in East Turkestan (1931-1949）. Hong Kong University Press, 2021. 蘇聯政策中的新疆 : 斯大林與東突厥斯坦的穆斯林運動,1931–1949. 香港中文大学出版社 (The Chinese University of Hong Kong Press), 2021.

=== Articles ===
1. The recognition of Azerbaijan’s sovereignty at the Paris Peace Conference. Azerbaijan Journal, No. 289, 1993 (Turkey).

2. Azerbaijan-American Relations. Azerbaijan Journal, No. 291-294, 1993 (Turkey).

3. Estrangement of Great Britain from Azerbaijan before the Russian invasion of 1920. Khudafarin Journal, No. 1, 1995 (Poland).

4. Atatürk: Independence and Nationalism. Conference material, Ankara (Turkey), 1995.

5. Azerbaijan-American Relations from 1918-20. A page in their history. Caspian Crossroads, Vol. 2, No. 1, 1996 (USA).

6. M.A. Rasulzade and Republic of Turkey. International Conference Material, Kayseri (Turkey), 1996.

7. The struggle for Baku Oil at the end of the World War I. Caspian Crossroads, No. 1, 1997 (USA).

8. Soviet invasion of South Azerbaijan. Tarih Journal, No. 137, 1998 (Turkey).

9. The spring of 1945: Moscow’s decisions and Southern Azerbaijan. Turk Dunyasi Arasdirmalari Journal, No: 121, 1999 (Turkey).

10. Southern Azerbaijan, 1945: Turning Point in the History. Caspian Crossroads, No: 4, 1999 (USA).

11. Southern Azerbaijan: Perturbed Spring of 1946. Conflict Journal, No. 2-3, 2000 (Baku).

12. Reflection of the US-Soviet Post-War Confrontation according to the Released Russian Archival Documents. Iran and the Great Powers, thesis report, Tehran, 2000.

13. The Leader of Russian Turks (A. N. Topchubashi). Türk Dünyası Araşdırmaları Journal, No. 127, 2000 (Turkey).

14. February 1946: Qavam As-Saltanah's Moscow Visit. Caspian Crossroads, Vol. 6, No. 3, 2003 (USA).

15. Soviet Policy in South Azerbaijan, 1941-1946. Vertikaly Istorii, No. 5, 2003 (Georgia).

16. La prima crisi della guerra fredda: Mosca e il petrolio iraniano (1943-1946). Ventunesimo Secolo, 2007, #13 (di Jamil Hasanli e Vladislav Zubok) Italia, Roma

17. Reaktionen und Folgen im Sudkauasus. Prager Fruhling. das internationale krisenjahr 1968. Bohlau, Verlag, Koln, Weimar, Wien, 2008.

18. Iranian Azerbaijan: The epicentrof the Cold War. Caucasus & Globalization, Vol. 2, Issue 1-2, 2008, Sweden

19. The “Turkish Crisis” of the Cold War and the South Caucasian republics. Caucasus & Globalization, Vol. 2, Issue 4, 2008, Vol. 3, Issue 1, 2009, Sweden.

20. Stalins Griff nach den Schwarzmeerengen: Die Entwicklung der sowjetisch-türkischen Beziehungen wahrend der ersten Phase des Zweiten Weltkrieges (1939-1941). In: Überfall auf Europa. Plante die Sowjetunion 1941 einen Angriffskrieg? Berlin, 2009.

21. Le “Crisis turca” nella Guerra fredda. Ventunessimo Secolo, 2009, #19 Italia, Roma.

22. The Republic of Azerbaijan in International Relations System (1918-1920). Azerbaijan in Global Politics: Crafting Foreign Policy. Azerbaijan Diplomatic Academy, 2009.

23. Azerbaijan at the Crossroads of Epochs: The First Attempt to Join the Free World (1917-1920). Caucasus & Globalization, Vol. 4, Issue 1, 2010, Sweden.

24. The Recognition of the Democratic Republic of Azerbaijan at the Versailles Peace Conference. Irs-Heritage, Spring 2010.

25. Karabakh: Looking into the Past in Search of the Truth. Caucasus & Globalization, Vol. 4, Issue 3-4, 2010, Sweden.

26. Chruschtschows Selbstinszenierung als Außenpolitiker Sowjetische Propaganda über den Wiener Gipfel am Beispiel Aserbaidschan. "Der Wiener Gipfel 1961, Chruschtschow & Kennedy". Diplomatischen Akademie in Wien, 2011, p. 387-395.

27. Moscow and the Delimitation of Karabakh in the 1920s. Azerbaijan in the World, Vol. IV, No. 16-20, 2011.

28. How the Caucasian Bureau of the C.C. R.C.P.(b) discussed the Karabakh Issue in 1920-1923. Caucasus & Globalization, Vol. 5, Issue 1-2, 2011, Sweden.

29. The historiography of the Azerbaijan Democratic Republic: Political conjecture and reality. Re-defining History. Historiography and Historical Understandings of Asian States in the Former Soviet Bloc. Edited by Hiroki Oka. Tohoku University, 2011.

30. Kars Conference: Known and unknown facts. Irs-Heritage, Autumn 2011.

31. Der Kampf um das Erdöl im Nahen und Mittleren Osten. Stalins Wirtschaftspolitik an der Sowjetischen Peripherie. Studien Verlag, 2011, pp. 297–326.

32. Nagorno-Karabakh: Old Delusions and New Interpretations. Caucasus & Globalization, Vol. 5, Issue 3-4, 2011, Sweden.

33. “The Iranian Epopee” of the Bolsheviks: The Deepening Conflict in the Southern Caspian (1920-1921). Caucasus & Globalization, Vol. 6, Issue 1, 2012, Sweden.

34. The Relations Turkey with the Soviet Union during the Cold War period. Politics in Central Asia and the Caucasus. Anadolu Üniversitesi, Eskişehir, 2012 (In Turkish), pp. 29–60.

35. Sovietization of Azerbaijan and Inclusion of Krabakh into the Diplomatic Agenda. Irs-Heritage, Spring 2013 - Summer 2013

36. Alimardan bey Topchubashov. Irs-Heritage, Summer 2013.

37. Alimardan bey Topchubashov: Life, Epoch, Comrades-in- Arms. Caucasus & Globalization, Vol. 7, Issue 1-2, 2013, Sweden.
