= Maharram Seyidov =

Azerbaijani military personnel

- Maharram Seyidov - National Hero of Azerbaijan
- Born: 7 September 1952; Alyshar, Nakhichevan ASSR, Azerbaijan SSR, Soviet Union
- Died: 19 January 1990 (aged 37); Sadarak District, Nakhichevan ASSR, Azerbaijan SSR, Soviet Union
- Burial place: Sharur city, Nakhchivan AR, Azerbaijan
- Occupation: Police captain
- Awards: National Hero of Azerbaijan; 1992

Maharram Miraziz oghlu Seyidov (Azerbaijani: Məhərrəm Mirəziz oğlu Seyidov) (7 September 1952 – 19 January 1990) was the National Hero of Azerbaijan and warrior during the First Nagorno-Karabakh War.

== Life ==
Seyidov was born on September 7, 1952, in the Alyshar village of the Sharur District of Nakhchivan Autonomous Republic of Azerbaijan. He finished village secondary school named after Nariman Narimanov in 1969. He started working for Bodies of Internal Affairs in the Kherson city after he was demobilized from the Army. He was awarded a medal for his distinguished service in the protection of public order during Moscow Olympic Games in 1980. He later graduated from Special Police School (present Police Academy). He was working as a Head Inspector within the Security Department of Sharur Internal Affairs Department. He was a police captain.

== Nagorno-Karabakh war ==
After occupation of the Karki village on 16 January 1990, Armenian forces started moving towards Sadarak District. When the Department of Internal Affairs of Sharur region received the news about this, they sent a group of police officers in order to protect the region and Mahharam Seyidov was also among those policemen. On the January 19, 1990, he was killed when rescuing the commander, Azer Seyidov in the battles for Sadarak.

== Family ==
He was married and had four children.

== Awards ==
Maharram Miraziz oghlu Seyidov was posthumously awarded the title of the "National Hero of Azerbaijan" by the decree # 831 of the President of Azerbaijan Republic on 6 June 1992.

He was buried at a Martyrs' Lane cemetery in Sharur city. There is a street and a monument from bronze in Sharur District after the hero. School # 2 in Sharur District is also named after Maharram Seyidov.

== Sources ==
- "Naxçıvan Ensiklopediyası" - 2 cilddə, II cild, Naxçıvan, 2005, səh 249. ISBN 5-8066-1468-9
- Vüqar Əsgərov. Azərbaycanın Milli Qəhrəmanları (kitab)|"Azərbaycanın Milli Qəhrəmanları" (Yenidən işlənmiş II nəşr). Bakı: "Dərələyəz-M", 2010, səh. 257.
