= Çəmənli, Beylagan =

Çəmənli, Beylagan may refer to these people:

- Aşağı Çəmənli, Azerbaijan
- Yuxarı Çəmənli, Azerbaijan
