= Qaraburc =

- Municipality
- Location within Azerbaijan
- Coordinates: 39°35′N 44°56′E
- Country: Azerbaijan
- Autonomous republic: Nakhchivan
- District: Sharur

Population (2005)
  - Total: 458
- Time zone: UTC+4 (AZT)

Qaraburc (also, Karaburdzh) is a village and municipality in the Sharur District of Nakhchivan, Azerbaijan. It is located 6 km away from the district center, on the bank of the Araz River. Its population is busy with farming and animal husbandry. There are secondary school, club and a medical center in the village. It has a population of 458.

== Etymology ==
The name made out from the words of qara (black) and bürc (the tower of fortress) and means "black colored tower". The name of the village was established with relation of the ruins of the ancient fortress in the near of the village. It is supposed that the name also is in version of Qalabürc (the tower of fortress). Since 2003, the name of the village was officially registered as Qaraburc. In the Turkic languages, the word of the burc//bürc was used in the meaning of "pepper", "fortified place, trench", "acorn".
