= Məmmədsabir =

- Municipality
- Location within Azerbaijan
- Coordinates: 39°33′N 45°00′E
- Country: Azerbaijan
- Autonomous republic: Nakhchivan
- District: Sharur

Population (2005)
  - Total: 967
- Time zone: UTC+4 (AZT)

Məmmədsabir (also, Mammadsabir) is a municipality and village in the Sharur District of Nakhchivan, Azerbaijan. Its population engaging in growing vegetables. There are secondary school, club, library and a medical center in the village. It has a population of 967.

== Etymology ==
In the sources, in the 2nd half of the 19th century, the village name has been mentioned as a settlement which consist of 21 houses. The name of the village is related with the person name of the Məmmədsabir.
