= Ajdar Ismailov =

Azerbaijani philologist and politician (1938–2022)

Ajdar Ismayilov
- İsmayılov Əjdər Tağı oğlu
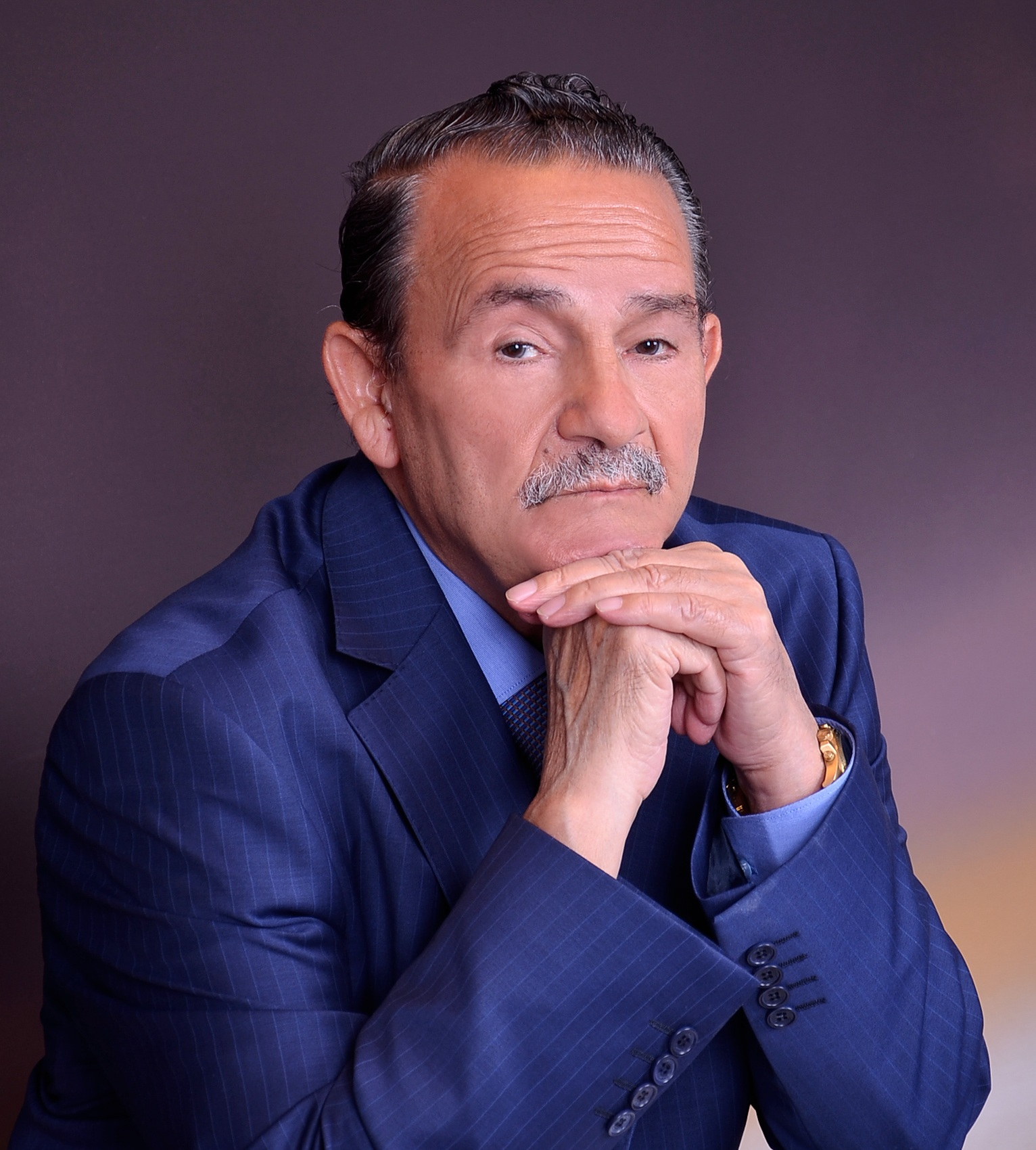
- Born: 23 April 1938; Chomakhtur, Sherur raion, Nakhchivan ASSR, Azerbaijan SSR, USSR
- Died: 13 March 2022 (aged 84); Baku, Azerbaijan
- Citizenship: USSR; Azerbaijan
- Education: Azerbaijan State University
- Known for: Professor

Ajdar Ismayilov (full name: Ajdar Tağı oğlu İsmayılov; 23 April 1938 – 13 March 2022) was an Azerbaijani doctor of philological sciences, and one of the most active founders of New Azerbaijan Party.

== Life ==
Ismayilov finished Azerbaijan State University, the faculty of philology in 1961. He was a teacher, school director, worker of "Sherg gapisi" newspaper of Ministry of Internal Affairs from 1961 to 1977 and a teacher of literature in Nakhchivan State University, senior teacher as assistant professor and professor, in 1977–1994.

Ismayilov died on 13 March 2022, at the age of 83.

== Scientific activity ==
Ismayilov was the candidate of Literature Institute at Azerbaijan SSR Academy of Sciences named Nizami in 1969. He defended his candidacy dissertation "The historical dramas of Huseyn Javid" ("The Prophet", "Topal Teymur", "Seyavush", "Khayyam") under the leadership of academician Mammad Arif Dadashzade, the vice president of academy, in 1974.

He started to research a doctoral thesis on the topic of "Huseyn Javid's creative work and demonism tradition in world literature" confirmed at The Scientific Council of Literature Institute named after Nizami, in 1982. In here, the Huseyn Javid romanticism source is told to be started from Zarvan (Avesta) philosophy, contrary to the thoughts that the formation of Azerbaijan romanticism is related to the affairs of 1905 to 1917. The poet's devotion to the creative ways of prominent figures was researched in the demonism context, especially the Turkish "Tenzimat literature" from the point of view of philosophy / aesthetics. The development issues and sequel of demonism traditions at world romanticism in H. Javid legacy were researched in the book. Ajdar Ismailov indicated the philosophical idea, mythological fiction roots of H.Javid creativity and he researched national and universal motives in poet's world.

== Political activity ==
Ismayilov played an active role in the political life of Azerbaijan since the end of 1980. He was against the invasion policy of the Kremlin, he supported Heydar Aliyev in his return to active politics and played a great role in the establishment of the New Azerbaijan Party.

== Works ==
=== Scientific monographs ===
"Romanticism tradition in world and Huseyn Javid". Baki: Yazichi, 1982, 220 pages. "Huseyn Javid tradition in Azerbaijan Soviet Literature" – methodical instruction. Baki. 1990. (It was printed by the order of 03.04.90 dated Azerbaijan) "Huseyn Javid creativity and the demonism tradition in world literature". Baki. Elm, 1991. 224 pages. "Ancient Fore Asia and Fore Caucasus Turkic tribes" (Armenians and Georgians in the land of Caucasian Oghuz Albania). Baki, "Nurlan", 2008. 799 pages. (First published in 2006) (It was printed by the decision of the Scientific Council of History Institute of Azerbaijan Science Academy named after A.A. Bakikhanov).

== Selected articles and interviews ==
- In front of the 250th birth anniversary of Molla Panah Vagif – Singer of beauty and love – "Sherg Gapisi", September 5, 1968. fourth page.
- Some specialties of Javid theatre – Gobustan 1972 #4. Pages: 16-20
- Some features of H. Javid's historical dramas – The 10th scientific meeting of council of Scientific Academy – thesis. Baki, 1973. Pages: 25-28
- The people and hero problems – Ulduz magazine 1973, #5. Pages: 62-64
- The free woman problem in H. Javid creativity – Azerbaijan magazine 1973, #7
- H. Javid and Shakespeare (Iblis - Othello) – Science and Life magazine, 1976, #9. Pages: 22-24
- H. Javid and Byron – Science and Life magazine
- H. Javid and Goethe – Science and Life magazine, 1980, #1. Pages: 35-38
- H. Javid and Shakespeare – Gobustan, 1981, #1. Pages: 15-17
- Javid, Jabbarli and Azerbaijan Soviet Theatre – Newspaper of "Azerbaijani teacher", #65 (3159), 15.08.1979
- Tracking a myth. Soviet Nakhchivan paper. 27.01.1980
- Belief in sun in Azerbaijan – Soviet Nakhchivan paper #176 (12999) 26.07.1981
- Spring holiday of our great ancestor – Soviet Nakhchivan paper #69, (14410) 18.03.1986
- ...It's the holy path we go on! – Sherur front – January 26, 1990, #4-5. P: 2
- Where is our way – Sherg Gapisi #142 (15.682) – June 30, 1990. P: 3
- Islamic fundamentalism: fictions, realities – Sherg Gapisi paper, #215 (15.755) – September 22, 1990. Pages: 2-3
- Russian Empire troops at Sherur borders – Sherur fights frontal bulletin – Sherur print house, December 1990 #1
- Today of old Sederek global situation – Azerbaijan magazine, 1991, #11
- Open letter to secretary-in-chief of Azerbaijan National Centre in Turkey, Ahmad Garaja from Nakhchivan (1st part) – Ses (Voice) paper, #41 (70) 01.10.1992
- Open letter to secretary-in-chief of Azerbaijan National Centre in Turkey, Ahmad Garaja from Nakhchivan (2nd part) – Ses (Voice) paper, #39 (68) 17.10.1992
- The leader of our party is the people – Ses (Voice) paper 09.12.1992
- The leader of our party is the people – Nakhchivan paper, #83 (267) 29.11.1997
- The New Azerbaijan Party is the party of future – Yeni Azerbaycan Paper, #92 (267) 29.11.1997
- I beg from almighty God – "For the victory" paper, #3-4 (3-4) 10.05.1999
- XXI century must be the century of Azerbaijan language and Azerbaijan ideology in our national history – "Iki sahil" paper. 24.06.2001. (the interview was taken by Yegane Aliyeva)
- The relation between "old Armenian statehood" illusion or "ishkil" (Outcast dog) ethnicity and "hay and armyan" meaning. "Iki sahil" paper. 31.10.2001
- The relation between "old Armenian statehood" illusion or "ishkil" (Outcast dog) ethnicity and "hay and armyan" meaning. "Iki sahil" paper. 02.11.2001
- The relation between "old Armenian statehood" illusion or "ishkil" (Outcast dog) ethnicity and "hay and armyan" meaning. "Iki sahil" paper. 03.11.2001
- The relation between "old Armenian statehood" illusion or "ishkil" (Outcast dog) ethnicity and "hay and armyan" meaning. "Iki sahil" paper. 06.11.2001
- The relation between "old Armenian statehood" illusion or "ishkil" (Outcast dog) ethnicity and "hay and armyan" meaning. "Iki sahil" paper. 07.11.2001
- The closest friend and companion – "Free Azerbaijan", #62 (820) 27.04.2005 (The interview was taken by Haji Tofig Seyidov)
- We need solidarity – national solidarity! 30.09.2006 (national solidarity interview)
- The problems of 15-year-old NAP (YAP) – National Solidarity #9 (29). 21.09.2007. (The Ruhiyya Nasimigizi interview)
- The historical realities about "The 26 Baku Commissars" or who are the 3 commissars without grave? – "Khalg" (People) paper-April 19, 2009. P: 4[9]
- There are no notions of honor, dignity and pride in Armenian. National Solidarity #04 (47). 30.04.2009. (The Ruhiyya Nasimigizi interview).
- Is it true to translate from Turkish to Turkish? (The National Solidarity paper interview) 31.01.2009
