= Kosacan =

- Municipality
- Location within Azerbaijan
- Coordinates: 39°31′N 45°01′E
- Country: Azerbaijan
- Autonomous republic: Nakhchivan
- District: Sharur

Population (2005)
  - Total: 1,258
- Time zone: UTC+4 (AZT)

Kosacan (also, Kosadzhan, Kasadzhan and Kosakan) is a village and municipality in the Sharur District of Nakhchivan Autonomous Republic, Azerbaijan. It is located 8 km in the south-east from the district center, on the plain. Its population is busy with warm nursery farm, grain-growing and vegetable-growing. There are secondary school, club, mosque and a medical center in the village. It has a population of 1,258.

== Etymology ==
According to some researchers, is the name was brought by the families from Kusakan town in Turkey, which was destroyed by the Mongols in the 13th century. There are also specific areals of this name in the territory of Azerbaijan: Kosakan (Zangilan), and Kusekana / Kusəkəran (Lerik). In Turkey, the Kösedağ (Kosadagh) mountain has been registered in the 80 km from the Sivas. The Kosakan name is made from the word kosak from ancient Turkic languages ("closed, combined") and -an suffix ("place, location"); it was formed in connection with the transition of the people to sedentary life.
