= Yuxarı Aralıq =

- Municipality
- Location within Azerbaijan
- Coordinates: 39°31′08″N 45°00′16″E
- Country: Azerbaijan
- Autonomous republic: Nakhchivan Autonomous Republic
- District: Sharur

Population (2005)
  - Total: 1,074
- Time zone: UTC+4 (AZT)

Yuxarı Aralıq (also, Yukhary Aralyg and Yukhari Aralik) is a village and municipality in the Sharur District of Nakhchivan Autonomous Republic, Azerbaijan. It is located 420 km in the south-east of the district center, on the right bank of the Arpachay River. Its population is agricultural.

== Etymology ==
The previous name of the village was Aralıq Başkənd (Aralyg Bashkend). The second component of the name was to distinguish the village from the same-named settlement. Aralıq means "middle, the center". In the Turkic languages, the word başkənd (bashkend) means "center", "main city", and "capital". The name of the village means "the Aralıq village which is located in the upper side".
