= Akhura =

Akhura may refer to:

- Akhurian River
- Axura, Azerbaijan
