= Cəlilkənd =

Jalilkend
- Municipality
- Azerbaijani: Cəlilkənd
- Location within Azerbaijan
- Coordinates: 39°34′22″N 45°00′38″E
- Country: Azerbaijan
- Autonomous republic: Nakhchivan
- District: Sharur

Population (2005)
  - Total: 1,701
- Time zone: UTC+4 (AZT)

Cəlilkənd (also, Jalilkend) is a village and municipality in the Sharur District of Nakhchivan Autonomous Republic, Azerbaijan. It is located in the left side of the Nakhchivan-Sadarak highway, 4 km in the north-east from the district center, on the Sharur plain. Its population is busy with grain-growing, foddering, vegetable-growing, beet-growing and animal husbandry. There are secondary school, cultural house, kindergarten, pharmacy, a medical center and House Museum of J. Memmedquluzade in the village. It has a population of 1,701. There are cyclops buildings of the 2nd millennium of BC (popularly called as qalaça) in the village.

== Etymology and History ==
Under Russian rule, from 1870 through 1917, the village formed a part of the Sharur-Daralayaz uezd. In 1961 the village was renamed in honour of Jalil Mammadguluzade, the writer and satirist who wrote his first allegorical work (Çay dəstgahı) while serving as a teacher (October 13, 1887 – January 13, 1890) at the local school. The name of the village is a toponym memorial.
