= Çimenli =

Çimenli may refer to several places in Turkey:

- Çimenli, Artvin
- Çimenli, Hopa
- Çimenli, Murgul
- Çimenli, Narman

== See also ==
- Çəmənli (disambiguation)
