= Tənənəm =

- Municipality
- Location within Azerbaijan
- Coordinates: 39°30′46″N 45°10′28″E
- Country: Azerbaijan
- Autonomous republic: Nakhchivan
- District: Sharur

Population (2005)
  - Total: 761
- Time zone: UTC+4 (AZT)

Tənənəm (also, Tananam and Tenenem) is a village and municipality in the Sharur District of Nakhchivan, Azerbaijan. It is located in the 9 km of the Nakhchivan-Sadarak highway, 24 km away from the district center, on the Sharur plain. Its population is busy with farming and animal husbandry. There are secondary school, club, library, kindergarten and a medical center in the village. It has a population of 761.

== Etymology ==
Some researchers equate Danequyn mount which is mentioned in the sources (5th century) with the Tənənəm name. It can be assumed that the name made out from the Iranian words of tən (body) and nəm (salt) means "mountain of salt, the salt mountain".

== Historical and Archaeological monuments ==
=== Tənənəm ===
Tənənəm - the settlement of the Middle Ages around of the same named village of the Sharur region. Into the village can be seen fallen bricks and the ruins of the old buildings; In the construction of the relatively unharmed part of the dome-type monument was used from the baked brick. The cooked glazed and simple pottery products in pink colored (decorated with green and blue colors) were discovered from the settlement. It is supposed that the settlement of the Tənənəm belongs to the 14-18th centuries.

=== Tənənəm Sanctuary ===
Tənənəm Piri - the Sanctuary of the Middle Ages in the Tənənəm village of the Sharur region. Among the local population is known as “Piri-Süleyman”.
