= Alışar, Azerbaijan =

Alışar
- Municipality
- Location within Azerbaijan
- Coordinates: 39°32′N 44°55′E
- Country: Azerbaijan
- Autonomous Republic: Nakhchivan
- District: Sharur

Government
  - president: Araz Hesenzade

Population (2005)
  - Total: 2,132
- Time zone: UTC+4 (AZT)

Alışar (also, Alyshar, Alishar, and Alisher) is a village and municipality in the Sharur District of Nakhchivan Autonomous Republic, Azerbaijan. It is located 5 km southwest of district center, on the bank of the Araz River, on the Sharur plain. Its population is engaged with grain-growing and animal husbandry. The village has a secondary school, a club, a library and a medical center. It has a population of 2,132. National Hero of Azerbaijan Maharram Seyidov was born in this village.

== Notable natives ==
- Maharram Seyidov — National Hero of Azerbaijan
- Seyyad Ezizoglu - Poet
