= Aşağı Daşarx =

- Municipality
- Location within Azerbaijan
- Coordinates: 39°31′25″N 45°02′08″E
- Country: Azerbaijan
- Autonomous republic: Nakhchivan
- District: Sharur

Population (2005)
  - Total: 663
- Time zone: UTC+4 (AZT)

Aşağı Daşarx (also, Ashaga Dasharkh and Ashaghy Dasharkh) is a village and municipality in the Sharur District of Nakhchivan Autonomous Republic, Azerbaijan. It is located in the left side of the Nakhchivan-Sadarak highway, 14 km away from the district center, on the plain. Its population is busy with beet-growing and vegetable-growing. There are secondary school, library, club and a medical center in the village. It has a population of 663.

== Etymology ==
The name of the village of Aşağı Daşarx (Ashaghy Dasharkh) means "the lower part of the settlement of Dasharkh". The village was founded by families which moved out from former Dasharkh village (present Yuxarı (Upper) Daşarx) during the 1930s collectivization. (See, Yuxarı Daşarx).

== Historical and archaeological monuments ==
=== Aşağı Daşarx ===
Aşağı Daşarx (Lower Dasharkh) - is the ancient settlement, in the center of the same named village of the Sharur region. As a result of archaeological research was encountered four building layer, stone tools, ceramic products and remnants of animal bone of the early Bronze Age. The thickness of cultural layer is 3.60 m. Monument is attributed to the end of the IV millennium and the beginning of the III millennium of BC.

=== Aşağı Daşarx Necropolis ===
Aşağı Daşarx Necropolis - archaeological monument the first Iron Age in the north-west of the same named village of Sharur. The sowing areas, from the north side is limited with the irrigation canal. During agricultural works in the area of the necropolis a few soil graves were destroyed. The rich samples of material culture have been collected . The findings, mainly consist of pottery products (bowl, jug, mug etc.). Such a samples of clay plates are well known from Sarı dərə, Şahtaxtı, Qızıl burun and other monuments. The findings are kept in the museum of history and ethnography of the Sharur.
