= Əlikli =

Ələkli
- Municipality
- Location within Azerbaijan
- Coordinates: 39°30′24″N 45°00′46″E
- Country: Azerbaijan
- Autonomous republic: Nakhchivan
- District: Sharur

Population (2005)
  - Total: 1,284
- Time zone: UTC+4 (AZT)

Ələkli, old name: Əlikli (also, Alakli and Alyaklu) is a village and municipality in the Sharur District of Nakhchivan Autonomous Republic, Azerbaijan. It is located 7 km in the south-east from the district center, on the left bank of the Arpachay River. Its population is mainly busy with farming. There are secondary school, club and a medical center in the village. It has a population of 1,284.
