= Püsyan =

- Municipality
- Location within Azerbaijan
- Coordinates: 39°26′37″N 45°01′18″E
- Country: Azerbaijan
- Autonomous republic: Nakhchivan
- District: Sharur

Population (2005)
  - Total: 3,751
- Time zone: UTC+4 (AZT)

Püsyan is a village and municipality in the Sharur District of Nakhchivan, Azerbaijan. It is located in the near of the Azerbaijan international railway and highway, 23 km in the south-east from the district center, on the plain. Its population is busy with grain-growing, beet-growing, foddering and animal husbandry. There are secondary school, cultural house, library and a hospital in the village. It has a population of 3,751.

== Etymology ==
According to researchers, the settlement has been called Püsyan, as a result of the settled by the families belonging to the Pusyan tribe of Kurdish origin. Some researchers says that Püsyan or Pesyan is the ancient name which were given to the area where lived the Turkic-speaking pasianlar in the BC in the upper reaches of the river Araz (mainly in Turkey). In the documents of 1833, there are information about pusyanlylar which were one of the nine tribe communities in the territory of Nakhchivan.

== Historical and archaeological monuments ==
=== Püsyan ===
Püsyan - the settlement of the ancient period in the south-east from the same named village of the Sharur region. The area is 3 hectares. It was recorded in 1987. Extensive research work didn't carry out. As a result of the archaeological exploration were found the patterns of light, yellow-colored clay pots (bowl, jug-type containers), etc. samples of material cultural. The findings belong to the 1 millennium of BC and 1-2 centuries of AD.

=== Püsyan Necropolis ===
Püsyan Necropolis - the archaeological monument of the ancient period in the south-east from the same named village of the Sharur region. It is surrounded on all sides by sowing fields. According to the destroyed monuments, its area is more than 1200 square meters. In 1981, it was discovered during farm works in the area. The monuments consist of stone box and soil graves; skeletons were in wrapped condition to the north-west direction. The founded archaeological materials consist of the yellow clay pots (jug, pitcher, bowl, kettle-type containers, etc.). The materials founded from Pusyan necropolis is known from the monuments of the late ancient period of Azerbaijan. The founded materials are stored in the Museum of History and Ethnography of Sharur. It is supposed that the monument belongs to the 2-1 centuries of BC.
