= Vərməziyar =

- Municipality
- Location within Azerbaijan
- Coordinates: 39°29′08″N 44°59′04″E
- Country: Azerbaijan
- Autonomous republic: Nakhchivan
- District: Sharur

Population (2005)
  - Total: 1,269
- Time zone: UTC+4 (AZT)

Vərməziyar (also, Varmaziyar) is a village and municipality in the Sharur District of Nakhchivan, Azerbaijan. It is located 9 km away from the district center, on the plain. Its population is mainly busy with farming. There are secondary school, library, club and a medical center in the village. It has a population of 1,269.

== Etymology ==
The name of the Vərməziyar village made out from the components of the Old Azeri (an Iranian language) word of var (castle, village) and Məzyar (person's name) means "the village which belongs to Məzyar".
