= Mahmudkənd =

- Municipality
- Location within Azerbaijan
- Coordinates: 39°34′38″N 45°02′15″E
- Country: Azerbaijan
- Autonomous republic: Nakhchivan
- District: Sharur

Population (2009)
  - Total: 4,248
- Time zone: UTC+4 (AZT)

Mahmudkənd (also, Makhmudkend) is a village and municipality in the Sharur District of Nakhchivan Autonomous Republic, Azerbaijan. It is located in the right side of the Nakhchivan-Sadarak highway, 8 km in the east from the district center, on the plain. Its population is busy with grain-growing, vegetable-growing, vine-growing, beet-growing, foddering and animal husbandry. There are secondary school, cultural house, library, and hospital in the village. It has a population of 3,950.

== Etymology ==
The name of the village means "Mahmud's village, the village belonging to Mahmud". The geographical names founded by the use of Mahmud (Mahmoud) person name, also meets in the territory of Dagestan: Mahmudkand village, Mahmudtataul channel.
