= Şükürağalı =

Village in Aghdam District, Azerbaijan

Coordinates: 40°05′N 47°03′E

Şükürağalı is a village in the municipality of Çəmənli in the Agdam Rayon of Azerbaijan.
