= Aşağı Aralıq =

- Municipality
- Location within Azerbaijan
- Coordinates: 39°31′42″N 45°00′34″E
- Country: Azerbaijan
- Autonomous republic: Nakhchivan
- District: Sharur

Population (2005)
  - Total: 953
- Time zone: UTC+4 (AZT)

Aşağı Aralıq (also, Ashaghy Aralyg and Ashagi Aralik; until 1935, Aralıq Başkənd) is a municipality and village in the Sharur District of Nakhchivan Autonomous Republic, Azerbaijan. It is located 5 km in the south-east from the district center, on the right bank of the Arpachay River, in the near of the international railway of Azerbaijan Republic. Its population is busy with gardening, vegetable-growing and animal husbandry. There are secondary school, club and a medical center in the village. It has a population of 953. The villages of district and the city of Nakhchivan are being provided with drinking water from the quality drinking water source of its territory.

== Etymology ==
The settlement was found by families which was moved out from the former Aralıq Başkənd village (present Yuxarı (Upper) Aralıq) and named as the Aşağı (Lower) Aralıq Başkənd (Lower Aralyg Bashkend). Later, the Bashkend component of the toponym has been abbreviated and officially has been registered at the present form. Aralıq means "middle, the center ". In the Turkic languages, the word of başkənd (bashkend) also are using in meaning as "center", "main city", "capital". The name of the village means "the Aralıq village which is located in the lower side".

== Notable natives ==
- Vasif Talibov — Chairman of Ali Majlis of Nakhchivan Autonomous Republic (since 1993).
