= Muğanlı, Kurdamir =

Mughanly
- Municipality
- Azerbaijani: Muğanlı
- Location within Azerbaijan
- Coordinates: 40°19′20″N 48°19′29″E
- Country: Azerbaijan
- Rayon: Kurdamir
- Time zone: UTC+4 (AZT)
  - Summer (DST): UTC+5 (AZT)

Muğanlı (also, Mughanly) is a village and municipality in the Kurdamir District of Azerbaijan.
