= Sharur =

City + Municipality in Nakhchivan, Azerbaijan

Sharur Şərur
- City & Municipality
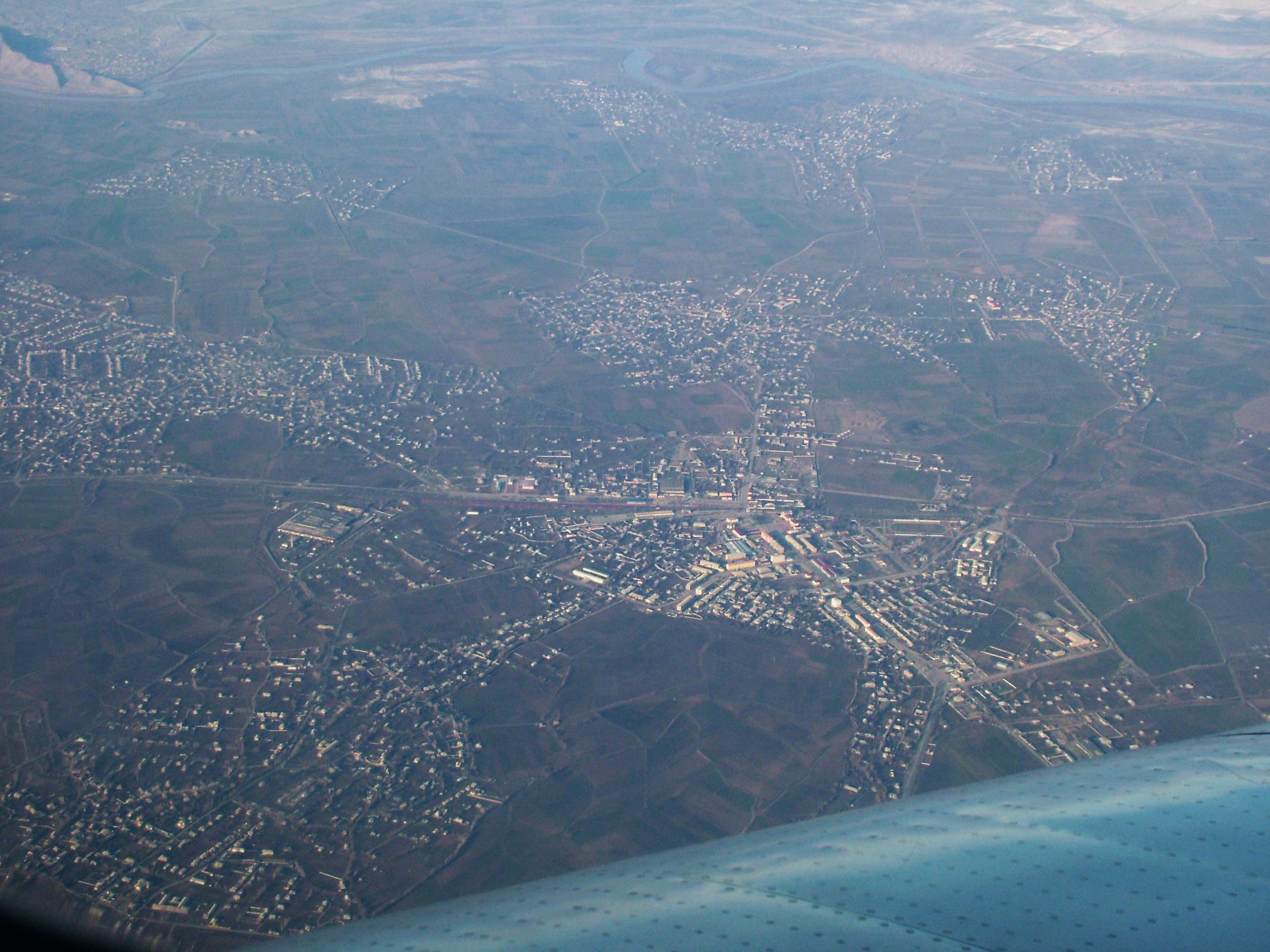
- Sharur from air

- Location within Azerbaijan
- Coordinates: 39°32′45″N 44°58′20″E
- Country: Azerbaijan
- Autonomous republic: Nakhchivan
- District: Sharur

Population (2020)
  - Total: 7,400
- Time zone: UTC+4 (AZT)
- Area code: +994 892

Sharur (Azerbaijani: Şərur) is a city in the Nakhchivan Autonomous Republic of Azerbaijan. It is the administrative centre of the Sharur District. The city is located 66 km northwest of Nakhchivan city, on the Sharur plain.

== History ==
In a manuscript of the 16th-century Oghuz heroic epic Book of Dede Korkut stored in Dresden, the place Sheryuguz is mentioned, which, according to a Russian orientalist and historian Vasily Bartold, is a distorted form of Sharur. In the Russian Empire, the town was the administrative centre of the Sharur-Daralayaz uezd of the Erivan Governorate and was renamed to Bash-Norashen.

In 1948, the city received the status of an urban-type settlement, and on 26 May 1964, it was renamed from Norashen to Ilyichevsk, after Vladimir Ilyich Lenin. In 1981, Ilyichevsk received the status of a city, and in 1991 the city was renamed Sharur according to the historical name of the area.

== Demographics ==
Until 1905, Sharur, then known as Bashnorashen (Russian: Башнорашен), was composed of 100 Armenian and 25 Tatar households, a Russian primary school, telegraph-office, and a police station. The population was engaged in gardening, cultivated cotton and rice. The Armenian element of the population was "eliminated" during the Armenian–Tatar massacres of 1905–1906. In 1897, Bashnorashen, which had the status of a selo ("rural locality"), had a population of 867 consisting of 597 Tatars and 132 Armenians. In the early 20th century, the settlement had a predominantly Tatar population of 749.

According to official information from The State Statistics Committee of Azerbaijan, on January 1, 2020, the city had a population of about 7,400.

Ethnic groups of Sharur (1939–1979)
| Ethnic group | 1897 | | 1939 | | 1959 | | 1970 | | 1979 | |
| Ethnic group | Number | % | Number | % | Number | % | Number | % | Number | % |
|---|---|---|---|---|---|---|---|---|---|---|
| Azerbaijanis | 597 | 68.86 | 351 | 53.26 | 1,214 | 88.16 | 2,125 | 93.12 | 3,131 | 95.31 |
| Russians | 28 | 3.23 | 129 | 19.58 | 81 | 5.88 | 106 | 4.65 | 112 | 3.41 |
| Ukrainians | 2 | 0.23 | 11 | 1.67 | 0 | 0.00 | 106 | 4.65 | 112 | 3.41 |
| Armenians | 132 | 15.22 | 129 | 19.58 | 63 | 4.58 | 29 | 1.27 | 27 | 0.82 |
| Kurds | 90 | 10.38 | 2 | 0.30 | 0 | 0.00 | 13 | 0.57 | 7 | 0.21 |
| Other | 18 | 2.08 | 37 | 5.61 | 19 | 1.38 | 9 | 0.39 | 8 | 0.24 |
| TOTAL | 867 | 100.00 | 659 | 100.00 | 1,377 | 100.00 | 2,282 | 100.00 | 3,285 | 100.00 |

== Culture ==
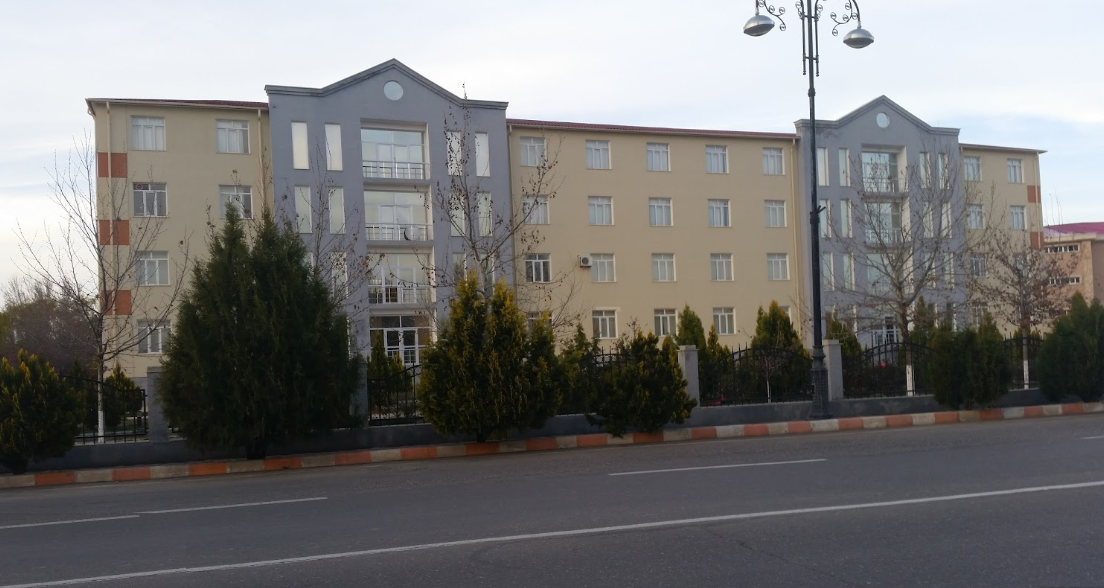
Sharur Turkish High School

Sharur has two parks, a stadium, a museum, a mosque, a monument-memorial to those killed in the First Nagorno-Karabakh war and a cinema.

== Notable natives ==
- Arthur Voloshin – Hero of Russia.
- Adil Aliyev – President of the Azerbaijan Kickboxing Federation and a member of the National Assembly of Azerbaijan.

== Twin Towns ==
- Iğdır, Turkey
