= Çomaxtur =

- Municipality
- Location within Azerbaijan
- Coordinates: 39°31′50″N 44°58′09″E
- Country: Azerbaijan
- Autonomous republic: Nakhchivan
- District: Sharur

Population (2005)
  - Total: 3,117
- Time zone: UTC+4 (AZT)

Çomaxtur (also, Chomakhtur) is a village and municipality in the Sharur District of Nakhchivan Autonomous Republic, Azerbaijan. It is located 1 km in the south-west from the district center, on the Sharur plain. Its population is busy with grain-growing, vegetable-growing, foddering, vine-growing animal husbandry. There are secondary school, cultural house, library and a medical center in the village. It has a population of 3,117.

== Etymology ==
Chomakhtur, "Jomarty". The village was previously called Jomardi. Source Encyclopedia of the Nakhchivan Autonomous Republic, Volume 1.

== Notable people ==
- Tagi Ismailov
- Javid Ismayil
