= Muğanlı, Shamakhi =

Mughanly
- Municipality
- Azerbaijani: Muğanlı
- Location within Azerbaijan
- Coordinates: 40°39′51″N 48°31′42″E
- Country: Azerbaijan
- Rayon: Shamakhi

Population
  - Total: 1,061
- Time zone: UTC+4 (AZT)
  - Summer (DST): UTC+5 (AZT)

Muğanlı (also, Mughanly) is a village and municipality in the Shamakhi District of Azerbaijan. It has a population of 1,061.
