= Çərçiboğan =

- Municipality
- Location within Azerbaijan
- Coordinates: 39°32′N 44°59′E
- Country: Azerbaijan
- Autonomous republic: Nakhchivan
- District: Sharur

Population (2005)
  - Total: 3,374
- Time zone: UTC+4 (AZT)

Çərçiboğan (also, Charchibogan) is a village and municipality in the Sharur District of Nakhchivan Autonomous Republic, Azerbaijan. It is located 3 km in the south from the district center. Its population is busy with beet-growing, foddering and animal husbandry. There are secondary schools, music schools, libraries, clubs, cultural houses and hospitals in the village. It has a population of 3,374.

== Etymology ==
The name of the Çərçiboğan is related with the name of the same named river. Hydronym was made out from components of çərçi (dealer) and boğan (stifle, drown verbs) means "the river which the dealer was drown".
