= Axaməd =

- Municipality
- Location within Azerbaijan
- Coordinates: 39°34′58″N 44°54′38″E
- Country: Azerbaijan
- Autonomous republic: Nakhchivan
- District: Sharur

Population (2005)
  - Total: 896
- Time zone: UTC+4 (AZT)

Axaməd (also, Ağəməd, Ağaəhməd, Aghakhmed, and Akhamed) is a village and municipality in the Sharur District of Nakhchivan Autonomous Republic, Azerbaijan. It is located 8 km in the north-east from the district center, on the bank of the Araz River. Its population is busy with farming and animal husbandry. There are secondary school, library and a medical center in the village. It has a population of 896.

== Etymology ==
It is assumed that the name of the village is the distortion form of the name of Ağaəhməd (Aghaahmed). The name is related with the person name of Ağaəhməd.

== Historical and archaeological monuments ==
=== Axamət ===
Axamət, А х а m m a d - the settlement of the 1st millennium of BC in the southwest of the same named village, in Sharur region. During field works in the area were discovered the large building stones, stone tools, and also products of pottery. As a result of archaeological research (2001) in the area were discovered samples of material culture (patterns of exquisitely crafted pot, etc.). The pot in gray colored of mixed from clay and well cooked has been made symmetrical in the potter's wheel. Inside of pot has been glazed with a dark red color.
