= Çəmənli, Barda =

Çəmənli
- Municipality
- Location within Azerbaijan Location within Karabakh Economic Region
- Coordinates: 40°23′18″N 47°04′12″E
- Country: Azerbaijan
- Rayon: Barda

Population
  - Total: 228
- Time zone: UTC+4 (AZT)
  - Summer (DST): UTC+5 (AZT)

Çəmənli (known as Dilənçilər, Dilanchilar or Dilenchiler until 2009) is a village and municipality in the Barda Rayon of Azerbaijan. It has a population of 228.
