= Xanlıqlar, Nakhchivan =

Xanlıqlar
- Municipality
- Azerbaijani: Xanlıqlar
- Location within Azerbaijan
- Coordinates: 39°30′10″N 45°01′43″E
- Country: Azerbaijan
- Autonomous republic: Nakhchivan
- District: Sharur

Population (2005)
  - Total: 2,091
- Time zone: UTC+4 (AZT)

Xanlıqlar (also, Khanlyglar) is a village and municipality in the Sharur District of Nakhchivan, Azerbaijan. It is located 8 km in the south-east from the district center, on the Sharur plain. Its population is busy with vine-growing and animal husbandry. The village has a grape processing factory, secondary school, club, library and a medical center. It has a population of 2,091, and there is a sanctuary called "Imamzade" in the village.

== Etymology ==
The settlement was so named Xanlıq because it was built on the property territory named Khanlyg (Khanate), which belonged to the Nakhchivan Khans.
