= Çəmənli, Nakhchivan =

Çəmənli
- Municipality
- Location within Azerbaijan
- Coordinates: 39°30′N 44°59′E
- Country: Azerbaijan
- Autonomous republic: Nakhchivan
- District: Sharur

Population (2005)
  - Total: 898
- Time zone: UTC+4 (AZT)

Çəmənli (also, Chamanli; until 2003, Keştaz and Keshtaz) is a village and municipality in the Sharur District of Nakhchivan Autonomous Republic, Azerbaijan. It is located 7 km in the south-east from the district center, on the right bank of the Arpachay River. Its population is busy with grain-growing, vegetable-growing, foddering, farming and animal husbandry. There are secondary school, library, club and a medical center in the village. It has a population of 898.

== Etymology ==
The name of Keştaz was made out from the words of keş in ancient Turkic languages (belt, sash, zone) and in the Azerbaijani dialects of the ancient word of taz (long) means "long girdle" and expresses the located area of the village. Since 2003, the name of the village is officially registered as Çəmənli (Chamanli). The name of Çəmənli means "meadow".
