= İkinci Muğanlı =

Mughanly Azerbaijani: Muğanlı
- Location within Azerbaijan
- Coordinates: 39°05′29″N 46°46′40″E
- Country: Azerbaijan
- District: Zangilan
- Time zone: UTC+4 (AZT)
  - Summer (DST): UTC+5 (AZT)

Mughanly (Azerbaijani: Muğanlı) is a village in the Zangilan District of Azerbaijan.

== History ==
The village was located in the Armenian-occupied territories surrounding Nagorno-Karabakh, coming under the control of ethnic Armenian forces in October 1993 during the First Nagorno-Karabakh War.

The village subsequently became part of the self-proclaimed Republic of Artsakh as part of its Kashatagh Province.

It was recaptured by Azerbaijan on 20 October 2020 during the Aras Valley campaign in the 2020 Nagorno-Karabakh war.
