= Muğanlı, Barda =

Mughanly
- Municipality
- Azerbaijani: Muğanlı
- Location within Azerbaijan
- Coordinates: 40°21′11″N 47°05′01″E
- Country: Azerbaijan
- Rayon: Barda

Population
  - Total: 621
- Time zone: UTC+4 (AZT)
  - Summer (DST): UTC+5 (AZT)

Muğanlı (also, Mughanly) is a village and municipality in the Barda District of Azerbaijan. It has a population of 621.
