= Çəmənli, Agdam =

Çəmənli
- Municipality
- Location within Azerbaijan Location within Karabakh Economic Region
- Coordinates: 40°04′26″N 47°02′28″E
- Country: Azerbaijan
- Rayon: Agdam

Population
  - Total: 2,207
- Time zone: UTC+4 (AZT)
  - Summer (DST): UTC+5 (AZT)

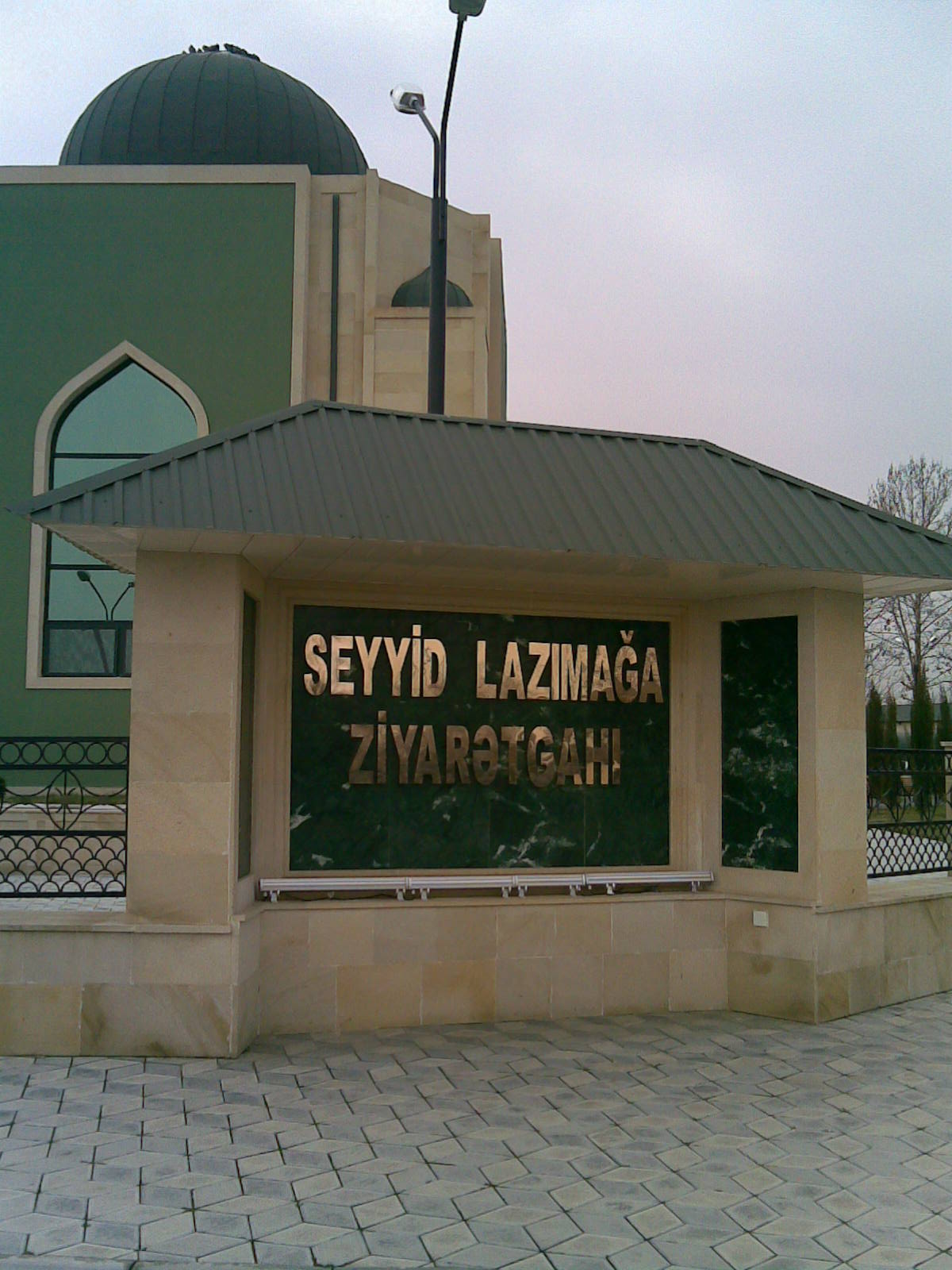
Seyid Lazım Ağa ziyarətgahı

Çəmənli (Chamanli) is a village and municipality in the Agdam District of Azerbaijan. It has a population of 2,207. The municipality consists of the villages of Çəmənli and Şükürağalı.
