= Muğanlı, Nakhchivan =

Mughanly
- Municipality
- Azerbaijani: Muğanlı
- Location within Azerbaijan
- Coordinates: 39°32′N 44°56′E
- Country: Azerbaijan
- Autonomous republic: Nakhchivan
- District: Sharur

Population (2005)
  - Total: 1,090
- Time zone: UTC+4 (AZT)

Muğanlı (also, Mughanly and Mughanlu) is a village and municipality in the Sharur District of Nakhchivan Autonomous Republic, Azerbaijan. It is located 4 km away from the district center, on the plain. Its population is busy with grain-growing, tobacco-growing, vegetable-growing, foddering, vine-growing and animal husbandry. There are secondary school, library, club, mosque and a medical center in the village. It has a population of 1,090.

== Etymology ==
There exists 18 settlements in the territory of Azerbaijan in connection with the name of Mughan. The settlements in Aghdam, Aghstafa, Barda, Goranboy, Kurdamir, Gubadly, Shamakhi, Zagatala, Zangilan and other areas is an example to this. The settlements were founded by the families belonging to the Mollahasanli, Mehdili and Jabbarly generations who moved from the Mughanly village of Iran. The name is related with the name of the families belonging to the Iranian Mugh مغ (Magi) priestly tribe.

The tribe name of Mughanly, is known from the beginning of the 16th century. Later, in the sources the Moghani who registered as independent tribe within Shahsevan tribes of Iran, consisted from 8 unions on the beginning of the 19th century. Because of the tribe lived in the Mughan plain, they were named with the name of the same plain.

== Historical and archaeological monuments ==
=== Muğanlı Necropolis ===
Mughanly Necropolis - the monument of the medieval ages in the near of the Mughanly village of Sharur region. Currently, overground signs of the monument has been lost, it has become a sown area. According to the local people, here were once the ram stones; one of them is in Sharur History Museum. According to the finding ram stones, the Mughanli necropolis belongs to the 15-16 centuries.
