= Muğanlı (Bağbanlar), Agdam =

Muğanlı
- Location within Azerbaijan Location within Karabakh Economic Region
- Coordinates: 39°55′57.5″N 46°58′53.0″E
- Country: Azerbaijan
- Rayon: Agdam
- Time zone: UTC+4 (AZT)
  - Summer (DST): UTC+5 (AZT)

Muğanlı (Mughanly) is a village in the Agdam District of Azerbaijan.
