= Supreme Assembly (Nakhchivan) =

Nakhchivan Autonomous Republic legislature

Supreme Assembly of the Nakhchivan Autonomous Republic Azerbaijani: Naxçıvan Muxtar Respublikasının Ali Məclisi
- 6th convocation

Type
- Type: Unicameral

History
- Founded: 17 November 1990
- Preceded by: Supreme Soviet of the Nakhichevan Autonomous Soviet Socialist Republic

Leadership
- Chairman: Bakhtiyar Mammadov (acting) (New Azerbaijan Party) since September 26, 2024

Structure
- Seats: 45
- Political groups: Government (41): New Azerbaijan (41); Support (1): Independents (1); Opposition (1): Azerbaijani Popular Front Party (1); Vacant (2): Vacant (2)

Elections
- Voting system: First-past-the-post voting
- First election: 30 September 1990
- Last election: 1 September 2024
- Next election: 2028

Website
- alimajlis.gov.az

The Supreme Assembly of the Nakhchivan Autonomous Republic (Azerbaijani: Naxçıvan Muxtar Respublikasının Ali Məclisi) is the legislative assembly of Nakhchivan. It was established in 1990, when Nakchivan declared independence from the Soviet Union to become an autonomous republic of Azerbaijan. It governs the republic, and is subordinate to the National Assembly of Azerbaijan. The current parliamentary chairman (since 2023) and the de facto leader of Nakhchivan is Anar Ibrahimov.

== General information ==
Legislative power within Nakhchivan is held by the Supreme Assembly. The Assembly is composed of 45 members, elected by the people for 5 years by secret ballot. Sessions are held twice a year; extraordinary sessions may be convened by the President of Azerbaijan, the National Assembly of Azerbaijan, by any 16 individuals of the Supreme Assembly, or by the Chairman of the Supreme Assembly.

Any citizen of Nakhchivan who meets basic requirements may be elected a member. A deputy of the Supreme Assembly may be removed from his post upon his renunciation of Nakhchivani citizenship, serious wrongdoing, or the demonstration of electoral fraud.

== General rules characterized by the Supreme Assembly ==
The Supreme Assembly of the Autonomous Republic enacts the laws of the republic, including those on revenue, finance, social security, natural security, tourism, elections, science, and culture. The assembly also approves the national budget of Nakhchivan, and endorses the Cabinet of Ministers and its composition.

== Chairmen ==
This is a list of office-holders from 1991:

Name	Entered office	Left office
Heydar Aliyev	September 5, 1991	June 23, 1993
Vasif Talibov	July 3, 1993	April 4, 1994
Namig Hasanov	April 4, 1994	December 16, 1995
Vasif Talibov	December 16, 1995	December 21, 2022
Azer Zeynalov	December 21, 2022	October 5, 2023
Anar Ibrahimov	October 5, 2023	September 26, 2024
Bakhtiyar Mammadov	September 26, 2024	

== Constitutional information ==
Every citizen of the Republic of Azerbaijan, who permanently resides in the territory of the Nakhchivan Autonomous Republic and has the right to participate in elections, may be elected as a deputy of the Supreme Assembly of the Nakhchivan Autonomous Republic in accordance with the law. The assembly consists of 45 members.

Laws are proposed by Assembly if legislation gets 31 out of 45 votes during the session.

The highest official is the chairman of the Supreme Assembly. Members are elected for 5 years term. Every citizen of the Republic of Azerbaijan, who permanently resides in the territory of the Nakhchivan Autonomous Republic has the right to participate in the elections and get elected as a deputy, according to law.

The Assembly holds 2 sessions per year and extra sessions can be called by the president, parliament or 16 members of Assembly.

According to the constitution, Nakhchivan is an Autonomous Republic within Azerbaijan. The constitution divides the government into three branches: the legislative branch, the executive branch, and the judicial branch. Legislative power in Nakhchivan is exercised by Supreme Assembly of Nakhchivan.
