= Çəmənli, Jalilabad =

Çəmənli
- Municipality
- Location within Azerbaijan
- Coordinates: 39°13′00″N 48°18′00″E
- Country: Azerbaijan
- Rayon: Jalilabad
- Time zone: UTC+4 (AZT)
  - Summer (DST): UTC+5 (AZT)

Çəmənli (known as Təzəkənd until 2015) is a village and municipality in the Jalilabad Rayon of Azerbaijan.
