= Yuxarı Çəmənli =

- Municipality
- Location within Azerbaijan
- Coordinates: 39°40′15″N 47°47′33″E
- Country: Azerbaijan
- Rayon: Beylagan

Population
  - Total: 514
- Time zone: UTC+4 (AZT)
  - Summer (DST): UTC+5 (AZT)

Yuxarı Çəmənli (also, Yukhary Chemenli) is a village and municipality in the Beylagan Rayon of Azerbaijan. It has a population of 514.
