= Axura =

- Municipality
- Location within Azerbaijan
- Coordinates: 39°33′44″N 45°09′41″E
- Country: Azerbaijan
- Autonomous republic: Nakhchivan
- District: Sharur

Population (2005)
  - Total: 1,481
- Time zone: UTC+4 (AZT)

Axura (also, Akhura) is a village and municipality in the Sharur District of Nakhchivan Autonomous Republic, Azerbaijan. It is located 20 km away from the district center, on the right bank of the Akhura River (tributary of the Eastern Arpachay River). Its population is busy with grain-growing and animal husbandry. There are secondary and incomplete secondary schools, a cultural house and a medical center in the village. It has a population of 1,481.

== Etymology ==
The village got its name from the river of the same named in the area. Its previous name was the Yeni Axura (New Akhura). First time the name of the settlement which was named Axura was mentioned in the sources of the 7th century. On June 20, 1840, the Axura village which was located at the foot of Mount Ararat, has been destroyed at the result of a strong earthquake. The population of the village has moved to the current area and established the village of Yeni Akhura. Later, the first component of name of the village has fallen and the village was named Axura. At the language of the monuments, the words of axur/akur/akuru expresses in the meaning of "covered; quiet, silent, slow; free".

== Historical and archaeological monuments ==
=== Axura Necropolis I ===
Axura Necropolis I is the archaeological monument of the end of the Iron Age, in the north of the village of Axura, in the Sharur region. Because of its location on the bank of the Axura River, a portion of the necropolis destroyed by the flood waters. The area of its surviving part approximately is 150×100 m. The tombstones consist of giant stones and they in conical shape. Depth of the two of soil graves are 1.5 m. Both of them were skeletons of men, on the length of 185 cm.

=== Axura Necropolis II ===
Axura Necropolis II is the archaeological monument of the ancient period in the 1 km east from Axura necropolis I, on the right bank of the Akhura River, in the Sharur region. At the result of archaeological excavations, the two graves have been studied and identified that both of them consist of soil graves. Samples of material culture have been found from the graves.
