= Aşağı Çəmənli =

- Municipality
- Location within Azerbaijan
- Coordinates: 39°40′58″N 47°48′57″E
- Country: Azerbaijan
- Rayon: Beylagan

Population
  - Total: 1,143
- Time zone: UTC+4 (AZT)
  - Summer (DST): UTC+5 (AZT)

Aşağı Çəmənli (also, Ashagy Chemenli and Novoye Chemenly) is a village and municipality in the Beylagan Rayon of Azerbaijan. It has a population of 1,143.
