= Yuxarı Daşarx =

- Municipality
- Location within Azerbaijan
- Coordinates: 39°33′22″N 45°02′29″E
- Country: Azerbaijan
- Autonomous republic: Nakhchivan
- District: Sharur

Population (2005)
  - Total: 1,499
- Time zone: UTC+4 (AZT)

Yuxarı Daşarx (also, Yukhari-Dasharkh and Yukhary-Dasharkh) is a village and municipality in the Sharur District of Nakhchivan, Azerbaijan. It is located on the Nakhchivan-Sadarak highway, 8 km away from the district center. Its population is busy with gardening, vegetable-growing and horticulture. There are secondary school, library, club and a medical center in the village. It has a population of 1,499.

== Etymology ==
The village is so called because it built near the irrigation ditch named Daşarx (Dasharkh), and slightly above. And irrigation ditch is so called because it was built from the stony and rocky area. The name made out from the component of the words of daş (stone) and arx (ditch, aryk) means "the irrigation ditch from stone".
