= Muğanlı (Şıxbabalı), Agdam =

Mughanly
- Azerbaijani: Muğanlı
- Location within Azerbaijan Location within Karabakh Economic Region
- Coordinates: 39°56′35″N 46°56′14″E
- Country: Azerbaijan
- Rayon: Agdam
- Time zone: UTC+4 (AZT)
  - Summer (DST): UTC+5 (AZT)

Muğanlı (also called Mughanly) is a village in the Agdam District of Azerbaijan.
