= Nakhchivan State University =

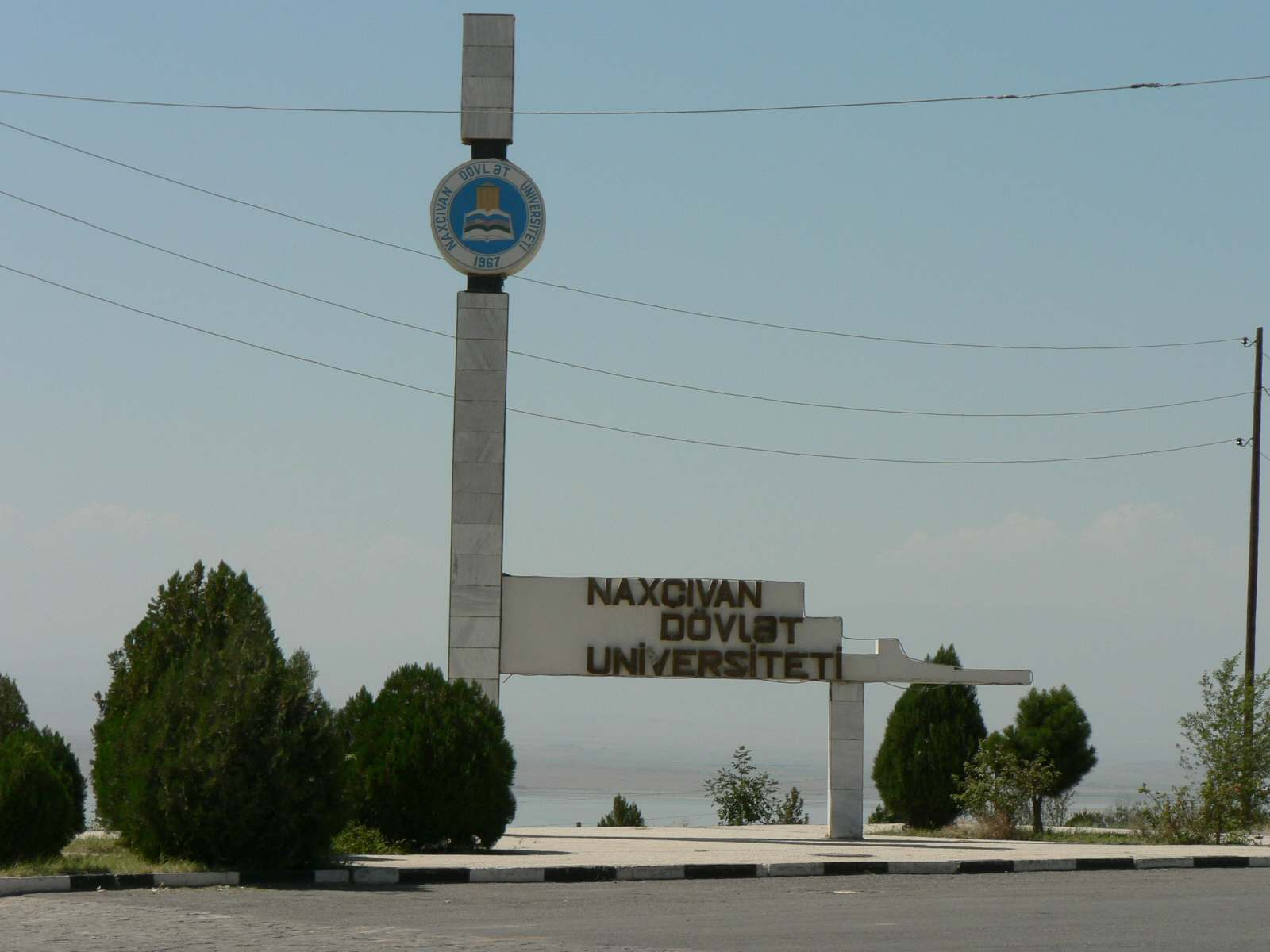
Nakhchivan State University sign, 2006.

Nakhchivan State University (NSU) (Azerbaijani: Naxçıvan Dövlət Universiteti) is a public university located in Nakhchivan Autonomous Republic, Azerbaijan. Founded in 1967 as a part of the Azerbaijan Pedagogical Institute, in 1990 it became the Nakhchivan State University. It has 703 faculty members and currently enrolls 35,000 students. In 2003, NSU, in conjunction with George Soros' Open Society Institute - Assistance Foundation opened an Education-Information Center on the NSU campus to develop areas involving education, information and law.

== History ==
Nakhchivan branch of Azerbaijan Pedagogical University was founded in 1967. Only 102 students were permitted to tuition. Back then, only 3 people were employed in Nakhchivan branch.

In 1972 Nakhchivan's branch became independent, and in 1990 transformed into Nakhchivan state university.

According to the decree of the ex-president of Azerbaijan Heydar Aliyev, the university received a status of self-government and independence in 2002.

=== Affiliations ===
Building on Nakhchivan State University's campus

The university is a member of the Caucasus University Association.

NSU also affiliates with 3 international projects within the TEMPUS program. Starting from 2012 NSU affiliates with Erasmus-Mundus international program. NSU is a member of the Association of Asian Universities, the Union of Universities of the Caucasus region, Club of European Rectors, the Union of Universities of the Black Sea basin countries.

== Awards and international activity ==
For the active development of international relations, success in the field of science and education, Nakhchivan State University has been awarded the title of the “Millennium University” by the Club of European Rectors.

The team of the University Student Free Business Association as a champion of Azerbaijan in 2010 took part in world championships in the US in 2010 and in Malaysia in 2011.

Play which was set by the University of the Operetta's students, "Arshin Mal Alan" was successfully shown in Novosibirsk (Russia), in Erzurum, Samsun, Kars, Ardahan, the Black Sea Technical University (Turkey), in Akhaltekhinsky University (Georgia). The University football team, becoming in 2008 and 2010 the country's champion among university teams, represented our country in Ukraine and Poland.
