= Sharur District =

District of Nakhchivan Autonomous Republic in Azerbaijan

Coordinates: 39°33′N 45°04′E

- District
- Map of Azerbaijan showing Sharur District
- Country: Azerbaijan
- Autonomous Republic: Nakhchivan
- Established: 8 August 1930
- Capital: Sharur
- Settlements: 66

Government
  - Governor: Kəmal Jafarov

Area
  - Total: 870 km^{2} (340 sq mi)

Population (2020)
  - Total: 117,600
  - Density: 140/km^{2} (350/sq mi)
- Time zone: UTC+4 (AZT)
- Postal code: 6800
- Website: serur-ih.nakhchivan.az

Sharur District (Azerbaijani: Şərur rayonu) is one of the 7 districts of the Nakhchivan Autonomous Republic of Azerbaijan. The district borders the districts of Kangarli, Sadarak, as well as the Vayots Dzor and Ararat provinces of Armenia and the West Azerbaijan Province of Iran. Its capital and largest city is Sharur. As of 2020, the district had a population of 117,600.

== Etymology ==
The district was renamed to Norashen from 1930 to 1964, then Ilich or Ilichyovsk from 1964 to 1991 in honour of Vladimir Ilich Lenin. It was finally renamed to its original name Sharur upon the dissolution of the Soviet Union and the independence of Azerbaijan.

== History ==
Following the disestablishment of the Nakhichevan Khanate upon the region's annexation into the Russian Empire in 1828, the Sharur area was included into the Nakhichevan Uyezd of the Armenian Oblast, and later, the Erivan Governorate. In 1870, the Sharur and Daralayaz mahals of the Nakhichevan district were detached into a separate district, becoming known as the Sharur-Daralayaz Uyezd. According to the Russian Empire Census of 1897, the area of Sharur Daralayaz district, the centre of which is now Jalilkend, is 29,723 sq.m. km, the population was 76,551 people. The population of Sharur-Daralayaz district, which borders Iran and Turkey, was mainly engaged in agriculture, horticulture, viticulture, cotton growing and beekeeping.

After the brief independence of Armenia and Azerbaijan in 1918–1920, the Sharur area—which was mostly under the control of the local Azerbaijanis—was assigned to the Nakhichevan ASSR within the Azerbaijan SSR. On 8 August 1930, the Sharur Uyezd of Nakhichevan was reorganised into the Norashen raion. On 28 February 1991, the former name of the territory, Sharur, was restored to the district. In its current form, the Sharur District is bordered by the Vayots Dzor and Ararat provinces of Armenia to the northeast and the West Azerbaijan Province of Iran to the southwest. The administrative center of the district is the city of Sharur.

== Historical monuments ==
Sharur is one of the most ancient and the largest settlements of the Autonomous Republic of Nakhchivan. The favourable geographical position of Sharur created conditions for the settlement of people in ancient times. The researches showed that the people settled in the area in the late glacial period. The territory of Sharur with its full water rivers, fertile soils were favourable for the development of plant-growing. The historical researches defined the settlement of the people in Sharur before Christ. The archaeological excavations on the territory of Sharur which is mentioned as Sharuk in the epos of "The Book of Dede Korkut" dating back to the period 1300 ago revealed the settlement and burial places of the Neolithic, Bronze Age as well as Antique period. The settlement Oghlangaya covering an area of 40 hectares of the Garatepe Mountain of the region dates back to the 2-1st millenniums B.C. The region accounts for a number of archaeological monuments and settlements rich in the patterns of material culture reflecting the activity and lifestyle of ancient people. These are the ancient, settlement, towers, cemeteries, Kurgans and architectural monuments. The researches of 1980-1990 revealed the cultural remnants of the dug cave of the Stone Age including a great many instruments made of stone and wine-tree. The monuments of the mid Bronze Age was revealed in the Araz River, Arpachay and its branches (Shortepe, Kheledj mountain, Kultepe, Djennettepe and others).

== Population ==
According to the State Statistics Committee, as of 2018, the population of city recorded 115,600 persons, which increased by 3,500 persons (about 3 percent) from 112,100 persons in 2000. Of the population, 57,400 are men and 58,200 are women. More than 27 percent of the population (about 31,500 persons) consists of young people and teenagers aged 14–29.

Population of the district by the year (at the beginning of the year, thsd. persons)
Region	2000	2001	2002	2003	2004	2005	2006	2007	2008	2009	2010	2011	2012	2013	2014	2015	2016	2017	2018
Sharur region	112,1	113,5	114,5	115,6	96,7	97,3	98,5	99,6	100,9	102,1	103,3	105,4	107,4	109,4	111,2	112,3	113,4	114,6	115,6
urban population	6,7	6,7	6,7	6,7	6,7	6,7	6,8	6,7	6,8	6,7	6,7	6,7	6,9	7,0	7,1	7,2	7,2	7,3	7,3
rural population	105,4	106,8	107,8	108,9	90,0	90,6	91,7	92,9	94,1	95,4	96,6	98,7	100,5	102,4	104,1	105,1	106,2	107,3	108,3
