= List of Azerbaijani actors =

This is a list of notable Azerbaijani actors, which is arranged alphabetically.

== A ==
- Aliagha Aghayev
- Lutfali Abdullayev
- Telman Adigozalov
- Ahmed Agdamski
- Alasgar Alakbarov
- Mirzaagha Aliyev
- Huseyn Arablinski

== B ==
- Mirza Babayev
- Shamsi Badalbeyli
- Rasim Balayev
- Afag Bashirgyzy
- Rashid Behbudov
- Polad Bülbüloğlu

== D ==
- Marziyya Davudova

== G ==
- Fatma Gadri
- Aghasadyg Garaybeyli
- Govhar Gaziyeva

== H ==
- Alakbar Huseynov

== J ==
- Javanshir Hadiyev

== K ==
- Munavvar Kalantarli
- Zulfiyya Khanbabayeva

== M ==
- Hasan Mammadov
- Fakhraddin Manafov
- Elchin Musaoglu

== O ==
- Hamida Omarova

== R ==
- Ulvi Rajab
- Hagigat Rzayeva

== S ==
- Huseynagha Sadigov
- Latif Safarov
- Huseyngulu Sarabski
- Barat Shakinskaya
- Abbas Mirza Sharifzadeh

== T ==
- Rza Tahmasib
- Jahan Talyshinskaya
- Pamphylia Tanailidi
- Hasanagha Turabov

== Z ==
- Nasiba Zeynalova

== See also ==
- Lists of actors
- List of Azerbaijani film directors
- List of Azerbaijani film producers
- List of Azerbaijanis
