= Garay Alibayov =

- Born: March 29, 1955 (age 71); Dədəli, Fuzuli District, Azerbaijan
- Education: Azerbaijan State Institute of Arts
- Occupations: Actor and film producer
- Spouse: Kainat İbrahimova
- Children: 2

Garay Alibayov (born 29 March 1955) is an Azerbaijani actor and film producer. He served as chairman of the Public Council under the Ministry of Culture of Azerbaijan.

== Early life and education ==
Alibayov was born in the village of Dədəli, Fuzuli District, Azerbaijan Soviet Socialist Republic. He completed eight years of schooling in his native village before attending Bünyad Sərdarov School in Fuzuli District. From 1973 to 1977, he studied at the Azerbaijan State Institute of Arts.

== Career ==
=== Acting and film production ===
Alibayov worked as an actor at the Sumgayit State Theater and appeared in the films Tütək səsi (1976), Sevinc buxtası (1977) and Gözlə məni (1980). In 1985, he performed in Qanlı zəmi. He later became director of the Ulus Film Producer Centre. He participated in presentations of the film Cavad xan in Budapest (2010) and New York (2014). In 2019, he produced the film Qısa ömrün uzun yolu, which was filmed by Bay Film studio.

=== Other work ===
From 1986 to 1988, Alibayov served as director of the Veteran Club and from 1988 to 1990, he was deputy director of the Araz Cinema. In 1990, he was appointed as director of the Araz Cinema, serving until 1993. From 1988 to 1993, he also served as director of Sinema, a small state enterprise. In 1996, he became president of the company Elshad K, serving until 2000.

Since 2005, Alibayov has been a member of the Aristocrats' Assembly of the Republic of Azerbaijan, holding Certificate No. 565.

He has been chairman of the Cultural Development Center Public Union since 2007 and editor-in-chief of the Simurg.info website since 2017.

Alibayov also served as chairman of the Public Council under the Ministry of Culture of the Republic of Azerbaijan.

== Personal life ==
Garay Alibayov with Jamil Alibekov

Alibayov is a nephew of the writer Jamil Alibekov. Alibayov has two children, Kanan Alibayov and Sanan Alibayov.

== Filmography ==
Year	Title	Director	Ref(s)
1976	Tütək səsi	Rasim Ojagov	
1977	Sevinc buxtası	Eldar Quliyev	
1980	Gözlə məni	Kamil Rüstəmbəyov	
1985	Qanlı zəmi	Hasanaga Turabov and Abdul Mahmudov	
