= Malik Dadashov =

Azerbaijani actor (1924–1996)

- Azerbaijani: Məlik Dadaşov
- Born: June 7, 1924; Baku, Azerbaijan SSR, Soviet Union
- Died: December 2, 1996 (aged 72); Baku, Azerbaijan
- Citizenship: Soviet Union; Azerbaijan
- Education: Azerbaijan State University of Culture and Arts
- Occupation: Actor
- Years active: 1951—1996
- Spouse: Sofia Huseynova
- Children: Rafael Dadashov
- Awards: People's Artist of the Azerbaijan SSR

Malik Yusif oghlu Dadashov (Azerbaijani: Məlik Yusif oğlu Dadaşov; 7 June 1924 — 2 December 1996) was an Azerbaijani actor and People's Artist of the Azerbaijan SSR.

== Biography ==
Malik Dadashov was born on June 7, 1924, in Baku. His first education was in the field of medicine. He left his first education uncompleted for the Great Patriotic War. Due to the contusion he received in 1943, he was returned and was treated for a long time. After treatment, he worked as a musician in military units. After returning from the war in 1945, Malik Dadashov went to Azerbaijan State Theatre of Young Spectators and was hired as an actor there. Then he graduated from Theatrical Institute named after Mirzaagha Aliyev in 1950. M.Dadashov started to work at Azerbaijan State Academic National Drama Theatre after graduated. At that time on the stage of Azerbaijani theatre Alasgar Alakbarov, Mehdi Mammadov, Adil Isgandarov and other corifeys worked.

His arrival on the stage coincided with 1946. Started his performances in a newly opened theater in Zaqatala. The 23-year-old actor played a leading role in the Zaqatala theater, and the main female characters were played by a young actress named Sofia Huseynova. Rafael Dadashov was born from this marriage in 1946. Melik Dadashov had two more marriages. He had a son and 3 daughters.

His first role in the film is in "Leyli and Majnun" by Latif Safarov based on Anvar Mammadkhanli's script in 1961. His most famous role is Gamlo in "The Last Pass" movie. In 1985, Malik Dadashov starred in the film "The Interviewer", co-produced by Azerbaijanfilm and Belarusfilm. In the film about Anatoli Kawaleznik, who was poisoned in Pakistan for political reasons, Malik Dadashov creates the image of Niaz Khan, the country's counter-intelligence commissioner.

M.Dadashov was awarded the title of People's Artist of the Azerbaijan SSR in 1974.

The actor died on December 2, 1996, in Baku.

== Family ==
Malik Dadashov was brother of Salman Dadashov, father of Rafael Dadashov. He is also Hokuma Najafova's sister's son and uncle of Brilliant Dadashova.

== Filmography ==
Year	Film	Role
1957	Two People from a Neighborhood	Nazif
1959	The Secret of a Tower	Darvish
1960	Koroghlu	Bolu Bey
1961	Layla and Majnun	Warrior
1966	26 Baku Commissars	Azizbekov
1968	The Last Night of Childhood	Naghiyev
1969	Crazy Kura	Molla Sadig
1971	The Last Pass	Gamlo
1971	The Stars Do Not Go Out	
1978	The Atayevs Family	Khosrov Atayev
1981	The Day After Tomorrow, Midnight	Nariman Narimanov
1988	The Scoundrel	Molla
1993	The Scream	Armen Khachaturyants
1993	Tahmina	Murtuz
2002	Shooting is Postponed!	Inspector
