= Forgive Me If I Die =

1989 film by Rasim Ojagov

- Ölsəm... bağışla
- Directed by: Rasim Ojagov
- Written by: Rustam Ibragimbekov
- Produced by: Ramiz Aliyev
- Starring: Fakhraddin Manafov; Gulzar Gurbanova; Sadaya Mustafayeva; Mukhtar Maniyev
- Music by: Emin Sabitoglu
- Layouts by: Rafiz İsmailov
- Color process: Black and white (with coloured episodes)
- Production company: Azerbaijanfilm
- Release date: October 24, 1989
- Running time: 87 minutes
- Countries: Azerbaijan SSR, Soviet Union
- Language: Russian (dubbed in Azerbaijani)

Forgive Me If I Die (Azerbaijani: Ölsəm... bağışla; Russian: Храм воздуха) is a 1989 Soviet-Azerbaijani romantic drama film about love and death directed by Rasim Ojagov, written by Rustam Ibragimbekov, and starring Fakhraddin Manafov, Gulzar Gurbanova, Sadaya Mustafayeva and Mukhtar Maniyev. The film narrates the life story of Yusif, a man who got a contusion during the Second World War, deserted the army prior to the end of the war, arrested because of that, and saw his girlfriend married to another man.

== Cast ==
- Fakhraddin Manafov as Yusif
- Gulzar Gurbanova as Gulya
- Sadaya Mustafayeva as Yusif′s mother
- Mukhtar Maniyev as Seyidrza
- Nizami Musayev as Javad
- Agasef Sadigbeyov as Eldar
- Ulker Guliyeva as Naza
- Victor Demirtaş as Edick
- Andrei Prokhorov as Victor
- Rasmi Jabrayilov as a doctor
- Andrei Yurenev as an inspector
- Galina Kuznetsova as a landlady
- Maria Stepanova as Aunt Marusya
- Yelena Kostina as Zina
- Hasan Mammadov as Firuz
- Haji İsmayilov as Gulam
- Aliya Musayeva as Zulya
- Zulfugar Baratzade as Baladadash
- Niyazi Ahmadov as Selim
- Tofig Ismayilov as a director
- Nuriyya Ahmadova as Saltanat
- Valiahd Valiyev as a slacker
- Kamil Maharramov as a gun dealer
- Boka as a singer in restaurant

== Production ==
The movie was shot in Baku and Kislovodsk in 1989.
