= Anecdote (film) =

- Directed by: Yefim Abramov; Nizami Musayev
- Written by: Rovshan Aghayev; Yefim Abramov; Nizami Musayev
- Starring: Rasim Balayev; Jeyhun Mirzayev; Yashar Nuri
- Edited by: Ramiz Fataliyev; Nusret Kesemenli
- Production company: Azerbaijanfilm
- Release date: 1989
- Running time: 136 minutes
- Country: Soviet Union
- Languages: Azerbaijani, Russian

The Anecdote (Azerbaijani: Lətifə, Russian: Анекдот) is a full-length Azerbaijani film shot in Baku in 1989. Made in the tragic comedy genre, this film is about the dysfunctional Soviet management system in Azerbaijan SSR at the end of 1980s and about the decadence and corruption of the Soviet bureaucracy.

== Reception ==
- Alieva, Narmina (2007-08-23). Фильм "Анекдот" был продан на рынке за 2,5 миллиона рублей (in Russian). Novosti-Azerbaijan.

== Cast ==
- Rasim Balayev - Rahimov
- Jeyhun Mirzayev - Mammadov
- Yashar Nuri - Mammad
- Mukhtar Maniyev - Kerimov
- Khuraman Hajiyeva - Khalilova
- Yelena Kostina - Alya
- Alexander Sharovski - Prosecutor
- Loghman Kerimov - The Deaf
- Latifa Aliyeva - Mother
- Lala Baghirova - Rimma
- Azhdar Hamidov - Ahmed
- Rafig Aliyev - Komsomol leader
- Arif Kerimov - Murtuzov
- Nizami Musayev - Dunyaminov
- Sadig Huseynov - Retired Colonel
- Tarlan Babayev - Dancer
- Ogtay Suleymanov - Factor worker
- Sahib Guluzade - Head of the Society
- Alla Sannikova - A dwarf lady
- Igor Sannikov - A dwarf man
- Alim Aslanov - Colonel Nazarov
- Dadash Kazimov - Elevator Man
- Faig Babayev - Factory Director

== See also ==
- Azerbaijani films of the 1980s
