= Interrogation (1980 film) =

- Directed by: Rustam Ibragimbekov; Rasim Ojagov
- Written by: Rustam Ibragimbekov
- Starring: Alexander Kalyagin; Hasan Memmedov; Shafiga Mammadova; Elena Prudnikova; Rasim Balayev
- Cinematography: Rafiq Gambarov
- Music by: Emin Sabitoglu
- Production company: Azerbaijanfilm
- Release date: 1980
- Running time: 86 minutes
- Country: Soviet Union
- Language: Russian

Interrogation (Azerbaijani: İstintaq, Russian: Допрос, romanized: Dopros) is a 1980 Soviet crime drama film directed by Rustam Ibragimbekov and Rasim Ojagov. The film premiered in April 1980 in Moscow.

== Plot ==
Investigator Seifi Ganiev runs the case of an illegal mercery shop's head Murad Abiyev, who confessed to embezzlement of one million roubles from public funds.

Abiyev is also accused of the murder of an underage girl that occurred in Riga shortly after Abiyev saw her. He denies his guilt, but does not name the perpetrators though he knows them, even though he is facing the death penalty.

The investigator understands that some high-ranking officials stand behind Abiyev, but he has no proof.

Ganiev seeks to obtain from the prisoner the whole truth to bring the criminals to justice.

== Cast ==
- Alexander Kalyagin as Captain Seifi Ganiev
- Hasan Memmedov as Murad Abiev (voiced by Vyacheslav Tikhonov)
- Shafiga Mammadova as Gülya Ganieva
- Elena Prudnikova as Ayan Abieva
- Rasim Balayev as Police Colonel Elmar
- Tofig Mirzoyev as Teymur
- Hasanagha Turabov as General
- Elkhan Agaguseynov as Dadashev
- Yevgeni Lebedev as Abiev's prison cell mate
- Gumrakh Rakhimov as Policeman

== Awards ==
- 1980 - 13th All-Union Film Festival: Grand Prize in the feature film section.
