= My Seven Sons =

- Directed by: Tofig Tagizadeh
- Written by: Yusif Samedoglu
- Produced by: Azerbaijanfilm
- Starring: Hasan Mammadov, Anvar Hasanov, Hasanagha Turabov
- Cinematography: Rasim Ismayilov
- Music by: Khayyam Mirzazadeh
- Production company: Azerbaijanfilm
- Release date: 1970
- Running time: 90 min.
- Country: Soviet Union
- Languages: Azerbaijani, Russian

My Seven Sons (Azerbaijani: Yeddi oğul istərəm) is a 1970 Soviet drama film. The film plot is written by Yusif Samedoglu based on his father poet Samed Vurgun's The Komsomol Poem which is about the events of the 1920s and the Soviet overtaking of Azerbaijan.

The film's title derives from Azerbaijani folklore clause yeddi oğul istərəm, bircə dənə qız gəlin (meaning "I'd like seven sons and just one daughter"), usually said during the weddings, when the groom comes to the bride's house to pick her up. The film was shot for the 50th anniversary of the establishment of Soviet power in Azerbaijan.

This lyrical psychological film is about commitment to the Bolshevik revolution and its victory. The story is about seven youth who sacrifice everything for the good of people.

== Plot ==
The story is set in Azerbaijan in 1920. Seven young communists, led by Bakhtiyar (played by Hasan Mammadov), are sent by the revolutionary committee to the remote village of Peykanli. This village is under the control of Keraj bej (Hasanagha Turabov), a powerful landowner who refuses to submit to the new Soviet government and actively resists it. Amid the struggle between the communists and the forces loyal to Keraj bej, a tragic love story unfolds between Jalal (Enver Hasanov), a communist poet, and Humay (Zemfira Ismayilova), the daughter of Keraj bej. Humay returns Jalal’s love, but she feels unable to defy her father’s will.

Jalal confronts Keraj bej, openly admitting that they remain enemies while also confessing his love for Humay. In response, Keraj bej kills Jalal with his own hands. Devastated by the news of her beloved’s death, Humay dies of grief. Ultimately, five of the seven communists are killed in the ongoing conflict, and Bakhtiyar, the last survivor, leaves for a new mission, accompanied by six young villagers from Peykanli who are inspired to carry on the work of the fallen communists. They travel through the villages during the takeover of Azerbaijan by Bolsheviks in order to establish and strengthen the Soviet power. Events develop in Peykanli village.

== Cast ==
- Hasan Mammadov as Bakhtiyar
- Anvar Hasanov as Jalal
- Elchin Mammadov as Mirpasha
- Abdul Mahmudov as Gasim
- Shahmar Alakbarov as Gazanfar
- Rafig Azimov as Shahsuvar
- Alasgar Ibrahimov as Zalimoglu
- Hasanagha Turabov as Keraj bej
- Ismayil Osmanli as Kalantar
- Zemfira Ismayilova as Humay
- Hamlet Khanizadeh as Gizir

== See also ==
- Azerbaijani films of the 1970s
