= List of Azerbaijani film directors =

This is a list of notable Azerbaijani film directors, which is arranged alphabetically.

== B ==
- Arif Babayev

== I ==
- Rustam Ibragimbekov

== K ==
- Farman Karimzade

== M ==
- Elchin Musaoglu

== O ==
- Rasim Ojagov

== R ==
- Anar Rzayev

== S ==
- Latif Safarov
- Hasan Seyidbeyli
- Huseyn Seyidzadeh
- Abbas Mirza Sharifzadeh

== T ==
- Rza Tahmasib

== See also ==
- List of film directors by name
- List of Azerbaijani film producers
- List of Azerbaijani actors
- List of Azerbaijanis
