= Ataya Aliyeva =

Azerbaijani actress (1920–1995)

- Ətayə Əliyeva
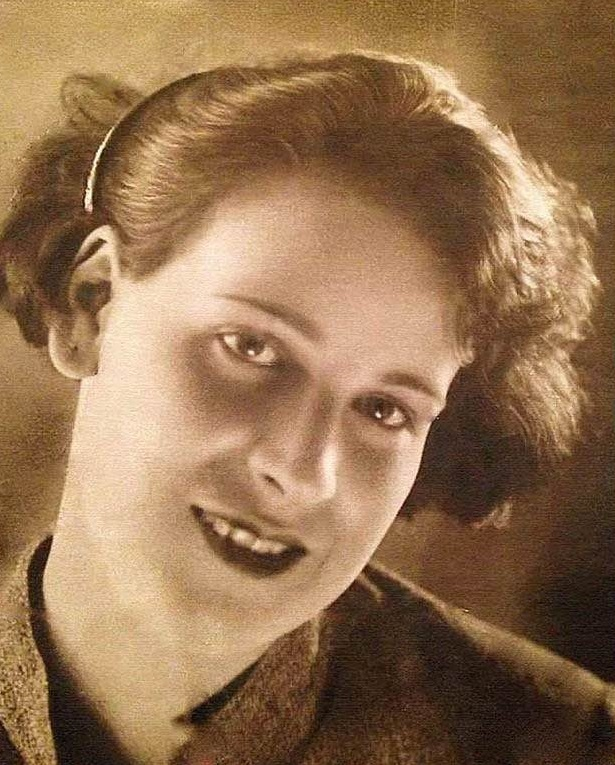
- Born: May 2, 1920; Ashgabat, Transcaspian Oblast, Turkestan Autonomous Soviet Socialist Republic
- Died: April 6, 1995 (aged 74); Baku, Azerbaijan
- Resting place: Yasamal cemetery
- Education: Baku Theater Technical School
- Occupation: actress
- Years active: 1936-1995
- Children: Rauf Mirzayev; Ramiz Hasanoglu
- Awards: Honored Artist of the Azerbaijan SSR

Ataya Gulam gizi Aliyeva (Azerbaijani: Ətayə Qulam qızı Əliyeva; 1920 – 1995) was an Azerbaijani theater and film actress, and a Honored Artist of the Azerbaijan SSR (1964). She appeared in numerous films made in Azerbaijan.

== Biography ==
Ataya Aliyeva was born on May 2, 1920, in Poltoratsk. She began her stage career as an amateur. Her first performance was in 1933 at the Ashgabat Musical Drama Theater, directed by Rza Afganli, where she played the role of Garib's sister in "Ashik Qarib." She received specialized education at the Baku Theater Technical School, where she participated in several roles in a drama club thanks to the initiative of Fatma Gadri. In 1934, as a first-year student at the technical school, Aliyeva was invited to the Azerbaijan State Academic National Drama Theatre. In 1936, she went to Yerevan with a group of actors from the theater and worked at the Yerevan state Azerbaijan dramatic theater for ten years. At the Yerevan theater, she created numerous stage characters in both national and foreign productions.

In 1938, she moved to Baku with her family, and two years later, they returned to Yerevan again. In the 1948–1949 theater season, Aliyeva was invited to the Ganja Drama Theater and she worked there for 7 years.

Her stage work is closely associated with the works of Jafar Jabbarly. Her roles as Sevil and Dilber, Yagut and Tanya, Sona and Solmaz (at the Yerevan theater), and Almaz, Sara, and Gultekin (at the Ganja theater) provided her with a significant foundation for her acting career.

In 1956, Ataya Aliyeva returned to the Azerbaijan State Academic Drama Theater. There, she performed in productions of classic and contemporary Azerbaijani playwrights, as well as translated works. Some of her notable roles in her later years include Peri (Peri Jadu), Sona (Haji Gara), Fatmanise (The Dead), Valide (Ilich Cove), Nezakat (You Are Always with Me), Rafiga (Lie), and Melahat (Second Voice), among many other stage characters.

Aliyeva performed many roles on radio, television, and in films. In the "Azerbaijanfilm" studio's production of "Our Street," she played the role of "aunt Beyim"; in "Battle in the Mountains," she portrayed "mother"; in "The Telephone Operator Girl," she was "Simuzar"; and in "Last Night of Childhood," she took on the role of "Mansura." In the 1959 film "Can He Be Forgiven?" directed by Rza Tahmasib, she appeared in two roles: "Lieutenant Garayeva" and "aunt Sara."

Ataya Aliyeva died on April 6, 1995, in Baku. She was buried in the Yasamal cemetery.

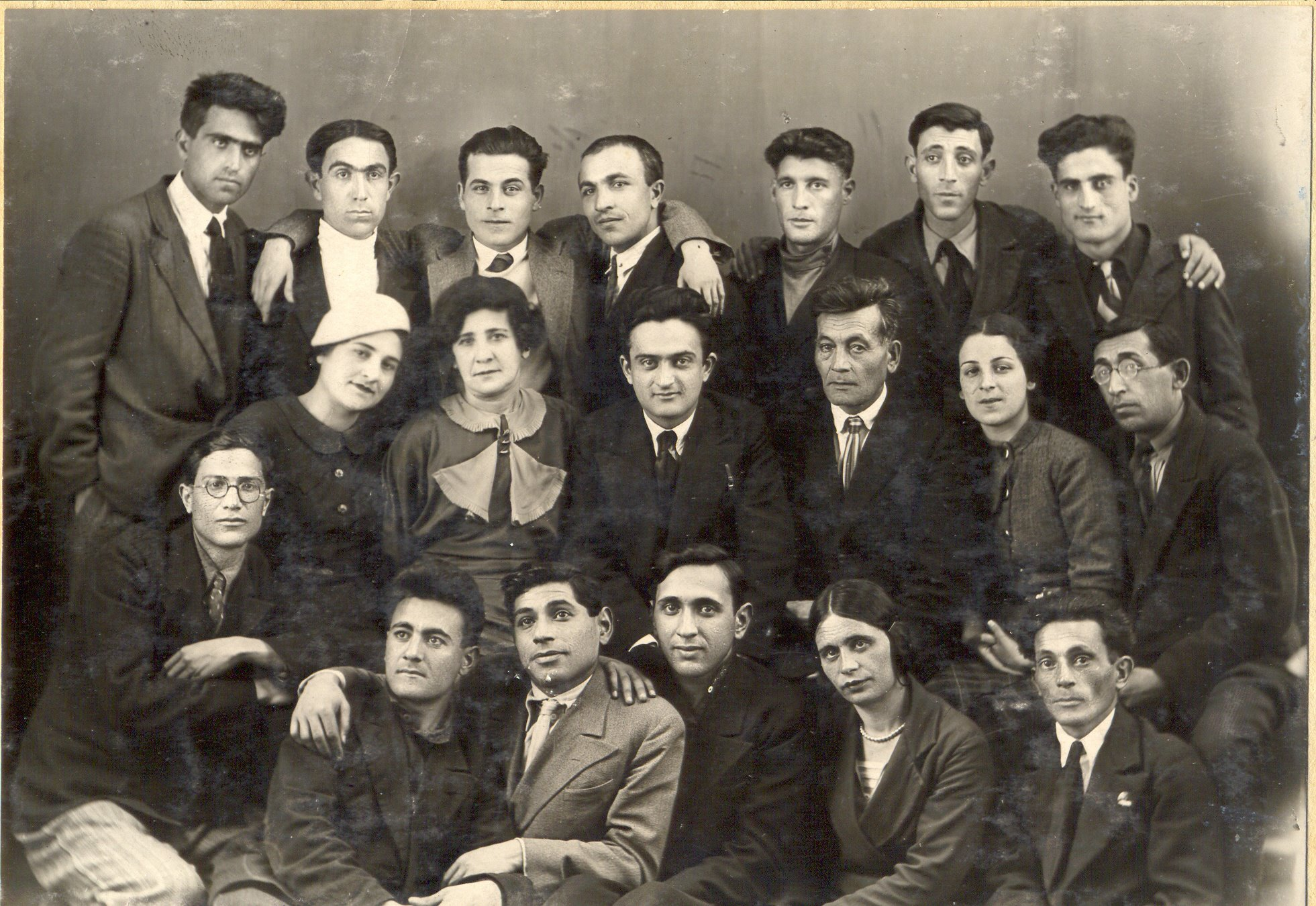
Ataya Aliyeva (2nd from the right in the middle row) with the creative team of the Yerevan state Azerbaijan dramatic theater, 1937."

== Family ==
Ataya Aliyeva’s father, Aghagulam, was from Maragheh, and her mother, Humay khanim, was from Tabriz. They had six children.

Ataya married actor Hasanoghlu Mirzayev, and they had three children. She is the mother of directors Ramiz Hasanoglu and Rauf Suleyman.

== Awards ==
- On June 29, 1964, she was honored with the title of "Honored Artist of the Azerbaijan SSR.

== Filmography ==
- Mothers
- The Cloth Peddler (1965 film)
- In A Southern City
- Our Street
- Battle In The Mountains
- Real Friend
- General
- The Day Passed
- A Person Settles
- Infrant
- In The Name Of The Law
- Dark-complexioned Girl (film)
- But, I Was Not Beautiful
- Can He Be Forgiven?
- Romeo Is My Neighbour
- We Invite You To A Small Wedding Reception
- Surprise
- The Telephone Operator Girl
- Lame Teymur
- Earth. Sea. Fire. Sky
- The Last Night of Childhood
- The Woolen Shawl
