= Turabov =

Turabov is a surname. Notable people with the surname include:

- Eltun Turabov (born 1997), Azerbaijani footballer
- Hasanagha Turabov (1938–2003), Azerbaijani and Soviet actor
