= Abdul Mahmudov =

- Born: 15 May 1944; Hajigabul district, Azerbaijan SSR, Soviet Union
- Title: People`s Artist of Azerbaijan

Abdul Mahmudov – Azerbaijani screenwriter, assistant director, and film director. He is also known as Haji Sheikh Abdul Mahmudbekov. People's Artist of Azerbaijan (2018).

== Life ==
Originally from Shamakhi, Abdul Mahmudov was born on May 15, 1944, in the village of Atbulag of Hajigabul district. As his mother's side was from the Hashemite Kingdom, his descendants have been called Hashimans. His father's side was from Ardabil.

Abdul graduated from high school in 1961. His cinema career began with the films "Two people from one neighborhood" and "Leyli and Majnun" in which he took part in his childhood. Between 1962 and 1966, he studied at the Azerbaijan State Institute of Art named M.A. Aliyev. In 1971 he attended the faculty of director of the Academy of Fine Arts and Screenwriters in Moscow and was taught by outstanding actors Andrey Tarkovski, Leonid Trauberq, Vasily Shukshin and Georgiy Daneliya.

== Awards ==
- State Prize
- Honored Worker of Art
- On August 1, 2018, he was awarded the honorary title of People's Artist.

== Activity ==
Actor and film director Abdul Mahmudov is known to the broad masses for his role in the popular Azerbaijani revolutionary action film “My seven sons”. Since 1966 he has worked as an actor at the Azerbaijanfilm studio. He was an artistic director of the cinema-actor theater. The films which he directed and starred in are as follows:

- "Bizim Jabish muallim" (film, 1969) (second director)
- "Dali Kur" (film, 1969) (second director)
- "Firangiz" (film, 1975)
- "Ajami Nakhchivani" (film, 1976)
- "The buyer's adventure" (film, 1976)
- "Unusual hunting" (film, 1976)
- "Face to the Wind" (film, 1977)
- "Friendship of the cities" (film, 1978)
- "The Meaning of Life" (film, 1979)
- "Wait for me" (film, 1980) second director
- "Exchange" (film, 1983)
- "Worthy Candidate" (film, 1984)
- "Successful destination" (film, 1984)
- "Bloody Land" (film, 1985)
- "Double Non-Farming" (film, 1985)
- "Urban Riders" (film, 1986)
- "Closed Doors" (film, 1986)
- "The native coasts" (film, 1989)
- "Murder on Night Train" (film, 1990)
- "Additional Impact" (film, 2010)

== See also ==
- List of Azerbaijani actors
- List of Azerbaijani film producers
- List of Azerbaijani film directors
