= Alibekov =

Alibekov is a surname. Notable people with the surname include:

- Akhmed Alibekov (born 1998), Ukrainian footballer
- Jamil Alibekov (1927–2014), Azerbaijani writer
- Ken Alibek (born 1950), Soviet physician, microbiologist and biological warfare expert
- Mutalip Alibekov (born 1997), Russian footballer
- Omargadzhi Alibekov (born 1996), Russian footballer
