= The Last Night of Childhood =

- Directed by: Arif Babayev
- Written by: Magsud Ibrahimbeyov
- Music by: Polad Bülbüloğlu
- Production company: Azerbaijanfilm
- Release date: 1968
- Running time: 89 minutes
- Country: Soviet Union
- Languages: Azerbaijani; Russian

The Last Night of Childhood (Azerbaijani: Uşaqlığın son gecəsi) is a Soviet film of 1968 by Azerbaijani director Arif Babayev produced by the film studio Azerbaijanfilm. The film is based on the story of the same name by Magsud Ibrahimbeyov, published in the same year. The film premiered on January 26, 1970, in Moscow.

== Plot ==
Murad and Rustam are cousins. Murad just finished school. However, he failed to enter the institute. Rustam, who just graduated from the institute, works as a construction foreman at a meat processing plant. He arranges Murad there as ordinary workers. But it soon becomes clear that not everything is going smoothly at the meat processing plant. The fact is that the foreman of the night shift Rufat secretly steals meat with his accomplices at night. One night Murad sees it. But Rufat threatens Murad and he promises not to tell anyone. Rustam is soon appointed head of the night shift. Rufat understands that such a replacement can ruin everything for them. Then he resorts to the help of his accomplice Elya. Knowing that Rustam has feelings for her, he asks her to steal the keys to the warehouse from Rustam. However, Murad tells everything to Rustam. They find Rufat at the crime scene...

== Cast ==
- Anvar Hasanov — Murad
- Sayavush Shafiyev — Rustam
- Ataya Aliyeva — Mansoura
- Torekhanim Zeynalova - grandmother
- Alakbar Seyfi — Ismayil
- Khosrov Abdullayev — Majnun
- Tofig Mirzoyev — Rufat
- Megi Kejeradze - Elya
- Gorkhmaz Atakishiyev — Zaur
- Mammadsadiq Nuriyev — Davud
- Insaf Mammadova — Sevda
- Yusif Valiyev — senior executive
- Rafik Taghiyev — driver
- Malik Dadashov — Nagiyev
- Mukhtar Maniyev — Tahir

== Awards ==
In 1969, at the III Film Festival of the Republics of Transcaucasia and Ukraine in Kyiv, the film was noted as the best for children and youth. Diplomas were also awarded to actor Anvar Hasanov and composer Polad Bulbul-ogly (for the best musical score for the film).

== Interesting facts ==
- The film is the first acting work of the People's Artist of Azerbaijan Samandar Rzayev (one of the two policemen at the very beginning of the film).
- According to the People's Artist of Azerbaijan Anvar Hasanov, many viewers remember him precisely for the role of Murad from this film, although this is the third film with the participation of a film actor.
