= Abbasgulu bey Shadlinski =

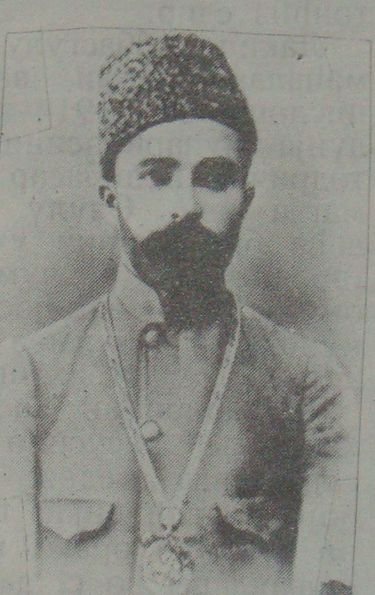
- Born: February 24, 1886; Boyuk Vedi village, Erivansky Uyezd, Erivan Governorate
- Died: 1930 Boyuk Vedi village, Erivansky Uyezd, Erivan Governorate
- Service years: 1920–1922
- Commands: "Red camp" partisan detachment
- Awards: Order of the Red Banner

Abbasgulu bey Khanbaba oglu Shadlinski (Azerbaijani: Abbasqulu bəy Şadlinski) was a Soviet military leader, revolutionary, and commander of a partisan detachment force called "Red camp", which played a significant role in establishment of the Soviet power in Armenia and Nakhchivan. The historian S.P.Aghayan called Shadlinski "the brave son of Azerbaijani people".

== Biography ==
He was born on February 24, 1886, in Boyuk Vedi village (now Vedi city) of Erivansky Uyezd of Erivan Governorate. He lost his father at an early age. In 1894, he studied at two-year Russo-Tatar school in his native village with the help of his mother, but he could not finish his education because of material problems. In 1902, he worked in a ground area, which he inherited from his father. The February Revolution of 1907 had a significant influence on the formation of Shadlinski's political thinking.

In 1918 and 1919 he commanded the self-defence forces of Vedi. against Dashnak detachments.

In autumn 1920, the "Red camp" partisan detachment, of which Shadlinski became the commander, and was distinguished during Civil War in Nakhchivan, was formed on the initiative of Nakhchivan communists. Initially the detachment consisted of 200 Azerbaijani soldiers, but later it filled with new forces of other nationalities.

It is noted that Turkish command authority repeatedly wanted to bring Abbasgulu bey and his friend Huseynov to trial. Atik Azizyan, leader of the Central Committee of the Communist Party of Armenia, writing about the reasons for Abbasgulu bey and his friend Huseynov's pursuit, noted, "The point is that these people foil plans of the Turkish Commanding Authority with their activity." Later he wrote that "Abbasgulu bey rendered the Soviet Authority great services" when the Soviet authority was established in Nakhchivan and that is why Abbasgulu bey aroused hatred of Turks ... "

Shadlinski, commander of the "Red Camp" detachment was conferred the Order of the Red Banner for his merits, which he showed in battles against the Dashnak authority. There were also 18 Azerbaijanis, including such commanders of companies as Ibrahim Farzaliyev, Alakbar Sadykhov, Museyib Akhundov, Fatulla Huseynov, Gafar Aliyev, Ibrahim Asgerov and Khalil Mehdiyev among the awarded ones.

Shadlinski stayed in Nakhchivan till the end of 1922, and led a guard of state borders. From 1922 to 1928, after he returned to Vedi, he worked in several industrial positions of the Armenian SSR, and later was appointed to the chairman of a cement mill in Davalu village.

He was killed by unknown person in 1930.

== Memory ==
Abbas gulu Gulu bey Shadlinski's image was shown in Farman Karimzade's Snowy pass novel. In 1971, Azerbaijanfilm film studio shot the Snowy pass film based on motifs of the novel. Hasan Mammadov played the role of Shadlinski.
