= List of Azerbaijani films of the 1980s =

A list of earliest films produced in Azerbaijan SSR ordered by year of release in the 1980s:

Films:1918–1990 see also List of Soviet films

== 1980s ==
Title	Director	Cast	Genre	Notes	
1980
Yol Ehvalati; The Roadside Story					Onun balali sevgisi Its ill-fated love
1981
Babamizin Babasinin Babasi; Our Great Great Grandfather					
1982
Nizami					
1983
Evlenmeek Isteyirem; I Want To Marry					
1984
Gumushgol Efsanesi; The Legend of Silver Lake					
1985
Qanli Zemi					
1986
Yay Gununun Xezan Yarpaqlari					
1987
Ozge Omur					
1988
Yaramaz; The Scoundrel					
1989
Olsem...Baghishla; Forgive Me If I Die					
Letife; Anecdote					
