= Khalilov =

Khalilov (Azerbaijani: Xəlilov, Russian: Халилов, Ukrainian: Халілов) is a masculine surname, its feminine counterpart is Khalilova. It is derived from the Arabic masculine given name Khalil. Notable people with the surname include:

- Erkin Khalilov (born 1955), Uzbekistani politician
- Farhad Khalilov (born 1946), Azerbaijani painter
- Imamaddin Khalilov (born 1998), Azerbaijani para taekwondo practitioner
- Mikhaylo Khalilov (born 1975), Ukrainian cyclist
- Ominakhon Khalilova (born 1998), Uzbek artistic gymnast
- Rappani Khalilov (1969–2007), Russian rebel
- Rauf Khalilov (born 1981), Azerbaijani film director
- Salahaddin Khalilov (born 1952), Azerbaijani philosopher
- Valery Khalilov (1952–2016), Russian musical composer and military band conductor
- Zahid Khalilov (1911–1974), Azerbaijani mathematician
