= Red Camp =

Red Camp may refer to:

- Howie Camp (1893–1960), American baseball outfielder nicknamed 'Red'
- Red Camp, a Soviet partisan detachment force led by Abbasgulu bey Shadlinski
