= Tofig Ismayilov =

Tofig Ismayilov is the name of:

- Tofig Ismayilov (film director) (1939–2016), Azerbaijani film director, screenwriter and film scholar
- Tofig Ismayilov (politician) (1933–1991), first Secretary of State of Azerbaijan

== See also ==
- Tofiq Ismayilov Stadium, a multi-use stadium in Surakhani, Baku, Azerbaijan
