= Leyla Shikhlinskaya =

Actress

Leila Farrukh gizi Shikhlinskaya (Azerbaijan Leyla Fәrrux qızı Şıxlinskaya, born December 27) is an Azerbaijani and Soviet actress, choreographer-teacher and professor. She earned a doctorate in art history, was awarded People's Artist of Azerbaijan. She was a member of the Union of Cinematographers of the USSR and the founder of the Leila Shikhlinskaya private clinic in Baku. She starred in such films as Arshin Mal Alan (1965, Gulchohra), The Day Passed (1971, Esmer) and Dede Gorgud (1975, Banu-Cicek).

== Early life ==
Shikhlinskaya was born in Moscow. Her nationality was Azerbaijani.

== Career ==
She authored more than 100 scientific articles.

Shikhlinskaya debuted in the role of Gyulchohra in Arshin Mal Alan, based on the eponymous operetta of Uzeir Hajibeyov. During this period she studied at the school and was engaged in ballet. Shikhlinskaya's partner at the trials, Rashid Behbudov (who played the protagonist in the film) was dissatisfied with the actress because of her height. For the role of Asmer, the main character of the film The Day Passed, actress Shafiga Mamedova was originally appointed, but she did not pass the screen test and Shikhlinskaya was selected.

Shikhlinskaya taught three disciplines at the Bolshoi Theater school. From 1990 to 1992 she was the choreographer of the Diaghilev ballet company. In 1992 Shikhlinskaya became the artistic director of the experimental ballet creative center Sheila, organized by her in Moscow. In 1987, she received her Candidate of Arts.

== Personal life ==
Shikhlinskaya was married four times. The longest marriage, 19 years, was to Andrei Loginov. She has a daughter Jeyla (played daughter of the Shikhlinskaya character in the movie Summer Season (1985) based on the work of Elchin Efendiyev) and a son Philip. Jeyla works as a child psychologist in Dubai, where she opened the "Montessori School", Philip works in Dubai as a design architect and has two children.

Leyla Farrukh gizi Shikhlinskaya was the creator of the first multi-disciplinary private women's medical clinic in Baku.

== Filmography ==
- Arshin Mal Alan (film, 1965)
- Summer Season (film, 1985)
- The Extension Force (1964)
- Dante's Birthday (film, 1978)
- Dada Gorgud (film, 1975)
- The Day Passed (film, 1971)
- The Shore of Memories (film, 1972)
- Window of Sorrows (film, 1986)
- Golden Goose (film, 1972)
- Muslim Magomaev Sings (film, 1971)
- The First Hour of Life (film, 1973)
- The Girl-Witness (film, 1990)

== Recognition ==
In 1993, Shikhlinskaya was awarded the title of Honored Artist of Azerbaijan.
