= The Darvish Detonates Paris =

1976 film by Shamil Mahmudbeyov and Kamil Rustambeyov

- An illustrated poster in Czech
- Directed by: Shamil Mahmudbeyov; Kamil Rustambeyov
- Screenplay by: Adham Gulubeyov
- Based on: A Story about the Botanist-Doctor Monsieur Jordan and the Famous Sorcerer Dervish Mastali Shah by Mirza Fatali Akhundov
- Produced by: Azerbaijanfilm
- Starring: Sergei Yursky; Adil Isgandarov; Mirza Babayev; Leyla Badirbeyli; Hasanagha Turabov; Safura Ibrahimova; Enver Gasanov
- Cinematography: Arif Narimanbayov; Zaur Maharramov
- Music by: Tofig Guliyev
- Release date: 1976
- Running time: 68 minutes
- Country: Soviet Union
- Languages: Russian, Azerbaijani

The Darvish Detonates Paris is a 1976 Soviet comedy film directed by Shamil Mahmudbeyov and Kamil Rustambeyov. It stars Adil Isgandarov as Hatamkhan agha, Sergei Yursky as Monsieur Jordan, and Mirza Babayev as Darvish Mastali Shah. The film was based on the satirical comedy A Story about the Botanist-doctor Monsieur Jordan and the Famous Sorcerer Dervish Mastali Shah, inspired from true events, by Azerbaijani playwright and poet Mirza Fatali Akhundov. The film criticizes the ignorance and backwardness in 19th century Azerbaijan. The character Monsieur Jordan is based on the accomplished French botanist Alexis Jordan.

The Darvish Detonates Paris is often viewed as one of the most memorable films of Azerbaijani cinema. It holds an important place in the cultural heritage of Azerbaijan.

== Plot ==
The events take place in the mid-19th century Karabakh. Famous French botanist Monsieur Jordan visits Karabakh to investigate a number of plant species. After his arrival, he is suggested to visit and stay at the mansion of the wealthy landlord Hatamkhan agha. Although the nephew of Hatamkhan, Shahbaz, was planned to marry the daughter of Hatamkhan, Sharafnisa, after multiple conversations with the family and locals, Monsieur Jordan wants to take Shahbaz with him to Paris for a few years and educate him there. Seeing this, Sharafnisa and her mother Shahrabanu hire a sorcerer called Darvish Mastali shah. Darvhish puts on a show for the women, creating with wood a simple miniature town which he claims to be Paris and burning it down and ordering devils and ifrits to destroy real Paris, and at the same moment Jordan knocks at the door shouting that Paris has been destroyed and asks for horses because he has to leave immediately. When asked who destroyed it, he replies: "Devils, ifrits, demons...". He also mentions that king Louis Philippe fled to England, so it can be deduced that he letter informed him about the French Revolution of 1848. Afterwards, Monsieur Jordan heads back to Paris but does not take Shahbaz with him because of the urgency of his return.

== Cast ==
- Sergei Yursky as Monsieur Jordan
- Adil Isgandarov as Hatamkhan agha
- Mirza Babayev as Darvish Mastali shah
- Leyla Badirbeyli as Shahrabanu
- Anvar Hasanov as Shahbaz
- Momunat Gurbanova as Sharafnisa
- Hasanagha Turabov as Rashid
- Fazil Salayev as Gulamali
- Kamil Maharramov as Gambar
- Safura Ibrahimova as Sanam

== See also ==
- Cinema of Azerbaijan
- Azerbaijanfilm
