= Dada Gorgud =

Dada Gorghud
- Directed by: Tofig Taghizade
- Written by: Anar Rzayev
- Music by: Emin Sabitoglu
- Production company: Azerbaijanfilm
- Release date: 1975
- Running time: 126 minutes
- Country: Soviet Union
- Languages: Azerbaijani; Russian

Dada Gorgud (Azerbaijani: Dədə Qorqud) — Soviet 2-episode epic film of 1975 with elements of drama and melodrama produced by the film studio Azerbaijanfilm, based on the Oguz epic "Book of Dede Korkut".

== Plot ==
Dada Gorghud is a wise old man who witnesses countless human disasters, unprecedented wars and calls the people to work on earth. In the film, there are such feelings as love, friendship, brotherhood and loyalty to the motherland, there are also such moments as fighting and war.

== Cast ==
- Hasan Mammadov — Dada Gorgud
- Hashim Gadoyev — Qazan khan
- Rasim Balayev — Beyrak
- Givi Tokhadze — Alp Aruz
- Hamlet Gurbanov — Kipchak Malik
- Leyla Shikhlinskaya — Banichichek
- Shafiga Mammadova — Burla Khatun
- Inara Guliyeva — Seljan
- Elchin Mammadov - Karaca shepherd
- Farhad Yusifov — Tural
- Dinara Yusifova — Gunel
- Ali Hagverdiyev — Yalincik
- Gunduz Abbasov — Baybura
- Afrasiyab Mammadov — Bayandir Khan
