= Tahmina (film) =

- Cover of the Video CD release
- Directed by: Rasim Ojagov
- Written by: Anar Rzayev
- Based on: Beşmərtəbəli Evin Altıncı Mərtəbəsi by Anar Rzayev
- Produced by: Rasul Guliyev
- Starring: Fakhraddin Manafov; Meral Konrat; Hasanagha Turabov
- Cinematography: Kenan Aziz
- Edited by: Gulshan Salimova
- Music by: Rafig Babayev
- Production company: Tammetrajli Badii Film
- Distributed by: Ojag Film Studio
- Release date: 1993
- Running time: 106 minutes
- Country: Azerbaijan
- Languages: Azeri, Turkish, Russian

Tahmina (Azerbaijani: Təhminə) is a 1993 Azerbaijani romantic drama. The screenplay was written by Anar Rzayev based on his novel Beşmərtəbəli Evin Altıncı Mərtəbəsi ("The Sixth Floor of a Five-Storey Building", 1974–78). Directed by Rasim Ojagov, this film depicts the love affair between Zaur, a man from an affluent family, and Tahmina, a divorced woman doing her best to survive in a conservative society. The film is considered to be one of the best Azerbaijani movies produced in the 1990s. Funding for the film was provided by a Turkish businessman.

== Plot ==
The romantic relationship of the main characters Zaur and Tahmina starts off with a passionate affair and leads to many problems in a conservative society. Zaur (Fakhraddin Manafov), the 26-year-old son of a prominent and well-to-do professor (Hasan Mammadov), falls in love with Tahmina (Meral Konrat), a divorced TV anchor. Tahmina is admired by many of her colleagues and friends of Zaur's family. This attention to Tahmina from others causes Zaur to experience periodic jealousy.

In due time, Tahmina is sent to Moscow for a professional assignment. Zaur is so much in love with Tahmina that he follows her to Moscow.

Zaur's family condemns this romantic relationship and tries to divert Zaur into an arranged marriage with Firangiz (Laura Rzayeva), the 19-year-old daughter of a family friend. Social pressure and continuous calls from Zaur's mother (Zarnigar Aghakishiyeva) to Tahmina eventually cause problems in their relationship, leading them to break up.

Zaur, listening to his parents' advice, marries Firangiz. Tahmina, on the other hand, takes solitude in heavy drinking to ease her heart's pain. Due to this habit, Tahmina experiences problems with her liver and eventually dies of cirrhosis during Zaur and Firangiz's honeymoon in Istanbul.

When the couple returns from the honeymoon, Zaur's brother-in-law breaks the news to him. Although Zaur is devastated, the final scene of the movie shows him taking out his wife's grocery list and driving to the market, implying that life goes on.

== Production ==
The movie was shot in Baku, Moscow and Istanbul in 1993.

== Cast ==
- Fakhraddin Manafov as Zaur
- Meral Konrat as Tahmina
- Zarnigar Aghakishiyeva as Ziver (Zaur's mother)
- Hasan Mammadov as Professor Zeynally (Zaur's father)
- Larisa Khalafova as Madina
- Hasanagha Turabov as Dadash
- Tofig Mirzoyev as Mukhtar
- Laura Rzayeva as Firangiz
- Elmira Shabanova as Aliya
- Fizuli Huseynov as Spartak
- Malik Dadashov as Murtuz
- Dadash Kazimov as Mammadnasir
- Eldaniz Rasulov as Aspirant
- Georgy Shtil as Policeman
- Mebud Maharramov as Zaur's colleague
- Nuriyya Ahmadova as Sima
- Mayak Karimov as Gurban
- Talat Rahmanov as guest at a birthday party
- Kanan Mammadov as guest at a birthday party
- Tanila Ahmarova as guest at a birthday party
- Elbrus Vahidov as guest at a birthday party

== Awards ==
In 1993 the Baku 2nd Film Festival awarded Rasim Ojagov with Best Director award and Zarnigar Aghakishiyeva with Best Actress award.

== Analysis ==
In Azeri Women in Transition: Women in Soviet and Post-Soviet Azerbaijan, the anthropologist Farideh Heyat discussed Tahmina, saying that "The story reflects many of the tensions and contradictions that faced the young in the professional middle-class society of Baku in the post-Soviet period," and noted how it portrayed the influence that mothers wielded over their adult children in Azeri society.

== See also ==
- Azerbaijani films of the 1990s
