= Shafiga Mammadova =

Azerbaijani actress (born 1945)

- Şəfiqə Məmmədova
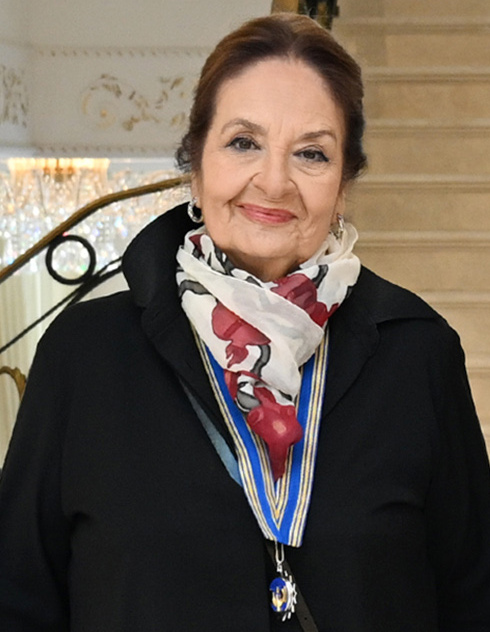
- Shafiga Mammadova in 2025
- Born: March 30, 1945; Derbent, Dagestan
- Education: Azerbaijan State University of Culture and Arts
- Occupations: actress, politician

Shafiga Hashim gizi Mammadova (Azerbaijani: Şəfiqə Haşım qızı Məmmədova; March 30, 1945) is an Azerbaijani cinema and theatre actress. She was the honoured as Artist of the Azerbaijan SSR (1974) and People's Artist of the Azerbaijan SSR (1982).

== Biography ==
She was born on March 30, 1945, in Derbent, Dagestan.

In 1968, Shafiga graduated from the actor faculty of Azerbaijan State Theatrical Institute. Since 1968, she has played at Azerbaijan State Academic Drama Theatre and since 1980, she has taught at Azerbaijan State University of Culture and Arts (formerly the Theatrical Institute). From 1995 to 2000, she was deputy of the National Assembly of Azerbaijan. She has a professor's degree.

By the Order of President Ilham Aliyev dated March 29, 2025, Shafiga Mammadova was awarded the "Istiglal" Order for her significant contributions to the development of Azerbaijani culture. The order was presented to her on the same day by President Ilham Aliyev.

== Awards ==
- June 1, 1974—Honored Artiste of the Azerbaijan SSR.
- 1980—the State Prize of the Azerbaijan SSR for Farida's role in Birthday film.
- 1981—the USSR State Prize for Gulya’s role in Interrogation film.
- December 1, 1982—People's Artist of the Azerbaijan SSR.
- March 29, 2025—Istiglal Order

== Activity in the theatre ==
Shafiga Mammadova created unforgettable characters in the theatre.

- Hamlet – Gertrude
- Gathering of Mad People of Jalil Mammadguluzadeh – Pirpiz Sona
- Disappointed Girl – Sona
- Summer Days of the City – Dilare
- The Living Corpse of Leo Tolstoy – Masha
- Native Land of Chinghiz Aitmatov – Jenshengul’s wife
- Intrigue and Love – Lady Milford
- Gold of Eugene O'Neilll – Susanne
- Khayyam of Huseyn Javid – Sevda
- Voice Coming from the Gardens of Ilyas Efendiyev – Guljan
- My Sin – Nurjahan
- Destroyed Diaries – Anjel
- After the Rain of Bakhtiyar Vahabzadeh – Nihal
- When the Fairytale of Imran Gasimov Begins – Tahira
- Comedy of Mankind or Don Juan – Theodora
- Parvenues – Yelena Nikolayevna
- Human of Samad Vurgun – Natasha
- Jealous Hearts of Racho Stoyanov – Milkana
- Aydin of Jafar Jabbarly – Gultekin
- Bald Mountain of Akram Aylisli

== Filmography ==
- Swarthy (1966) – Perijahan
- Our Jabish muellim (1969) – Jabish’s wife
- Through the Path of Charvadars (1974) – Sariya
- Dada Gorgud (1975) – Burla Khatun
- Value of happiness (1976) – Rukhsara
- Birthday (1977) – Farida
- To Volcano (1977)
- Interrogation (1979) – Gulya
- Film director Hasan Seyidbeyli (2002, documentary)
