= Hasanagha Turabov =

Azerbaijani actor (1938–2003)

Həsənağa Turabov
- Born: Həsənağa Səttar oğlu 24 March 1938; Baku, Azerbaijan SSR, Soviet Union
- Died: 23 February 2003 (aged 64); Baku, Azerbaijan
- Years active: 1956—1999

Hasanagha Turabov (Azerbaijani: Həsənağa Turabov, Russian: Гасанага Турабов; 24 March 1938, Baku – 23 February 2003, Baku) was an Azerbaijani and Soviet actor, who starred in leading roles in numerous Azerbaijani films, including Yeddi Ogul Isterem, Babek, laureate of the State Prize of Azerbaijan SSR (1972), People's Artist of Azerbaijan SSR (1982), and laureate of the Order, a member of the Supreme Soviet of the USSR.

== Life ==
Turabov was born on 24 March 1938 in Baku and studied at secondary school No. 31. After graduating from high school (Azerbaijan Art Institute), he entered the Academy of Acting. Since that time he worked as an actor at the Azerbaijan Drama Theater till the end of his life. From 1987 to 2001 he worked as director and artistic director of the theater. Hasanagha died in 2003. He was buried in the "Gurd Gate" cemetery.

== Career ==
Hasanagha preferred the lyric-psychological style in the scene. Among his roles are Vahid ("The Village Girl"), Azer ("Good Man"), Hamlet ("Hamlet"), Lionel ("The Forest Girl") and Alexander ("Dead") Khayyam ("Khayyam").

The image of Garay in the movie "I want Seven Sons" is one of his most memorable roles. Turabov played the role of "The Last Cross", "The Crocodile Trail", "Heart ... Heart ...", "Joy of Joy", "Anniversary of Dante", "Gem Window", " He was the director of the film "Bloody Land". His last films were Rustam Ibrahimbeyov and Ramiz Hasanoglu's "Family" and Eldar Guliyev's "What a wonderful world!". Hasanagha Turabov was also a professor at the Azerbaijan State University of Culture and Arts.

== Awards and honorary titles ==
- Honored Artist of the Azerbaijan SSR - 1971
- State Prize laureate of the Azerbaijan SSR - 1972

== Filmography ==
=== Actor ===
- 1966 - Why are you silent?
- 1970 - Sevil
- 1970 - My Seven Sons - Gerai Bey
- 1971 - The day passed
- 1972 - Flamingo, pink bird - Fazilov
- 1972 - I grew up by the sea
- 1973 - Happiness to you girls! - Shamsi
- 1973 - Fair wind
- 1973 - Your first hour
- 1974 - The Avenger from Ganjabasar
- 1974 - In the footsteps of Charvadars
- 1974 - Four Sundays
- 1975 - Only clouds are higher
- 1976 - The Darvish Detonates Paris
- 1976 - Heart ... heart ... - Murad
- 1978 - Owl arrived
- 1978 - Dante's Anniversary
- 1979 - Babek - Afshin
- 1979 - Interrogation - General
- 1980 - I want to understand
- 1980 - I'll be back
- 1981 - Do not worry, I'm with you - Jafar
- 1982 - Nizami
- 1983 - Gachag Nabi
- 1984 - The memory of a pomegranate tree
- 1984 - Legend of Silver Lake - Agazeki
- 1984 - It's time to saddle horses - Nabi
- 1984 - The Tale of Old Oak
- 1986 - The Window of Sorrow
- 1986 - Signal from the sea
- 1990 - Murder on the night train
- 1992 - Tahmina
- 1998 - Family
- 1999 - How beautiful is this world

== See also ==
List of Azerbaijani actors

List of Azerbaijani film directors

List of Azerbaijani film producers
