= Bakhtiar (film) =

- Russian: Бахтияр; Azerbaijani: Bəxtiyar
- Directed by: Latif Safarov
- Written by: Boris Laskin; Nikolai Rozhkov
- Produced by: Bashir Kuliev Shamil oglu
- Starring: Rashid Behbudov; Lyuba Belykh; Sofa Besirzade; Tamara Chernova; Merziyye Davudova
- Cinematography: Arif Narimanbekov
- Music by: Tofik Kulyev
- Production company: Azerbaijanfilm
- Release date: 1955
- Running time: 97 min.
- Country: Soviet Union
- Languages: Russian; Azerbaijani

Bakhtiar (Russian: Бахтияр; Azerbaijani: Bəxtiyar, Bäxtiyar) is a 1955 Soviet comedy film directed by Latif Safarov.

== Plot ==
Everybody convinces Bakhtiar Muradov, who has a beautiful voice, to go to the conservatory. But the young man decides to become an oilman, like his father, who died at the front of the Patriotic War. He realizes his intention and becomes a drilling master. Favorite girl Bakhtiar, Sasha Verkhovskaya, leaves for Moscow to study in the geological survey institute. Together with her rival and rival Bakhtiyar fat Yusuf, going to devote himself to the trade business. At this time in the club of oil workers agile businessman Aga-Bala arranges a series of performances by Bakhtiar Muradov.

== Cast ==
- Rashid Behbudov as Bakhtiar
- Sofa Besirzade as Member of the Commission
- Tamara Chernova as Sasha
- Merziyye Davudova as Gulbadam
- Mukhlis Dzhanni-zade as Kerim
- Ismail Efendiyev as Rza Ismayilov
- Suleyman Elesgerov as Club director
- Tatyana Pelttser as aunt Natasha
- Munavvar Kalantarli as Gyulzar Huseynova
