= List of Azerbaijani film producers =

This is a list of notable Azerbaijani film producers, which is arranged alphabetically.

== I ==
- Rustam Ibragimbekov

== K ==
- Farman Karimzade
- Rauf Khalilov

== S ==
- Abbas Mirza Sharifzadeh

== T ==
- Rza Tahmasib

== See also ==
- List of film producers
- List of Azerbaijani film directors
- List of Azerbaijani actors
- List of Azerbaijanis
