= Fakhraddin Manafov =

Azerbaijani actor (born 1955)

- Fəxrəddin Manaf oğlu Manafov
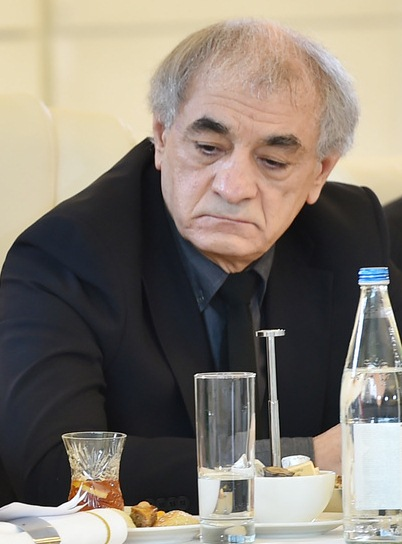
- Fakhraddin Manafov in 2019
- Born: 2 August 1955 (age 71); Khankendi, Azerbaijan SSR, USSR
- Education: Azerbaijan State University of Culture and Arts
- Occupation: Actor
- Years active: 1976–present
- Known for: Tahmina (film) as Zaur
- Awards: People's Artist of Azerbaijan (2000)

Fakhraddin Manaf oglu Manafov (Azerbaijani: Fəxrəddin Manafov) (born 2 August 1955, in Khankendi, Nagorno-Karabakh, NKAO, Soviet Azerbaijan) is an Azerbaijani actor.

== Biography ==
He was born in Khankendi, Nagorno-Karabakh. His family moved to Baku when he was around 5. He made his first movie appearance in 1978. In 1980, Manafov graduated from the Azerbaijan State University of Culture and Arts and started working with Azerbaijanfilm.

- 1975–1980 - studied at the Azerbaijan State Institute of Arts. M. A. Aliyeva.
- 1971–1974 - worked as a projectionist in the House of Actors. A. M. Sharifzadeh.
- 1976–1978 - actor in the educational theater.
- 1989–1993 - actor in the State Theater "South".

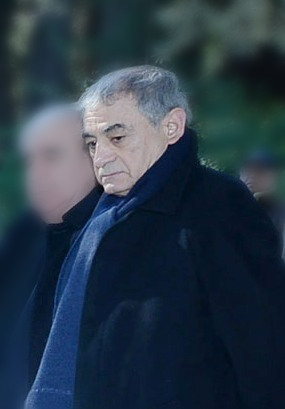
Fakhraddin Manafov in 2016

Since 1978 he has been featured in the films of the film studio "Azerbaijanfilm" Jafar Jabbarly. He was also filmed in the film studio Uzbekfilm and in Russia. He also engaged in scoring. For the role of Ibrahim Khalil Khan in the film "The Fate of the Emperor" he was awarded the "Zirvia" award (rus: peak). From the interview of Fakhraddin Manafov to the Zerkalo newspaper:

On his childhood he wrote:

I was born in Khankendi, left when I was 5–6 years old. I would like to visit Shusha, Jydyr, try honey, berries, swim in the river. Our house was located 7–8 km from Khankendi, on the banks of the Gargar River. I was born in this house, August 2, 1955, on the Day of Azerbaijan National Cinema.

About acting, he said:

Every person contains thousands of people, thousands of characters, thousands of opportunities. A profession of the actor is interesting and great in that the actor can safely pull out of himself into the light of God all these faces. This is the distinguishing feature of the acting profession.

In 2000 he was awarded the title of People's Artist of Azerbaijan. Since 2006, he has been a presidential retiree. On April 24, 2016, Fahraddin Manafov made his debut on the stage of the Azerbaijan State Russian Drama Theater named after Samed Vurgun in Baku, playing in the play "Casanova: Lessons of Love".

== Notable filmography ==
- Business Visit (1982)
- Park (1983)
- Window of Grief (1986)
- Another Life (1987)
- Forgive Me If I Die (1989)
- Murder in the Night Train (1990)
- Seven Days after the Murder (1991)
- Tahmina (1993)
- Hotel Room (1998)
- Drongo (2002)
- Try Not to Breathe (2006)
- A Sovereign's Destiny (2008)
- Mahmud and Maryam (2013)
- Ali and Nino (2016)
