= Adil Isgandarov =

Soviet and Azerbaijani director, actor, and pedagogue

- Adil İsgəndərov
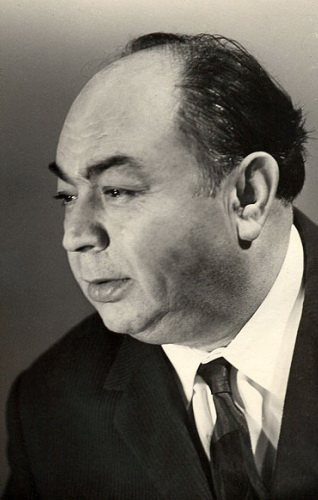
- Born: May 5, 1910; Yelizavetpol, Caucasus Viceroyalty, Russian Empire (present-day Ganja, Azerbaijan)
- Died: September 18, 1978 (aged 68); Baku, Azerbaijan SSR, Soviet Union
- Burial place: Alley of Honor
- Occupations: Actor; theater director; film director; pedagogue
- Years active: 1937–1978
- Spouse: Zinaida Fyodorovna
- Children: 2

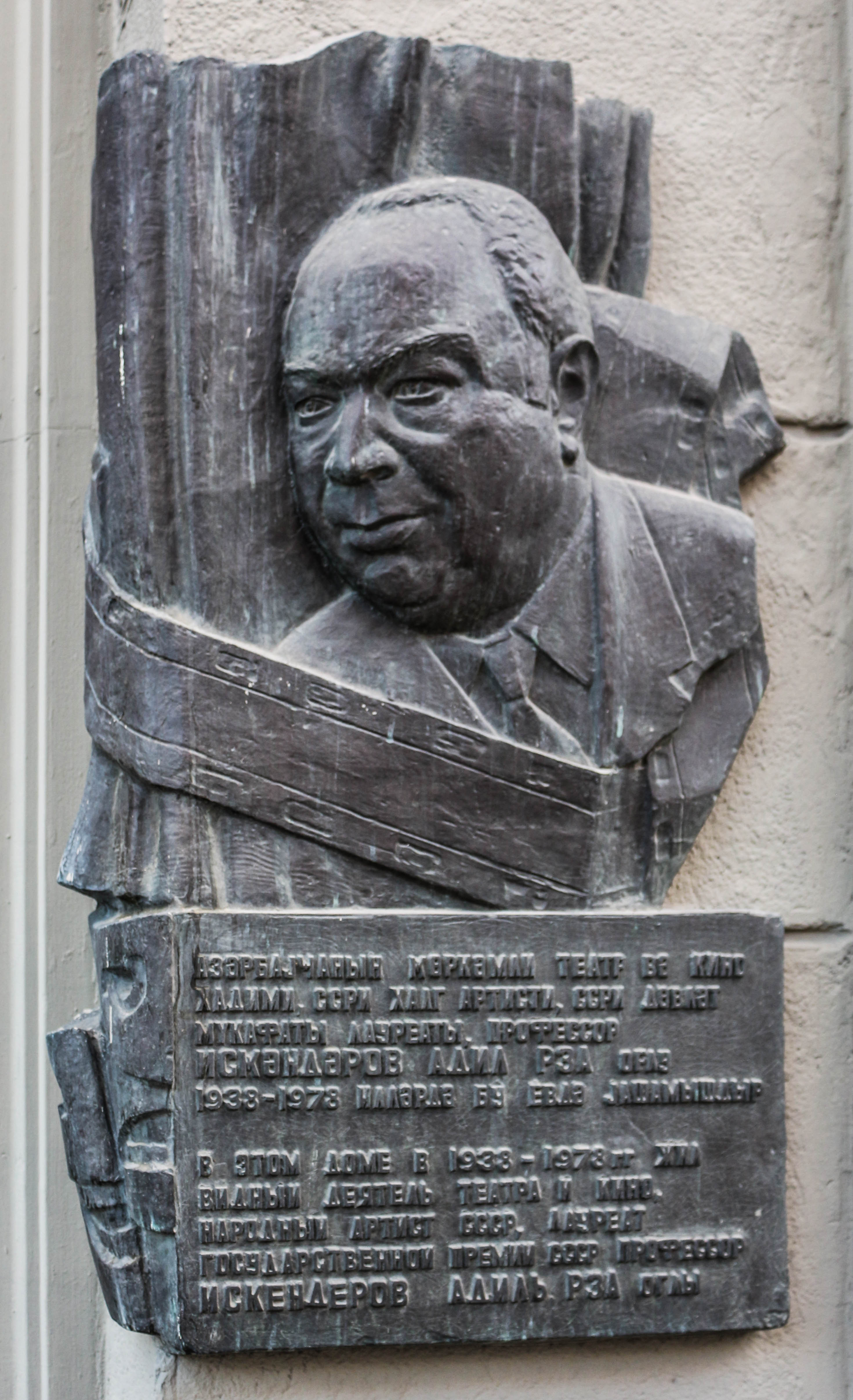
Adil Isgandarov's memorial plaque in Baku

Adil Rza bey oglu Isgandarov (Note: Azerbaijani: Adil Rza bəy oğlu İsgəndərov; Russian: Адиль Рза оглы Искендеров, romanized: Adil Rza ogly Iskenderov) (5 May 1910 – 18 September 1978) was a Soviet and Azerbaijani director, stage and film actor, and pedagogue. He was awarded the People's Artiste of the Azerbaijan SSR (1959).

== Biography ==
Isgandarov joined amateur pioneers association at 10. When he was 13, he played a role as Karam in Gachag Karam play. After gaining fame in Ganja, he was brought to Baku. Isgandarov got his first education in director-actor field in Baku Technical School of Theatre. After graduation, he got professional experience in Moscow from 1932 to 1936 and graduated from Lunacharsky State Institute for Theatre Arts in 1936. After returning to Baku, he worked at Azerbaijan State Academic National Drama Theatre as director, then chief director from 1936 to 1960. Isgandarov also worked at Azerbaijan State University of Culture and Arts named after Mirzaagha Aliyev from 1937 to 1956. He was elected as the deputy in 1955 and 1959 for Supreme Soviet of the Azerbaijan SSR. Isgandarov served as the director of Azerbaijanfilm named after Jafar Jabbarly from 1966 to 1974.

== Awards ==
- Honored Art Worker of the Azerbaijan SSR (1938)
- Order of the Badge of Honour (1938)
- People's Artiste of the Azerbaijan SSR (1943)
- Order of the Red Banner of Labour (1946)
- Stalin Prize (1948)
- Order of Lenin (1949)
- People's Artist of the USSR (1959)
- Medal "For Valiant Labour in the Great Patriotic War 1941–1945"

== Filmography ==
=== As actor ===
Year	Film	Role
1956	If Not That One, Then This One	Ruffian
1956	The Black Stones	Khalilov
1957	Two People from a Neighborhood	Chairman of the court
1958	On Distant Shores	Rosselini
1961	Layla and Majnun	Merchant
1962	Labor and Rose	Club manager
1963	Romeo Is My Neighbor	Guliyev
1964	The Man in Chains	Nikandro
1966	Twenty-Six Baku Commissars	Khachaturov
1968	In the Name of the Law	Kamilov
1971	The Last Pass	Karbalai
1971	The Stars Do Not Go Out	Nasibbey Yusifbeyli
1974	The 1001th Tour	Aliqapar
1976	The Darvish Detonates Paris	Hatamkhan agha
1977	Stab in the Back	Dadashli
1977	Face to the Wind	Farman
1978	My Love, My Sorrow	Old master

=== As director ===
Year	Film	Director	Conductor Director	Producer	Executive Producer	Writer
1964	Where is Ahmed?		Yes			

== See also ==
- List of People's Artistes of the Azerbaijan SSR
