= Arif Babayev =

Azerbaijani film director

- Born: 24 September 1928; Baku, Azerbaijan SSR
- Died: 26 August 1983 (aged 54); Baku, Azerbaijan SSR
- Citizenship: Soviet
- Occupation: Film director

Arif Haji oglu Babayev (Azerbaijani: Arif Hacı oğlu Babayev) was an Azerbaijani film director and Honorary Art Worker of the Azerbaijan SSR (1964).

== Biography ==
Arif Babayev was born on September 20, 1928, in Baku. The Babayevs family lived on Qala Street, in Ichari Shahar. As a child, Arif attended theatrical circles. His engagement in theatre led him to apply to study in a theatrical school. Until then, he played walk-on parts in the plays “Malikmammad”, “Garaja giz” and “Ibrat”. In 1946, the Azerbaijan State Theatrical Institute was created on the basis of the theatrical school. Arif Babayev was admitted into the directing program and was taught by director and actor Mehdi Mammadov. Mehdi Mammadov entrusted Mayor's role from N.V.Gogol’s The Government Inspector to Arif Babayev. In 1953, Arif Babayev graduated from the institute and was placed to work at the Nakhchivan State Theater. In this theatre, he staged Gogol's play Marriage. He returned to Baku after some time and began working as a stage director at the Theater of Young Spectators.

On February 14, 1956, the first program went on air of the Azerbaijani Television. Arif Babayev was invited to work on television. In 1956, he shot his first documentary film Children of our City, marking the birth of television film in Azerbaijan. In 1959, he was appointed the chief director of the Azerbaijani Television. In these years, he shot a number of documentaries, staged television plays, such as Moabit Diaries by Musa Cälil, Blind Woman by Taras Shevchenko, Law by Rasul Rza, and The Morning by Mehdi Huseyn.

In 1964, he became the first television worker in Azerbaijan who was given the title of the Honorary Art Worker. He was invited to Azerbaijanfilm in the same year. In 1964, he debuted as a director with the short film Summit, the first one in the series Whom We Love More, based on an original screenplay by Imran Gasimov.

== Filmography ==
Arif Babayev has directed the following films:

Year	Film
1964	Summit
1966	Shirali descended from the mountain
1967	A Man Drops Anchor
1968	The Last Night of Childhood
1971	The Day Passed
1973	Your First Hour
1975	An Apple Looks like an Apple
1977	A stab in the Back
1979	Forgive Us
1981	The Day after Tomorrow, at Midnight
