= Vedi =

City in Ararat, Armenia

Vedi Վեդի
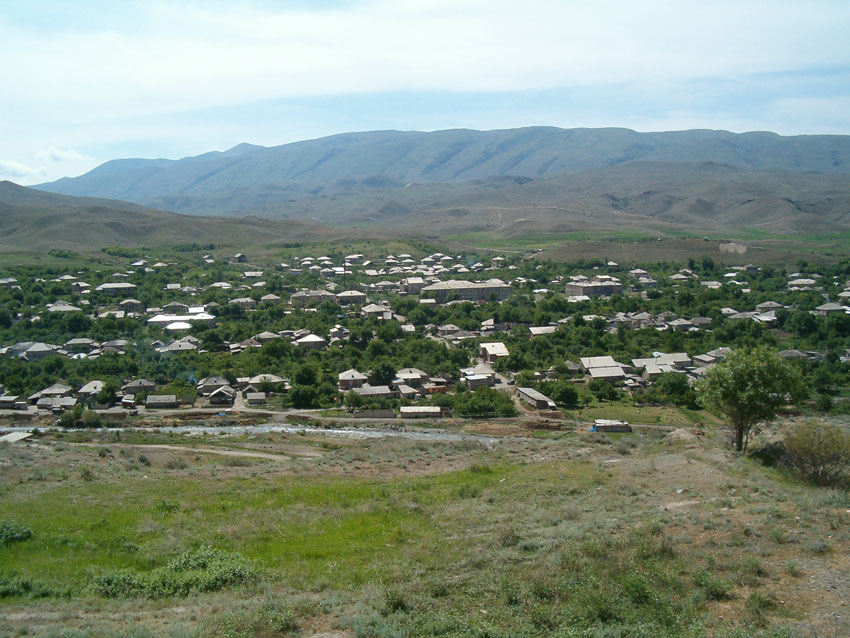
- Vedi

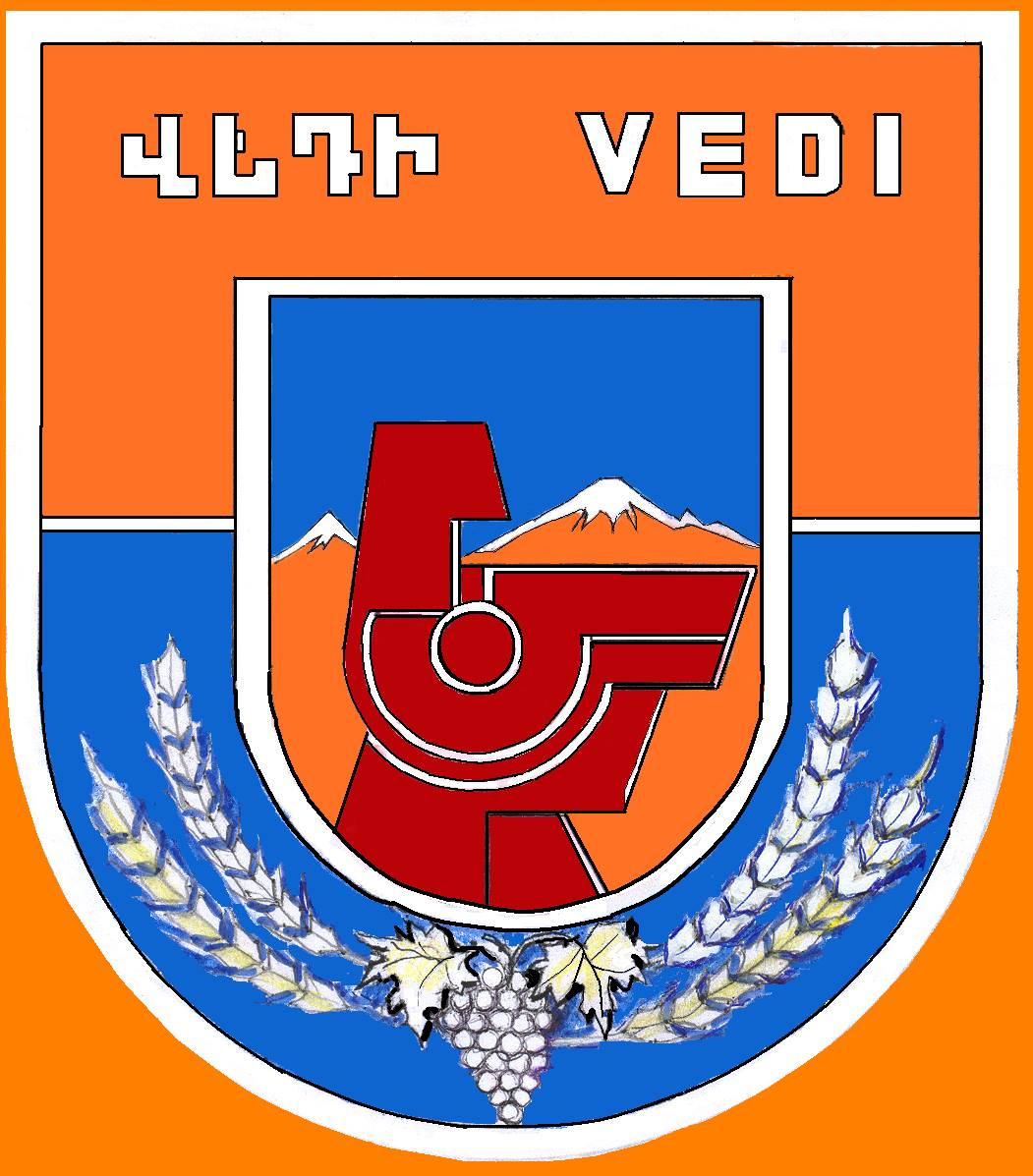
- Coat of arms

- Location within Armenia Location within Ararat
- Coordinates: 39°54′38″N 44°43′40″E
- Country: Armenia
- Province: Ararat
- Municipality: Vedi
- First mentioned: 13th century

Government
  - Mayor: Varuzhan Barseghyan

Area
  - Total: 5.6 km^{2} (2.2 sq mi)
- Elevation: 900 m (3,000 ft)

Population (2022 census)
  - Total: 11,066
  - Density: 2,000/km^{2} (5,100/sq mi)
- Time zone: UTC+4 (GMT)
- Postal code: 601
- Area code: (+374) 234
- Website: Official website

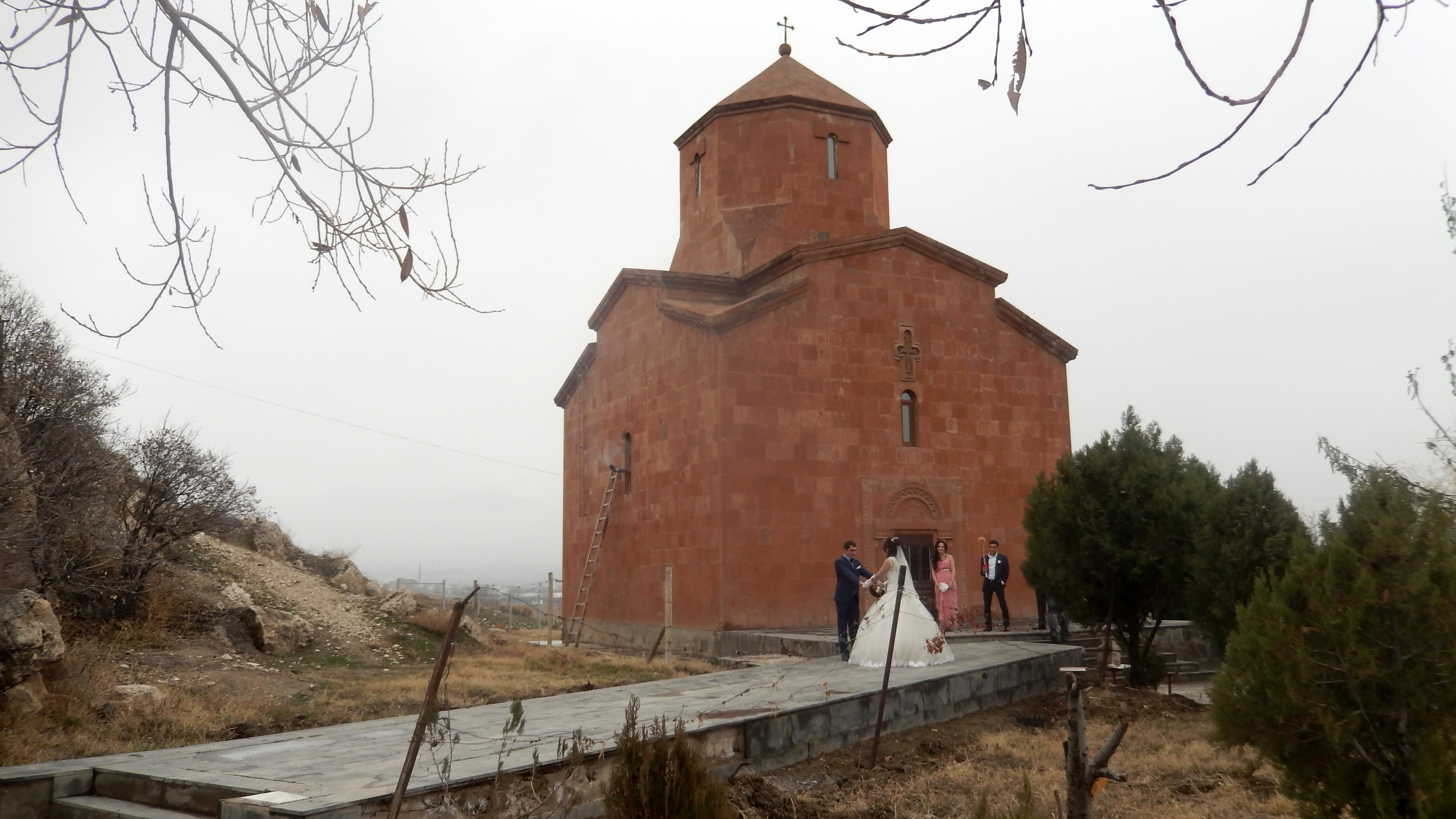
Holy Mother of God Church

Vedi (Armenian: Վեդի) is a city and urban municipal community in the Vedi Municipality of the Ararat Province of Armenia, located along the Vedi River, 35 kilometres (22 miles) south of the capital Yerevan, and 18 kilometres (11 miles) southeast of the provincial centre Artashat. According to the 2011 census, the population of the town was 11,384. As per the 2016 official estimate, Vedi has a population of around 10,600. According to the 2022 census, the population of the town was 11,066.

== Etymology ==
The name Vedi is derived from the Arabic word wadi, meaning valley. It may have been incorporated into Armenian through the Persian language. Vedi is also the name of the river by which the town is located. The town has been occasionally known as Verin Vedi (Upper Vedi in Armenian). It was officially renamed Vedi in 1946.

== History ==
Following the Russo-Persian War of 1826–1828 and the signing of the Treaty of Turkmenchay between Qajar Iran and the Russian Empire in 1828, Vedi became part of Imperial Russia. During the 1830s, around 500 Armenians were allowed to move from the Persian city of Maku to Böyük Vedi. In 1849, the settlement became part of the Erivan Governorate of the Russian Empire.

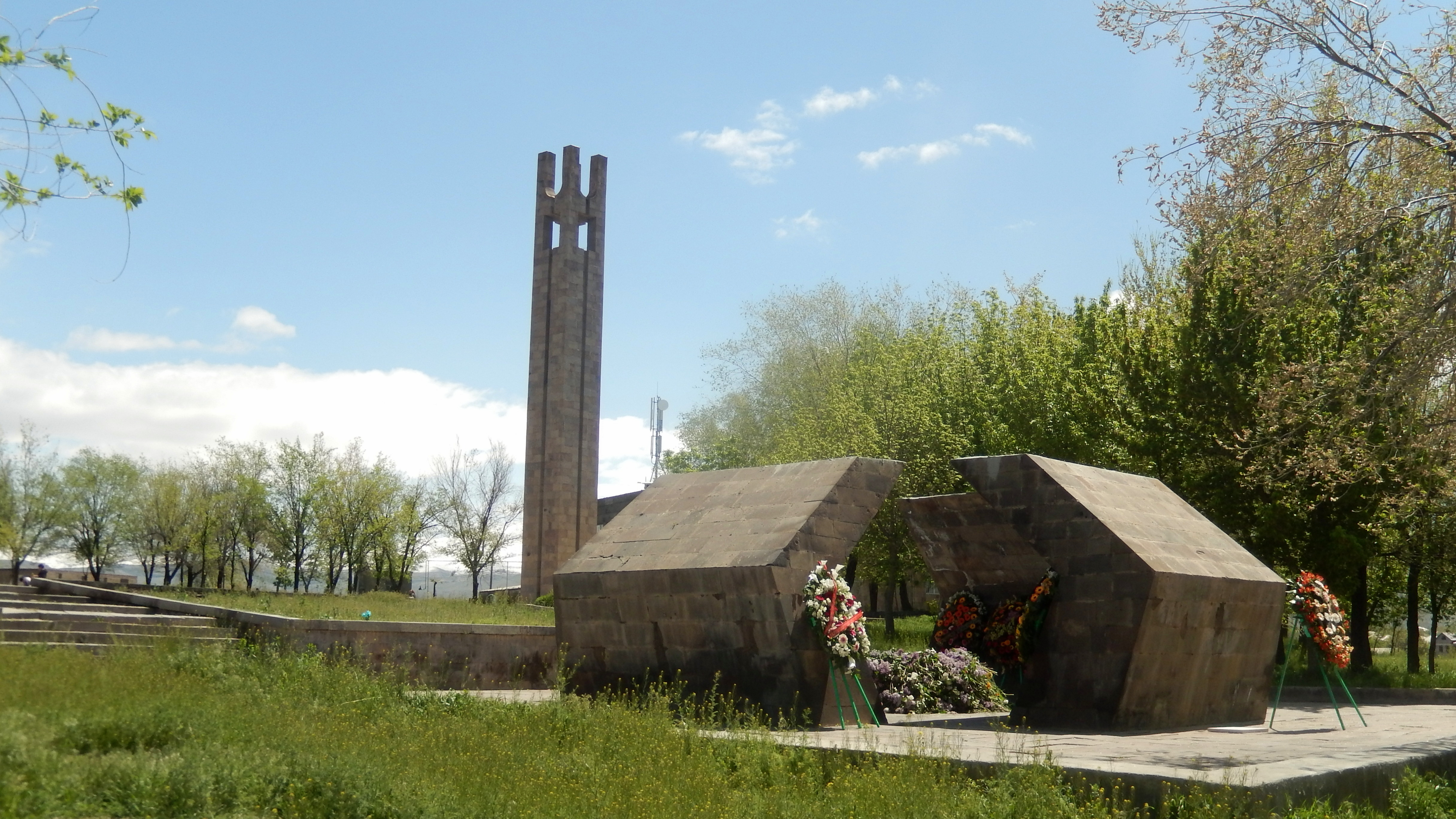
Genocide memorial in Vedi erected in 1977

During the second decade of the 20th century, many Armenian families from the Ottoman cities of Van, Shatakh and Mush migrated to Vedi, escaping the Armenian genocide.

In 1918, Böyük Vedi became a separate gavar (administrative district) within the independent republic of Armenia. During the period of the First Republic of Armenia (1918–1920), Böyük Vedi was one of the main centres of Muslim rebellion against Armenia. On 12 July 1920, the Armenian army recaptured the settlement from local Turkic rebels.

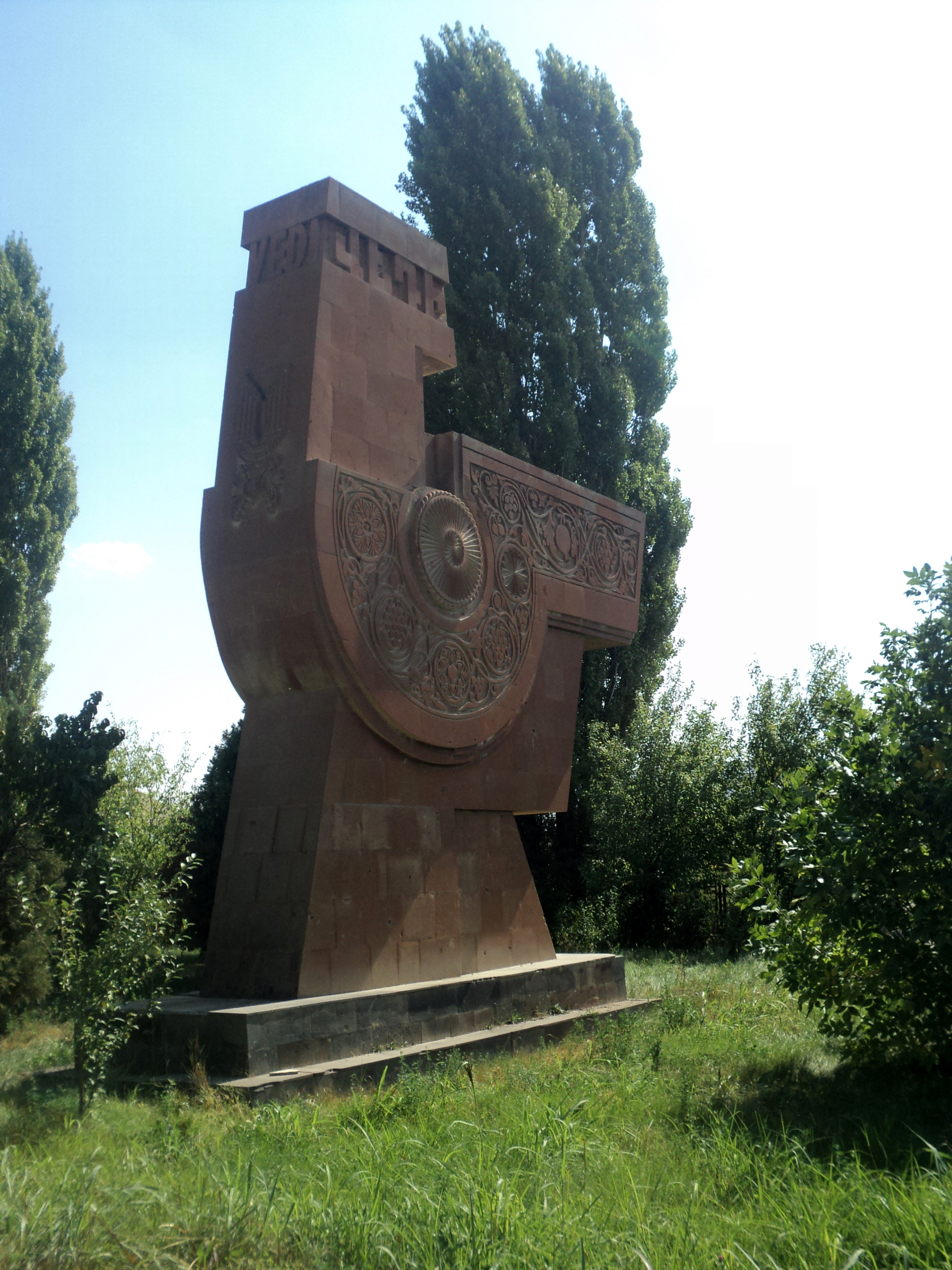
The symbol of Vedi at the northern entrance to the town, erected in 1986

Following the Sovietization of Armenia, Böyük Vedi became the part of the newly formed Vedi raion in 1930. In 1946, the settlement was officially renamed Vedi. During the 1940s and 1950s, Armenian population became majority in Vedi, through a new wave of resettled families from the areas of Sisian, Yeghegnadzor and Martuni. In 1963, Vedi was given the status of an urban-type settlement. In 1968, the Vedi raion was renamed Ararat raion.

After the independence of Armenia, Vedi was given the status of a town as per the administrative reforms of 1995.

== Geography ==
Vedi is located around 35 km south of the capital Yerevan, on the right bank of Vedi river, at the eastern part of the fertile Ararat plain. The town has an average height of 900 meters above sea level. The Goravan semi-desert forms a natural border at the south of the town, while the mountains of Urts form the natural borders of Vedi to the north.

The climate of Vedi is characterized with extremely cold and snowy winters. The temperature could reach down to −32 °C during the month of December. Summer is relatively hot in Vedi extending between May and October, with an average temperature of 25 °C. Average precipitation level is around 225 mm annually.

== Culture ==
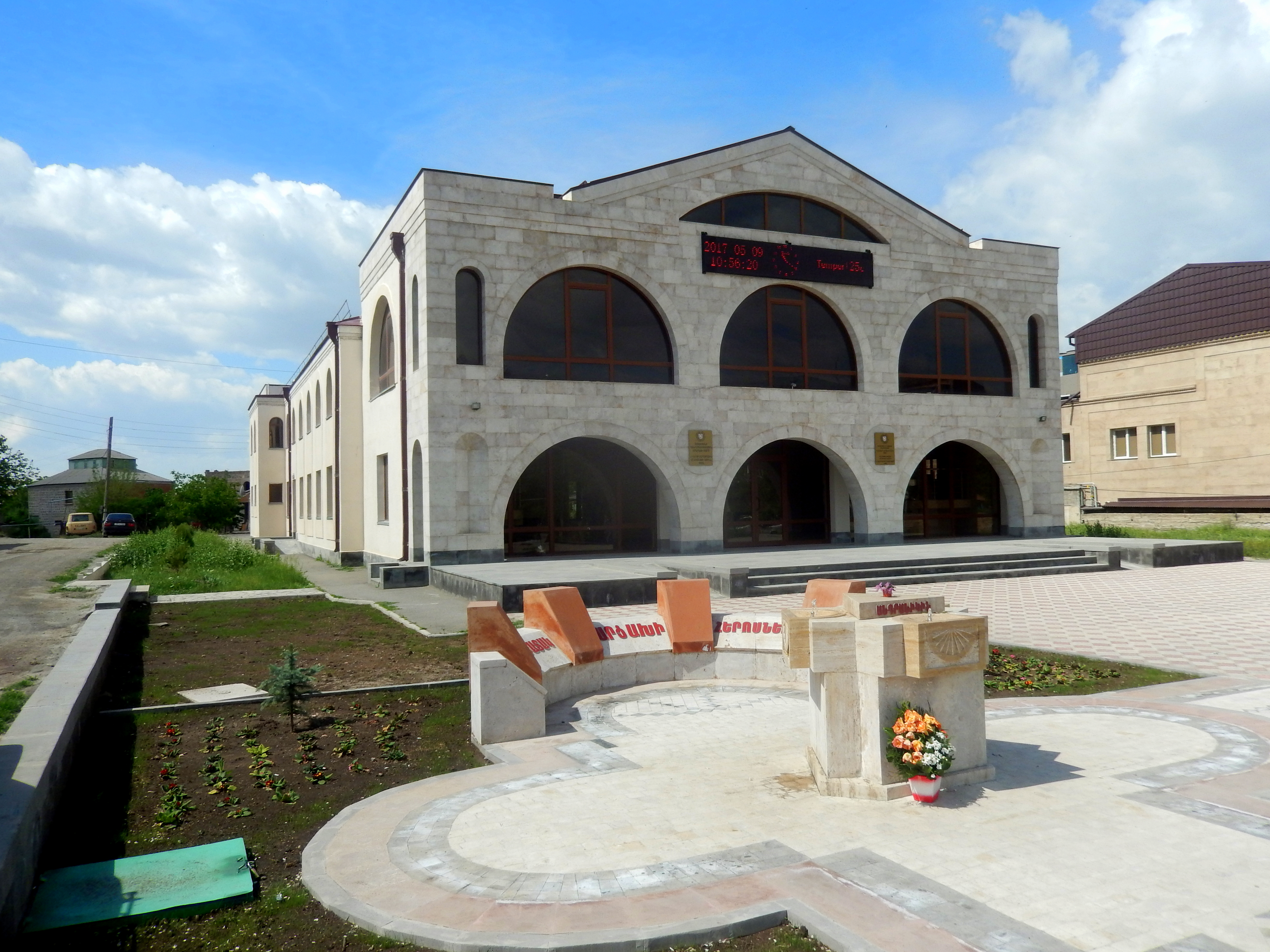
The house of culture in Vedi

The house of culture in Vedi was opened in the 1930s. In 2013, a new building was built to house the town's theatre and other cultural faculties. The house has its theatre group (founded in 1950), folk instruments' ensemble (1977), dance group, brass band, and children's orchestra. During summers, the house of culture organizes the "Musical Thursdays of Vedi" event at the open-air amphitheatre of the central park of the town.

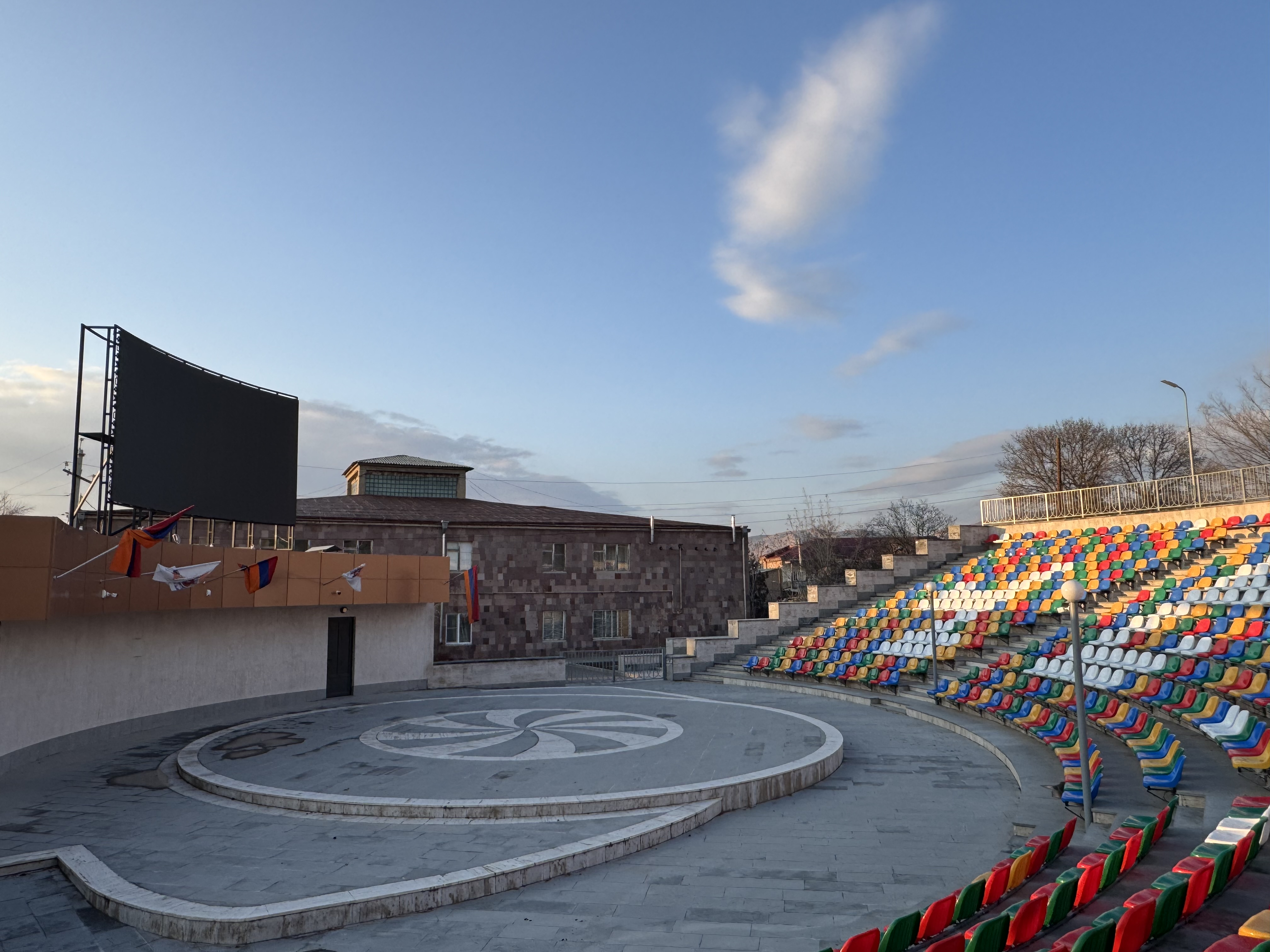
The open-air amphitheatre in Vedi

The Paruyr Sevak Public Library of Vedi has been operating since 1935. It houses around 58,000 books. The town has also a school of music and a school of art.

== Transportation ==
Vedi is located 7 km east of the M-2 Motorway of Armenia. The H-10 regional road connects the town with the motorway. The H-10 extends further to the southeast, reaching the Vayots Dzor Province.

Vedi is connected with the capital Yerevan through regular minis bus daily trips.

== Economy ==
Vedi and the surrounding territories are a major centre for agricultural and dairy products in Armenia. Most of the citizens are mainly involved in agricultural activities. Its main crops are grape and apricot. Home-made wine is very common in Vedi.

The VediAlco founded in 1956, is among the prominent wine and brandy producers in Armenia. It is notable for its semi-sweet wine, Vernashen.

== Education ==
As of 2017, Vedi is home 2 primary school, 1 high school, and 4 pre-school kindergartens.

The art school in Vedi

== Sport ==
Like most of the regions in Armenia, football is the most popular sport in Vedi. A municipal sport school is operating within the territory of the town's central park of the town with a football training ground, swimming pool, indoor sports hall and other facilities.

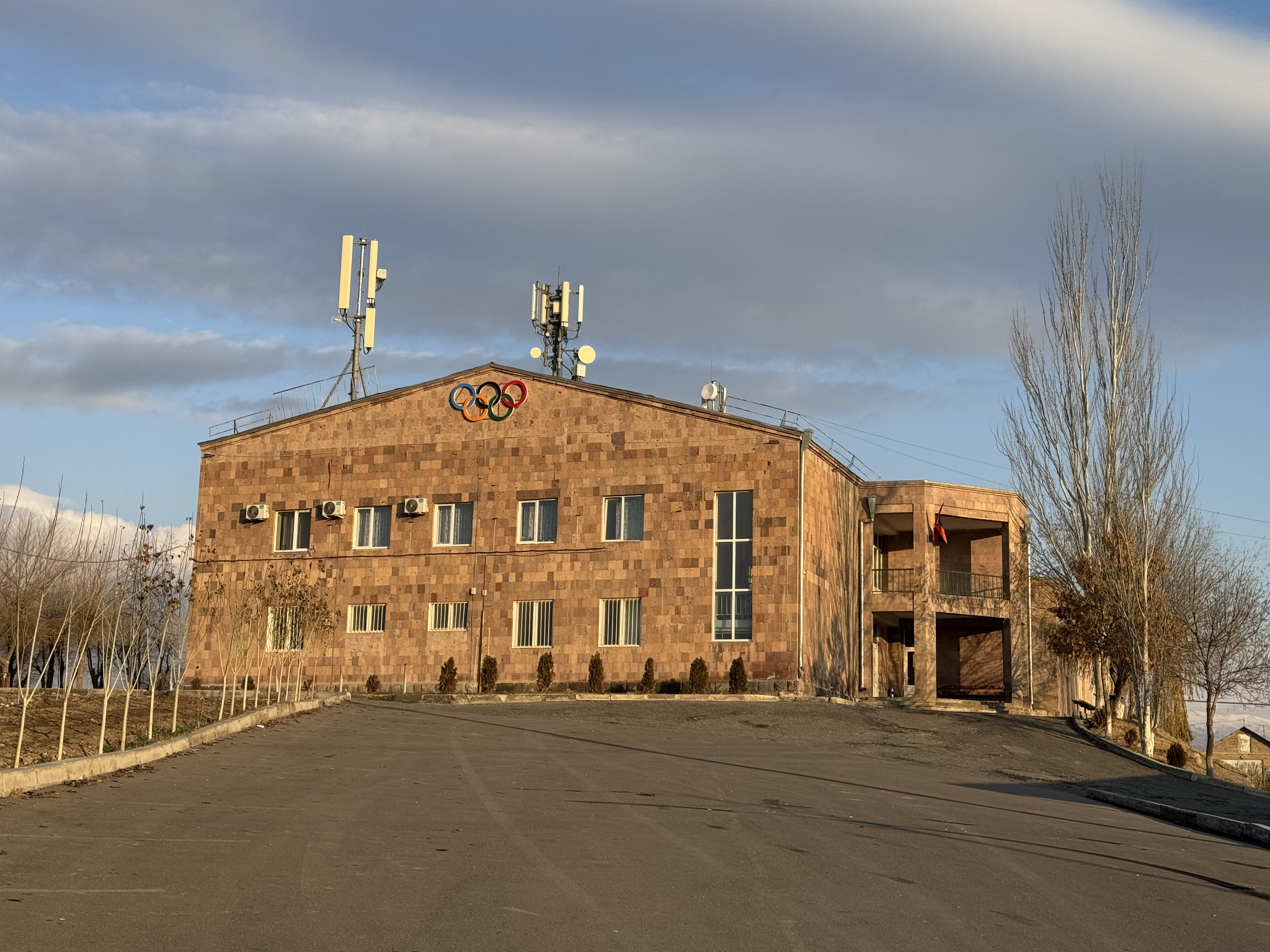
The sport school in Vedi

== Notable people ==
- Armen Mkrtchyan, Olympic silver medalist and European champion in wrestling
- Farman Karimzade, Azerbaijani writer, screenwriter, film director and film producer
- Narek Baveyan, Armenian singer and actor
- Gevorg Karapetyan, former footballer
- Arpine Sargsyan, Armenian politician

== See also ==
- Ararat plain
