= The Day Passed =

1971 Azerbaijani romantic drama film

- Directed by: Arif Babayev
- Written by: Anar Rzayev
- Produced by: Azerbaijanfilm
- Starring: Leyla Shikhlinskaya; Hasan Mammadov; Hasanagha Turabov
- Cinematography: Rasim Ismayilov
- Music by: Emin Sabitoglu
- Distributed by: Azerbaijanfilm
- Release date: 12 February 1971
- Running time: 83 minutes
- Country: Soviet Union
- Languages: Russian, Azerbaijani

The Day Passed (Azerbaijani: Gün Keçdi) is a 1971 Soviet romantic drama film directed by Arif Babayev. It stars Leyla Shikhlinskaya as Asmar, Hasan Mammadov as Ogtay, and Hasanagha Turabov as Ogtay's colleague. It is an adaptation of the novel "Georgian Surname" by Azerbaijani author Anar Rzayev. Rzayev published the novel in 1967 and later adapted it into a screenplay himself.

The film tells the story of two reconciled childhood friends as they reflect on their past, and also encapsulates the atmosphere and soul of Baku at the time. The title refers to the characters' inability to change their past and what has already happened.

Upon release, The Day Passed garnered widespread popularity and critical acclaim in Azerbaijan. It is now considered one of the best Azerbaijani films from the 1970s.

== Plot ==
Asmar, one of the main characters of the film, appears to be happy at first glance. She is married to a diplomat, has a daughter, and many friends. She has exciting memories of travelling all over the world. She used to enjoy her entertaining and pleasant lifestyle, but as time passed, its value and significance faded in her eyes. She still had not found her true place in life.

After separating from Ogtay, she desires to rebuild her life and make certain concessions. The film ends on the note that it is impossible to live clinging to the past and memories, and that everyone should look forward to their future.

During the shooting, actor Hasan Mammadov refused to perform the film's ending, which originally included a sexually intimate scene between Ogtay and Asmar. As a result, the writers were forced to make amends to certain parts of the screenplay.

== Cast ==
- Leyla Shikhlinskaya as Asmar
- Hasan Mammadov as Ogtay
- Hasanagha Turabov as Ogtay's colleague
- Chingiz Aliloghlu as Jamal
- Mukhtar Avsharov as Postman
- Sadaya Mustafayeva as Asmar's mother
- Torekhanum Zeynalova as Neighbour

== See also ==
- Cinema of Azerbaijan
- Azerbaijani films from the 70s
