= Ramiz Hasanoglu =

Azerbaijani film director

- Born: 13 April 1949 (age 77); Yerevan
- Occupation: Film director

Ramiz Hasanoglu (Azerbaijani: Ramiz Həsənoğlu; born 13 April 1946, Yerevan, Armenian SSR) is an Azerbaijani Soviet film director; Honoured Art Worker of the Azerbaijan SSR (1989); People's Artist of Azerbaijan (2006).

== Life ==
He was born in Yerevan, the Armenian SSR, in 1949. His mother is Ataya Aliyeva, who was an "Honoured Artist of the Azerbaijan SSR". His father, Hasan Mirzayev, was also an art worker and "Honoured Art Worker of the Azerbaijan SSR".

Since 1966, he has been an assistant director at Azerbaijan Television. In 1971, he graduated from the Azerbaijan State University of Culture and Arts, and in 1978 from the directing department of the Leningrad Institute of Theatre, Music and Cinema. Ramiz Hasanoghli is the author of many favourite Azerbaijani TV plays, such as: "Distressed Piano", "Ordan-burdan" ("From Here to There"), "On the Train", "Evleri kondalan yar", "The Man in Green Glasses". He also screened the works of Azerbaijani writer Anar - "You, I, He and the Telephone", "The Century Revives Us", "Anxiety". In total, he directed more than 50 films and TV plays, as well as more than 200 TV programmes. In 1989 he was awarded the title of Honoured Art Worker of the Azerbaijan SSR. In 2000, the film "Family", created in co-authorship with Rustam Ibragimbekov, was awarded the main prize of the Eurasian Festival held in Moscow. Since 1993, Ramiz Hasanoglu has been the head of the Sabah creative association at the Azerbaijan State Television. Since 2019, he was also head of the "Azerbaycantelefilm".
