= Mirza Babayev =

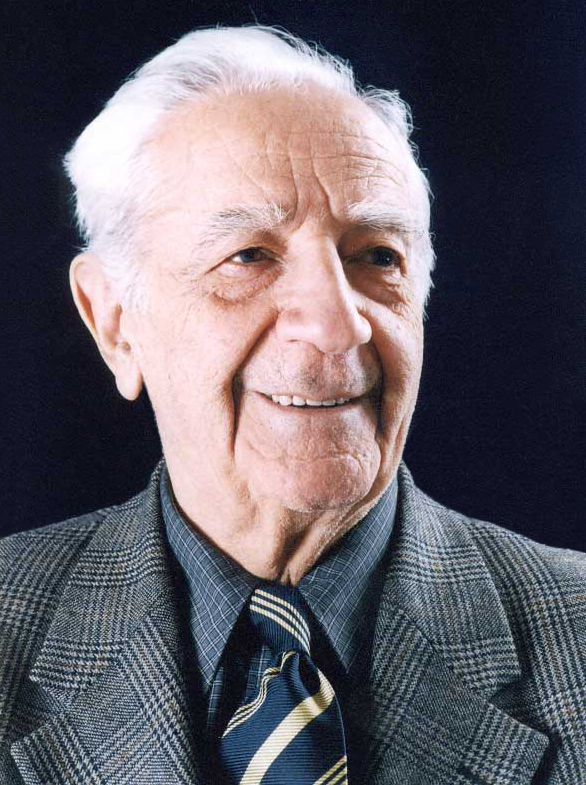

Background information
- Born: 16 July 1913; Baku, Russian Empire
- Died: 14 January 2003 (aged 89) Baku, Azerbaijan
- Occupations: Movie actor, singer

Mirza Abduljabbar oglu Babayev (Azerbaijani: Mirzə Əbdülcabbar oğlu Babayev; 16 July 1913 – 14 January 2003) was an Azerbaijani movie actor and singer. He was awarded the title Honored Artist of the Azerbaijan SSR (1956) and People's Artist of Azerbaijan (1992).

== Biography ==
Mirza Babayev was born on 16 July 1913 in Baku, into a family of an oil agent. His mother, Sona Khanim Khanlarova, was a member of the bey family. He got his primary education at an art school. In 1939, he graduated from Azerbaijan State Oil Academy. In 1948, Mirza Babayev entered Azerbaijan State Conservatoire, where he studied in the class of Bulbul and in 1953, he graduated from there with a vocal specialty.

== Title and awards ==
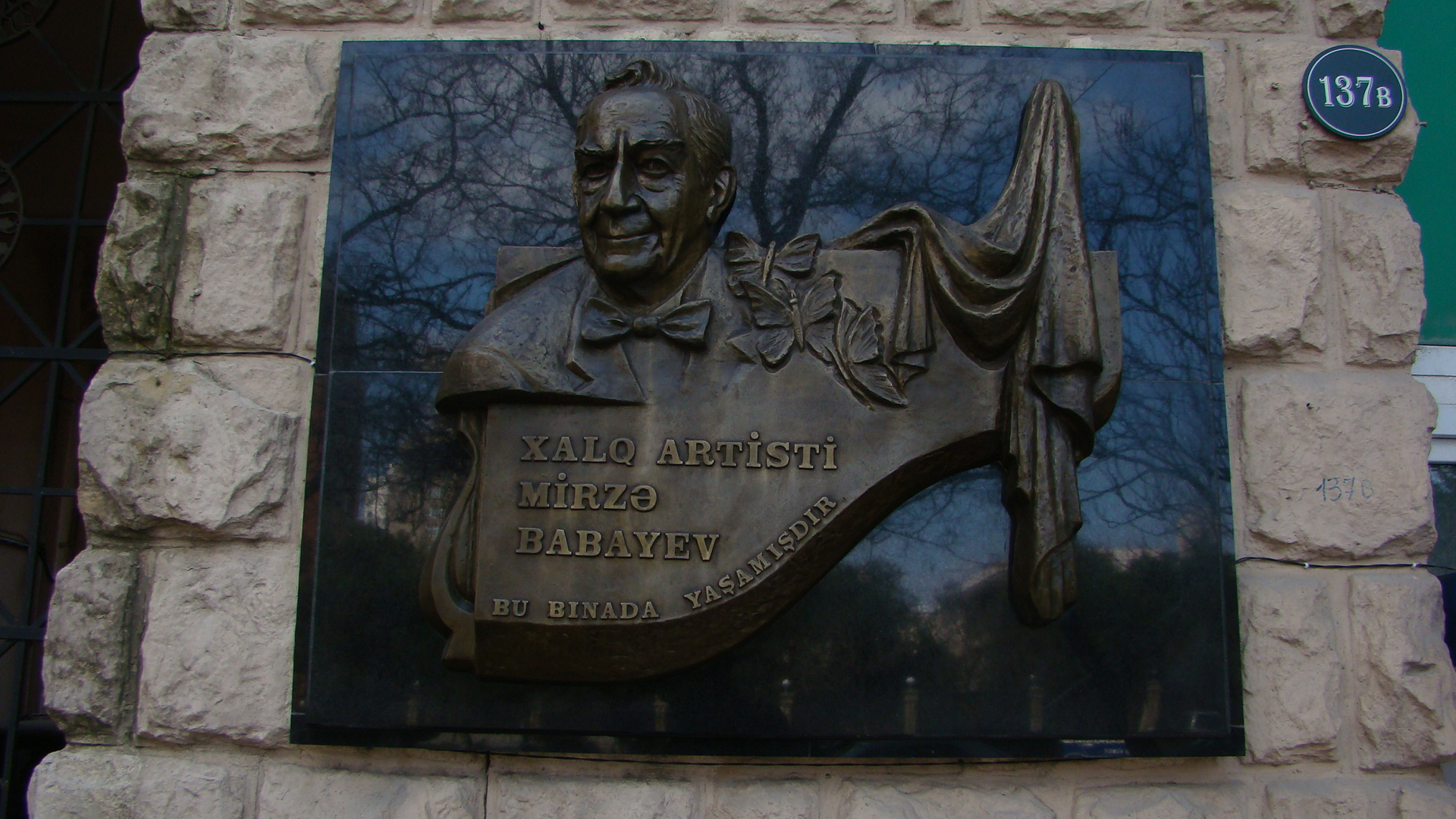
Memorial plaque of Mirza Babayev on Samad Vurgun street

- Honored Artist of the Azerbaijan SSR (1956)
- People's Artist of Azerbaijan (1992)
- Shohrat Order (2002)
- Humay Award (2 times)

== Filmography ==
- 1956 – Not that one, then this one (film)
- 1966 – Gipsy girl – Selim bey
- 1966 – 26 commissioners of Baku
- 1966 – Why are you silent?
- 1969 – The indomitable Kura
- 1976 – The Darvish Detonates Paris – Dervish Mesteli Shah
- 1977 – Magic voice of Jelsomino – Chief of prison
- 1981 – Don't worry, I'm with you – Farzali bey
- 1985 – Summer season
- 1990 – Don't meddle in, it will kill!
- 1991 – Hello from the next world
