= Khuraman Hajiyeva =

Azerbaijani actor

Khuraman Hajiyeva Xuraman Hacıyeva
- Born: March 7, 1945; Baku, Azerbaijan SSR, USSR
- Died: February 15, 2005 (aged 59); Baku, Azerbaijan
- Occupation: actress
- Years active: 1965–2005
- Awards: People's Artiste of Azerbaijan (1999)

Khuraman Abdulla gizi Hajiyeva (Azerbaijani: Xuraman Abdulla qızı Hacıyeva, March 7, 1945—February 15, 2005) was an Azerbaijani actress.

== Biography ==
Khuraman Hajiyeva was born on March 7, 1945, in Baku. She participated in drama clubs from high school. In 1964, she entered the acting department of the Azerbaijan State Theater Institute. In 1966, she left her studies and went to Ganja and started working as an actress in the drama theater there. In 1972, she came to Baku and joined the troupe of the Young Spectators Theatre.

Between 1998–2001, she acted at the Nakhchivan State Musical Drama Theatre, and returned to Young Spectators Theatre.

Khuraman Hajiyeva died on February 15, 2005, in Baku.

== Awards ==
- People's Artiste of Azerbaijan — October 9, 1999
- Honored Artist of Azerbaijan — May 22, 1991
