= Huseynagha Sadigov (actor) =

Soviet actor (1914–1983)

Huseynagha Sadigov Hüseynağa Sadıqov
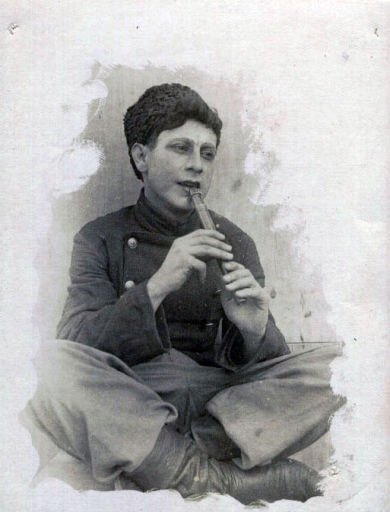
- Huseynagha Sadigov in childhood playing on tutek
- Born: March 21, 1914; Baku, Baku Governorate, Russian Empire
- Died: February 23, 1983 (aged 68); Baku, Azerbaijan SSR, USSR
- Occupation: Actor
- Years active: 1931–1983
- Awards: People's Artist of the Azerbaijan SSR Medal "For the Victory over Germany in the Great Patriotic War 1941–1945"

Huseynagha Alasgar oghlu Sadigov (Azerbaijani: Hüseynağa Ələsgər oğlu Sadıqov, March 21, 1914 – February 23, 1983) was an Azerbaijani theater and film actor. He was awarded the honorary title of People's Artiste of the Azerbaijan SSR (1979).

== Biography ==
Huseynagha Sadigov was born on March 21, 1914, in Baku. In 1930, a year after the creation of the Young Spectators Theater, he was admitted to the acting troupe of the collective for a trial period. On June 1, 1931, the actor was taken to the theater troupe. From the beginning, he was assigned responsible roles.

Huseynagha Sadigov died on February 23, 1983, in Baku. In March 2019, the 105th anniversary of Huseynagha Sadigov's birth was celebrated at the Azerbaijan State Academic Theatre of Musical Comedy.

== Awards ==
- People's Artiste of the Azerbaijan SSR – February 9, 1979
- Lenin Komsomol Prize of the Azerbaijan SSR — 1967
- Honored Artist of the Azerbaijan SSR — July 1, 1956
- Order of the Red Star — March 8, 1945
- Medal "For Courage" — September 16, 1944
- Medal "For the Defence of the Caucasus" — May 1, 1944
- Medal "For the Victory over Germany in the Great Patriotic War 1941–1945" — May 9, 1945
- Medal "For Distinguished Labour" — June 9, 1959

== Sources ==
- Azəri, L. Səhnədə gülüş — efirdə hikmət: [Gənc Tamaşaçılar Teatrında Xalq artisti Hüseynağa Sadıqovun 100 illiyinə həsr edilmiş tədbir keçirilmişdir] //Mədəniyyət.- 2014.- 23 may.- S. 5.
- Kazımzadə, A. Piri babanın nağılları: Hüseynağa Sadıqov – 100 //Mədəni həyat.- 2014.- No. 4.- S.76–79.
- Mükərrəmoğlu, M. Görkəmli sənətkar, parlaq istedad sahibi: Hüseynağa Sadıqov – 100 //Xalq qəzeti.- 2014.- 25 may.- S.7.
