= Rasim Balayev =

Azerbaijani actor (1948–2026)

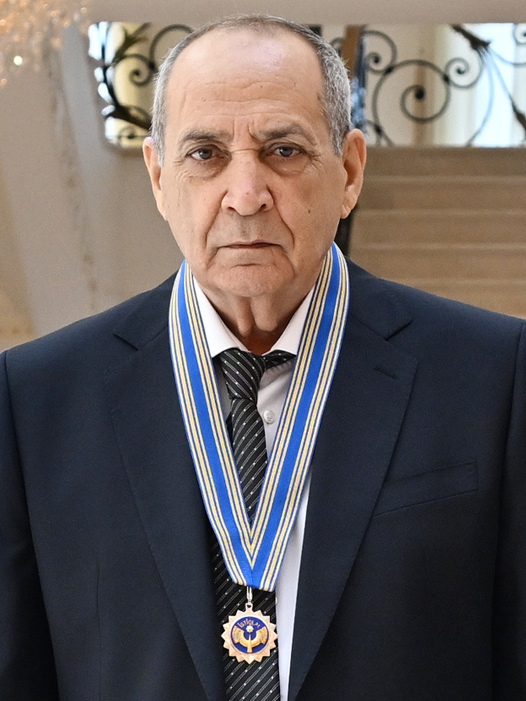
- Balayev in 2023
- Born: 8 August 1948; Agsu, Azerbaijani SSR, Soviet Union
- Died: 29 March 2026 (aged 77); Istanbul, Turkey
- Occupation: Actor
- Years active: 1970–2026

Rasim Ahmed oglu Balayev (Azerbaijani: Rasim Əhməd oğlu Balayev; 8 August 1948 – 29 March 2026) was an Azerbaijani film and stage actor. He starred in the leading roles in more than 60 Azerbaijani films.

== Early life ==
Balayev was born on 8 August 1948 in the Agsu Rayon of Soviet Azerbaijan. At the age of 15–16, he got involved in theater performances. Being from the rural area, Rasim's family attempted to push him to choose a different career, though he never did and got enrolled in Azerbaijani Institute of Arts, from which he graduated in 1969.

== Career ==
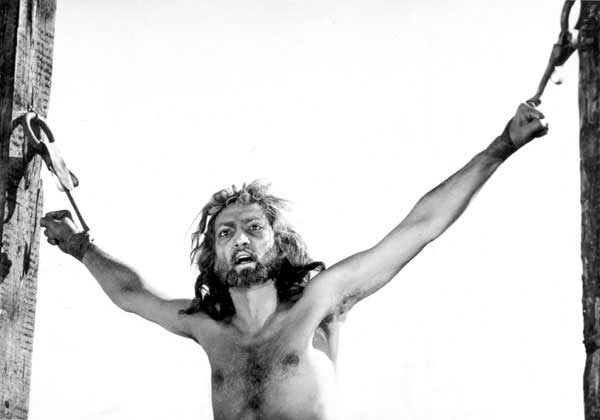
Balayev as Imadaddin Nasimi in the film Nasimi (1973)

Balayev's first film experience on the big screen came with a short role in the film "Stars don't die away". His fame came after his part in three movies and participation in two film festivals: the seventh Soviet festival in Baku and third International festival in Tashkent where he received an award for Best Actor and several proposals for main roles in future movies. Among his best performances are films Nesimi (about Nasimi), Babek, Dada Gorgud, The Scoundrel, Anecdote, and The Bat.

== Personal life and death ==
In 2012, Balayev campaigned to stop male violence against women.

He died of complications from diabetes and lung cancer on 29 March 2026, at a hospital in Istanbul where he had been receiving treatment. He was 77.

== Awards ==
- Best Actor
- Award of Lenin's Komsomol
- Shohrat Order (1998)
- Sharaf Order (2018)
- Medal of Nesimi (2020)
- Istiglal Order (2023)

== Filmography ==
- Unusual Hunt (1974)
- Nasimi (1974)
- The Scoundrel (1974)
- Anecdote (1974)
- Dada Gorgud (1975)
- Babek (1979)
- Additional Trace (1981)
- The Bat (1995)
- Fortress (2008)
