= Jamil Alibekov =

Azerbaijani writer (1927–2014)

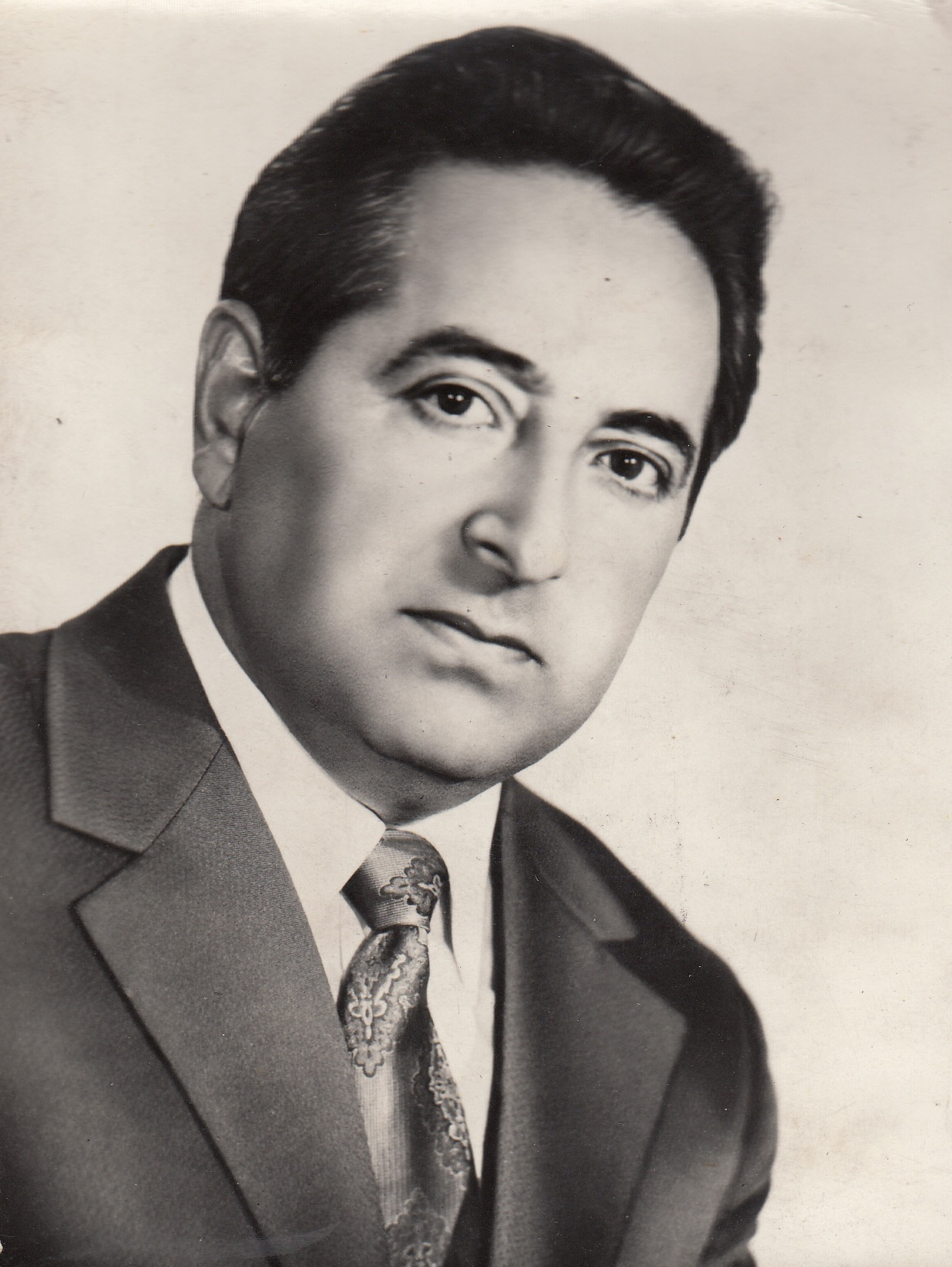
- Jamil Alibekov
- Born: 5 December 1927; Fuzuli, Azerbaijan
- Died: 26 October 2014 (aged 86)
- Occupation: Writer

Jamil Alibekov (5 December 1927; Fuzuli, Azerbaijan – 26 October 2014) was an Azerbaijani writer and public figure. He is the author of more than 40 works. For twenty years he worked in responsible positions in the media and he was favorite person among young people. He had travelled to four countries of the continent, and his essays written from the United States, Turkey, United Kingdom, Russia (Siberia), Austria, Iran and others countries that he visited, was cause of the interest.

== Biography ==
Jamil Alibekov (Full name: Jamil Alibekov Adil oglu) was born on 5 December 1927 in Fuzuli district of the Republic of Azerbaijan. He graduated from the University of Azerbaijan and began to work in “ Azerbaijan Youth” newspaper in 1949. He worked in this newspaper for 20 years in different positions such as a literary worker, head of department, responsible secretary and chief editor in last two years. In 1970 J. Alibekov was appointed to the position of an assistant chairman of the Committee of Azerbaijan Radio and Television Programs. He established a lot of favorite programs such as “ Bulaq” during the four years when he worked in the television. In 1974 he was appointed to the position of director of film studio “ Azerbaijanfilm” . Films made in his position years were highly appreciated and won awards in the international and national levels. Films such as “"Dede Korkud", "Babek", "Fakir blows Paris" (Dərviş Dərviş Parisi partladır), " Pipe voice" (Tütək səsi), "Investigation" (İstintaq"), " Birthday" (Ad günü), " Mother-in-law"(Qayınana), "Papakh" included into Gold Fund.

== Works ==
- The founders of the city
- First steps
- Labour and heroism
- City creators
- For love
- Your wealth
- There is my name in four continents
- My motherly world
- In the search of myself
- The first love (novel)
- Winter adventure (novel)
- Nigar`s dream
- Three sisters
