= Rauf Khalilov =

Azerbaijani film director, composer, and producer

Rauf Khalilov Azad oglu (born October 6, 1981 Baku, Azerbaijan) is a film director, composer, designer and producer. He is a member of the Directors Guild of Azerbaijan.

== Biography ==
In 1998 Rauf Khalilov graduated from the Azerbaijan State Academy of Fine Arts named after A. N. Alekperov, majoring in Music and Art. Since an early age, Rauf was also interested in mechanical engineering and astronomy which had a huge impact on his further work.

In 2002 Rauf Khalilov graduated from the Azerbaijan State Academy of Fine Arts with a bachelor's degree in Graphics.

Rauf is married and has one child. His father Azad Khalilov is a well-known painter of Azerbaijan.

== Films and music ==
Genres of Movies: drama, thriller.

Having made his first short film "One Minute and Four Seconds" in 2003 Rauf Khalilov began his career as a film director. He continued his career by making few other short films. Among them: "The Chairs" and "Stability". He directed his first feature movie "Ideal World" in Los Angeles in 2008. As a composer of electronic music in 2009 he released his first album "Monopolar World", followed by other well-known singles such as "Venus", "Good Morning Apollo" and "Out of Milky Way".

=== Video-Art ===
- 2002 – Orientalism
- 2003 – Desire
- 2004 – Exit
- 2004 – 3Days
- 2004 – Leadership and Power
- 2005 – Universal Game
- 2007 – Gravity Life
- 2007 – Morning Starts at 0:01 am

=== Short films ===
- 2003 – One Minute and Four Seconds
- 2010 – The Chairs
- 2011 – Stability

=== Feature film ===
- 2008 – Ideal World (Release in 2012) Los Angeles

== Exhibitions and festivals ==
- 2000 Wings of Time, Azerbaijan
- 2000 Azerbaijan State Art Academy, Azerbaijan
- 2001 Azerbaijan Artists Union "Young Artists Exhibition"
- 2001 UNOCAL Ecology Poster Exhibition, Azerbaijan
- 2002 Orientalism: Inside & Outside. International Exhibition, Azerbaijan
- 2003 "Aluminium" Art+New Technoligies Festival of Contemporary Art, Azerbaijan
- 2003 "Appendix" International Art Exhibition, Tbilisi, Georgia
- 2004 International Short Film Festival "Oberhausen", Germany
- 2004 IV International Audiovisual Festival, Azerbaijan
- 2005 International Short Film Festival "Detmold", Germany
- 2007 52nd International Art Exhibition - La Biennale Di Venezia, Italy
- 2007 "Realities of Dreams" Aluminium 3rd International Biennial of Contemporary Art, Azerbaijan
- 2008 “NYIIFVF” New York International Independent Film and Video Festival, United States
- 2008 “STEPS of Time” Exhibition, Dresden, Germany
- 2010 “USSR-remix” project of visual art, photography, video-art and multimedia, Norway
- 2011 “Festival de Cannes, the Short Film Corner”, France
- 2012 "Festival de Cannes, the Short Film Corner", France
- 2013 "Azerbaijani family" film Festival, Azerbaijan

== Music ==
Genres of Music: – Ambient, Downtempo, Dub, Electro
