= Tofig Ismayilov (film director) =

Tofiq Ismayilov (6 April 1939 – 25 March 2016) was an Azerbaijani film director, screenwriter and film scholar.

Ismayilov directed over 30 films, including documentaries and starred in several films. From 2007, he lectured in the Azerbaijani State University of Culture and Art. As a scholar, Ismayilov authored the encyclopedia The Cinema History of Turkic People. His articles were published in over fifty Turkish newspapers and journals.

== Biography ==
He worked on the AzTV channel. Ismayilov graduated from the Department of Directing at the Theater Institute. He became its director in 1974. He worked at the Mimar Sinan Fine Arts University in Turkey from 1994 to 2006. In 2007, he began teaching at the Azerbaijan State University of Culture and Art.

Tofik Ismayilov died on March 25, 2016, in Baku after a long illness. His grave is located in the Yasamal cemetery.
