= Latif Safarov =

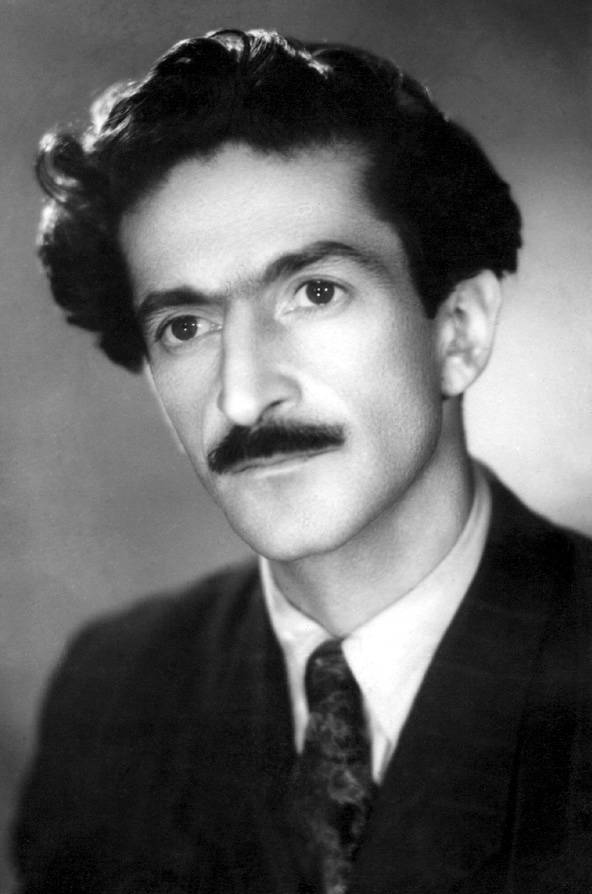
Latif Safarov

Latif Bashir oglu Safarov (Azerbaijani: Lətif Səfərov) (30 September 1920, Shusha – 9 December 1963, Baku) was an Azerbaijani actor and movie director.

== Biography ==
Safarov began his career in acting at a very young age. He starred in a number of children's movies released in 1927–1931 (Sevil, Latif, etc.). In 1939, he graduated from the Ganja School of Pedagogy. For the next two years was continued acting along as serving as an assistant director at the Baku Movie Studio (renamed to Azerbaijanfilm in 1960). In 1950, he graduated from the Gerasimov Institute of Cinematography, receiving B.A. in Film Directing.

The 1955 film Bakhtiyar (starring Rashid Behbudov) directed by Safarov was his most significant project. It was followed by two other well-known films, Under the sultry sky (1957) and Leyli and Majnun (1962). In 1958, Safarov was elected head of the Azerbaijani Union of Cinematographers. He was granted the emeritus title of the Honorary Art Worker of Azerbaijan in 1960. In 1955, he married singer Shovkat Alakbarova. Together they had two children.

In 1963, Safarov committed suicide by shooting himself with a hunting rifle. At that time, he was working on his film project The Island of Miracles.
