= Farman Karimzade =

Farman Ismayil oglu Karimzade Fərman İsmayıl oğlu Kərimzadə Керимзаде, Фарман Исмаил оглы
- Born: March 3, 1937; Boyuk Vedi, Armenia, USSR
- Died: March 17, 1989 (aged 52); Baku, Azerbaijan, USSR
- Occupations: Writer, screenwriter, film director, film producer.

Farman Ismayil oglu Karimzade (Azerbaijani: Fərman İsmayıl oğlu Kərimzadə; March 3, 1937 – March 17, 1989) was an Azerbaijani writer, screenwriter, film director and film producer.

== Biography ==
Farman Karimzade was born on March 3, 1937, in the village of Boyuk Vedi, Vedin region of Armenia. In 1944–1951 there he received primary education and in 1954 he graduated from high school in the village of Shahsevan, Beylagan District. In 1949, he was deported from his native village to Beylagan city with his family (then the city was called Zhdanov). In 1955, he entered the State Art school named after Azim Azimzade. Later he worked in Beylagan as a teacher. From 1962 to 1965, he studied at All-Russian State University of Cinematography named after S.A.Gerasimov, in Moscow. After graduating from the university he worked as a translator, managed a department at "Absheron" newspaper and in 1966–1970's, he worked at "Literatura i kultura" ("Literature and culture") magazine. In 1970–1977's he was a member of the board of "Azerbaijanfilm" film studio and was a member of Azerbaijan Union of Writers since 1968.

In 1958, "Size 41 shoes" narrative was published by the writer. This was one of the first attempts of the writer, but despite that, it was full of appeals and freethinking ideas. "The last exhibit" (Azerbaijani: Sonuncu eksponat; 1961) and "A wedding sheep" works were also dedicated to the Great Patriotic War. "The last exhibit" narrative is a touching story about a poor mother who lost her son in the war. Now seeing in the museum her son's shirt, sewed by her, the mother feels pain, because custodians of the museum have yet looked after the exhibits and her lovely son's shirt is fully moth-eaten.

The 1980s were the most productive years in Farman Karimzade's literary creativity. Mainly he wrote about historical themes: among Farman Karimzade’s novels are – “Khudaferin bridge" (Azerbaijani: Xudafərin körpüsü; 1981), "Battle of Chaldiran" (Azerbaijani: Çaldıran döyüşü; 1984–1985, about the Safavid – Ottoman war and Shah Ismayil Khatai's life), "Tabriz's pride", "Old eagle's death" (1988), "Snowy pass" (1986–1987).

Farman Karimzade also worked as a film director in the sphere of cinematography and was the editor in shootings of such films as "Shovkat Alakbarova is singing" (1970), "The last pass" (1971), "Stone suffers" (1973), "Voice of a pipe" (1975), "Dervish is exploding Paris" (1976), "The shah and a servant" (1976) and others. Scenarios of such films as "The last pass" (1971), "Bell" (1973), "Four Sundays" (1974) and "My wife, my children" (1978) belong to him.

He died of a heart attack in 1989 at the age of 52 in Baku.

== Works or publications ==
- Size 41 shoes: Narrative, 1958.
- The last exhibit: Novel. Baku: 1961.
- Snowy pass: Novel. Baku: 1971.
- Khudaferin bridge: Novel. Baku: Yazichi, 1982, 382 p.
- Battle of Chaldiran: Novel. Baku: 1988.
- Tabriz's pride: Novel.
- Old eagle's death: Novel. Baku: 1991.

== Filmography ==
=== Director work ===
- 1970 — Shovkat Alakbarova is singing
- 1971 — The last pass
- 1973 — Our street guys
- 1973 — Stone suffers
- 1975 — Voice of a pipe
- 1976 — Dervish is exploding Paris
- 1976 — The shah and a servant

=== Screenwriting ===
- 1971 — The last pass
- 1973 — Bell
- 1975 — Four Sundays
- 1978 — My wife, my children

== See also ==
- Ali bey Huseynzade
- Alexandre Michon
- Cinema of the Russian Empire
- Cinema of Azerbaijan
