= Mukhtar Maniyev =

Soviet actor (1935–2016)

- Muxtar Maniyev
- Born: 4 April 1935; Baku, Azerbaijan SSR, Soviet Union
- Died: 22 December 2016 (aged 81); Baku, Azerbaijan
- Occupation: Actor

Mukhtar Gambar oghlu Maniyev (Azerbaijani: Muxtar Qəmbər oğlu Maniyev; 4 April 1935 – 22 December 2016) was an Azerbaijani actor, People's Artiste of Azerbaijan (2000).

== Biography ==
Mukhtar Maniyev was born in 1935 in Baku. After graduating as an engineer at the Petrochemical Institute, he submitted his documents to the Azerbaijan State Institute of Arts and began his second level of education.

Mukhtar Maniyev appeared in 157 films. He worked in the theater studio operating under the "Azerbaijanfilm" film studio.

On 22 December 2016, Maniyev, who suffered from diabetes, died.

== Awards ==
- People's Artiste of Azerbaijan — 18 December 2000
- Honored Artist of the Azerbaijan SSR — 1 December 1982
