= Rasim Ojagov =

Azerbaijani film director

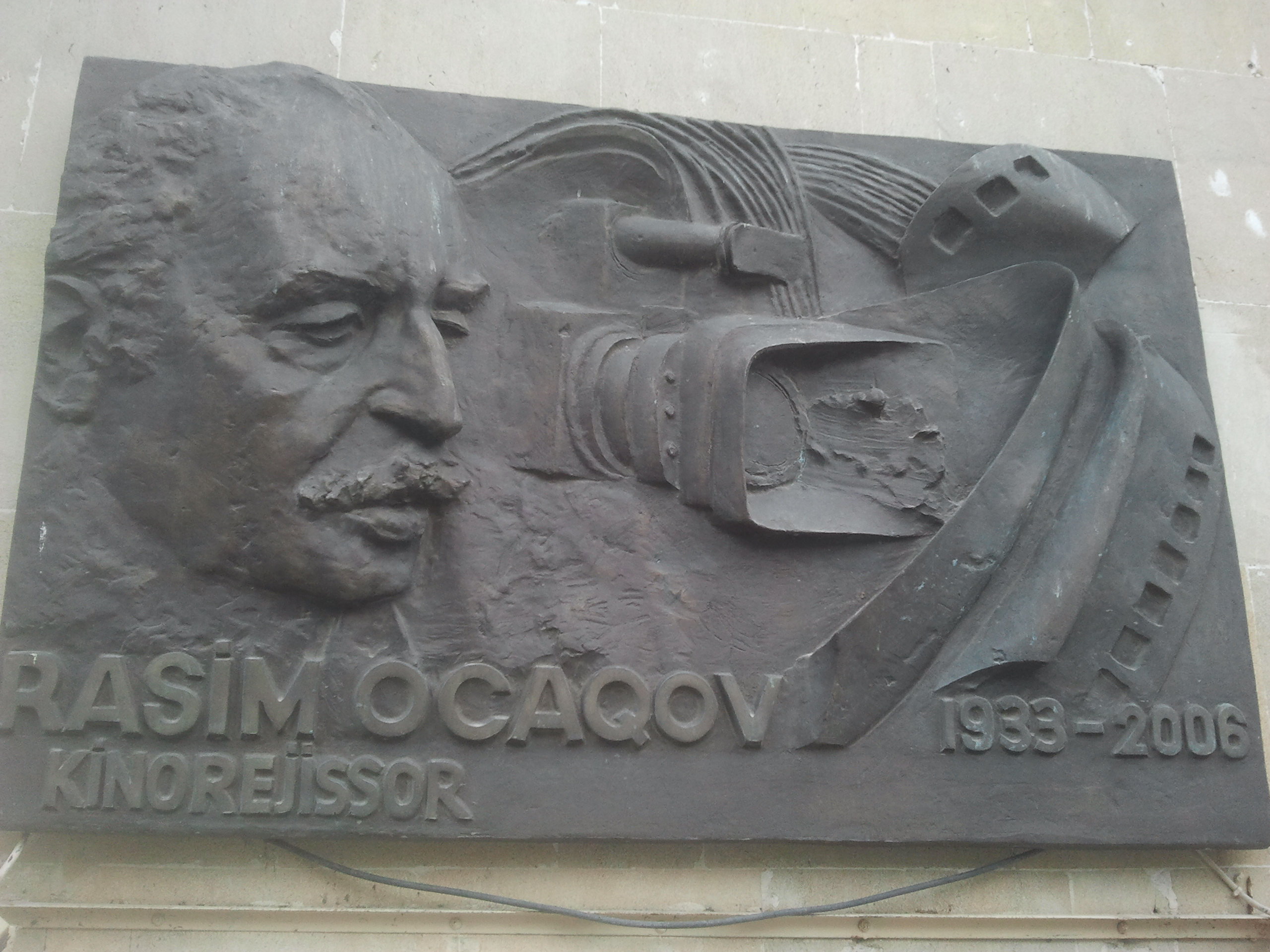
- Plaque on building where Azerbaijani film director and director of photography Rasim Ojagov lived in Baku
- Born: 22 November 1933; Shaki, Azerbaijani SSR, USSR
- Died: 11 July 2006 (aged 72); Baku, Azerbaijan
- Citizenship: Soviet
- Occupations: film director, screenwriter and cinematographer

Rasim Ojagov (Azerbaijani: Rasim Ocaqov; 22 November 1933 – 11 July 2006) was a Soviet-Azerbaijani film director and camera operator, Honoured Art Worker of Chechen-Ingush ASSR (1964), People's Artist of the Azerbaijan SSR (1982), laureate of the State Prize of the Azerbaijan SSR.

== Biography ==
Rasim Ojagov was born on 22 November 1933 in Shaki, Azerbaijan. In his youth he dreamed of becoming a geologist. But, an appearance of a shooting group of “Azerbaijanfilm” film studio in his city made him to revise his choice of profession. After graduating from a local school in Sheki in 1951, he attended a film Institute in Moscow despite his parents' disapproval. In 1951-1956's, he studied at the camera operator faculty of VGIK.

In 1965, he studied at the director faculty of Azerbaijan Theatrical Institute named after I.Aliyev. In 1956, he worked as a camera operator-director at “Azerbaijanfilm” and in 1973, as a director. In 1964, he was conferred Honoured Art Worker of Chechen-Ingush ASSR. In 1950's, a new generation of directors, including Mukhtar Dadashov, Teyyub Akhundov, Alisattar Atakishiyev appeared. In these years Rasim Ojagov began his career. “Her great heart” film was the first film Ojagov. He was considered a professional in describing of psychological scenes. This film is about life of Sumgayit metallurgists. Mental sufferings of the workers are described in this film.

== Filmography ==
Rasim Ojagov shot about 11 multireel films.

Year	Film	Director	Camera operator
1958	Her great heart		X mark
1961	Our street	X mark	
1966	Why are you silent?	X mark	
1969	In one southern city		X mark
1971	The main interview	X mark	
1973	The first day of life	X mark	
1974	Avenger from Ganjabasar	X mark	
1977	Birthday	X mark	
1979	Interrogation	X mark	
1981	Behind the closed door	X mark	
1983	Park	X mark	
1987	The other life	X mark	
1989	Temple of air	X mark	
1990	7 days after murder	X mark	
1993	Tahmina	X mark	
1995	Both journey and trade	X mark	
1998	A hotel room	X mark	

== Awards ==
- Laureate of the State Prize of the Azerbaijan SSR (1979, for the film “Birthday”);
- Laureate of the USSR State Prize (1981, for the film “Interrogation”;
- People's Artist of Azerbaijan.
