= Hasan Mammadov =

- Həsən Məmmədov
- Born: November 22, 1938; Salyan, Azerbaijan SSR
- Died: August 26, 2003 (aged 64); Baku, Azerbaijan
- Awards: People`s Artist of Azerbaijan (1982), USSR State Award, Azerbaijan State Award

Hasan Agamammad oglu Mammadov (Azerbaijani: Həsən Ağaməmməd oğlu Məmmədov; 22 November 1938 – 26 August 2003) was a theater and cinema actor of Azerbaijan, People's Artist of Azerbaijan (1982) received USSR and Azerbaijan State Awards.

== Life ==
Hasan Mammadov was born on November 22, 1938, in the Salyan district of Azerbaijan. He graduated from secondary school No 2 in 1956 and entered the Physics-Mathematics faculty of the Azerbaijan State University (present-day Baku State University). In the second course, he left the university and for a while acted as an assistant in various theaters.

In 1962, he graduated from the Theatrical Institute of the Azerbaijan State University of Culture and Arts. He worked at the State Radio (1960-1961) at certain intervals in these years. Mammadov was assigned to the Academic National Drama Theater in 1962. Since that year he began to act in cinema. Mammadov was shot in more than 50 films.

On September 10, 1962, he became an actor of this art center. For several times he left the theater regarding with movie shootings and returned again to the theater.

Hasan Mammadov began to work in "Azerbaijanfilm" studio on February 2, 1972. On May 17, 1989, he played the role of Ilyas Ibrahimov in the play by Cemil Elibeyov's (Producer Director Agakishi Kazimov). In 1992 Mammadov was invited by the director and art director of the Academic Theater, Hasan Turabov to his collective.

The actor played the roles in the plays by Azerbaijani and European classics, contemporary Azerbaijani and foreign playwrights.

He was shot in the films "Great Support" (Garash), "Arshin mal alan" (Asker), "The Day Passed" (Oktai), "Stab in the Back!" (Gamarlinsky), "Forgive us" (Nariman) "At midnight the day after tomorrow" (Baba Aliyev), "Investigation" (Murad), "Dada Gorgud (1975, film)" (Dede Gorgud), "Last Cross" (Abbasgulu Agha Shadlinski), "Sevil" (Balash), "I want seven sons" (Bakhtiyar), "In a southern city" (Murad), "Golden goose" (Farman), "Winds are blowing in Baku" (General), "Apples are similar” (Gurban), "Investigation continues” (Azimov), "The Witness Girl" (Colonel), "Grief Window" (Mammadhasan Uncle), "Papag" (Mirza Safar), "Tahmina", "Both visit and Trade" (Alimurad), "Zirve" (Kamil).

Mammadov died on August 26, 2003, and was buried in the Second Honorary Alley.

== Awards ==
Hasan (Abulhasan) Aghamammad oghlu Mammadov was honored artist of the Republic of Azerbaijan on November 18, 1971, and people's artist on December 1, 1982. On November 5, 1981, he was awarded the State Prize of the Republic of Azerbaijan for the roles "Baba Aliyev" in the film "At midnight the day after tomorrow" (Baba Aliyev) and "Murad" in the film "Investigation". In 1970 he was a laureate of the Republican Lenin Komsomol Prize.

== See also ==
List of People's Artists of the Azerbaijan SSR
