= List of films shot in Baku =

This article lists internationally distributed films that:

- were shot on location in the city of Baku, capital of Azerbaijan;
- use the city of Baku as a set to portray other cities;
- have the story or part of the story set in Baku, but were not shot there;
- if they are animated films, they have Baku as their identifiable venue.

== Films and television series ==
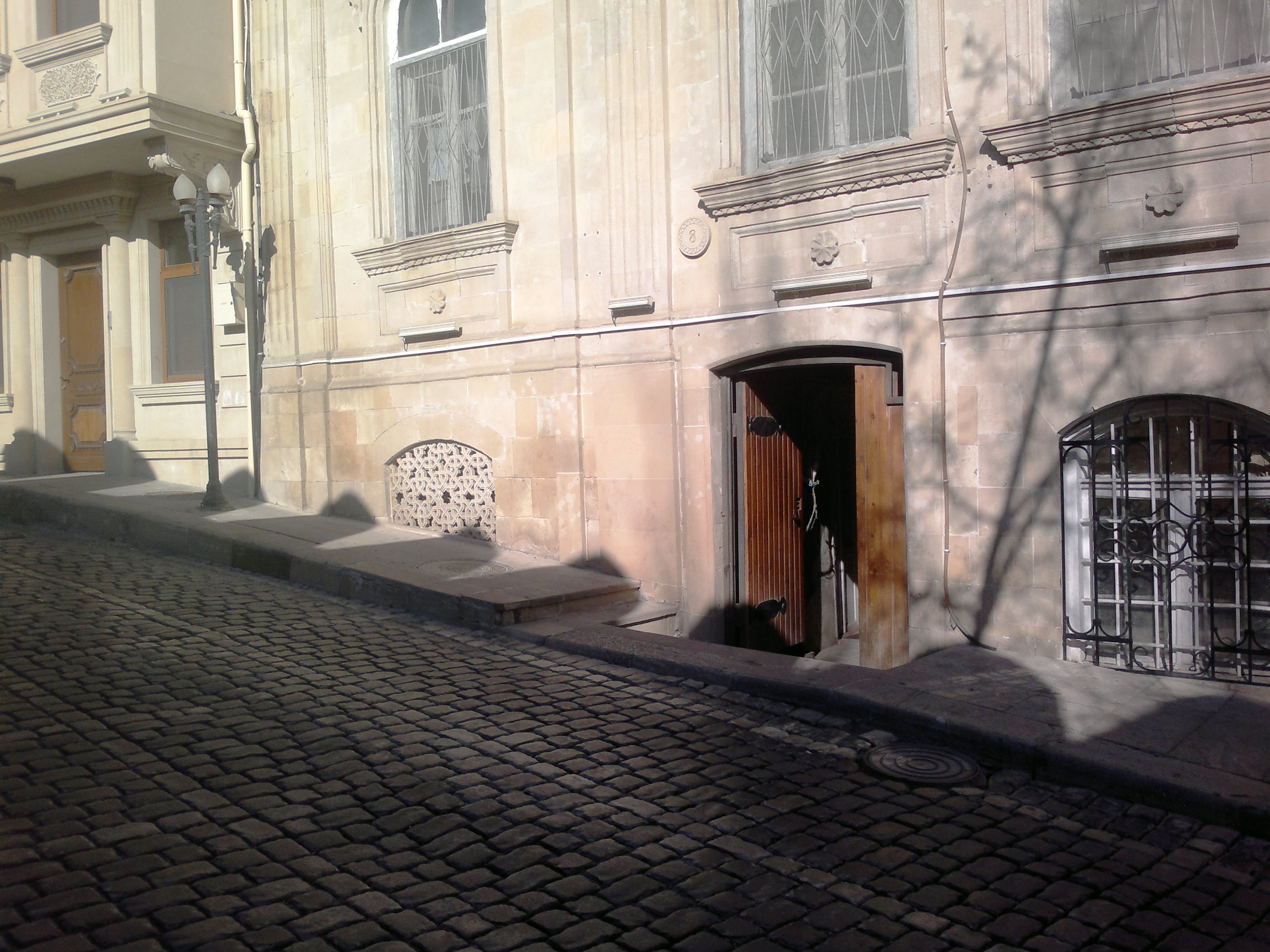
The spot in Inner city of Baku where Gorgunkov fell in the movie The Diamond Arm

- The Oil Gush Fire in Bibiheybat
- Amphibian Man
- Attack on Baku
- Balaxanı-Sabunçu polis idarəsi süvari qorodovoyların at oynatmaları
- The Diamond Arm
- Dolu
- In the kingdom of oil and millions
- The Life of Bakuvians and Their Movement Along the Velikokniaz Avenue
- Oil Extraction
- The Oil Gush Fire in Bibiheybat
- The Oil Gush in Balakhany
- Train Entering the Railroad Station
- The Twelve Chairs (1971 film)
- The Headless Horseman (1972 movie)
- Teheran 43
- Try Not to Breathe
- Work at Oil Derricks
- The World Is Not Enough
- Xoca
- Mahmut & Meryem 2013
- Ali and Nino (film)
- Action (2019 film)
- The Gray Man (2022 film)
- Layla Majnun (film)
- Vivant (TV series)
- Ruslaan 2024
- The Gorge 2025
- Vidaamuyarchi 2025
- Taghiyev: Oil
- Armour of God IV
