= List of Azerbaijani films before 1920 =

A list of films produced from 1898 to 1919 in the Republic of Azerbaijan, which at the time consisted of governorates that were part of the Russian Empire (1898–1918) and then the Azerbaijan Democratic Republic (1918–1919).

== 1898–1908 ==
Title	Director	Cast	Genre	Notes
1898
Balaxanıda neft fontanı The Oil Gush in Balakhany	Alexander Mishon			
Ilişdin; You Stumbled	Alexander Mishon		Short Feature	
Balaxanı-Sabunçu polis idarəsi süvari qorodovoyların at oynatmaları	Alexander Mishon			Shot on 35 mm
Bibiheybətdə neft fontanı yanğını The Oil Gush Fire in Bibiheybat	Alexander Mishon			
Əlahəzrət Buxara əmirinin Velikiy Knyaz Aleksey paroxodunda yolasalma mərasimi Farewell Ceremony for His Majesty Emir of Bukhara on "Velikiy Kniaz Alexei" Steamboat	Alexander Mishon			
Qafqaz rəqsi The Folk Dance of Caucasus	Alexander Mishon			
Qafqaz və Merkuri cəmiyyətinin paroxodunun limandan yola düşməsi	Alexander Mishon			
Qatarın dəmiryol stansiyasına daxil olması Train Entering the Railroad Station	Alexander Mishon			
Şəhər bağında xalq gəzintisi	Alexander Mishon			
1900
Bakı camaatının həyatı və Velikoknyaz Prospekti ilə hərəkəti The Life of Bakuvians and Their Movement Along the Velikokniaz Avenue	Q. Matye			
Bakı əhalisinin şəhər bağında gəzintisi Bakuvians Walk in the City Park	Q. Matye			
1907
Bakı Bazarlarının Tipləri; Types of Bakuvian Bazaars	Vasil Amashukeli			short documentary
Daş Kömür Daşınması; Transportation of Coal	Vasil Amashukeli			
Dəniz kənarında gəzinti Seaside Walk	Vasil Amashukeli			
Neft buruqlarında iş Work at Oil Derricks	Vasil Amashukeli			
Neftin çıxarılması Oil Extraction	Vasil Amashukeli			
1908
Ağ və qara şəhər The White and Black City				
Balaxanı; Balakhany (1908 film)				
Nobelin zavodları Nobel's Factories				

== 1910s ==
Title	Director	Cast	Genre	Notes
1915
A New-Style Old Story				
1916
Neft ve Milyonlar Seltenetinde; In the Realm of Oil and Millions				
Arvad; The Wife				
Arvadlar Ərlərini Mənsəbə Necə Çatdırırlar				
Barefoot Love				
Prince Demir Bulat				
An Hour Before Death				(Tammetrajlı Bədii Film)
1917
Arşın Mal Alan; The Cloth Peddler	Boris Svetlov	Huseynqulu Sarabski, Ahmed Aghdamski, Mirzagha Aliyev	Comedy	Based on Uzeyir Hajibeyov's famous same-titled operetta
Bakıda xalq azadlığı bayramı National Freedom Holiday in Baku				
Qazma və Neft Hasilatı				
Bakı komissarının mitinqdə çıxışı The Public Speech of the Baku Commissar				
1919
The Celebration of the Anniversary of Azerbaijani Independence				
The History of One Humiliation				
