= Arshin Mal Alan =

Arshin Mal Alan may refer to:

- Arshin Mal Alan (operetta)
- a 1917 film more commonly known in English as The Cloth Peddler
- a 1945 film more commonly known in English as The Cloth Peddler
- Arshin Mal Alan (1965 film)
