= Alisattar Atakishiyev =

Cinematographer and film director

- Əlisəttar Ələsgər oğlu Atakişiyev
- Born: December 25, 1906; Baku, Azerbaijan
- Died: November 7, 1990 (aged 83)
- Occupations: Cameraman, Screenwriter, Artist
- Notable work: The Cloth Peddler (1945 film), On Distant Shores, The Magic Gown
- Awards: Honoured Art Worker of the Azerbaijan Soviet Socialist Republic (1960)

Alisattar Alasgar oghlu Atakishiyev (Azerbaijani: Əlisəttar Ələsgər oğlu Atakişiyev; 25 December 1906 – 7 November 1990) was an Azerbaijani and Soviet cameraman, screenwriter and artist, an Honoured Art Worker of the Azerbaijan Soviet Socialist Republic (1960), and director of children's science fiction films.

== Biography ==
Alisattar Atakishiyev was born on 25 December 1906 in Baku. From childhood, he became interested in drawing and in 1927, he left for Moscow, where he entered the All-Union Art and Technical School. In 1930, after graduating from college, he returned to Baku, and got a job as a graphic designer at a film studio. After working for only a year at this job, he decided to enter the camera department of the All-Union State Institute of Cinematography. After graduating from the institute in 1936, Alisattar Atakishiyev remained in Moscow and began working at Mosfilm.

In 1938, director Viktor Turin, invited Atakishiyev to the Baku Film Studio, to be the cameraman of the film Baku People. In 1943, Atakishiyev worked as a director of photography in the film A Family. In 1944, a decision was made to film the musical comedy by Uzeyir Hajibeyov The Cloth Peddler. Alisattar Atakishiyev and Mukhtar Dadashev were approved as directors of photography for the film. The film was a great success and went around movie screens all over the world. In 1947, he worked as a director of photography in the film Fatali Khan. This film was banned, and only 10 years later was released to the screens in the second edition. After that, documentary films Soviet Azerbaijan, Morning Song (1950), Health Centers in Azerbaijan (1951), To the Native People (1954) were shot.

In 1956, Huseyn Seyidzadeh invited Atakishiyev to work on If Not That One, Then This One, the adaptation of Uzeyir Gadzhibekov's famous musical comedy operetta If Not That One, Then This One. Atakishiyev was officially appointed not only as the chief operator, but also as a costume designer.

Together with director Tofik Tagizadeh, the film On Distant Shores was shot, which was released in 1958. In the same year, he first acted as a director in the film The Secret of a Fortress, staged according to the script of Mammadhuseyn Tahmasib.

In 1961 Atakishiyev directed the film Our Street. In 1964, he made the film The Magic Gown, which became a favorite for a whole generation of children in the 1960s.

In 1970, A. Atakishiyev's book The Adventures of Ibrahim was published, intended for children.

Atakishiyev died on 7 November 1990 at the age of 84 in Moscow. He was buried at the Kuntsevo Cemetery.

== Sources ==
- Azerbaijani Soviet Encyclopedia, Volume 1.
- Азербайджанские известия. 15 июля 2006 года. стр. 3.
