= List of Georgian films before 1920 =

This is a list of the earliest films produced in the cinema of Georgia between 1909 and 1919, ordered by year of release:

Title	Director	Cast	Genre	Studio/notes
1909
Berikaoba-Keenoba	Aleqsandre Tsutsunava		Documentary	
1910
1911
1912
Akaki Tsereteli trip to Racha-Lechkhumi	Vasil Amashukeli		Documentary	
1913
1914
1915
1916
Qristine	Aleqsandre Tsutsunava	Antonine Abelishvili, Vaso Arabidze, Vaso Abashidze	Drama	The first Georgian fiction movie. Partially lost
1917
1918
1919
