= Azerbaijan State Film Fund =

Azerbaijani government organization

Azerbaijan Republic State Film Fund
- Azərbaycan Respublikası Dövlət Film Fondu
- Abbreviation: ARSFF / ARDFF
- Founded at: Baku, Azerbaijan
- Location: Baku, Azerbaijan
- Website: http://filmfond.az/

The Azerbaijan State Film Fund is a public fund for support of the film industry and the preservation of film history.

It was established on December 22, 1993 by the order of Cabinet of Ministers of Azerbaijan in Baku and has been operating since 1994. In 1999 the ASFF was elected a member of the International Federation of Film Archives (FIAF).

The Fund operates according to the recommendations of the International Federation of Film Archives and in accordance with international standards. The Azerbaijan State Film Foundation, maintains regular contact with the headquarters of the Federation in Brussels.

== Mission ==
The Azerbaijan State Film Fund operates in 5 main areas:

- Restoration and protection of films
- Promotion of national and foreign cinema
- Collection of archival materials
- Carrying out of scientific-research works
- Work on international relations

== Library ==
At the Azerbaijan State Film Fund, 64,372 film materials, approximately 20,000 different photographic documents, 14,000 original documents, exhibits and materials (literary and directorial scripts of films, mounting sheets, diplomas, and prizes are stored.

The first chronicle of the Azerbaijani national cinema shot 119 years ago ("The Oil Gush Fire in Bibiheybat", "The Oil Gush in Balakhany"), was brought from the French Film Archive and is retained by the ARDFF. In 2008, the Film Fund began publishing books and "Cinema Bulletin" talking about protected works every year.

The fund has more than 12,000 photos of cinema history. Hundreds of fiction, documentary, scientific, mass, animation films (Including Maiden Tower (1924), Bismillah (1925), Sevil (1929), Latif (1930), Ismat (1934), By the Bluest of Seas (1935), Almaz (1936), Baku People (1938), Villagers (1939), Sabuhi (1941), The Cloth Peddler (1945 and 1962), Fatali Khan (1947), The Lights of Baku (1950), Bakhtiar (1955), If Not This One, Then That One (1956)), along with foreign films dubbed into Azerbaijani. Satirical magazine Mozalan and others, originals and copies of 11,100 Azerbaijani and world cinematographic works are stored by the fund. In addition to the films, the Fund's archives keep records of documents of filmmakers, their manuscripts, documentary material and materials related to film production, movie literary scripts, mounting sheets, director scripts, diplomas and prizes.

== Promotion ==
One of the main directions of the State Film Fund is the promotion of national and foreign films. Creative evenings and anniversary events, of cinema figures are held. Film catalogs are published in Azerbaijani, Russian and English, including electronic versions.

Photo files of Gara Garayev, Fikret Amirov, Niyazi, Tofig Guliyev and Muslim Magomayev are brought to the Foundation from the Russian Federation, Canada, Georgia and other countries. From the Ukrainian Simferopol Archives, copies of documents by one of the first Azerbaijani film actors, Khayri Amirzadeh, and from the United States, archival documents of the first Azerbaijani actress Izzet Orujova, documents related to the shooting of Sevil (1929) were included in the Fund. During the search, several missing and rare silent films were discovered: In exchange (1925), The House on the Volcano (1928), Two Friend (1934), Naughty Team (1937) and other cinolents.

Scenes from the film Be Ready, directed by Mikayil Mikayilov at the Azerfilm film studio in 1939 (a short video made by Pate), features women's fashions in the late 19th century and the famous "Yablochko" dance by the Nikitchenko brothers, were found and donated to the fund.

== Museum ==
There is also a museum in the fund. There are interesting exhibits of the cinema, gifts from foreign guests to the Film Fund, personal archives of famous people, the personal possessions of some directors, etc. protected. At the end of 2009, for the first time in Azerbaijan, the ARSFF opened the Children's Cinema House with the support of the Heydar Aliyev Foundation.
