= Our Teacher Jabish =

- Directed by: Hasan Seyidbeyli
- Written by: Magsud Ibrahimbeyov
- Starring: Suleyman Alaskerov; Shafiga Mammadova; Mukhtar Maniyev; Safura Ibrahimova; Nasiba Zeynalova; Aliagha Aghayev
- Cinematography: Mammadagha Huseynov
- Music by: Emin Sabitoglu
- Production company: Azerbaijanfilm
- Release date: 1969
- Country: Soviet Union
- Languages: Azerbaijani, Russian

Our Teacher Jabish (Azerbaijani: Bizim Cəbiş Müəllim, Russian: Я помню тебя, учитель) is a 1969 Soviet Azerbaijani war comedy-drama film directed by Hasan Seyidbeyli and written by Magsud Ibrahimbeyov. Produced by the "Azerbaijanfilm" studio, the film is set in Baku during World War II and portrays the life of a teacher navigating the challenges of wartime society.
