= The Cloth Peddler =

The Cloth Peddler or Arşın Mal Alan may refer to several Azerbaijani films and plays.

- The Cloth Peddler (1917 film)
- The Cloth Peddler (1945 film)
