= Şəhər bağında xalq gəzintisi =

- Directed by: Alexandre Michon
- Written by: Alexandre Michon
- Produced by: Alexandre Michon
- Release date: June 21, 1898
- Country: Russian Empire

Şəhər bağında xalq gəzintisi (People's walk in the city park) is one of the earliest films produced in the cinema of Azerbaijan. Directed by cinema pioneer Alexandre Michon, it was filmed on May 31, 1898 and released on June 21, 1898 in Baku.

The film was shot on 35mm.

== See also ==
- List of Azerbaijani films: 1898-1919
