= Bakuvians Walk in the City Park =

Bakı əhalisinin şəhər bağında gəzintisi
- Directed by: Q. Matye
- Written by: Q. Matye
- Produced by: Q. Matye
- Release date: November 19, 1900
- Country: Russian Empire
- Language: Silent

Bakuvians Walk in the City Park (Azerbaijani: Bakı əhalisinin şəhər bağında gəzintisi) is a 1900 Russian-Azerbaijani actuality film directed by Q. Matye. It was filmed on November 12, 1900, the same day Matye shot The Life of Bakuvians and Their Movement Along the Velikokniaz Avenue. The film was shot on 35mm, and was released on November 19, 1900, in Baku.

== See also ==
- List of Azerbaijani films: 1898-1919
