= Qafqaz və Merkuri cəmiyyətinin paroxodunun limandan yola düşməsi =

- Directed by: Aleksandr Mişon
- Written by: Aleksandr Mişon
- Produced by: Aleksandr Mişon
- Release date: 1898
- Running time: 1 minute
- Country: Russian Empire
- Language: Silent

Qafqaz və Merkuri cəmiyyətinin paroxodunun limandan yola düşməsi (Departure of the steamer of the Caucasus and Mercury Society from the port) is one of the earliest films produced in the cinema of Azerbaijan. Directed by Azeri cinema pioneer Alexandre Michon, it was released in the summer of 1898.

The film was shot on 35mm.

== See also ==
- List of Azerbaijani films: 1898-1919
