= Jirtdan's Movie =

Animated Azerbaijani film from 1969

- Cırtdan
- Directed by: Elchin Effendiev; Aghanagi Akhundov
- Screenplay by: Alla Akhundova
- Produced by: Hafiz Akbarov
- Cinematography: Alexander Milov
- Music by: Ogtay Zulfugarov
- Production company: Azerbaijanfilm
- Release date: 1969
- Running time: 10 minutes
- Countries: Azerbaijan SSR, Soviet Union
- Languages: Azerbaijani, Russian

Jirtdan (Azerbaijani: Cırtdan) is a Soviet animated film created by Elchin Effendiev and Aghanagi Akhundov at the Azerbaijanfilm studio in 1969. It is one of the first Azerbaijani animated films, and is the first film shot after the restoration of the studio's animation workshop in 1968. On the 28th of February, 1969, work on Jirtdan was completed and the film was finally released on screens in 1969.

Jirtdan survives as a single 35mm positive archival print held at the Azerbaijan State Film Fund in Baku. On the 2nd of August 2017, Jirtdan opened the "Day of Azerbaijani Cinema" at the Nakhchivan State Film Fund.

In 2022, the restoration of the film was financed by Kino Klassika, after which it was scanned and restored in 4K by Fixafilm in Warsaw. Color grading was supervised by the assistant art director of Jirtdan, Elchin Hami Akhundov.

The restored version of Jirtdan was screened at the opening ceremony of the 5th ANIMAFILM International Animation Festival on the 7th of September 2022.

Jirtdan is also included in Klassiki's permanent collection and was streamed on Klassiki as the Pick of the Week from the 13th to the 27th of October 2022.

== Plot ==
Based on the Azerbaijani fairy tale of the same name, Jirtdan (meaning “tiny” or “dwarf” in Azerbaijani), paints the story of a child, much smaller than other children his age, who finds strength in his intelligence and his cunning nature. Despite his small stature, he is able to defeat the “div” – a large, hairy, child-eating monster – and lead himself and his brothers to safety. The story is reminiscent of the Brothers Grimm fairy tale "Hansel and Gretel" – a brother and sister duo who outsmart a witch with intentions to eat them and manage to find their way back home.

With a runtime of over 10 minutes, the film tells the story of an underdog, and the unexpected heroism of the vulnerable. Having been deeply embedded in Azerbaijani culture for decades, Jirtdan still remains a favorite of children to this day.

== Cast and crew ==
- Directed by Yalchin Efendiyev and Aghanagi Akhundov
- Screenplay by Alla Akhundova
- Art Director: Elchin Aslanov
- Cinematographer: Alexander Milov
- Composer: Ogtay Zulfugarov
- Sound Engineer: Aliakper Gasan-Zade
- Animators: Bahman Aliyev, Lev Zhdanov, Nazim Mammadov
- Assistant Art Director: Elchin Akhundov
- Assistant Camera Operator: Ismayil Ismayilov
- Assistant Editor: Evgeniya Fomina
- Contributing Editor: Edhem Gulubeyov
- Executive Producer: Hafiz Akbarov

== In popular culture ==
Azerbaijan's first animated 3D film, Jirtdan and Tapagoz, was released in 2012 with the support of the Ministry of Culture and Tourism of Azerbaijan.

Jirtdan's Halloween is a best-seller book published by Darya Hodaei in October 2021 and the story is a twist on Jirtdan's tale.
