= Farewell Ceremony for His Majesty Emir of Bukhara on "Velikiy Kniaz Alexei" Steamboat =

Əlahəzrət Buxara Əmirinin "Veliki Knyaz Aleksey" Paroxodunda Yolasalma Mərasimi
- Directed by: Aleksandr Mişon
- Written by: Aleksandr Mişon
- Produced by: Aleksandr Mişon
- Release date: 1898
- Running time: 1 minute
- Country: Russian Empire

Farewell Ceremony for His Majesty Emir of Bukhara on Velikiy Kniaz (Note: The term is a slavic title for Grand Prince) Alexei Steamboat (Azerbaijani: Əlahəzrət Buxara Əmirinin Veliki Knyaz Aleksey Paroxodunda Yolasalma Mərasimi) (1898) is one of the earliest films ever produced in the Cinema of Azerbaijan directed by Azeri cinema pioneer Aleksandr Mişon. It was released in 1898.

The film was shot on 35mm.

== See also ==
- List of Azerbaijani films: 1898-1919
