= Yeva Olenskaya =

Azerbaijani Soviet actress

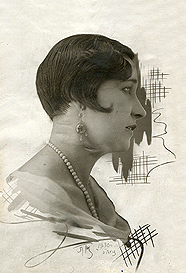
- Born: Yevgenia Nikitichna Olenskaya; 1900; Quba, Baku Province, Russian Empire
- Died: 1959 (aged 58–59); Baku, Azerbaijan SSR, Soviet Union
- Occupation: actress
- Notable work: The Cloth Peddler (1917 film)

Yeva (Yevgenia) Nikitichna Olenskaya (1900, Quba, Baku Province, Russian Empire – 20 May 1959, Baku, Azerbaijan SSR, Soviet Union) was an Azerbaijani Soviet actress, Hero of Labor (1927), People's Artiste of the Azerbaijan SSR (1949). She is best known for her role in the silent film “Arshin mal alan” (The Cloth Peddler) (1917).

== Life ==
Yeva Olenskaya was born in 1900 in Quba, Baku Governorate, Russian Empire. She was of Russian nationality but learned Azerbaijani language as a child. Her elder sister Alexandra Olenskaya was an actress in various Azerbaijani theater troupes and encouraged her sister to try herself on stage too. Later the sister's husband, Heydar Vezirov, People's Commissar of Agriculture of the Azerbaijan SSR, was repressed as a people's enemy along with his wife and two sons.

== Career ==
Olenskaya appeared on the stage for the first time in 1913 at the age of 13 at the premiere of the operetta “Arshin mal alan” in the role of Asya. The same year, in 1913, Olenskaya joined the Azerbaijani dramatic troupe “Nikat”, and then the troupe “Safa”.

In 1917 together with her sister Olenskaya played in the silent film “Arshin mal alan” directed by Boris Svetlov. In 1918-1920 Olenskaya performed in the drama troupe of Hajibekov brothers.

Olenskaya studied at the Baku Theatrical Technical School (now the Azerbaijan State University of Culture and Arts) in 1923–1926.

From late 1920 to early 1925, she worked at the Baku Turkish Free Criticism and Propaganda Theater. Then, in 1926 Olenskaya returned to the National Drama Theater where she performed for thirty four years. Olenskaya created dramatic, tragic and comic roles both in the national drama and in the translated performances.

In 1927, Olenskaya was awarded a title of “Hero of Labor”. In 1949, she was awarded the title of People's Artist of the Republic.

Yeva Olenskaya died on 20 May 1959 in Baku.

== Theater works ==
- Maria Antonovna (The Government Inspector by N. Gogol);
- Arkhipovna (Guilty Without Fault by A. Ostrovsky);
- Dunka (Lyubov Yarovaya by K. Trenyov);
- Oksana (The Death of the Squadron by O. Korneichuk);
- Manya (Strangers Child by V. Shkvarkin);
- Grandmother Vera (The Young Guard by A. Fadeyev);
- Erna Curcius (Manor in the alley by P.Tour);
- Leokadia Lvovna (Daughter of the Prosecutor by Y. Yanovsky);
- Dergacheva (Personal case by A. Stein).
