= The Life of Bakuvians and Their Movement Along the Velikokniaz Avenue =

Bakı camaatının həyatı və Velikoknyaz prospekti ilə hərəkəti
- Directed by: Q. Matye
- Written by: Q. Matye
- Produced by: Q. Matye
- Release date: November 19, 1900
- Country: Russian Empire

The Life of Bakuvians and Their Movement Along the Velikokniaz Avenue (Azerbaijani: Bakı camaatının həyatı və Velikoknyaz prospekti ilə hərəkəti) is a 1900 Russian film directed by Q. Matye. It was filmed on November 12, 1900 the very day Matye shot Bakuvians Walk in the City Park. The film was released on November 19, 1900 in Baku. The film was shot on 35mm.

== See also ==
- List of Azerbaijani films: 1898-1919
- Azerbaijani film
