= Balaxanı-Sabunçu polis idarəsi süvari qorodovoyların at oynatmaları =

1898 Azerbaijani short documentary film

Balaxanı-Sabunçu Polis İdarəsi Süvari Qorodovoylarının At Oynatmaları
- Azerbaijani: Balaxanı-Sabunçu Polis İdarəsi Süvari Qorodovoylarının At Oynatmaları
- Directed by: Alexandre Michon
- Written by: Alexandre Michon
- Produced by: Alexandre Michon
- Cinematography: Alexandre Michon
- Release date: 4 August 1898
- Running time: 1 minute
- Country: Russian Empire
- Language: Silent

Balaxanı-Sabunçu Polis İdarəsi Süvari Qorodovoylarının At Oynatmaları (English: Horse exercises by the mounted gorodovoy of the Balakhani–Sabunchu Police Department) is an 1898 short actuality film directed, produced and photographed by Azerbaijani cinema pioneer Alexandre Michon. It records mounted policemen performing riding exercises in the Balakhani–Sabunchu district near Baku, then part of the Russian Empire. The film is among the earliest motion pictures made in present-day Azerbaijan.

== Background and exhibition ==
Michon began filming actuality scenes in Baku in 1898 using a Lumière cinematograph. Contemporary and retrospective accounts indicate that short films titled The Horse Guards of the Balakhani–Sabunchu Police Department Riding and Oil Gusher in Balakhani were shown in Baku during early August 1898. The film is listed in Azerbaijani film catalogues as a one-minute silent documentary shot in and around Baku.

== See also ==
- Cinema of Azerbaijan
- List of Azerbaijani films before 1920
- Alexandre Michon
