= Talat Bakikhanov =

Azerbaijani musician (1927–2000)

Tələt Bakıxanov
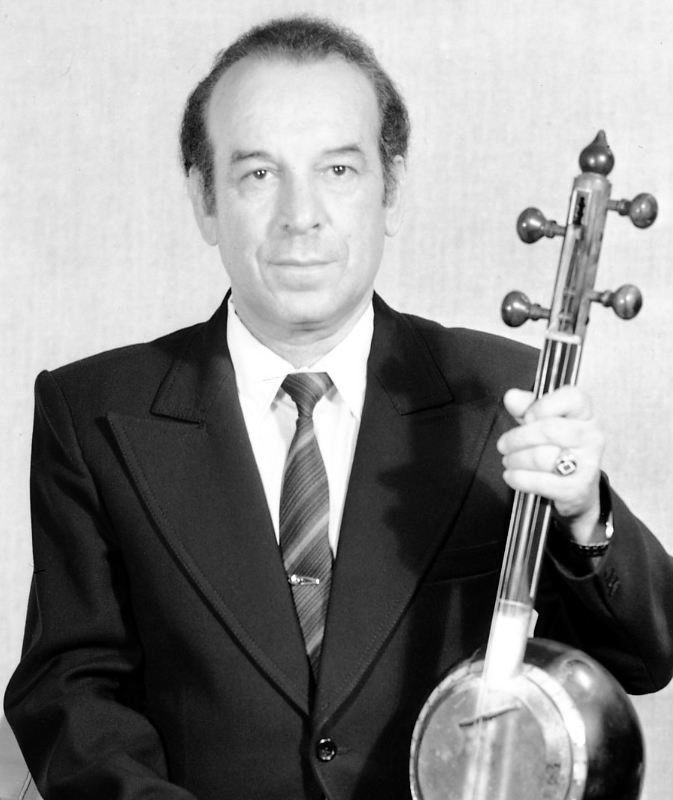
- Born: June 13, 1927; Baku, Azerbaijan Soviet Socialist Republic
- Died: May 30, 2000 (aged 72); Baku, Azerbaijan
- Occupations: Musician; Actor

Talat Soltan oglu Bakikhanov (Azerbaijani: Tələt Soltan oğlu luBakıxanov; June 13, 1927 – May 30, 2000) was an Azerbaijani musician who played the kamancheh, a mugham performer.

== Life ==
Talat Bakikhanov was born on June 13, 1927, in Baku. A huge role in his upbringing as a musician was played by his uncle Akhmed Bakikhanov. Talat studied with Hafiz Mirzaliyev and Firuz Alizadeh at the Azerbaijan National Conservatory Music College named after Asaf Zeynally in 1947–1949. Since 1947 he was a soloist of the Azerbaijan State Academic Philharmonic Hall named after Muslim Magomayev.

Talat Bakikhanov died on May 30, 2000, in Baku.

== Musical career ==
Talat Bakikhanov performed not only within Azerbaijan, but also in France, Indonesia, Malta, Iran, Iraq, Turkey, Syria. He also accompanied famous Azerbaijani khananda Mugam performers. So in the film "If Not That One, Then This One", based on the musical comedy of the same name by the Azerbaijani composer Uzeyir Hajibeyov, Talat Bakikhanov accompanies Khan Shushinski. Talat was also known as the performer of the Segah mugam in the Kamancheh.

He was a participant and winner of many symposia, both republican and international competitions. Talat Bakikhanov participated in the first and second international symposia held in Samarkand in the 1970s and 1980s, where he presented Azerbaijani Mugham with such masters as Bahram Mansurov, Alim Gasimov.

== Awards ==
- Honored Artist of the Azerbaijan SSR (1975)
- Medal "Veteran of Labour" (1980)

== Family ==
Talat Bakikhanov was from the Bakikhanov family, one of the most famous noble families in Azerbaijan.

== See also ==
- Uzeyir Hajibeyov
