= Maryam Seyidbeyli =

- Born: October 3, 1955; Baku, Azerbaijan
- Occupation: historian

Maryam Gasan gizi Seyidbeyli (Azerbaijani: Məryəm Həsən qızı Seyidbəyli; born October 3, 1955, in Azerbaijan Republic) is an Azerbaijani historian, Doctor of Historical Sciences, director of the Institute of the History of Science of Azerbaijan National Academy of Sciences (ANAS).

== Biography ==
Maryam Seyidbeyli was born into a family of intellectuals on October 3, 1955, in Baku, Azerbaijan. She studied at the Department of Arabic Language and Literature, Faculty of Oriental Studies of Baku State University. In 1981 she began her career as a junior scientific worker at the Department of " The ancient history of Azerbaijan" of the Institute of History named after Abbasgulu Agha Bakikhanov of Azerbaijan National Academy of Sciences.

In 1983 she continued her career at the Department of "The Medieval History of Azerbaijan (III-XII centuries)". In the same year she successfully completed two years of French course.

In 1980–1986 she went on business trip to Algeria, Syria, Libya as an Arabic interpreter. In 1996 she defended her candidate of degree dissertation on "Scientific and Cultural life of Azerbaijan in the first half of the 13th century-early 14th century" (on the basis of materials of Ibn al-Fuvati's " Talxis maema al-adab fi mucam al-alkab"). In the same year the monograph related to this subject was recognized "the best book of the year".

In 2013 she was appointed the head of Department of "Azerbaijani Diaspora". In 2009 the monograph named "Azerbaijani Diaspora in Russia: Specifics and Trends of Formation and Development (1988–2007)". This book was awarded with the Diploma in the International Contest relating to "The best scientific book" of "Nauchnaya Kniqa" in November 2010. In 2010 the second updated version of monograph named "Azerbaijani Diaspora in Russia: Specifics and Trends of Formation and Development (1988–2010) was published. The monograph was honored with the Humay Award on April 27, 2011.

In 2012 the book named "The encyclopedic reference book of Azerbaijani Diaspora" was printed and this book was awarded with the Diploma for researches on history of the Azerbaijani Diaspora. She was the author of more than 50 scientific articles of Medieval and Modern History of Azerbaijan. She participated in international conferences. On February 15, 2013, she defended the doctor degree dissertation "Formation and development of Azerbaijani Diaspora in Russian Federation".

She was the chairman of International Relations Commission of Baku Multiculturalism Centre.

The Institute of the History of Science was established on the decree of the Presidium of ANAS on February 27, 2014, and Meryem Seyidbeyli, the Doctor of Historical Sciences, was appointed the director of the Institute of the Science of History of ANAS.

She is the daughter of the screenwriter, Hasan Seyidbeyli.
