= Hasan Seyidbeyli =

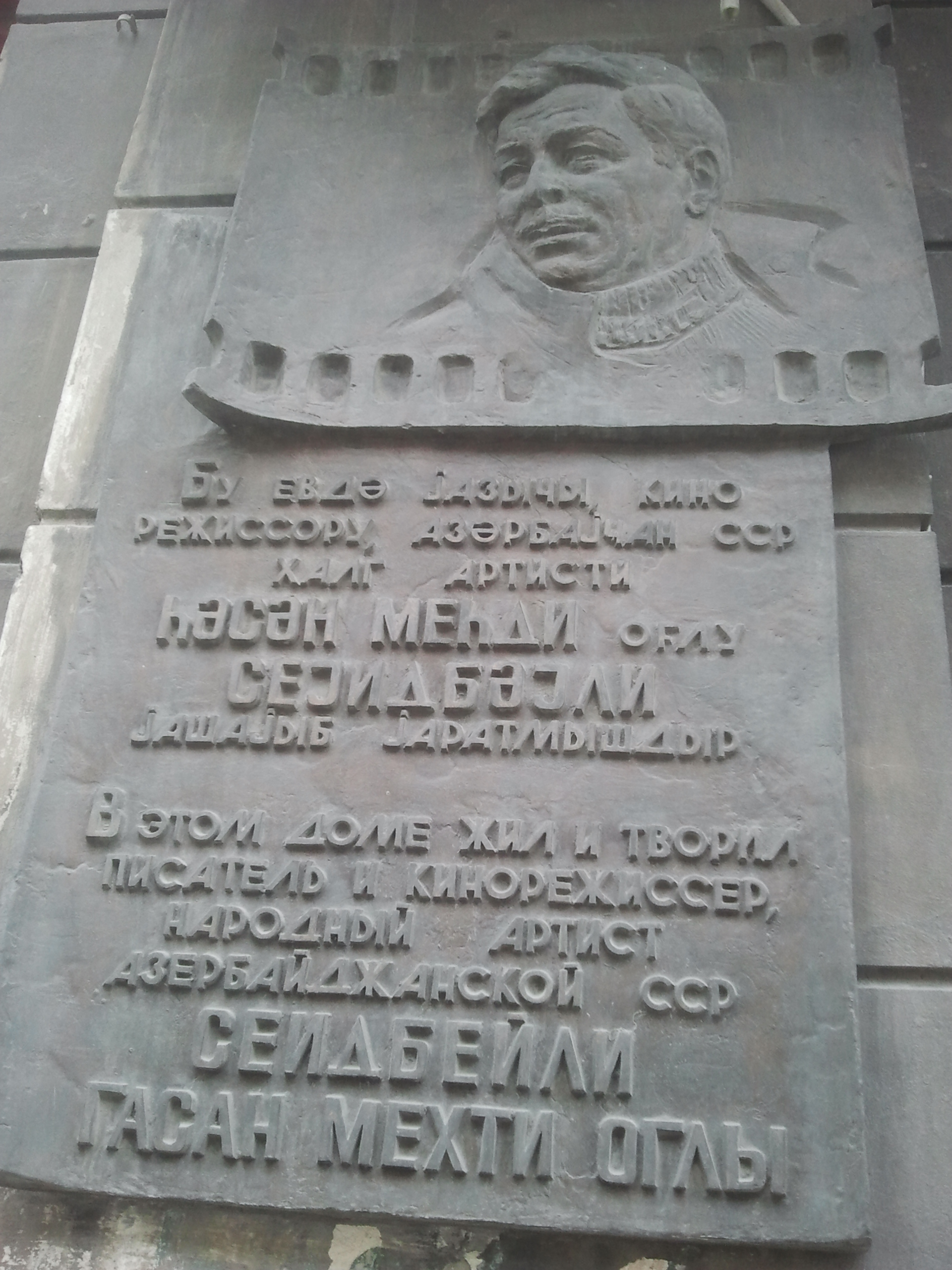
- Plaque on building where Azerbaijani film director and writer Hasan Seyidbeyli lived in Baku
- Born: 22 December 1920; Baku, Azerbaijan SSR
- Died: 25 June 1980 (aged 59); Baku, Azerbaijan SSR, Soviet Union
- Citizenship: Soviet
- Occupations: Film director, screenwriter
- Children: Maryam Seyidbeyli
- Writing career
- Years active: 1954–1980

Hasan Seyidbeyli (Azerbaijani: Həsən Mehdi oğlu Seyidbəyli) was an Azerbaijani film director, screenwriter, writer and dramatist.

== Biography ==
Hasan Seyidbeyli was born on December 22, 1920, in Baku. He graduated from the 132nd City Secondary School here. Hasan Mehdi oglu Seyidbeyli studied at the Leningrad Institute of Cinematography Engineers in 1938–1939 and at the All-Union State Institute of Cinematography in Moscow from 1943 to 1951, specializing in film direction. In 1942, his literary activity began. In 1943, he continued his education at the director faculty of the Gerasimov Institute of Cinematography (with Sergei Eisenstein and Grigori Kozintsev). Member of the Communist Party since 1955.

Hasan Seyidbeyli served as the First Secretary of the Board of the Azerbaijan Cinematographers Union from 1963 to 1980. His dramatic works, "Exam," "Gold Seekers," and "Closed Doors," were staged both in Azerbaijan and abroad. His novellas "On the Banks of the Caspian" (1953), "Our Astrada" (1956), "The Telephone Girl" (1960), and his novels "From Front to Front" (1961), "Years Pass" (1973, co-authored with I. Qasımov), "Shipyard" (1975), "Flower" (1978), and plays "Brave Souls Love the Sea" (1954) and "Why Do You Live?" (1959, both co-authored with I. Qasımov) explore the labor and moral purity of his contemporaries. His novel "On Distant Shores" (1954, co-authored with I. Qasımov) was dedicated to the Soviet Hero M. Hüseynzadeh. His works have been translated into several foreign languages.His films have been awarded prizes and diplomas at All-Union Film Festivals.

A personal archive of director Hasan Seyidbeyli has been created at the Film Fund.

He died in Baku at the age of 59.

== Filmography ==
- From Baku to Göygöl (film, 1947, Azerbaijani: Bakıdan Göy-gölədək) – Director
- The Great Road (film, 1949, Azerbaijani: Böyük yol) – Director
- In the Gardens of Quba and the Tartar River Valley (film, 1949, Azerbaijani: Quba bağlarında və Tərtərçay vadisində) – Director, Screenplay Writer
- To My Native People (film, 1954, Azerbaijani: Doğma xalqıma) – Screenplay Writer
- Under the Scorching Sun (film, 1957, Azerbaijani: Qızmar günəş altında) – Screenplay Writer
- On Distant Shores (film, 1958, Azerbaijani: Uzaq sahillərdə) – Screenplay Writer
- Incident on the Highway (film, 1960, Azerbaijani: Şosedə hadisə) – Screenplay Writer
- Profit from the Crooked Path (film, 1960, Azerbaijani: Əyri yolla qazanc) – Screenplay Writer
- The Telephone Girl (film, 1962, Azerbaijani: Telefonçu qız) – Director, Screenplay Writer
- Island of Miracles (film, 1963, Azerbaijani: Möcüzələr adası) – Director, Screenplay Writer
- Gravitational Force (film, 1964, Azerbaijani: Cazibə qüvvəsi ) (Film, Kinoalmanac)– Director, Screenplay Writer, "Chairman" role
- The Elevator Girl (film, 1966) (Film, Kinoalmanac, Azerbaijani: Liftçi qız) – Screenplay Writer
- Why Are You Silent? (film, 1966, Azerbaijani: Sən niyə susursan?) – Director, Screenplay Writer
- Our Teacher Cəbiş (film, 1969, Azerbaijani: Bizim Cəbiş müəllim) – Director
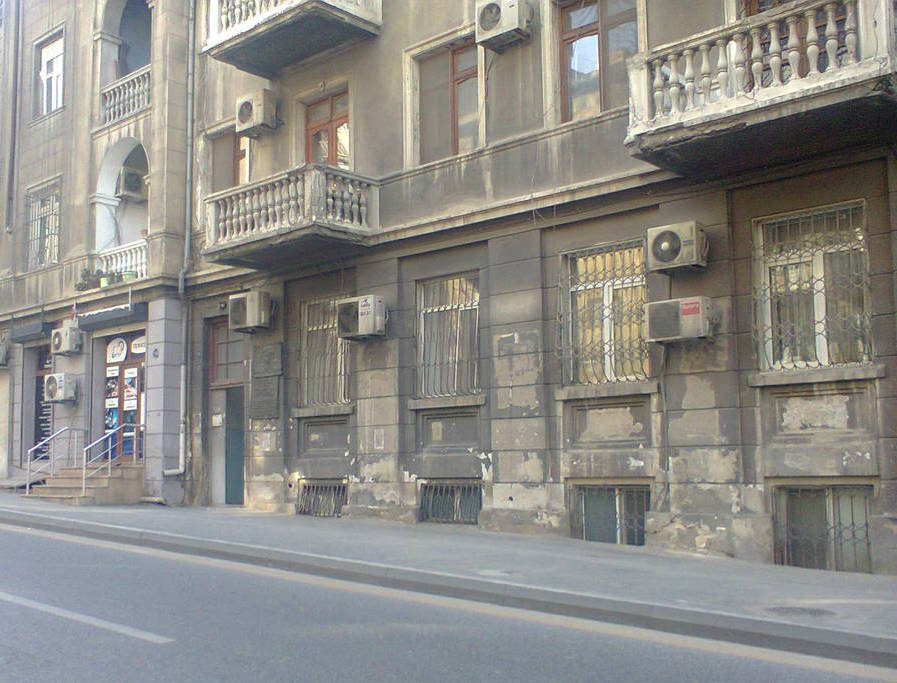
- Hasan Seyidbeyli's house
  Find That Girl (film, 1970, Azerbaijani: O qızı tapın) – Director, Screenplay Writer
- Soviet Azerbaijan (film, 1972, Azerbaijani: Sovet Azərbaycanı) – Screenplay Writer
- Nəsimi (film, 1973, Azerbaijani: Nəsimi) – Director; The film includes thoughts about Imamaddin Nəsimi.
- Pages of Life (film, 1974, Azerbaijani: Ömrün səhifələri) – Director, Screenplay Writer, Artistic Director
- Concerns of Happiness (film, 1976, Azerbaijani: Xoşbəxtlik qayğıları) – Director, Screenplay Writer
- Our Umbrella is Clouds (film, 1976, Azerbaijani: Çətirimiz buludlardır) – Artistic Director
- Maturity (film, 1979, Azerbaijani: Kamillik) – Screenplay Writer
- Toral and Zəri (film, 1979, Azerbaijani: Toral və Zəri) – Screenplay Writer
- His Troubled Love (film, 1980, Azerbaijani: Onun bəlalı sevgisi) – Artistic Director
- Goodbye, My Friend (film, 1980, Azerbaijani: Sağ ol, dostum) – Screenplay Writer
- Film Director Hasan Seyidbeyli (film, 2002, Azerbaijani: Kinorejissor Həsən Seyidbəyli) – The film is dedicated to Həsən Seyidbəyli.
- The Man Who Loved Cinema. Hasan Seyidbeyli (film, 2015, Azerbaijani: Kinonu sevən adam. Həsən Seyidbəyli) – The film is dedicated to Hasan Seyidbeyli.

== Awards and honors ==
- Order of the Badge of Honour (1959)
- Honored Art Worker of the Azerbaijan SSR (1960)
- Order of the Red Banner of Labour (1970)
- People's Artiste of the Azerbaijan SSR (1976)
