= Mirmahmud Kazimovski =

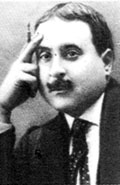
- Born: 1882.02.27; Baku Bilgah
- Died: 1940.12.01; Baku
- Citizenship: Soviet Union
- Known for: actor film director playwright educator director

Mirmahmud Miralakber oglu Kazimovski (February 27, 1882, Bilgah, Baku – December 1, 1940, Baku) — Azerbaijani actor, teacher, playwright, author of Vaudevilles and musical comedies, director, one of the first members and organizer of the Baku Muslim Theater established in 1906, Honored Artist of the Azerbaijan SSR (1938).

== Biography ==
Mirmahmud Kazimovski was born in 1882 in the village of Bilgah, Baku. Mirmahmud spent his early years of education with Huseyn Arablinski, with whom he later became close friends. While still at school, they participated in drama clubs and performed in a number of episodic roles.

Later, Mirmahmud Kazimovski began to be recognized as a professional artist. He successfully performed the roles of Filippovich in Nikolai Gogol's "The Inspector", Jahangir bey in Najaf bey Vazirov's "Pahlavani Zamana", an officer and a peasant in Shamsaddin Sami's "Gava", Ahmed in "Musibati-Fakhraddin", as well as in the works of a number of Western European playwrights. Among these works, William Shakespeare's tragedy "Othello" occupied a special place.

One of Mirmahmud Kazimovski's greatest achievements was his excellent performance of female roles at a time when women had not yet entered the theater stage in Azerbaijan.

Hasan bey Zardabi had a great influence on Mirmahmud Kazimovski's pedagogical activity.

Mirmahmud Kazimovski tried to attract young people's interest in Azerbaijani literature. He always told his students: "Literature is a mirror of the people. If you want to get acquainted with the historical and cultural life of a people, its desires and aspirations, joys and sorrows, turn to its literature." He often organized literary evenings in schools, and with great enthusiasm read the ghazals of Nizami Ganjavi, Imadaddin Nasimi, and Mahammad Fuzuli for students.

Mirmahmud Kazimovski directed many plays. In 1912, the vaudeville "Molla Jabi" was published in Baku.

He died on December 1, 1940, at the age of 58.

== Works ==
- What does not bleed, what does not make bleed. Baku: 1911;
- Dashim-dashim. Baku: 1911;
- Molla Jabi (operetta in 4 acts). Baku: Mirbabayev's "Zarya" printing house, 1912;
- Vurhavur (operetta in 3 acts). Baku: 1915

== Family ==
Mirmahmud Kazimovski is the father of director Rauf Kazimovski and the grandfather of director Alakbar Kazimovski.

== Memory ==
- One of the central streets in Baku is named after Mirmahmud Kazimovski.
- A memorial plaque has been installed on the wall of the house where MirMahmud Kazimovski lived in Baku.

== Filmography ==
1. In the Kingdom of Oil and Millions
2. In the Name of God
3. Baku people (film, 1938)
4. Peasants (film, 1939)
5. Present (film, 1942)
