= Train Entering the Railroad Station =

Qatarın dəmiryol stansiyasına daxil olması
- Directed by: Aleksandr Mişon
- Written by: Aleksandr Mişon
- Produced by: Aleksandr Mişon
- Release date: 1898
- Country: Russian Empire

Train Entering the Railroad Station (Azerbaijani: Qatarın dəmiryol stansiyasına daxil olması) is one of the earliest Russian films produced in the cinema of Azerbaijan. It was directed by Azeri cinema pioneer Aleksandr Mişon and released in the summer of 1898.

The film was shot on 35mm.

== See also ==
- Azerbaijani films (1898–1919)
