= The Folk Dance of Caucasus =

Qafqaz Rəqsi
- Directed by: Aleksandr Mişon
- Written by: Aleksandr Mişon
- Produced by: Aleksandr Mişon
- Release date: August 2, 1898
- Running time: 1 minute
- Country: Russian Empire
- Language: Silent

The Folk Dance of Caucasus (Azerbaijani: Qafqaz Rəqsi) is one of the earliest Russian films. Produced and directed by the pioneer of Azerbaijani cinema, Alexander Mishon, it was released on August 2, 1898.

The film was shot on 35mm.

== See also ==
- List of Azerbaijani films: 1898-1919
