= Types of Bakuvian Bazaars =

1907 film by Vasil Amashukeli

Bakı Bazarların Tiplari
- Directed by: Vasili Amaşukeli
- Written by: Vasili Amaşukeli
- Produced by: Vasili Amaşukeli
- Distributed by: Ağ-Qara Filmlər, Qısametrajlı Sənədli Filmlər
- Release date: 1907
- Country: Russian Empire

Types of Bakuvian Bazaars (Azerbaijani: Bakı Bazarlarının Tipləri) is a 1907 Russian short documentary film directed by Vasili Amaşukeli.

The film shot on 35mm captures the market scene in Baku, Russian Empire in the early twentieth century.

It was produced by the Qısametralı Sənədli Filmlər and Ağ-Qara Filmlər film companies.

== See also ==
- List of Azerbaijani films: 1898-1919
