= If Not That One, Then This One =

1910 operetta by Uzeyir Hajibeyov

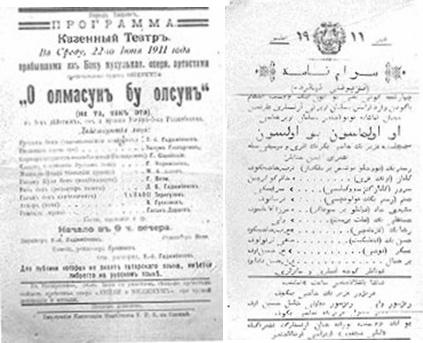
Program of performance in Baku, 1911

If Not That One, Then This One (Azerbaijani: O olmasın, bu olsun; او اولماسون بو اولسون), also known as Mashadi Ibad (Azerbaijani: Məşədi İbad; مشهدی عباد) is a 1910 Azerbaijani operetta in four acts written by composer Uzeyir Hajibeyov. The comedy reflects social and everyday life relations in prerevolution Azerbaijan. It is the composer's second work written in this genre, and is considered a national classic alongside the same composer's Arshin mal alan.

== History ==
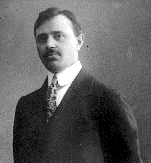
Uzeyir Hajibeyov (1913)

Hajibeyov's second musical comedy was written in 1910, initially it was in three acts. After 1915, when an additional scene was written, it was recast in four acts. Hajibeyov used the Azerbaijani mugam musical style in some of the music and incorporated extracts from Fuzûlî's ghazals in the libretto. The operetta was reviewed in the Kaspi newspaper of April 7, 1911, which noted that its music included both traditional and newly-written melodies. The premiere of If not that one was held in Baku, on April 25, 1911 at the Mailov brothers' theatre (today the Azerbaijan State Academic Opera and Ballet Theater). Mirzaagha Aliyev played Mashadi Ibad, with Huseyngulu Sarabski appearing as Sarvar, Ahmed Agdamski as Gulnaz, Rustam bey's daughter, (as women did not appear on the stage at that time in Baku), and M. H.Teregulov as Hasan bey. The musical was conducted by the composer. The libretto of the comedy was first published in Baku in 1912 by the Orujov brothers' printing house.

The comedy was staged by Azad Amirov, who also acted the leading part (Mashadi Ibad) in Shusha, in 1912. In his memories Hajibeyov noted Amirov's beautiful performance of this role.

Many actors and singers took part on staging of the musical in following years, including Alihuseyn Gafarli (Mashadi Ibad), Lutfali Abdullayev (Hambal), Nasiba Zeynalova (Senem), Lutfiyar Imanov (Sarvar, Rza bey), and Hajibaba Baghirov (Mashadi Ibad). It was translated into many languages and was successfully staged in cities of South Caucasus, Turkey, Yemen and Tabriz and others. For example, in Bulgaria the comedy was staged in 1966, during the festival of Turkic nations of the country.

If not that one was staged by actors of the Azerbaijan State Theatre of Musical Comedy under the guidance of Jannat Salimova, during the 27th International Fajr Festival, which was held in Tehran in 2009.

The operetta has also been filmed twice.

Early performers of leading roles

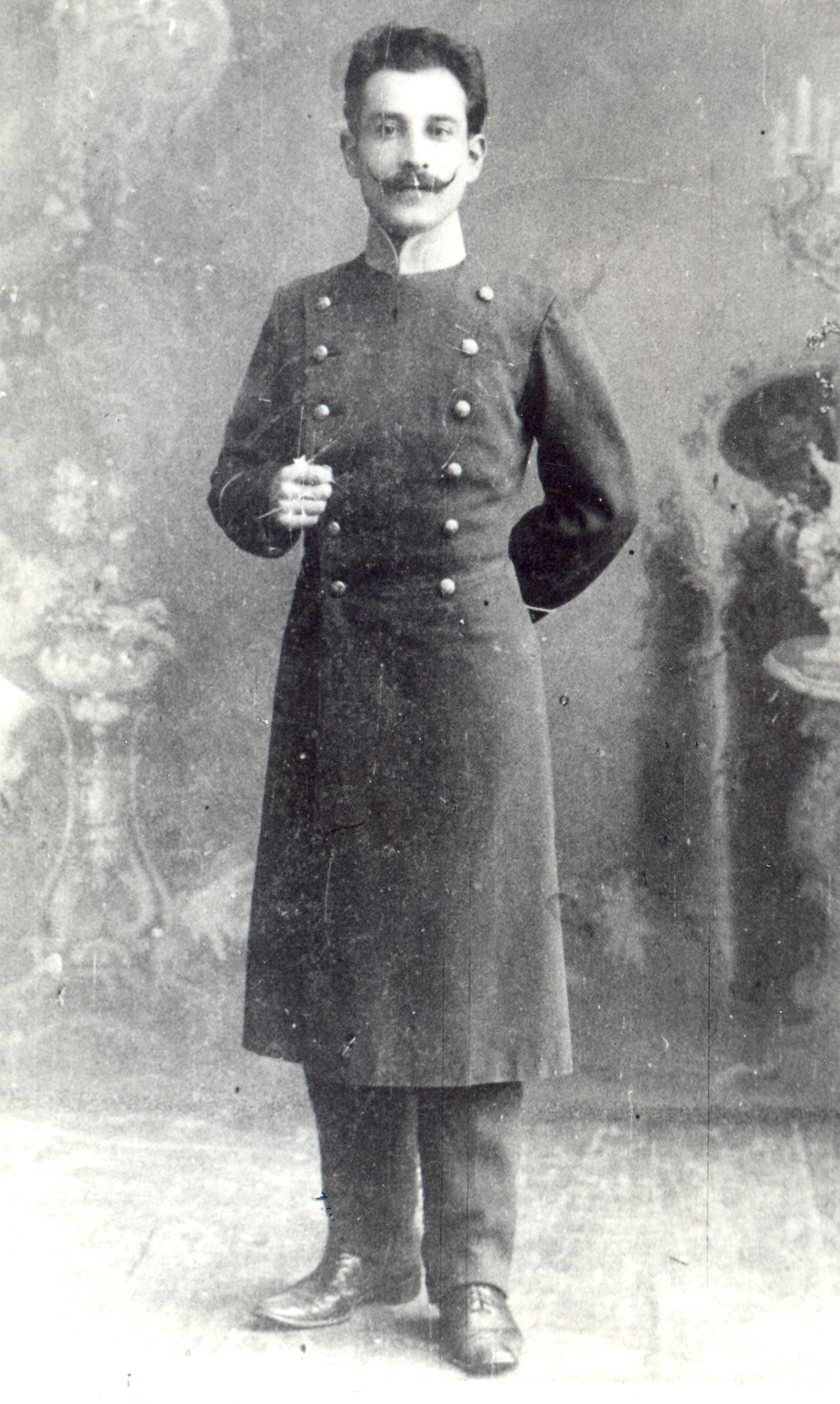
Azad Amirov (Mashadi Ibad)

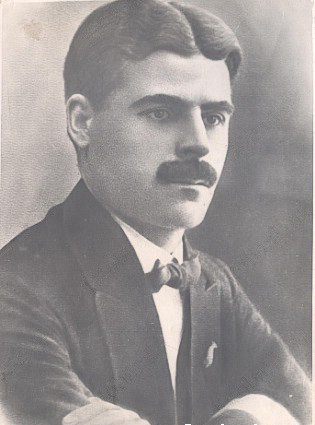
Huseyngulu Sarabski (Sarvar)

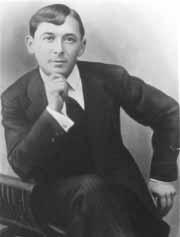
Ahmed Agdamski (Gulnaz)

== Characters ==
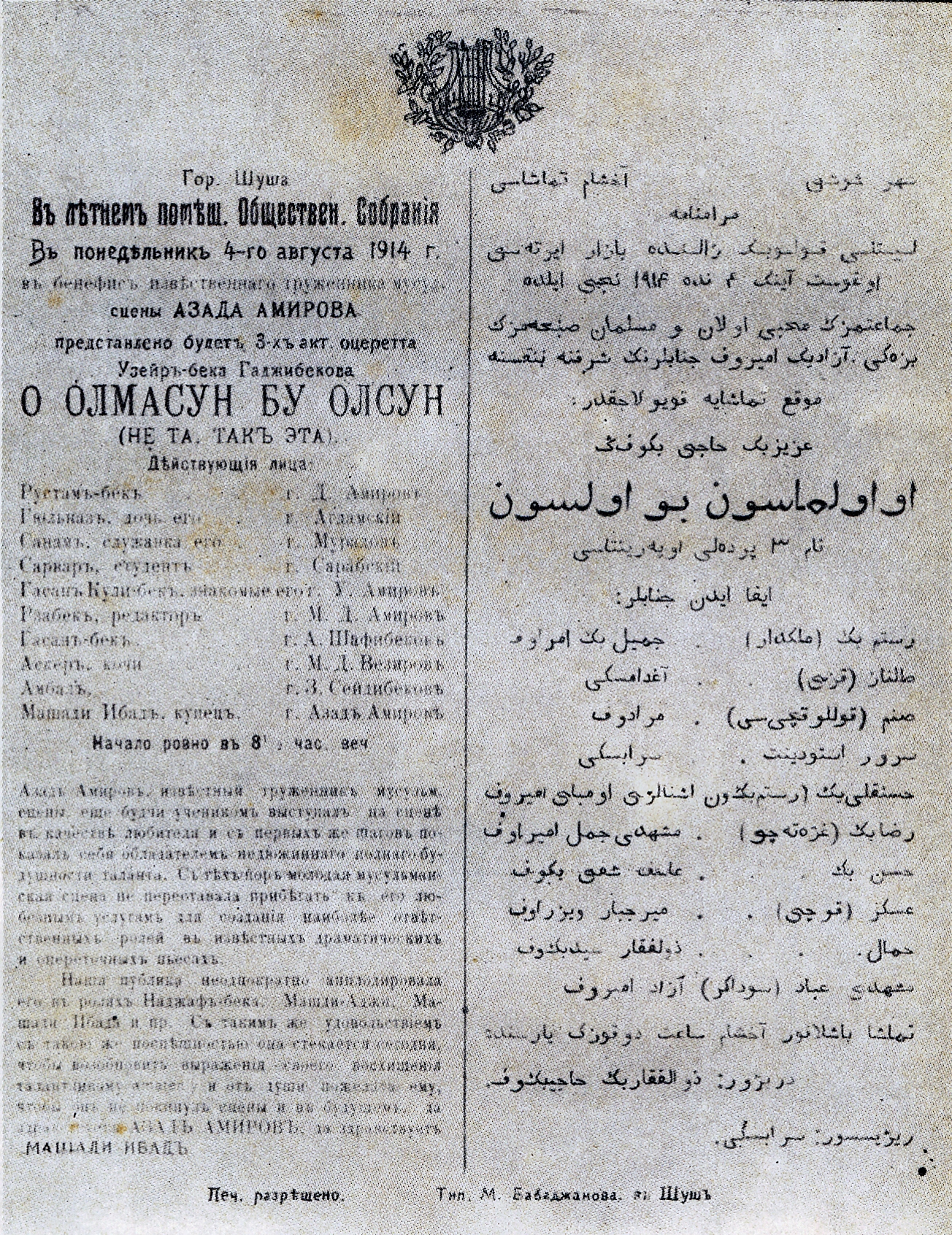
Programme for the performance at the Summer Building of the Public Assembly, Shusha, 1914

- Rustam bey – an impoverished bey, 45 years old
- Gulnaz – Rustam bey's daughter, 15 years old, in love with Sarvar
- Sarvar – a student, 25 years old, in love with Gulnaz
- Senem – Rustam bey's servant, widow, 30 years old
- Mashadi Ibad – a rich merchant, 50 years old, would like to marry Gulnaz
- Hasangulu bey – a nationalist, 40 years old
- Rustam bey's friends
  - Rza bey – 40 years old, journalist
  - Hasan bey – an intellectual, 40 years old
  - Gochu Asger – an ataman, 30 years old
- Hambal – a servant
- Mashadi Gazanfar – a bathhouse attendant
- Usta Maharram – a barber
- Kerbalayi Nasir – a tradesman
- Bathhouse servant
- Group of bandits
- Tradesmen. townsfolk,. etc.

== Synopsis ==
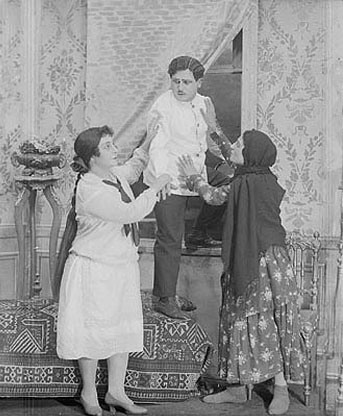
Senem and Gulnaz hide Sarvar. Azerbaijan State Theatre of Musical Comedy, 1928. Director: Abbas Mirza Sharifzadeh

=== Act 1 ===
The act begins with townsfolk singing "What a nonsense people talk". Enter Sarvar and Gulnaz. The "Seygah" mugham is performed on the tar. Sarvar reads Fuzûlî's gazals to Gulnaz, who informs him that her father Rustam bey is going to marry her to the old merchant Mashadi Ibad. Rustam bey has told her the "happy" news and she is forced to obey.

Meshadi Ibad, arrives singing a song "In spite of my old age". In a duet with Rustam bey he agrees to pay him for arranging the marriage. Enter Gulnaz and Senem; a witty conversation between them and Mashadi Ibad ensues. (Ensemble: "If I were in a beautiful garden"). After the girls have left, Rustam bey asks Mashadi Ibad to stay; guests arribe - Hasangulu bey, Rza bey, Hasan bey and others. The guests sing "It's said that a wedding is due to take place!", greeting Mashadi Ibad. Whilst proposing toasts Gochu Asger and Hasan bey are joking and mocking Mashadi Ibad, and Hasan bey calls him a monkey. Mashadi Ibad becomes angry and they begin to fight. (Ensemble: "Hey, you! Be ashamed of your behavior").

=== Act 2 ===
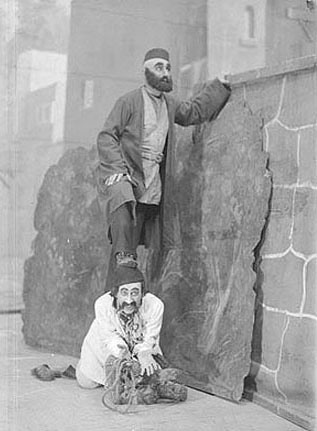
Mashadi Ibad climbs on Hambal to climb over the wall. Azerbaijan State Opera and Ballet Theatre, 1928

Gulnaz and Sarvar sit on Rustam bey's terrace. A tar player performs the mugham melody "Shahnaz". Gulnaz and Sarvar sing "Spring has come and the luxuriant rose has blossomed". Mashadi Ibad enters, with a bundle of apples and pears; he approaches the fence and wants to climb over it to see Gulnaz, so he summons Hambal, and climbs on his back. He sees Gulnar together with Sarvar; Sarvar says that he has come for Gulnaz and that he is her fiancé. Mashadi Ibad becomes angry and sadly sings the mugham "Rast". He decides to summon support from Gochu Asger's gang and leaves. Sarvar and Gulnaz sing "Thank God! We haven't become victims". Asger appears with his gang and Mashadi Ibad. Asger demands 100 rubles from Meshadi Ibad to kill Sarvar. He, his gang, Gulnaz and Sarvar sing the ensemble "Hey, who is there? Open the door!". The gang take their pistols, but Sarvar summons the police; the gang are frightened and run away. Rustam bey, returning home, stumbles on Sarvar as he is leaving the house and learns that his daughter has fallen in love with Sarvar. Sarvar persuades Rustem bey not to marry his daughter to Mashadi Ibad. Meanwhile, Hasangulu bey enquires about "the second fiancé of the fiancée" and taking 500 rubles from Mashadi Ibad promises to solve the problem. Rza bey also learns about it and takes 500 rubles from Meshadi Ibad, saying that he will disgrace Rustam bey in his newspaper. They all visit Rustam bey's house and call on him to explain why he is marrying his daughter to a third party, whilst promising her to Mashadi Ibad. (Ensemble: "You may not!"). Mashadi Ibad reports to Rustam bey that he has seen Gulnaz with a young man. Rustam bey answers that he is a dear uncle of the girl who was only teasing him. Everybody laughs, apologizing to Rustam bey. Mashadi Ibad asks to hold the wedding quickly. Exeunt all to the bath house for the washing ceremony prior to the wedding.

=== Act 3 ===
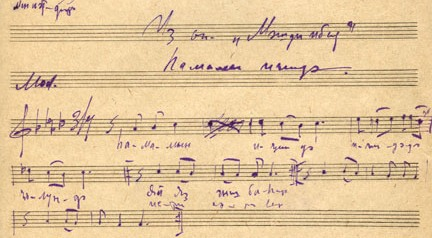
Composer's manuscript of the bathhouse assistant's song "Both inside the bath house and outside of it".

The bath house. The attendant Mashadi Gazanfar praises the bath house, followed by the ensemble "Both inside the bath house and outside of it". There follows the solemn ceremony of leaving the bathhouse. Everybody has washed and dressed. Hasan bey begins to dispute with Hasangulu bey on a trifle, in order not to pay. Rza bey also joins the dispute and compares the bathhouse's water to gravy. When Mashadi Ibad starts discussing payment, the beys wink at each other and leave the bathhouse. Mashadi Ibad and Hambal have to pay for everybody. Mashadi Gazanfar complains about his quarrelling customers and again praises his bath house.

=== Act 4 ===
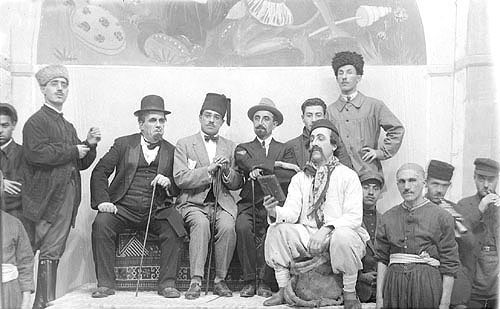
Mashadi Ibad's' wedding. Azerbaijan State Opera and Ballet Theatre, 1928.

Mashadi Ibad's house. The wedding ceremony, led by Gochu Asger, is being held in a large hall. Hasangulu bey and Rza bey are among the guests. The musicians play the lezginka. Mashadi Ibad dances with Mirzeyi. Then he soliloquizes that Gulnaz should be held under lock and key, and if she is obstinate, he will beat her. The fiancée, her head covered with a shawl, is brought to the room. Mashadi Ibad enters and sings "In spite of my old age, I am not inferior to thousand youngsters". When he attempts to remove the shawl from his fiancée's head, he finds to his surprise Sarvar, who holds his cigarette case to Mashadi Ibad's head, pretending it is a pistol. He makes Mashadi Ibad write that he refuses to marry to Gulnaz, and instead wishes to marry Senem. Mashadi Ibad calls for help and tells guests what has happened. Hasangulu bey, Rza bey and Asger again ask Mashadi Ibad to give them money, but he refuses and asks to approve his marriage with Senem. Everybody says that "he acts correctly: if not this one, then that one". Senem, Mashadi Ibad sing together the ensemble "Let the marriage be approved". The figures of Sarvar and Gulnaz appear, and tar music is heard. Everybody sings "If not this one, then that one".

== The operetta as satire ==
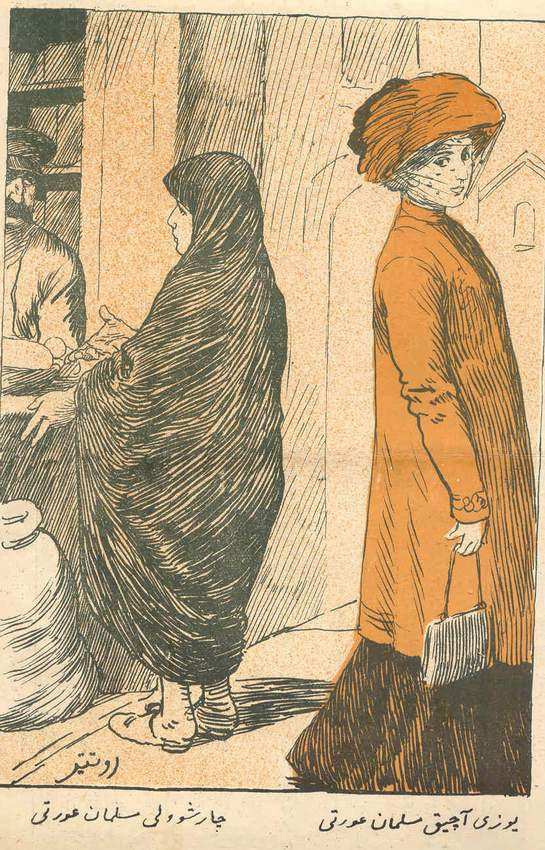
"Veiled Moslem woman and Moslem women with open face" from Molla Nasraddin magazine (No. 11, 1911)

If Not That One, Then This One is considered one of the major comedies of prerevolutionary Azerbaijan, ranked with the satirical works of Mirza Fatali Akhundov and Jalil Mammadguluzadeh. Hajibeyov describes social and everyday reality in Azerbaijan at the end of the 19th and beginning of the 20th centuries. According to musician Elmira Abbasova, the characters are typical representatives of that time.

Hajibeyov ridicules commonplace family prejudices of his time, when a woman had to agree with demands of her father, such as marrying to an old man, or sitting under lock and key if her husband wants, and who can be disowned for her disobedience. According to Matthew O'Brian, support of woman rights is the central point of Uzeyir Hajibeyov's comedy. Gulnaz and Sarvar are real heroes of the comedy. They are new people, without prejudices and thirst for money. Unlike other heroes of Hajibeyov's operas, they are characterized as active persons, who do not accept a passive approach to their destiny. They understand that the old pressures are now weak. The servant Senem also understands this, intercepting the dispute with Rustam bey and supporting Gulnaz.

According to Elmira Abbasova, Mashadi Ibad is a respectable person in a high society. His power is his money, and he feel no pangs of conscience for the ruined lives of his wives. Indeed, he can ruin Gulnaz's life, too. Her beauty and youth do not dissuade him; his attitude to love is "if not this one, then that one". But in the comedy it leads to his downfall.

The images of the nobility-merchant classes are sharply drawn. Rustam bey, who wants to sell his only beautiful daughter to Mashadi Ibad is characterized by immorality, idleness and fear when facing inevitable downfall. similarly as regards Rustam bey's friends:

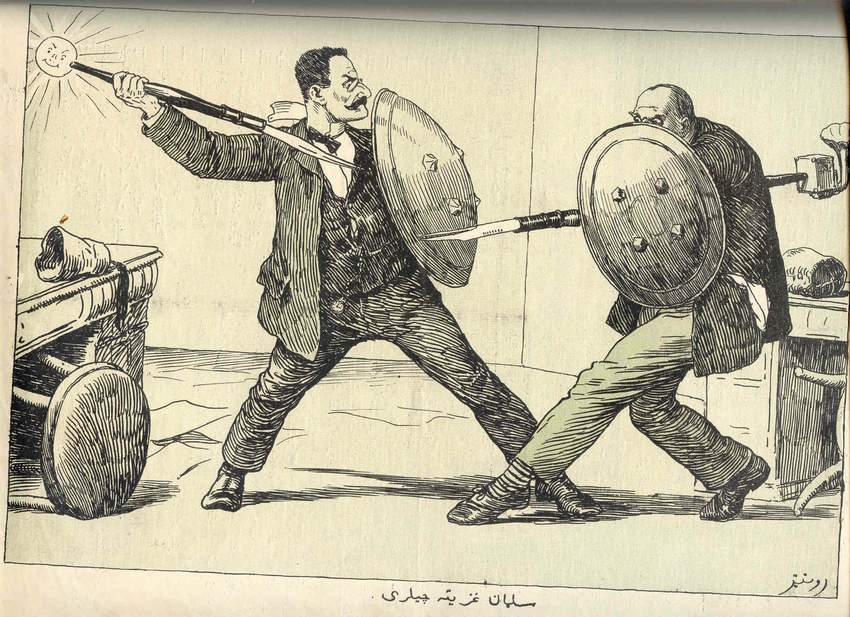
"Moslem journalists". Caricature from Molla Nasraddin magazine (No. 34, 1910)

- Rza bey, the journalist, who writes any libel fon money. His speech is hardly intelligible, as he mixes Azerbaijani with a Turkish-Ottoman accent when he speaks.
- According to Jamila Hasanova, the nationalist Hasangulu bey neglects the interests of those about him for the sake of his own benefit.
- The 'intellectual' Hasan bey, is characterized as alcoholic, idle talker and brawler. He is a pro-Western Azerbaijani who mixes Azerbaijani, Russian and French when he speaks, continually disrupting conversations and showing off.
- Gochu Asger is the leader of a local gang, who are brave only in front of the simple student Sarvar, but fear policemen.

The libretto displays many neat and aphoristic expressions. Musicologist Elmira Abbasova notes that Uzeyir Hajibeyov records the speech of representatives of various sectors of society of that time with precision and artistry.

The theme of satire of everyday life relations in prerevolutionary Azerbaijan, in which spongers, rich men, and rogues from various sectors of society were ridiculed, was familiar to audiences from other countries, for example, to Tajik and Uzbek spectators, and it found a keen response among them.

== Music ==
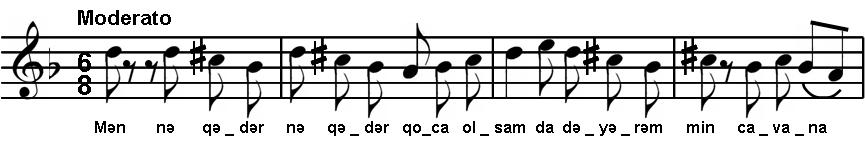
Fragment of Mashadi Ibad's song "In spite of my old age" performed by Mirzaagha Aliyev

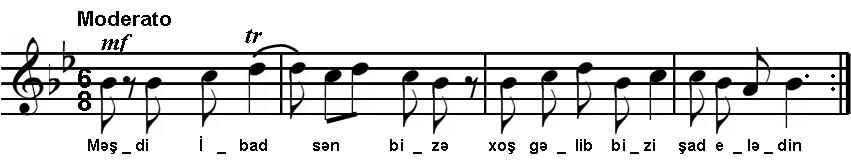
Duet of Mashadi Ibad with Rustam bey

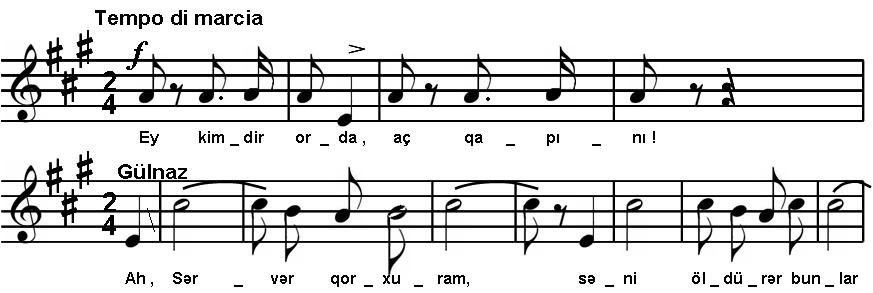
Fragments from Gochu Asger's chorus

Abbasova opines that all the music of the operetta forms an important component of the action, extending the characteristics of the dramatis personae, and promoting the active and natural development of events.

The music characterizes negative personages of the comedy with particular sharpness -Hajibeyov created for them original musical parodies which were based on tested expedients of national music and dance arts. The clumsy and arrogant merchant Mashadi Ibadm, the main anti-hero of the comedy, is presented with undisguised frankness. The song "In spite of my old age" is based on the traditional eloquent "Uzundara" melody, which is transformed by Mashadi Ibad's version in which he cynically argues about love. This song of Mashadi Ibad also appears at the fourth act party when he is about to remove the veil from the 'bride's' face.

The parody portrait of this unlucky groom is continued in subsequent passages; for example, the traditional melody "Darchiny" becomes a comic song for Mashadi Ibad and Rustam bey in duet. This melody is also now known as "Mashadi Ibad". Another duet of Mashadi Ibad with Rustam bey is pompous and march-like, suggesting the smug merchant.

Mashadi Ibad's trio with Gulnaz and Senem has a different tinge. The music acquires a sad and lyrical character, while groom feels the moral superiority of the girl over him. But anger and disgust can be heard in Mashadi Ibad's voice in the ensemble "It is impossible", because has now learnt about the love between Gulnaz and Sarvar. Abbasova remarks that music of this comedy reveals a m ore advanced and multifaceted portrait of character than its predecessor (Husband and wife).

== Film adaptations ==
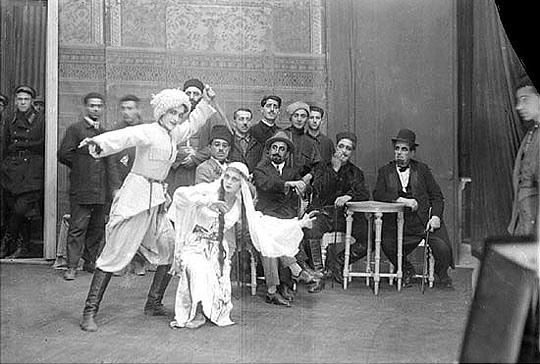
Act 4, Azerbaijan State Opera and Ballet Theatre, 1928. Director: Abbas Mirza Sharifzadeh

The operetta was first made into a film in 1918/9, in Aleksandr Khanzhonkov's Yalta film studio, directed by Papazyan and Lakko. But it was not successful and was soon forgotten.

Another film version of the play was produced by the Baku film studio in 1956. It was directed by Huseyn Seyidzadeh based on a script by Sabit Rahman. It featured Aliagha Aghayev (Mashadi Ibad), Aghasadyg Garaybeyli (Rustam bey), Tamara Gozalova (Gulnaz), Arif Mirzaguliyev (Sarvar), Mohsun Sanani (Gochu Asger) and Lutfali Abdullayev (Baloghlan). Celebrated singers of the time made cameo appearances in the film. A trio consisting of khananda Khan Shushinski (daf), Talat Bakikhanov (kamancha) and Bahram Mansurov (tar) perform the Seygah mugham in the dinner party scene at Rustam bey's house. People's Artist of Azerbaijan Amina Dilbazi dances in Gulnaz's preparation ceremony scene. The film premiered on January 27, 1958 in Moscow. It was screened at the International Film Festival of Asian and African Countries in Tashkent, in 1958.

In 2004, a cinema film Mashadi Ibad 94, starring Aygun Kazimova, was shot by Planeta Parni iz Baku studio based on motifs of the operetta, but set in 1994.

== Sources ==
- Libretto (in English), accessed 3 March 2015.
- Ahamadov, Hafiz (2010). ""O olmasın, bu olsun" Tehranda göstərilib", (in Azeri), in Anspress website, accessed 3 March 2015.
- Anon (2001). "O Olmasin, Bu Olsun", in Azerbaijan International, Autumn 2001 (accessed 3 March 2015).
- Kazimzadeh, Aydin (2010). "O olmasin, bu olsun: Azerbaijan's Sound of Music", in Visions of Azerbaijan, January/February 2010, accessed 3 March 2015.
- Мусульманская оперетта: произведение У.Гаджибекова. О постановке оперетты «О олмасын, бу олсун» труппой общества «Ниджат» // «Каспий» : газета. 1913.
- Петрова К. О гастрольных спектаклях Азербайджанского. тетра музыкальной комедии в Москве, в том числе и окомедии «Не та, так эта». // «Музыкальная жизнь» : журнал. 1965. No. 14. pp. 7–8.
- Эльмира Абасова. Узеир Гаджибеков. – Баку: Азербайджанское государственное издательство, 1975. 142 pp.
- Театр музыкальной комедии в новом здании первый спектакль-произведение У.Гаджибекова «Не та, так эта». // «Бакинский рабочий» : газета. 1998.
- С. Мирзоева. И снова на сцене «Мешади Ибад». // «Бакинский рабочий» : газета. 1998.
- Р. Халилов. Дань памяти. // «Вышка» : газета. 1998.
