= The Cloth Peddler (1917 film) =

1917 film by Boris Svetlov

- Arshin Mal Alan film poster
- Directed by: Boris Svetlov
- Written by: Uzeyir Hajibeyov
- Starring: Huseynqulu Sarabski, Ahmed Aghdamski, Alakbar Huseynzade, Mirzaagha Aliyev
- Narrated by: Nirav Mehta
- Cinematography: Grigory Lemberg
- Distributed by: "Filma" Shareholders' Association
- Release date: January 3, 1917
- Country: Russian Empire
- Language: Azerbaijani

The Cloth Peddler (Azerbaijani: Arşın Mal Alan) was a full-length Russian comedy-drama film and Azerbaijani silent film made in the capital city Baku in pre-Soviet Union 1917, based on the operetta by the Azerbaijani composer Uzeyir Hajibeyov.

== Plot ==
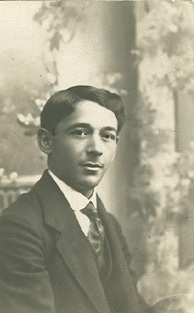
Ahmed Aghdamski played the female role of Guelchoehra, Asgar's beloved

Set in Baku at the turn of the 20th century, a young successful businessman Asgar (Huseynqulu Sarabski) wishes to marry. He wants his bride to be the choice of his heart, however, Azerbaijani tradition restricted him from communicating with the lady as a lover before marriage. So Asgar decides to disguise himself as a mere cloth peddler and the young woman Guelchoehra (Ahmed Aghdamski) falls in love with him. However, she is concerned that her father, Soltan bey (Alakbar Huseynzade) will not allow her to marry a cloth peddler. Young Asgar then reveals himself to her father and asks for her hand in marriage. Seeing that he is indeed a wealthy young man, the father agrees and the two are permitted to marry.

== Cast ==
- Huseynqulu Sarabski (Asgar)
- Ahmed Aghdamski (Guelhohra)
- Alakbar Huseynzade (Soltan bey)
- Yunis Narimanov (Jahan khala)
- Mirzaagha Aliyev (Suleyman)
- Alexandra Olenskaya (Asya)
- Hanafi Terequlov (Vali)
- Yeva Olenskaya (Telli)

== Release ==
The film was remade into a more popular version in 1945 and was performed on the stage in Azerbaijan. For the 1945 remake see The Cloth Peddler.

== See also ==
- List of Azerbaijani films: 1898-1919

== External links and sources ==
- The Cloth Peddler at IMDb
