= Mukhtar Dadashov =

Soviet actor, camera operator, and film director (1913–1998)

- Muxtar Dadaşov
- Born: 11 September 1913; Baku, Russian Empire
- Died: 7 May 1998 (aged 84); Baku, Azerbaijan
- Occupations: Film director; screenwriter; theater actor; film actor
- Political party: CPSU

Mukhtar Baba oglu Dadashev (Azerbaijani: Muxtar Baba oğlu Dadaşov; 11 September 1913 – 7 May 1998) was a Soviet and Azerbaijani theater and film actor, film director, screenwriter and cameraman. He was a Honored Artist of the Azerbaijan SSR (1960), People's Artist of the Azerbaijan SSR (1976), laureate of the State Prize of the Azerbaijan SSR (1980) and member of the CPSU since 1942.

== Life ==
Mukhtar Dadashov was born on September 11, 1913, in Baku. He appeared on the stage of the Azerbaijan State Academic National Drama Theatre for the first time in 1924, and four years later he played the role of Gunduzu in the first performance of Jafar Jabbarli's play "Sevil". In 1929, he started working as a director's assistant at the Azerbaijan State Theatre of Young Spectators. In 1933, he studied basic cameramanship in Moscow. In 1943, he was recruited by the Soviet Union to film the crimes of the Nazis. The videos he took at this time were shown as evidence during the Nuremberg trials.

== Filmography ==
List: Movie roles

- 1934 - Living god (Abdurrahim)
- 1969 - In a southern city (Hasan)

Director

- 1968 - For the sake of the law
- 1974 - Winds are blowing in Baku

Screenwriter

- 1945 - The Cloth Peddler
- 1968 - For the sake of the law
- 1974 - Winds are blowing in Baku

Operator

- 1940 - New Horizon
- 1943 - Submarine T-9
- 1945 - The Cloth Peddler
- 1947 - Beyond Araz
- 1955 - Bakhtiar

== Awards ==
List:

- Order of the Badge of Honour (1946)
- Special prize at the international film festival held in Cannes for the documentary film "Soviet Azerbaijan" (1951)
- Honored Artist of the Azerbaijan SSR (1960)
- People's Artist of the Azerbaijan SSR (1976)
- State Prize of the Azerbaijan SSR (1980)
- Honorary diploma of the Republic of Azerbaijan (1993)
- Shohrat Order (1998)
