= The Oil Gush in Balakhany =

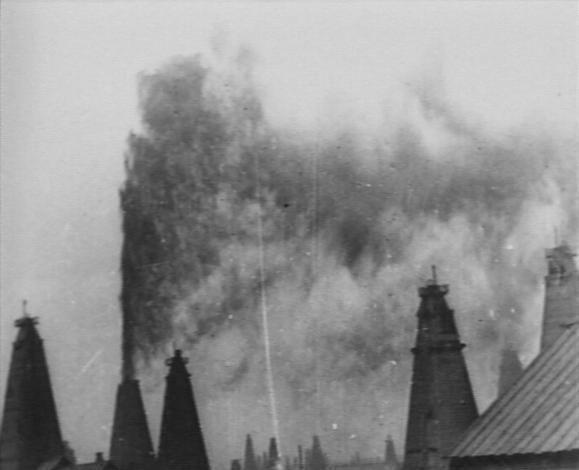
- Directed by: Alexandre Michon
- Written by: Alexandre Michon
- Produced by: Alexandre Michon
- Music by: none
- Release date: August 6, 1898
- Running time: 30 seconds
- Country: Russian Empire

The Oil Gush in Balakhany (Azerbaijani: Balaxanıda neft fontanı) is a Russian film written and directed by the pioneer of cinema in Azerbaijan, Alexandre Michon. It was filmed on August 4, 1898, in Balakhany, Baku and presented at the International Paris Exhibition. The film was shot using a 35 mm film on a Lumière cinematograph and is considered the first film in Azerbaijani cinematography. It depicts a blowout from an oil well in the Balakhany village of Baku.

== See also ==
- List of Azerbaijani films before 1920
