= Azerbaijan State Academic Theatre of Musical Comedy =

Musical theatre in Baku

Azerbaijan State Theatre of Musical Comedy
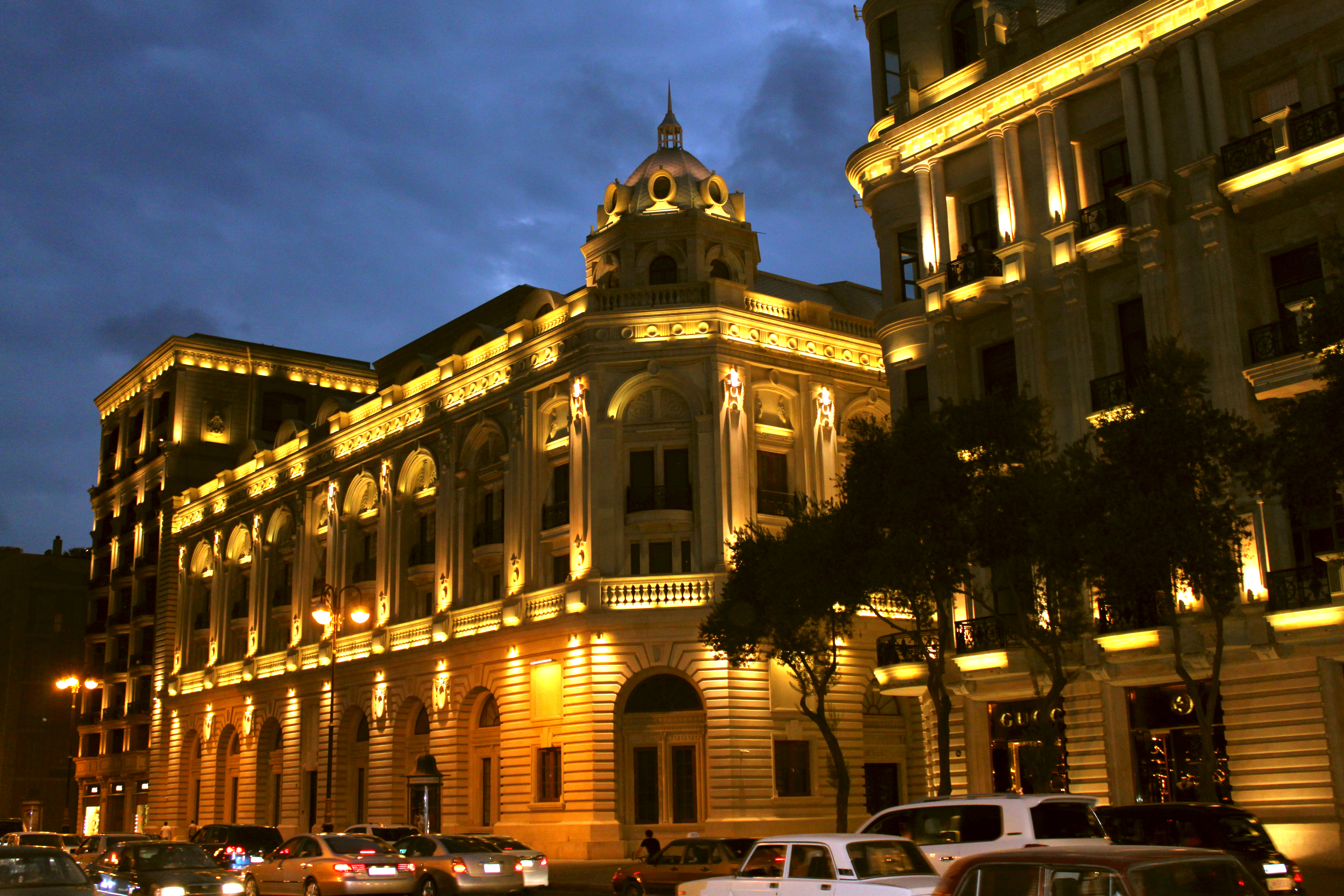
- Interactive map of Azerbaijan State Theatre of Musical Comedy
- Address: Z. Aliyeva St. 8 Baku Azerbaijan
- Coordinates: 40°22′08″N 49°50′24″E

Construction
- Opened: 1982

Website
- musiqiliteatr.az

Azerbaijan State Theatre of Musical Comedy (Azerbaijani: Azərbaycan Dövlət Musiqili Komediya Teatrı) is one of the leading musical theatres of Azerbaijan.

== History ==
The premiere of Husband and wife, a musical comedy written by Uzeyir Hajibeyov in 1909, was held on May 24, 1910, in the building of the Nikitin brothers’ circus, in Baku. This production laid the foundation of Azerbaijan State Theatre of Musical Comedy. By 1938, musical comedies were displayed on the stage of Azerbaijan State Academic Opera and Ballet Theater.

In 1938, an independent theatre of musical comedy (with Azerbaijani and Russian departments), which acquired official status of "Azerbaijan State Theatre of Musical Comedy" in September of the same year, was organized. In 1939, the first Azerbaijani and Soviet musical comedies such as Bride for 5 manats (S. Rustamov), Husband and wife, The married bachelor, (later Whose wedding?) (A.Mashadibeyov) and Roza (S. Hajibeyov) were staged. Comedies such as Blue mazurka (Franz Lehár), Arshin mal alan (U. Hajibeyov), The Circus Princess (Imre Kálmán), Wedding in Malinovka (B. Aleksandrov) and others were staged by the Russian department of the theatre.

From the 1940s onwards, the theatre took a significant place in cultural life of Azerbaijan.

The absence of a building for the theatre in the period 1988–1992, coupled with socio-political events in the new Republic, affected the creative activity of the theatre's collective. However, the theatre then entered into a new stage of its development, in a new building. Among the pieces presented were: If Not That One, Then This One, Konul, Love on the stage, Goodbye!, Everyone has his own star, and others.
