= Oil Extraction (film) =

1907 Azerbaijani film by Vasil Amashukeli

Neftin çıxarılması
- Directed by: Vasil Amashukeli
- Written by: Vasil Amashukeli
- Produced by: Vasil Amashukeli
- Release date: 1907
- Country: Russian Empire

Oil Extraction (Azerbaijani: Neftin çıxarılması) is a 1907 Russian film directed by Vasil Amashukeli.

The film was shot on 35mm and captures oil extraction in Azerbaijan in the early twentieth century.

== See also ==
- List of Azerbaijani films: 1898-1919
