= The Magic Gown =

- Azerbaijani: Sehrli xalat
- Directed by: Alisattar Atakishiyev
- Written by: Alexandr Tarasov; Alisattar Atakishiyev
- Music by: Arif Malikov
- Production company: Azerbaijanfilm
- Release date: 1964
- Running time: 75 min.
- Countries: Azerbaijan SSR, Soviet Union
- Languages: Russian, Azerbaijani

The Magic Gown (Azerbaijani: Sehrli xalat) is a 1964 Soviet fantasy comedy film directed by Alisattar Atakishiyev.

== Plot ==
Set in the mid-20th century, the story follows a group of Azerbaijani Pioneer students preparing for the 40th anniversary of the Pioneer Organization in a renovated Shah Palace. Their adventure begins when a famous magician, Io-Kio, presents them with a magic gown that transports them through time, allowing them to experience both the past and the future.

== About the film ==
- The character Rəşid was voiced by Yusif Sheikhov in the Azerbaijani version of the film, as Azər Qurbanov, who played the role, is Russian-speaking.
- Around 500-600 children auditioned for the roles of pioneers.
- The film's soundtrack is the first film music composed by Arif Malikov.
- A documentary titled "50 Years of Magic" was made about the film.
- In 2014, the 50th anniversary of the film was celebrated.
- The film was shot in the Maştağa settlement and the Old City of Baku, as well as in the village of Culyan in the Ismayilli region and in a studio in the capital of the Belarusian SSR, Minsk.

== Cast ==
- Rashid Mirzayev - main role - Azer Gurbanov
- Zarifa - the main role - Solmaz Hatamova
- Petya - the main role - Kolya Loginov
- Eldar - main role - Yusif Sheikhov
- Khan - Aliagha Aghayev
- Io-Kio - Anatoly Falkovich
- Mohsun Aghayev — Mohsun Sanani
- Chief Vizier - Aghahussein Javadov
- Referee - Ismail Osmanly
- Vizier - Husseinagha Sadygov
- Astrologer - Mammad Sadygov
- Serdar — Afrasiyab Mammadov
- The old man - Alekber Husseinzade
- Merchant - Ali Khalilov
- Merchant - Mammadsadyg Nuriyev
- Commander - Bahadur Aliyev
- Policeman - Talat Rahmanov
- Treasurer - Mollagha Babirli
- Teacher "in the future" - Lutfi Mammadbeyli
- Sakina - Almaz Ahmedova
- Sage - Nazim Mustafayev
- Circus artist - Arif Madatov
