= Magsud Ibrahimbeyov =

Azerbaijani writer (1935–2016)

Magsud Mammadibrahim oglu Ibrahimbeyov, also spelled Ibragimbekov (Azerbaijani: Maqsud İbrahimbəyov; 11 May 1935 – 22 March 2016), was a Soviet and Azerbaijani writer and member of the National Assembly of Azerbaijan.

== Life and contributions ==
Ibrahimbeyov was born in Baku, Azerbaijan to Mammad Ibrahimbeyov and Fatima Meshadibeyova. He was the older brother of Rustam Ibragimbekov, a prominent Azerbaijani screenwriter. In 1960, he received a B.A. in Industrial and Civil Construction from Baku Polytechnical Institute. He later worked at the Azerbaijan SSR Ministry of Construction and tried himself as a reporter representing Azerbaijan at the All-Union Radio and Television. At this stage he began focusing on literary studies and attended courses for advanced screenwriting and directing in Moscow from 1960 until 1964. Since after that time he became known as a Russophone Azerbaijani writer. Some of his plays were later acted out in theatres throughout the Soviet Union. He also wrote screenplays for 12 feature-length movies and 11 documentary films.

== Politics and criticism ==
Magsud Ibrahimbeyov entered politics in 1985. He was elected to the National Assembly of Azerbaijan twice: in 2000 and in 2004. Even though during the elections he ran as an independent candidate, he was known for his extreme loyalty to the ruling New Azerbaijan Party. When in 2005 an independent Azerbaijani journalist Elmar Huseynov (famous for his criticism of Azerbaijani authorities) was murdered, Ibrahimbeyov refused to stand in his memory during a minute of silence in the Azerbaijani parliament, which provoked severe criticism and hostility towards him.
