= Lutfali Abdullayev =

Azerbaijani actor (1914–1973)

Lutfali Amir oglu Abdullayev (Azerbaijani: Lütfəli Abdullayev) (22 March 1914, Nukha, Elisabethpol Governorate – 9 December 1973, Baku) was an Azerbaijani theatre and film actor.

== Career ==
Lutfali Abdullayev was born into a merchant family in the city of Nukha, presently known as Shaki. He developed his interest in acting while watching touring actors perform on the stage of local theatres. Actor Ahmad Anatollu noticed young Abdullayev's fondness and suggested that he be sent to Baku to learn about theatre from prominent Azerbaijani actors. At the age of 14, he started attending vocal classes and learning to play the horn at the Azerbaijan State Conservatoire. In 1939, he became a trouper at the Azerbaijan State Theatre of Musical Comedy where he worked until his death. Comedy became the main genre of his acting.

Main roles in classic Azerbaijani films (such as Vali in Arshin Mal Alan (1945); Balaoglan in the 1956 screen version of Uzeyir Hajibeyov's musical comedy O olmasin, bu olsun ("Not That One, Then This One"); Zulumov in Ahmad haradadir? ("Where is Ahmad?", 1965), etc.) gained Abdullayev great fame. He was reportedly compared to Igor Ilyinsky by Russian critics. He would often receive role offerings from various Russian theatres but chose to turn them down because of his poor command of the Russian language.

== Personal life ==
In 1942, Lutfali Abdullayev met 17-year-old Sevda Pepinova and four years later the two hatched plans to marry. However, Pepinova's mother was strongly opposed to this marriage due to class differences. Abdullayev was the son of a merchant and had no undergraduate degree, whereas Sevda came from a family of aristocrats whose wealth was largely expropriated as a result of Sovietization: her father Ahmad bey Pepinov, former minister of labour of the Democratic Republic of Azerbaijan (ADR), became subject to repression under Stalin and was executed in 1937, and her mother was the daughter of Hasan bey Agayev, vice-speaker of Parliament of ADR. It was not until 1956, when Pepinova's mother lying on her deathbed agreed to this marriage. Lutfali Abdullayev lived with his wife for the next 17 years and fathered two daughters, Gulnara and Khurshud.

== See also ==
- List of People's Artistes of the Azerbaijan SSR
