= Vasil Amashukeli =

Georgian film director and cinematographer (1886–1977)

Vasil Amashukeli ვასილ ამაშუკელი
- Vasil Amashukeli and Akaki Tsereteli
- Born: 14 March 1886; Kutaisi, Russian Empire
- Died: 1 December 1977 (aged 91); Tbilisi, Georgian SSR, Soviet Union
- Occupations: Cameramen, Director

Vasil Amashukeli (Georgian: ვასილ ამაშუკელი; 14 March 1886 in Kutaisi – 1 December 1977 in Tbilisi) was an early Georgian film director and cinematographer who worked in the Cinema of Azerbaijan and Georgia.

== Biography ==
Vasil Amashukeli studied at Vasil Tamarashvili Art School in Kutaisi. In 1908 he graduated from Moscow division courses of French film firm “Gomon”. Amashukeli is the first Georgian documentary director. Vasil worked as a mechanical engineer in the cinema opened by Ephemia Meskhi’s husband, Ivane Gepner and Kote Meskhi.

In 1907 Amashukeli working in Baku made several films of oil production in the capital including the extracting process. His films included Bakı Bazarlarının Tipləri (Types of Bakuvian Bazaars - short documentary), Daş Kömür Daşınması (Transportation of Coal), Dəniz kənarında gəzinti (Seaside Walk), Neft buruqlarında iş (Work at Oil Derricks), and Neftin çıxarılması (Oil Extraction) all filmed in 1907.

He then made several films between 1908 and 1912. These included: Nakhet tqveni sakhe, Gaseirneba zgvis sanapiroze (Walking on the Beach) (1908), Qutaisis peizajebi (Sides of City Qutaisi), Qutaisis parki (Park of Qutaisi) (1911) and Akakis mogzauroba (Journey of Akaki) in 1912, that is the unique monument of Georgian documentary art. This film led to the outbreak of the Georgia documentary cinematography.

The memories of Vasil Amashukeli about the journey of Akaki Tsereteli in Racha-Lechkhumi, together with the photos taken during the journey, are preserved at the department of Literature and Art of the Central Archive of the Contemporary History of the National Archives of Georgia.

== Filmography ==
As director

- Journey of Akaki (1912)
- Qutaisis parki (Short documentary) (1911)
- Qutaisis peizajebi (Short documentary) (1911)
- Gaseirneba zgvis sanapiroze (Short) (1908)
- Nakhet tqveni sakhe (Documentary) (1908)

As cinematographer

- Journey of Akaki (1912)
- Qutaisis parki (Short documentary) (1911)
- Qutaisis peizajebi (Short documentary) (1911)
- Gaseirneba zgvis sanapiroze (Short) (1908)
- Nakhet tqveni sakhe (Documentary) (1908)
