= The Window of the Sadness =

The Window of the Sadness (Azerbaijani: "Qəm pəncərəsi") is a 1986 Soviet drama film directed by Anar Rəsul oğlu Rzayev. It was adapted from the book "Stories from the Village of Danabash" by Jalil Mammadguluzadeh. Hasanagha Turabov, Ruslan Nəsirov, Həsən Məmmədov, Vaqif İbrahimoğlu and Leyla Shikhlinskaya play the leading roles.

== Plot ==
Mirza Jalil, who fell ill that day, returns home after wandering the streets of Baku. Painful childhood memories come to mind in his dreams. His childhood friend Ahmed and the unfortunate woman Zeynep and also remember other people in the village where he was born. He was able to attend school while his friend Ahmed was heading towards an unfortunate fate. One of the most important issues in the film is the rights and freedoms of women. Hudayar Bey covets his friend's wife and sets up traps to get her. The arbitrary behavior and hypocrisy of the mullahs, who interpret Islamic Law as they wish and apply it according to their interests, are told.

=== Story in the book ===
An old man named Muhammed Hasan, who lives in Danabash Village, takes a donkey to visit Karbala. Hudayar Bey, who is the headman of the village, borrows the donkey and goes to the city. He sets out to marry Zeyneb, the widow of his dead friend Haydar (without the woman's own consent). Hudayar left the donkey at the inn where he was staying and borrowed money. The kadi marries them with false witnesses (without the woman's presence, in absentia) by taking a bribe with two heads of sugar. Hudayar also tricks Zayneb's son and makes him work for himself. Muhammed Hasan, on the other hand, cannot tell the police his problem. He can find his donkey only after five years. The story in the book is similar with the movie.

== Bibliography ==
- Azərbaycan Respublikası Mədəniyyət Nazirliyi. C.Cabbarlı adına "Azərbaycanfilm" kinostudiyası. Aydın Kazımzadə. Bizim "Azərbaycanfilm". 1923-2003-cü illər. Bakı: Mütərcim, 2004.- səh. 305–307. (in Azerbaijani)
- Azərbaycan Milli Ensiklopediyası: Azərbaycan. Ramiz Məmmədov. Kino. Azərbaycan Milli Ensiklopediyası Elmi Mərkəzi, 2007.- səh. 816. (in Azerbaijani)
