= Journey of Akaki =

Journey of a Georgian Poet Akaki Tsereteli in Racha-Lechkhumi
- Directed by: Vasil Amashukeli
- Cinematography: Vasil Amashukeli
- Release date: 30 September 1912
- Country: Russian Empire
- Languages: Silent (Russian and Georgian intertitles)

Journey of a Georgian Poet Akaki Tsereteli in Racha-Lechkhumi is a 1912 Russian documentary film directed by Vasil Amashukeli. With a duration of 44 minutes, it is considered a feature film.

== Content ==
The film shows the love of Georgian society to the poet Akaki Tsereteli, as well as the nature and traditions of Georgia.

The director captured episodes of the journey. They shot about 1500 meters of film. After editing, 1200 m remained. About 400 m have survived to the present day. The film depicts the people's love for the poet, the way of life in Georgia, Georgian traditions, and nature. It is considered the first feature documentary film of Georgian cinema.

== Release ==
The film was first shown at the Radium Cinema in Kutaisi on September 20, 1912. Akaki Tsereteli attended the premiere. For two weeks, the film was held in Kutaisi with a full house.

A copy of the film is stored in the National Archives of the Ministry of Justice of Georgia.
