= In the Kingdom of Oil and Millions =

In the kingdom of oil and millions
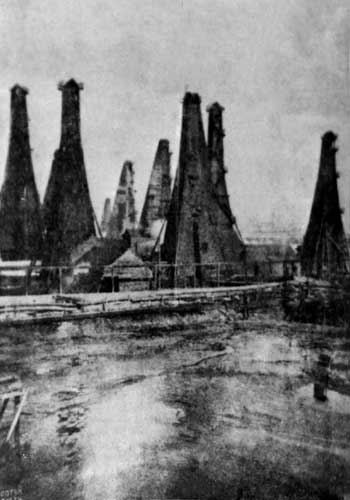
- Cadre from film
- Directed by: Boris Svetlov
- Written by: I.Musabekov
- Starring: Huseyn Arablinski; Jabbar Garyaghdioglu; V.A.Lenin; K.M.Piontovskaya
- Release date: 1916
- Country: Russian Empire (Azerbaijan)

In the kingdom of oil and millions (Azerbaijani: Neft və milyonlar səltənətində) – is an art film of 1916, shot by film-director Boris Svetlov basing on the motifs of I.Musabeyov’s narrative of the same name. It is considered the first art film in the history of Azerbaijan.

== Plot ==
The poor widow (Yuliya Orlitskaya), living near the city of Baku, brings income to her family by serving others. The mother gives her son to madrasah. But soon he was expelled from there. A desperate woman arranges her son to work next to the merchant Hasan (Vladimir Viazemsky). Several years later, Jalil's mother dies. Jalil returns home.

Jalil's poor house and a piece of land were next to the property of the rich Lutfeli bey (Hussein Arablinski).

Several years passed, the number of oil wells was growing throughout Absheron territory. Oil brings unimaginable wealth to entrepreneurs. After lengthy negotiations, Lutfali Bey and Jalil talked about cooperation and drilled an oil well in the courtyard of the second. Soon Jalil became rich, became the owner of lands, ships, mines.

Hearing the news of the death of his neighbor (Yuliy Ivanovsky), Jalil visits the house of the deceased; visits the daughter of an old man. His childhood friend Shafiga (K. Piontkovskaya) grows up into a beautiful girl and they get married.

Jalil does not hide his young wife from others, contrary to the customs. Lutfali bey fell in love with the beauty of Shafiga. He finds the right time and reveals his love. But Shafiga points to the door. Lutfeli Bey begins to take revenge, he is going to destroy Jalil.

Under the influence of Lutfeli Bey, Jalil is fond of drinking, gambling and other bad things, gets acquainted with a beautiful woman (Regina Lazareva) in a circus and spends a lot of money on her. A woman in cahoots with Lutfeli Bey travels with Jalil, takes money from him and runs away. Waking up, Jalil realizes that he is bankrupt.

During this time, Lutfeli bey took Jalil's house into his own hands and drove Shafiga away. Shafiga finds shelter in the house of elderly Gurban (Eugene Muromsky), who served next to her husband at the merchant Khasan. Jalil returns to Baku. He finds his wife and son. However, the heart of Jalil, which can not stand the hard times of his family, explodes. The slanderer Lutfali Bay offers Shafiga, who knows about Jalil's death, to marry him. Hearing this suggestion, Shafigi's patience wears out, and she stabs the knife into Lutfeli's back.

== Facts about the film ==
The film was shot based on the story of writer Ibrahim Bek Musabekov.

The film was first shown in the French electrobiography (current Baku universal store) owned by Haji Zeynalabdin Tagiyev.

The film is the first and last work of actor Huseyn Arablinsky in the cinema.

The film is the first work of Mehmet Alili in the cinema.

The film was considered the first film in Azerbaijan until recent years. That is, the history of Azerbaijani cinema dates back to May 14, 1916 from the date when the film was first shown.

The film belonged to the Pyrone Brothers

In order to make a film, Boris Svetlov and director Grigory Lemberk were invited to Baku from St. Petersburg.

The film was shown in many cities of Transcaucasia and Central Asia, apart from Baku.

Titles for the film are in Azerbaijani.

The film is the first full-length feature film in the history of Azerbaijani cinema.

The film was shot at the expense of oil entrepreneurs.

The booklet of this film is kept in the department of rare copies of the Republican Library named after Akhundov. In the brochure the content of the film was written in Azerbaijani and Russian, and photos from the film were published.

The second version of the film, based on the motifs of the plot "In the kingdom of oil and millions," was screened in 1980 under the title "Golden Rock". The director of this melodrama is Fikrat Aliyev.

== Cast ==
- Huseyn Arablinski – Lutfeli bey
- Mammad Alili – a student at mullahkhana
- Jabbar Garyaghdioglu – khananda
- Gurban Pirimov – tar player
- Madatov – dancer
- Mirmahmud Kazimovski
- V.A.Lenin – Jalil
- K.M.Piontovskaya – Shafiga
- R.F.Lazareva – Olga
- Yevgeni Muromskiy – Gurban
- Y. Orlitskaya – Jalil’s mother
- Y.Ivanovskiy – Shafiga’s father
- Vladimir Vyazemskiy – Hasan
- N.Dobrynin – a doctor

== See also ==
- Cinema of Azerbaijan
- Lists of Azerbaijani films
