= On Distant Shores =

On distant shores
- Directed by: Tofig Taghizade
- Written by: Imran Gasimov, Hasan Seyidbeyli
- Starring: Nodar Shashigoglu; Yury Bogolyubov
- Cinematography: Alisattar Atakishiyev
- Music by: Gara Garayev
- Release date: 1958
- Running time: 89 minutes
- Country: Soviet Union
- Languages: Azerbaijani, Russian

On distant shores (Azerbaijani: Uzaq sahillərdə) is a 1958 Soviet-era Azerbaijani war film. Co-written by Imran Gasimov, Hasan Seyidbeyli, directed by Tofig Taghizade, the film portrays the life of the legendary Azerbaijani guerrilla of the Second World War Mehdi Huseynzade, who fought the Nazi forces in the present-day Italy and Slovenia, hence the film's name On distant shores referring to the Adriatic Sea.

== Plot ==
Mehdi Huseynzade a.k.a. Mihajlo is the most wanted guerrilla in Yugoslavia and Trieste. Disguised as a Wehrmacht officer, Mehdi plots and successfully performs a terror act in a restaurant full of German officers. However, he is wounded by a spy (Carranti) infiltrated in the guerrilla forces. While recovering Mehdi is out of operations for a while. He occasionally paints and daydreams of returning to his native Baku after the war. While the Germans increase the award for Mihajlo, he carries out another daring operation on getting food supply from a wealthy Italian businessman for partisans.

Mihajlo usually plans and carries out his operations with his brother-in-arm Veselin and a young girl named Anzhelika. The three are part of a love triangle at the same time. Veselin loves Anzhelika, while she has a crush on Mihajlo. The latter also has some feelings to Anzhelika, but concentrates his attention on operations.

During the next operation Anzhelika is detained by the Germans, but she still manages to pass the necessary information to Mihajlo and Veselin. Thanks to the information, the two successfully accomplish the mission of exploding a movie theater and killing hundreds of German officers and escape from the chasing soldiers.

While the Germans start a massive search of Mihajlo, he encounters with Major Schulz, who is suspicious and about to detain him. However, claiming to be a poor, half-German, half-French painter by name Auguste Kraus, Mihajlo demonstrates his painting skills by creating a Schulz portrait. Believing that he is a painter, not a guerrilla, Schulz has no choice, but let go of Mihajlo. But when leaving Schulz's office, Mihajlo meets Veselin, and the two draw attention of nearby German soldiers and get engaged in a combat. The friends still manage to escape but mortally wounded Veselin dies in Mihajlo's arms.

Back in the guerrilla camp, Mihajlo receives another bad news: Anzhelika was also murdered. The revenge of outrageous Mihajlo turns to be costly for the Germans, as he explodes several hotels and facilities.

Mihajlo then finds Carranti and kills him before he manages to escape with a suitcase of money. Chased by the German soldiers, Mihajlo arrives in the village of Veselin's father. The Germans led by Schulz also come to the village and demand the local population reveal Mihajlo's whereabouts. While the locals do not betray him, Mihajlo does not want to put their lives under risk either. He leaves the house of Veselin's father and appears in front of Schulz, who to his horror realizes Mihajlo and Kraus are the same person. Mihajlo manages to murder Schulz but gets shot by the German soldiers. Again daydreaming of returning Baku in his last breathe, Mihajlo falls down, but the activated bomb on him explodes and kills the approaching soldiers.

== About the Film ==
- The film marks the first appearance of actor Nodar Shashıgoglu in cinema.
- It is also the first film for actor Hacımurad Yagizarov.
- The film was adapted from the novella of the same name by Imran Qasımov and Hasan Seyidbeyli.
- Javad Hekimli, who fought in the same partisan unit as Mehdi Huseynzadeh, also appeared in the film.
- When it was released, the film was watched by 27.5 million viewers.
- The film was the second film made in the Soviet Union about a scout.

== Festivals and awards ==
The film was awarded a diploma at the All-Union Film Festival in Kyiv in 1959, and composer Gara Garayev received the second prize for the film's music. The film was also the winner of the Tashkent Film Festival in 1959.

The German version of the film was screened in 1959 under the title Damals in Triest. In 2025, the film was digitally restored in Berlin through the initiative of Azerbaijan’s Embassy in Germany. In April 2025, the restored version of the film was shown at the Urania Science Center in Berlin, and the event was dedicated to the 80th anniversary of the victory over fascism.

== Cast ==
- Nodar Shashigoglu as Mehdi Huseynzade (Mihajlo)
- Yury Bogolyubov as Veselin
- Agniya Yelekoyeva as Anzhelika
- Alasgar Alakbarov as Ferrero
- Lev Bordukov as Carranti
- Andrei Fajt as Maselli

=== Film Crew ===
- Writers: Imran Qasimov, Hasan Seyidbeyli
- Director: Tofig Taghizadeh
- Cinematographer: Alisattar Atakishiev
- Production Designers: Jabrail Azimov, Kamil Najafzadeh
- Composer: Gara Garayev
- Sound Operator: Agahuseyn Karimov
- Song Lyrics: Y. Dolmatovski
- Assistant Director: Rufat Shabanov
- Camera Operator: Rasim Ocaqov
- Set Designer: Mirza Rafiev
- Set Cinematographer: Sergey Klyuchevski (credited as S. Klyuchevski)
- Film Director: Teymur Huseynov
- Assistant Camera Operator: Tofig Sultanov
- Conductor: Niyazi
