= Mammadagha Huseynov =

Azerbaijani painter (1929–2002)

Mammadagha Huseynov Məmmədağa Hüseynov
- Born: February 8, 1929; Baku, Azerbaijan SSR, TSFSR, USSR
- Died: January 20, 2002 (aged 72)
- Occupation: painter
- Awards: Honored Artist of the Azerbaijan SSR

Mammadagha Huseynagha oghlu Huseynov (Azerbaijani: Məmmədağa Hüseynağa oğlu Hüseynov, February 8, 1929 — January 20, 2002) was an Azerbaijani painter, People's Artist of Azerbaijan (2000).

== Biography ==
Mammadagha Huseynov was born on February 8, 1929, in Baku. In 1949, he entered the Art faculty of the All-Union State Institute of Cinematography in Moscow. After graduating in 1955, he returned to Baku and began work at "Azerbaijanfilm". He acted as a designer in up to 20 films. He participated in exhibitions held in Azerbaijan and foreign countries.

== Awards ==
- Honored Artist of the Azerbaijan SSR — December 23, 1976
- People's Artist of Azerbaijan — December 18, 2000
