= Huseyn Seyidzadeh =

Azerbaijani film director (1910–1979)

Huseyn Ali oghlu Seyidzadeh (Azerbaijani: Hüseyn Seyidzadə) (15 October 1910, Erivan – 2 June 1979, Baku) was an Azerbaijani film director.

== Life and career ==
Huseyn Seyidzadeh was born to a family of a merchant in the city of Yerevan (then part of the Russian Empire, now the capital of Armenia). He fled the city with his family in 1918 and settled first in Tiflis, and then in Baku. In 1936 Seyidzadeh graduated from the Gerasimov Institute of Cinematography in Moscow having been taught by prominent Soviet film directors such as Sergei Eisenstein, Mikhail Romm and Lev Kulidzhanov. He later worked at Lenfilm. Seyidzadeh directed his first film in 1943, with Leyla Badirbeyli in the leading role. This propaganda film entitled Ayna reflected on the themes of patriotism and heroism and was dedicated to the ongoing World War II.

In 1956, Seyidzadeh directed one of the most famous and successful cinematographic pieces in the history of Azerbaijani movie industry. The film O olmasin, bu olsun ("If Not This One, Then That One"), based on the 1910 operetta by Uzeyir Hajibeyov and set in the Imperial Russia, criticized backward traditions and celebrated emerging modern lifestyles. The movie was translated into many languages and within the next 3 years was shown in over 40 countries.

In Azerbaijan, Huseyn Seyidzadeh is renowned for creating popular films such as Dali Kur ("The Mad Kura", 1969), Gayinana ("Mother-in-law", 1978), etc.
