= Boris Svetlov =

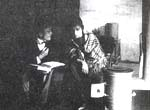
- Born: Борис Николаевич Светлов; 1880; Russian Empire: Orenburg
- Died: March 12, 1943 (aged 62–63); Soviet Union, RSFSR, Barnaul

Boris Nikolaevich Svetlov was a Russian film director and actor who worked in the Azerbaijani cinema in the mid to late 1910s and Lenfilm Studio in 1919–1926.

He directed the 1917 film The Cloth Peddler.

== Filmography ==
- The Cloth Peddler (1917) - full-length silent comedy
- The Wife (1916) - full-length feature film
- Arvadlar Ərlərini Mənsəbə Necə Çatdırırlar (1916) - full-length feature film
- Barefoot Love (1916) - short feature film
- Prince Demir Bulat (1916) (Tammetrajlı Bədii Film)
- In the Kingdom of Oil and Millions (1916) - full-length feature film
- An Hour Before Death (1916) - full-length feature film
- A New-Style Old Story (1916) - short feature film
- The Story of One Humiliation (1919) - full-length feature film
- Bortsy Za Svetloye Tsarstvo Tretyego Internatsionala (FIGHTERS FOR THE BRIGHT KINGDOM OF THE THIRD INTERNATIONAL) (1919) - propaganda film
- Vse Pod Ruzhyo (ALL TO ARMS) (1919) - propaganda film
- Pobeda Maya (MAY VICTORY) (1919) - propaganda film
- Proletargrad na Strazhe Revolutsii (PROLETARGRAD ON GUARD OF REVOLUTION) (1919) - propaganda film
- Lesniye Bratya (FOREST BROTHERS) (1921) - propaganda film
- Dolya ty Russkaya, Dolyushka Zhenskaya (RUSSIAN WOMAN’S LOT) (1922) - full-length feature film
- Career of Spirka Shpandyr (1926) - full-length feature film
- Chuzhiye (ALIENS) (1926) - full-length feature film
