= The Oil Gush Fire in Bibiheybat =

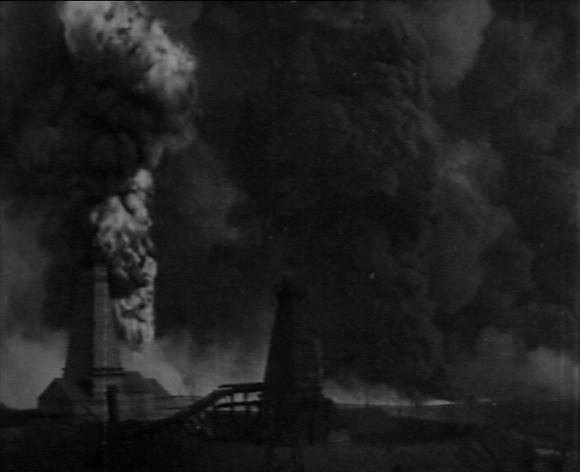
- Directed by: Alexandre Michon
- Written by: Alexandre Michon
- Produced by: Alexandre Michon
- Release date: August 6, 1898
- Running time: 30 seconds
- Country: Russian Empire

The Oil Gush Fire in Bibiheybat (Azerbaijani: Bibiheybətdə neft fontanı yanğını) is an 1898 Russian silent film. Written and directed by the pioneer of cinema in Azerbaijan, Alexandre Michon, this 30-second film was shot on August 6, 1898 in Bibiheybət village near Baku and presented at the International Paris Exhibition.

The film was shot using a 35mm film on a Lumière cinematograph. Some scenes from this film were also shown in France in 1995, in a footage commemorating the 100th anniversary of world cinema.

== See also ==
- List of Azerbaijani films: 1898-1919
