= The Cloth Peddler (1945 film) =

1945 film by Rza Tahmasib

- Romanian film poster
- Directed by: Rza Tahmasib; Nikolay Leshchenko
- Written by: Uzeyir Hajibeyov
- Starring: Rashid Behbudov, Leyla Badirbayli, Lutfali Abdullayev
- Cinematography: Alisattar Atakishiyev, Mukhtar Dadashov
- Distributed by: Baku Studio
- Release date: 1 October 1945
- Running time: 96 minutes
- Country: Soviet Union
- Languages: Russian, Azerbaijani

The Cloth Peddler (Azerbaijani: Arşın Mal Alan) is a 1945 Soviet-Azerbaijani romantic comedy musical film made in Baku, based on the operetta Arshin Mal Alan by the famous Azerbaijani composer Uzeyir Hajibeyov.

== Plot ==
Set in Baku at the turn of the 20th century, a young successful businessman Asgar (Rashid Behbudov) wishes to marry. He wants his bride to be the choice of his heart, but Azerbaijani tradition restricts him from communicating with the lady as a lover before marriage. So he decides to disguise himself as a mere cloth peddler and the young woman, Gulchoehra (Leyla Badirbayli,) falls in love with him. However, she is concerned that her father, Soltan bey (Alakbar Huseynzade) will not allow her to marry a cloth peddler. Young Asgar then reveals himself to her father and asks for her hand in marriage. Seeing that he is indeed a wealthy young man, the father agrees and the two are permitted to marry.

== Cast ==
- Rashid Behbudov - Asgar
- Leyla Badirbayli - Guelchohra
- Alakbar Huseynzade - Soltan bey
- Munavvar Kalantarli - Jahan khala
- Ismayil Afandiyev - Suleyman
- Rahila Mustafayeva - Asya
- Lutfali Abdullayev - Vali
- Mirzaagha Aliyev

== About movie ==
- The film has been shown in 136 countries and translated into 86 languages.
- The film was re-mastered and colorized in 2013 in Los Angeles at the expense of the Heydar Aliyev Foundation of Azerbaijan.
- The 1945 film was shot in black-and-white in the midst of Soviet engagement in World War II
- The Ministry of Culture and Tourism brought a copy of the film "Arshin Mal Alan" in the Moscow Film Foundation to Baku with the financial support of the International Bank, and organized a re-translation of it into Azerbaijani. The film was shown for the first time at its 60th anniversary on 16 May 2006.
- The film was screened at the Le Balzac Cinema in France in March 2018 within the framework of the Week of Foreign Films.

== Colorization ==
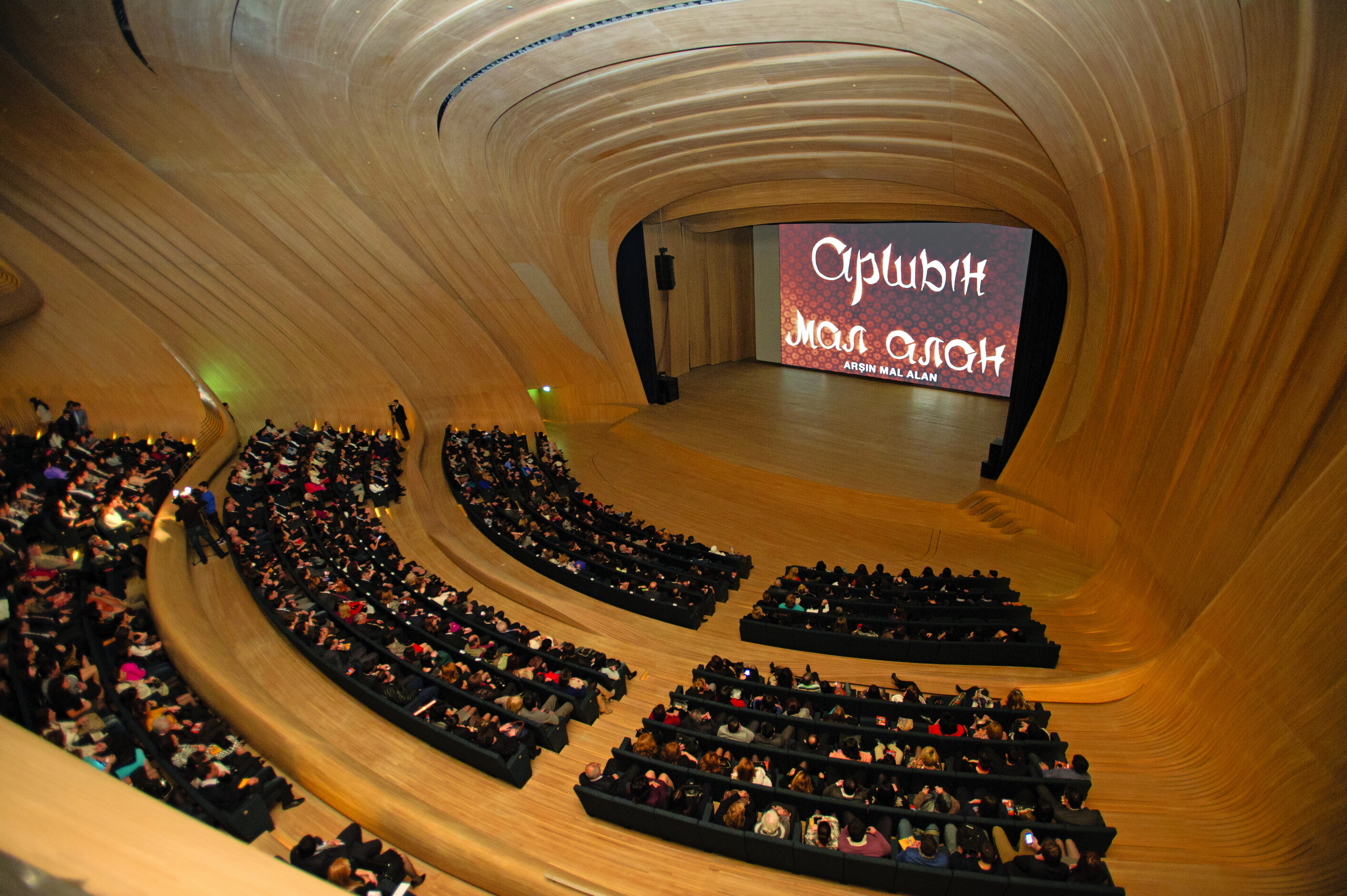
Premiere of the colorized version in Baku (2013)

The film was colorized and remastered in Los Angeles in 2012–2013. Its colorized version was premiered in Baku in December 2013.

The colorized version of Arshin Mal Alan (The Cloth Peddler), was shown on 19 September 2015 in Hollywood

== See also ==
- List of Azerbaijani films
- Arshin Mal Alan (operetta)
- If Not That One, Then This One
