= Alexandre Michon =

Russian film director and cinematographer (1858–1921)

Alexander Mishon
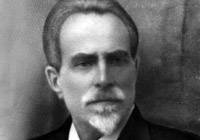
- Born: 5 July 1858; Kharkov, Russian Empire
- Died: 5 July 1921 (aged 63) near Samara, Russia

Alexandre Mikhailovich Mishon (Russian: Александр Михайлович Мишон; 5 July 1858 – 5 July 1921) was a Russian photographer and cinematographer. Born to a French family in Kharkov, he started his career as a photographer and owned a photo studio in his hometown. He later settled in Baku (now Azerbaijan) and lived there for 25 years. Here, in 1898, he shot his first films using a Lumière cinematograph. Mishon is widely regarded as the pioneer of Azerbaijani cinema.

== Filmography ==
- Balaxanida neft fontani (1898) (English: The Oil Gush in Balakhany)
- Balaxanı-Sabunçu polis idarəsi süvari qorodovoyların at oynatmaları(Balakhani-Sabunchu police station cavalry gorodovoy horse racing) (1898)
- Bibiheybatda neft fontani yangini (1898) (English: The Oil Gush Fire in Bibiheybat)
- Alahazrat buxara amirinin 'veliki knyaz Aleksey' paroxodunda yolasalma marasimi (1898) (English: Farewell Ceremony for His Majesty Emir of Bukhara on "Velikiy Kniaz Alexei" Steamboat)
- Ilisdin (1898) (English: You Stumbled)
- Qafqaz raqsi (1898) (English: The Folk Dance of Caucasus)
- Bazar küçasi sübh çag(Market street at dawn) (1898)
- Qafqaz və Merkuri cəmiyyətinin paroxodunun limandan yola düşməsi(Departure of the steamer of the Caucasus and Mercury Society from the port) (1898)
- Qatarin damiryol stansiyasina daxil olmasi (1898) (English:Train Entering the Railroad Station)
- Şəhər bağında xalq gəzintisi(People's walk in the city park) (1898)
