= Alakbar Huseynzade =

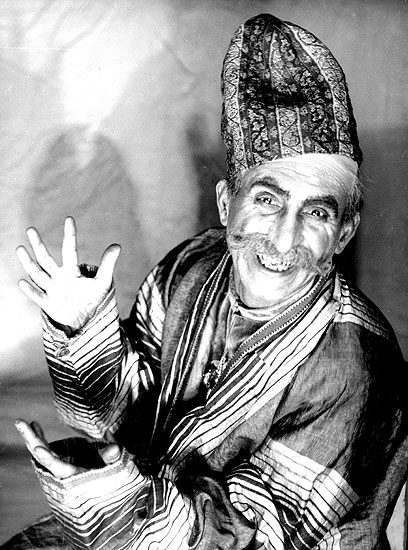
- Huseynzade as Soltan bey
- Born: 3 October 1887; Baku, Baku Governorate, Russian Empire
- Died: 4 November 1967 (aged 80); Baku, Azerbaijan SSR, USSR
- Occupation: Actor
- Years active: 1900s–1960s
- Known for: Role of Sultan Bey in Arshin Mal Alan
- Notable work: Arshin Mal Alan (1945), Almaz (1936), The Legend of Maiden Tower (1923)
- Awards: Honored Artist of the Azerbaijan SSR (1957); Stalin Prize (2nd class, 1946); Order of the Badge of Honour (1938)

Alakbar Huseyn oghlu Huseynzade (October 3, 1887, Baku – November 4, 1967, Baku) was an Azerbaijani theatre and film actor, musical comedy artist, and one of the first performers of classical operettas. He is best known for playing the role of Sultan Bey in the film Arshin Mal Alan and was awarded the Stalin Prize. He was honored with the title of Honored Artist of the Azerbaijan SSR in 1957.

== Life ==
Alakbar Huseynzade was born on October 3, 1887, in Baku into a jeweler’s family. After five years of studying at a religious school (mollakhana), he continued his education at a Russian-Tatar school.

He began his stage career on the initiative of stage teacher Samed bey HajiAliyev and performed the role of Molla Jabi in the play Greed Brings Enemies (Tamahkarlıq düşmən qazanır) directed by Najaf bey Vazirov. After this debut, he joined various theatre troupes and became known mainly as a comedic actor.

=== Death ===
Alakbar Huseynzade died on November 4, 1967, in Baku.

== Career ==
In 1913, Huseynzade gained great fame as the first performer of the role of Sultan Bey in Uzeyir Hajibeyli’s operetta Arshin Mal Alan. He portrayed this character both on stage and in film, and was awarded the Stalin Prize for his performance. He played this role on stage 600 times and twice in film.

The actor performed dramatic and musical roles in the “Nijat” and “Müdiriyyət” troupes and portrayed the following characters:

- Porter and Meshadi Ibad – Meshadi Ibad by Uzeyir Hajibeyli
- Keble Qubad – Husband and Wife by Zulfuqar bey Hajibeyov
- Haji Gara, Keremali – Haji Gara by Mirza Fatali Akhundzade
- Sheikh Nasrullah, Haji Hasan Agha – The Dead by Mirza Jalil Mammadguluzade
- Hasan – The Hungry Fellows
- Haji Farzali – Dursunali and Ballibadi by Sultan Majid Ganizade
- Molla Jabi – Molla Jabi by Mirmakhmud Kazimovsky
- Jester, Haji Samed Agha, Karbalayi Bendeli, Mirza Goshunali – Peri Jadu and The Unfortunate Youth by Abdurrahim bey Hagverdiyev
- Huseyngulu, Haji Salman, Haji Mammad Huseyn, Meshadi Javad – Dövlətibisəmər by Ismayil Rustambeyov
- Traveler, Adham Khan, Shah Sultan Huseyn Khan – Nadir Shah by Nariman Narimanov
- Iskandar Khan – Agha Karim Khan Ardabili by Najaf bey Vazirov
- Sergo – Sheikh Sanan by Huseyn Javid
- Officer, Abdullah Chavush – Homeland by Namık Kemal
- Count Ignatov – The Caliph of Sultan Abdulaziz by Mehdi bey Hacinski
- Yuhan, Saman – Armenusa and Khalid ibn Walid by Yusif Talibzade
- Bogdan – Greed by Ahmad Qamarli
- Lodovico – Othello by William Shakespeare
- Molla Nasreddin – Molla Nasreddin by Ghulamreza Sharifzadeh
- Emir – Yazid ibn Muawiya by Mehdi Hacibababeyov-Hacinski
- Turen – The Year 1812 or The Fire of Moscow by Bakhmetov
- Shaykh al-Islam – Old Turkey by Rza Zaki Latifbeyov
- Karbalayi Vali – Poverty, adapted from Ivan Turgenev by Jeyhun Hajibeyli
- Yuval – Uriel Acosta by Karl Gutzkow
- Babakishi, Haji Ahmad, Allahverdi – Sevil, Almaz, and In the Year 1905 by Jafar Jabbarli

In May 1920, when the Azerbaijan State Drama Theatre (now the National Drama Theatre) was restructured, Alakbar Huseynzade joined the company.

His stage work was distinguished by realism, sincerity, and vitality. He also performed in operas and musical comedies and was involved in stage directing. He staged plays such as Keble Khudu by Sultan Muradov, National Meykhana by Aliaga Vahid, and New Couplets by Baba Qubinski in Baku.

== Awards and honors ==
- Honorary title of "Honored Artist of the Azerbaijan SSR" — June 3, 1957
- Stalin Prize (Second Class) — 1946 (for his role as Sultan Bey in the film Arshin Mal Alan)
- Order of the Badge of Honour — April 17, 1938

== Filmography ==
- Almaz (1936) — role: Haji Ahmad
- The Sixth Section (1935)
- Arshin Mal Alan (1917)
- Arshin Mal Alan (1945)
- Our Street (1961)
- The Great Support (1962)
- Labor and Rose (1962)
- The Twenty-Six (1966)
- Creeping Shadows (1958)
- Black Stones (1956)
- The Legend of Maiden Tower (1923)
- Leyli and Majnun (1961)
- This Is How a Song Is Born (1957)
- Stepmother (1958)
- The Magic Robe (1964)
- The Life of Uzeyir (1981)
