= Cinema of Azerbaijan =

- No. of screens: 17 (2011)
  - Per capita: 0.2 per 100,000 (2011)

Produced feature films (2010)
- Fictional: 9 (45.0%)
- Animated: 2 (10.0%)
- Documentary: 9 (45.0%)

Number of admissions (2011)
- Total: 77,000
- National films: 6,600 (8.6%)

Gross box office (2011)
- Total: AZN 364,800
- National films: AZN 6,000 (1.6%)

Cinema of Azerbaijan dates back to the 19th century. Azerbaijan is one of the first countries in the world involved in cinematography. The first Azerbaijani film was a thirty second long silent film called The Oil Gush Fire in Bibiheybat, which was recorded using the cinematograph.

== Early history ==
The film industry in Azerbaijan dates back to 1898. When the Lumière brothers of France premiered their first motion picture footage in Paris on December 28, 1895, they did not know how rapidly it would ignite a new age of photographic documentation. The brothers invented an apparatus, patented in February 1895, which they called the "Cinématographe" (from which the word "cinematography" is derived).

A Frenchman by the name of Alexandre Michon was among the first entrepreneurs who came and settled in Baku. A photographer and cameraman by profession, he is believed to have lived in Baku for more than 25 years where he set up a photo studio. Michon became active in forming a scientific photo circle in Baku and became its secretary. From 1879 to 1905, he documented landscapes, episodes from oil extraction, the refining process, as well as the oil gushers and terrifying fires that broke out in the oil fields. In 1898, Michon began shooting motion pictures that depicted everyday life in Baku. It was his intention to exhibit them in Paris.

Michon's footages still exist up to date in the archives of the Union of Cinematographers of Azerbaijan. The Folk Dance of Caucasus was later used in a documentary, and the scenes from The Oil Gush Fire in Bibiheybat were shown in France in 1995, in a film commemorating the 100th anniversary of world cinema.

The Newspaper Announcement about Michon's films:

"On Sunday, August 2, 1898, A. Michon, will show some motion pictures that he has taken with a Lumière movie camera and which has been improved by the engineer Jules Carpentier. These films of the Caucasus and Central Asia have been prepared for the forthcoming International Paris Exhibition and will be presented only once in Baku at the V. I. Vasilyev-Vyatski Circus Theater.

"The following films will be shown: Fire resulting from an oil gusher at Bibi-Heybat oil field, Farewell Ceremony for His Majesty Emir of Bukhara on "Velikiy Kniaz Alexei" Steamboat, a folk dance of the Caucasus, and scenes from the comedy, 'So, You Got Caught,' which was performed recently in one of Baku's parks. For more detailed information, see the posters. The event starts at 21:00 (9 p.m.)."

The event was an enormous success and Michon repeated it on August 5, replacing the final two works with those showing life in Balakhani outside of Baku.

Michon's footage still exists. "Folk Dance of the Caucasus" was later used in a documentary and scenes from "Oil Gush Fire in Bibi-Heybat" were shown in France in 1995, in a film commemorating the 100th anniversary of world cinema. On November 27, 1899 writer, scientist and social activist Hasan Zardabi in the "Kaspi" entitled an article in which he wrote, "Now we have in our hands a toy machine-called "kinemato-graphe". This wonderful machine was produced only a short time ago and gives the impression of being just a toy. You can find this machine which is called 'stroboscope' in many optician shops."

== Early 20th century ==
In 1915 the Pirone brothers of Belgium set up a film production laboratory in Baku. They invited film director Boris Svetlov from St. Petersburg (Russia) to work for them and produce The Woman, An Hour before His Death and An Old Story in a New Manner. It was Svetlov who also directed the film entitled In the Kingdom of Oil and Millions which later became so well known. The famous Azerbaijani actor Huseyn Arablinski played Lutfali, the main role in this film.

In 1916 The first version of the operetta "Arshin Mal Alan" was directed by Svetlov. During this era of "silent" film the musical selections were performed by in-house musicians. Two of the women's roles in the film were played by men. Gulchohra was played by Ahmad Aghdamski and Aunt Jahan was played by Y. Narimanov.

In 1919, during the short-lived Azerbaijan Democratic Republic, a documentary called The Celebration of the Anniversary of Azerbaijani Independence was filmed on Azerbaijan's independence day, May 28, and premiered in June 1919 at several theatres in Baku.

== Soviet period ==
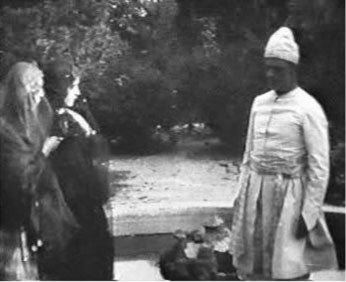
First Azerbaijani Soviet film Legend of the Maiden Tower (1924)

After the Soviet power was established in 1920, Nariman Narimanov, Chairman of the Revolutionary Committee of Azerbaijan, signed a decree nationalizing Azerbaijan's cinema. The People's Education Commissariat, which functioned somewhat like a Ministry, created an art department which included a film section headed by Hanafi Teregulov and Muslim Magomayev, a notable composer and opera singer. In 1922 the government of Azerbaijan decided to create the first cinema factory which became the forerunner of today's film studio Azerbaijanfilm.

In 1923 the Azerbaijan Photo Film Institution (APFI) was established by a special decree of the Council of People's Commissars. The Institution controlled all the movie houses and distribution bureaus. Thus, a new epoch in the history of Azerbaijani cinema began – a period when Soviet ideology, not individual entrepreneurship, dominated the film industry.

APFI shot its first film Legend of the Maiden Tower in 1924. This film was the first Azerbaijani Soviet and was based on the legend about the Maiden Tower.

In the 1930s, Russian director Boris Barnet filmed By the Bluest of Seas in Azerbaijan. The film, which is set on one of the country's islands in the Caspian Sea, has received renown from modern film critics.

== Post-independence cinema ==
In 1991, after Azerbaijan gained its independence from the Soviet Union, first Baku International Film Festival East-West was held in Baku. In December 2000, the former President of Azerbaijan, Heydar Aliyev, signed a decree proclaiming August 2 professional holiday of filmmakers of Azerbaijan.

Now that the USSR does not exist anymore, Azerbaijani filmmakers are again dealing with issues similar to those faced by cinematographers prior to the establishment of the Soviet Union in 1920. Once again, both choice of content and sponsorship of films are largely left up to the initiative of the filmmaker.

In 1995, the director Rustam Ibrahimbeyov won an Academy Award for Burnt by the Sun as Best Foreign Film. This moment is described as one of the proudest event in Azerbaijan cinema history.

== Notable films ==
=== Classics ===
- Babek
- Bakhtiyar
- Birthday
- In a Southern Town
- Interrogation
- Last Night of Childhood
- My Seven Sons
- On Distant Shores
- Our Teacher Jabish
- Shared Bread
- Sound of the Flute
- The Cloth Peddler
- The Darvish Detonates Paris
- The Day Passed
- The Kidnapping of Groom
- The Last Mountain Pass
- The Magic Gown
- Park
- The Road Story
- The Scoundrel
- The Secret of the Fortress
- The Stab in the Back
- The Stepmother
- The Tempestuous Kura
- Ulduz
- The Window of the Sadness
- Where is Ahmad?
- Wonderful apples

=== Modern era films ===
- Buta
- Dream
- Hail
- Nabat
- Neighbourhood
- Pomegranate Orchard
- Steppe Man
- Tahmina
- The Bat
- The Engagement Ring
- The Precinct
- The Scream

=== Cult films ===
- Nasimi
- If Not That One, Then This One

=== Indie films ===
- In Between Dying
- Poison Bottle

== Gallery ==
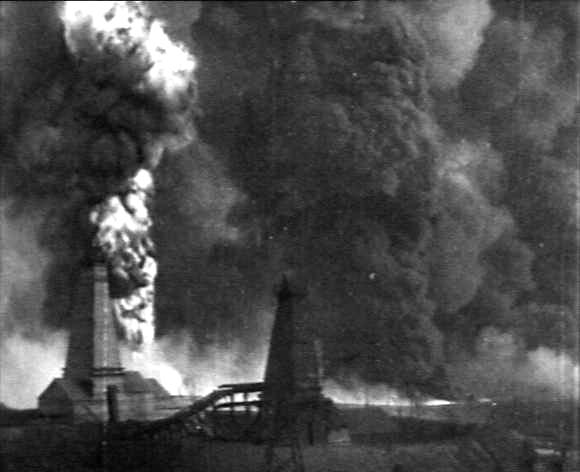
The Oil Gush Fire in Bibiheybat, directed by Alexandre Michon

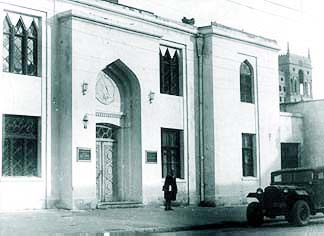
The first film studio in Baku established in the 1920s. The location of the studio was behind the Government Building in Baku. The building no longer exists.

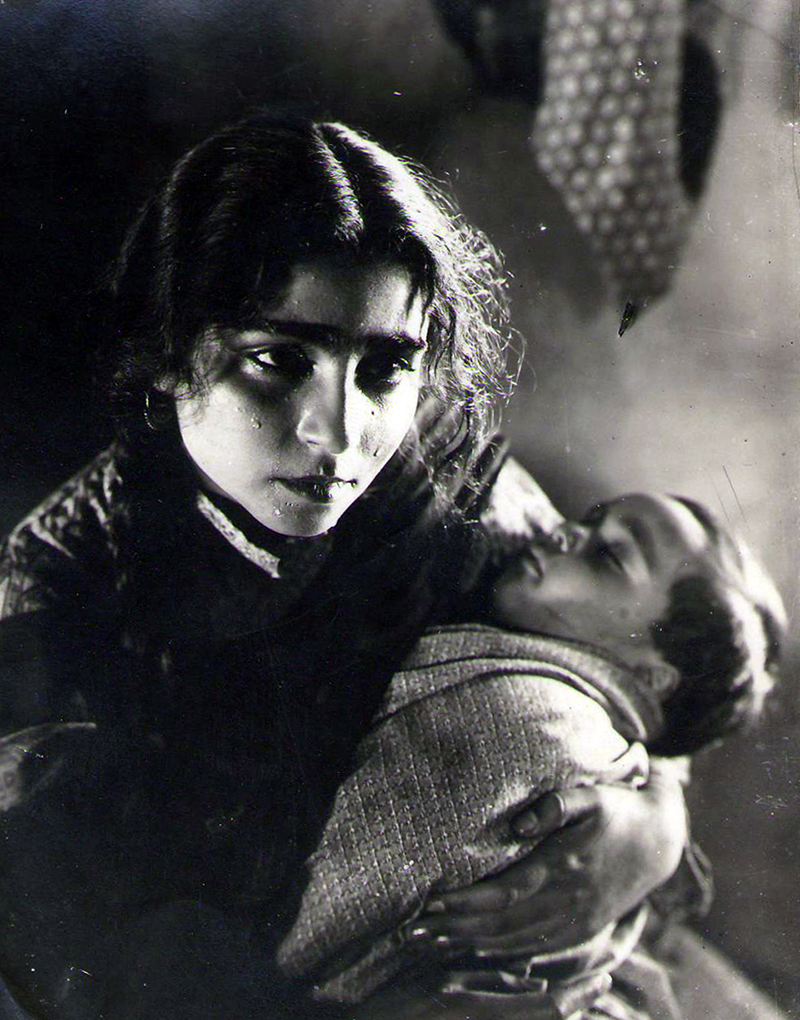
Sevil in 1932

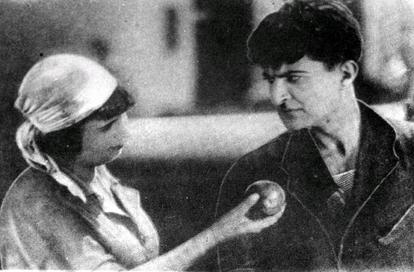
Game of Love in 1935

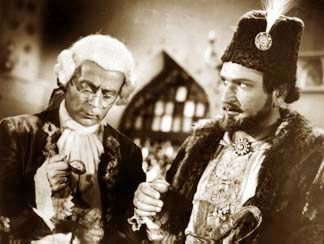
Fatali Khan in 1947

== See also ==
- Cinema of the world
- Lists of Azerbaijani films
- Azerbaijanfilm

== Bibliography ==
- Michael G. Smith, "Cinema for the Soviet East: National Fact and Revolutionary Fiction in Early Azerbaijani Film", Slavic Review Vol. 56 No. 4 (Winter 1997), pp. 645–678.
