= Vagif Samadoghlu Medal =

- Azerbaijani: Vaqif Səmədoğlu medalı
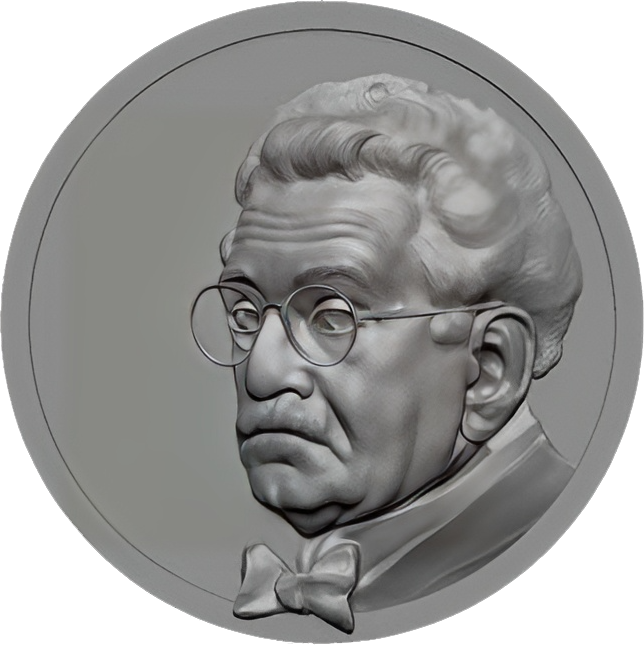
- Awarded for: propaganda of Azerbaijani literature and culture, especially the poetic heritage of Vagif Samadoghlu
- Date: 2019
- Country: Azerbaijan
- Presented by: Vagif Samadoghlu Center

Highlights
- First awarded: Anar (2019)
- Last awarded: Salim Babullaoghlu (2023)

The Vagif Samadoghlu Medal is a literary award named after Vagif Samadoghlu, a prominent representative of Azerbaijani poetry of the twentieth century, one of the pioneers of the "literary generation of the 60s" and one of the reformers of Azerbaijani free verse.

The medal, intended for famous figures of literature and culture, public figures of both Azerbaijan and different countries of the world, has been awarded since 2019 by the Vagif Samadoghlu Center according to two main criteria:

- For propaganda of Azerbaijani literature and culture, especially the poetic heritage of Vagif Samadoghlu;
- For contribution to world literature and especially world poetry;

The medal was made by sculptor and artist Kyamran Asadov.

== Winners ==
=== 2019 ===
- Anar
- Elkhan Zal
- Farid Huseyn
- Rustam Kamal
- Aliya Samadova
- Irada Musayeva

=== 2020 ===
- Dyusen Kaseynov (Kazakhstan)
- Samad Vakilov
- Kamran Asadov
- Ulviyya Heydarova
- Afag Bashirgyzy
- Valeh Karimov
- Kamran Yunis
- Khazar Suleymanli

=== 2021 ===
- Karim Valiyev
- Ramiz Hasanoglu
- Aryeh Gut (Israel)

=== 2022 ===
- Nushaba Babaeva-Vakilova
- Mobil Babaev

=== 2023 ===
- Salim Babullaoghlu

=== 2025 ===
- Rustam Dastanoglu

== Links ==
- Официальный сайт поэта
- В Баку вручены медали имени Вагифа Самедоглу (anl.az)
- В Москве состоялся вечер памяти Вагифа Самедоглу (culture.gov.az)
- В Москве прошел вечер памяти Вагифа Самедоглу (novayaepoxa.com)
- Yazarlara Vaqif Səmədoğlu medalı verilib (kulis.az)
- Vaqif Səmədoğlu Mərkəzi General Kərim Vəliyevi və Arye Qutu Mükafatlandırıb (strategiya.az)
- Bu şəxslər "Vaqif Səmədoğlu" medalı aldılar (bakupost.az)
- Xanımı Vaqif Səmədoğlu medalına layiq görüldü (axar.az)
- Bu şəxslər "Vaqif Səmədoğlu" medalı ilə təltif edildi (analoq.az)
