= Khudadat bey Rafibeyli =

Azerbaijani politician

Khudadat Rafibeyli Xudadat bəy Rəfibəyli
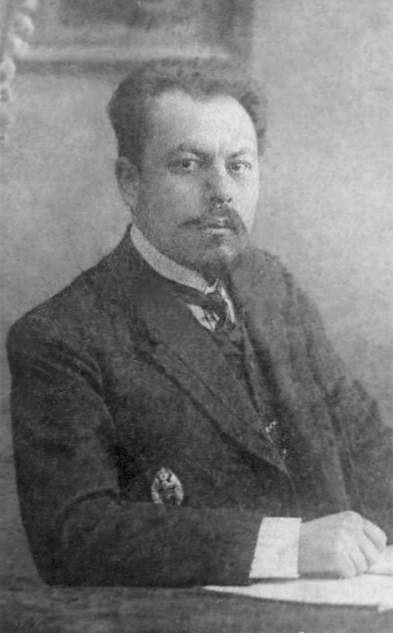

Governor General of Ganja Governorate of Azerbaijan Democratic Republic
- In office May 1919 – April 28, 1920
- President: Nasib Yusifbeyli Prime Minister, (Chairman of Azerbaijani Parliament)
- Succeeded by: office terminated

Minister of Healthcare of Azerbaijan Democratic Republic (ADR)
- In office June 17, 1918 – December 26, 1918
- Preceded by: office established
- Succeeded by: Yevsey Gindes

Personal details
- Born: 1878 Elisabethpol, Russian Empire
- Died: 1920 (aged 41–42) Nargin, Azerbaijan

Khudadat bey Rafibeyli (Azerbaijani: Xudadat bəy Rəfibəyli; 1878–1920), also known as Khudadat Rafibeyov, was a statesman who served as Governor General of Ganja Governorate and Minister of Healthcare of Azerbaijan Democratic Republic, and was also the member of Azerbaijani National Council and later Parliament of Azerbaijan. He was the father of Azerbaijani writer Nigar Rafibeyli, father-in-law of Rasul Rza and grandfather of Anar Rzayev, chairman of Writers' Union of Azerbaijan.

== Early years ==
Rafibeyli was born in Elisabethpol, Elisabethpol Governorate in the Russian Empire. Having completed a gymnasium in Ganja, he left for Kharkiv to study medicine at Kharkiv State University. Graduating in 1903, he returned to Ganja and began his medical practice. He is recognized as one of the first degreed professional surgeons of Azerbaijan. In 1914, he established the first Medical Society of Azerbaijan in Elisabethpol, providing the population with free medical care. After the 1917 revolution in Russia, Rafibeyli was elected a member of the Interim Executive Committee of the National Muslim Council and then member of Azerbaijani National Council.

== Political career ==
With establishment of the Azerbaijan Democratic Republic on May 28, 1918 Rafibeyli was given several posts within the government. On June 17, 1918 when the second cabinet of ADR convened, he was appointed to lead the new Ministry of Healthcare. While in office, he established several hospitals and medical laboratories throughout the country and opened the office of Red Crescent in Azerbaijan. For his contributions to healthcare within Russian Empire, Rafibeyli was awarded Order of Saint Stanislaus of the Third Degree. In May, 1919 Rafibeyli was appointed the Governor General of Ganja Governorate.

After takeover of Azerbaijan by Bolsheviks on April 28, 1920 Rafibeyli was executed by the Bolshevik firing squad without a trial on Nargin island just a few kilometers away from Baku.

== See also ==
- Azerbaijani National Council
- Cabinets of Azerbaijan Democratic Republic (1918-1920)
- Current Cabinet of Azerbaijan Republic
