= Yusif Samadoghlu =

- Yusif Səmədoğlu
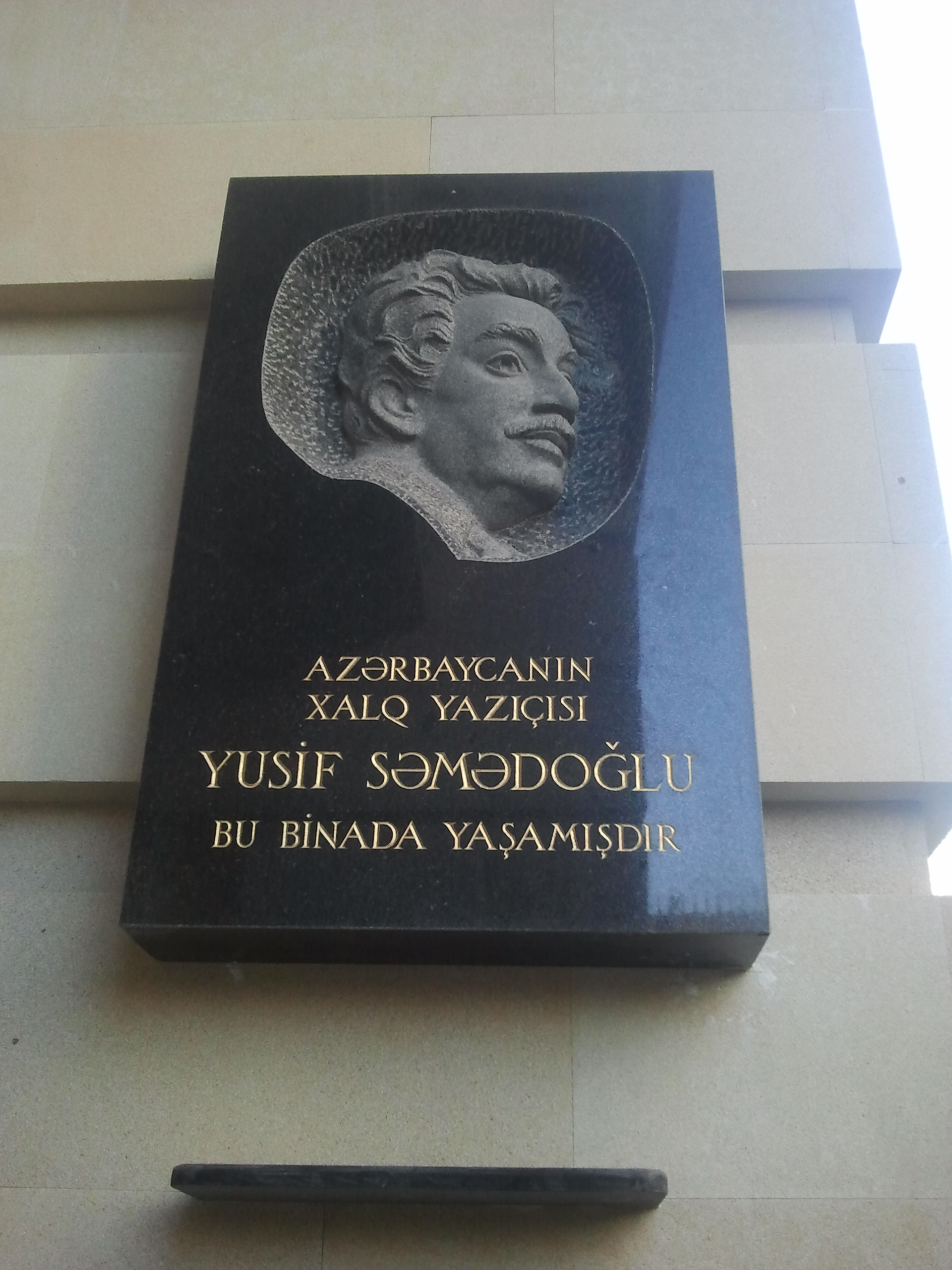
- Memory plaque of Yusif Samadoghlu in Baku
- Born: Vəkilov Yusif Səməd oğlu 25 December 1935; Baku, Azerbaijan SSR, Soviet Union
- Died: 17 August 1998 (aged 62); Baku, Azerbaijan
- Resting place: Alley of Honor
- Citizenship: Soviet Union; Azerbaijan
- Education: Baku State University
- Occupation: writer
- Relatives: Samad Vurgun, Vagif Samadoghlu
- Writing career
- Notable awards: People's Writer of the Republic of Azerbaijan Honored Art Worker of the Azerbaijan SSR

Yusif Samadoghlu (Azerbaijani: Yusif Səmədoğlu, 25 December 1935 – 17 August 1998) was an Azerbaijani writer. He was designated People's Writer of the Republic of Azerbaijan, and was a member of the Supreme Soviet of the Republic of Azerbaijan.

== Biography ==
Yusif Samadoghlu was born on 25 December 1935 in Baku. In 1953 he joined the Maxim Gorky Literature Institute in Moscow. He was transferred from the 4th year of the institute to the faculty of philology of Baku State University and studied there in 1957–1958. He has worked as a literary worker, head of the prose department in the editorial office of "Azerbaijan" magazine (1960–1965), member of the editorial board and editor-in-chief of the film studio of Azerbaijanfilm (1965–1969), Deputy Director of Azerbaijanfilm (1969–1976), Editor-in-Chief of "Star" Magazine (1976–1987), Editor-in-Chief of "Azerbaijan" Magazine (since 1987). Samadoghlu was elected to the secretariat staff of the Union of Azerbaijani Writers (1991).

He was a member of the National Council of the Supreme Soviet of the Republic of Azerbaijan, which was established on November 26, 1991.

The writer died in Baku on August 16, 1998, and was buried in the Alley of Honor.

== Works ==
He began writing his first stories in the 1950s and his first collection of stories was published in 1960 with "Yusif Vakilov" signature. With the recommendation of Turkish poet Nâzım Hikmet, Yusif took his father's name as a pseudonym — Yusif Samadoghlu.

Yusif Samadoghlu was developed in the 1960s as a prose writer. Cold Stone, Photo-Fantasy, Bayaty-Shiraz, Inja Darasinda and Astana are examples of his classic stories. In the mid-1980s, Yusif Samadoghlu wrote a book entitled The Day of the Murder, which became one of the most successful literary events of Azerbaijani literature of that time. The Day of Murder is about the world and humans. The work is essentially a global issue as it focuses on the human problem, the spiritual development of the person, and the need for greater perfection. In the 1990s, the novel was screened by director Gulbeniz Azimzade. As a result of a survey among writers in 2014, "The Day of the Murder" was selected as the best novel of the 20th century in Azerbaijan.

Yusif Samadoghlu was a writer on film art. He created a screenplay for the high-profile film My Seven Sons based on the motives of Samad Vurgun's Comsomol Poem (1969). Samadoghlu co-wrote the screenplay for Wind of the Land with Czechoslovak playwright Jiří Marek. This movie was the first film in the history of the Azerbaijanfilm studio in collaboration with a foreign studio (Czechoslovakia) (1971).

He is also known for his works contradicting the principles of Soviet ideology.

== Family tree ==
Yusif agha Vakilov	Mahbub khanım Vakilova
Rugiyya; Pashabayova	Mehdikhan; Vakilov	Samad; Vakilov	Khavar; Vakilova
Chichak; Vakilova	Javanshir; Vakilov	Yusif; Vakilov	Vagif; Vakilov	Aybaniz; Vakilova

== Awards ==
- Honored Art Worker of the Azerbaijan SSR – 30 July 1979
- Shohrat Order — 19 December 1995
- People's Writer of the Republic of Azerbaijan — 23 May 1998
