= Shorzha =

Shorzha may refer to:

- Shorzha, Armenia, is a village in the Gegharkunik Province of Armenia.
- Shorja, is a marketplace in Baghdad, Iraq.
- Nerkin Shorzha, is a small hamlet in the Gegharkunik Province of Armenia.
- Verin Shorzha, is a small hamlet in the Gegharkunik Province of Armenia.
