= Vakilov =

Vakilov (Azerbaijani: Vəkilov) is a surname of Azerbaijani origin.

- Javanshir Vakilov (1951–2013) was an Azerbaijani diplomat, candidate of historical science since 1988, public and political figure, writer and pedagogue.
- Samad Vurgun (born Samad Vakilov, 1906–1956) was an Azerbaijani and Soviet poet, dramatist, public figure, first People's Artist of the Azerbaijan SSR (1943), academician of Azerbaijan National Academy of Sciences (1945), laureate of two USSR State Prizes of second degree (1941, 1942), and member of the Communist Party of the Soviet Union since 1940.
- Vagif Samadoghlu (born Vaqif Səməd oğlu Vəkilov, 1939—2015) was an Azerbaijani poet, playwright, publicist, People's Poet of the Republic of Azerbaijan, Deputy of the National Assembly of the Republic of Azerbaijan.
- Mustafa Vakilov (1886–1965), was an Azerbaijani public figure, politician and diplomat. He served as the Minister of Internal Affairs (the youngest Azerbaijani minister).
- Mammadrza agha Vakilov (March 8, 1864 - December 30, 1944) was a member of the Parliament of the Azerbaijani Democratic Republic, full member of the Transcaucasian Medical Society, and founder of the Baku Medical Society.
