= Suleyman Rahimov =

Azerbaijani–Soviet writer (1900–1983)

- Süleyman Rəhimov
- Suleyman Rahimov
- Born: Suleyman Huseyn oglu Rahimov; 22 March 1900; Əyin, Zangezur uezd, Elizavetpol Governorate, Russian Empire
- Died: 11 October 1983 (aged 83); Baku, Azerbaijan SSR, Soviet Union
- Resting place: Alley of Honor
- Education: Azerbaijan State University
- Occupations: Writer, politician
- Children: Ogtay, Shamo, Arif, Agil, Shafiga, Rafiga
- Writing career
- Pen name: "Sangarli" (Azerbaijani: Səngərli, 1940s)
- Language: Azerbaijani
- Years active: 1930–1983
- Genres: Prose, opinion journalism
- Notable works: Shamo; Sachly; The Caucasian Eagle
- Notable awards: Hero of Socialist Labour

Suleyman Huseyn oglu Rahimov (Azerbaijani: Süleyman Rəhimov; 22 March 1900 – 11 October 1983) was an Azerbaijani and Soviet writer, novelist, prosaist and politician. He was a member and chairman of the Union of Azerbaijani Writers. Suleyman Rahimov was a prominent representative of the modern Azerbaijani literature. His creativity is closely linked to a great development period of the Azerbaijani prose. Rahimov's novels are among the noteworthy works of this genre. These novels are characteristic of covering epochal incidents, such as emotionalism, realism, psychology, and craftsmanship from the local folklore.

The birth and development of the new Azerbaijani novelty in the 1930s was closely linked to the writer's creativity. Rahimov started his writing career with a novel that remained the main genre of his prose during his creative activity. Shamo (Şamo) and Sachly (Saçlı) are his most notable works in this regard. In these novels, Rahimov described his characters via the great social events and conflicts of the era, and demonstrated their human qualities. He is also the author of many novelettes and stories that possess romantic and satirical nature.

== Life ==
=== Early years ===
Suleyman Rahimov was born in Əyin in the Elizavetpol Governorate of the Russian Empire, which is now in Qubadli District of Azerbaijan (Note: The Gubadly District was occupied by Armenian forces on 13 August 1993 during the First Nagorno-Karabakh War (1988–1994). It has been de facto controlled by the forces of the Republic of Artsakh as part of its Kashatagh Province.) on 4 April 1900. According to his memoir Road of life (Həyat yolu), Rahimov was born in a farmer family. He was raised by his father's uncle, Allahverdi. He received education in Allahverdi's Mullah house, but was sent to a Russian school in Gubadly on 1912. When he was 16, Armenian forces occupied Rahimov's birthplace and his family became a refugee. They settled in Qubadli, Qəzyan, Sarıl, Ağalı and other nearby settlements. During this time, he lost his mother and two sisters. In 1921, Rahimov went to Xanlıq (now de facto called Ishkhanadzor) and worked there as a teacher in a newly opened school. After receiving pedagogical classes in Shusha he worked as a teacher in multiple schools across Zangezur uezd. In 1928 Rahimov and his friend Ali Valiyev went to Baku and studied at the History faculty of Azerbaijan State University for three years. He then gave literacy lessons to old workers in Black City.

=== Writing career ===
Like nearly every survivor of the Great Purge, Rahimov expressed communist ideas in his works. Suleyman Rahimov started his writing career in 1931, with Shamo (Şamo), which he kept working on until 1978 and released 5 volumes. The series covers numerous events, characters through artistic imagery. There is no such series in the Azerbaijani literature. Shamo has a complex artistic environment. Artistic genius has a spontaneous importance in the novel, largely dependent on the forms of reality that take place directly in the writer's imagination. That is why, in the novel, the artistic principles of socialist realism are essentially intertwined with the writer's imagination. The characteristics and lifestyle of the Shehli village described in Shamo was patriarchal. Rahimov expressed the issues that other Azerbaijani writers of that time, such as Najaf bey Vazirov, Abdurrahim bey Hagverdiyev, Nariman Narimanov and Jalil Mammadguluzadeh did.

During World War II Rahimov joined a Soviet unit and moved to Tabriz, Iranian Azerbaijan. During this time, he wrote under the pen-name of "Sangarli" (Azerbaijani: Səngərli, lit. with trench). Rahimov wrote a novelette called Death of grandmother (Nənənin ölümü), describing the life of children in Tabriz. Suleyman Rahimov became the chairman of the Union of Azerbaijani Writers multiple times (1939–1940, 1944–1946 and 1954–1958).

=== Political career ===
Suleyman Rahimov was a communist. From 1934 to 1937 he worked in political professions in Lachin, Samukh, Shahbuz and Norashen districts. Rahimov then worked as Secretary of Propaganda at the Baku City Committee of Communist Party of Azerbaijan (1940–1941), Deputy Head of the Propaganda and Agitation Department at the Central Committee of the Communist Party of Azerbaijan (1941–1944), Chairman of the Cultural and Educational Affairs Committee under the Council of Ministers of Azerbaijan (1945–1958).

== Awards ==
He was awarded with "Golden pen" award of the Union of Azerbaijani Journalists on 1972, three times with Order of Lenin on 1946, 1970 and 1975 respectively, once with Order of the Red Banner of Labour on 1959, once with Order of the Badge of Honour on 1942 and once with Order of Friendship of Peoples on 1980. In 1960 he received the title of People's Writer, and in 1975 he received the honorary title of Hero of Socialist Labour.

== Death and legacy ==
Suleyman Rahimov died on 11 October 1983. He was buried in Alley of Honor.

Suleyman Rahimov is considered one of the most prominent 20th century Azerbaijani writers. There is a bust of Rahimov in Mirza Fatali Akhundov National Library of Azerbaijan. There is also a street named after him in Baku. A bust-relief of Rahimov was erected in front of his house in Baku.

== Works ==
=== Novels ===
- Shamo (Şamo; vol. 1–5, 1931–1978)
- Sachly (Saçlı; 1940–1948)
- In the mountains of Aghbulag (Ağbulaq dağlarında; 1955–1956)
- Monument of mother (Ana abidəsi; 1961–1967)
- The Caucasian Eagle (Qafqaz qartalı; vol. 1–3, 1971–1975)

=== Novellettas ===
- Voice of the Earth (1941)
- Aynaly (Aynalı; 1942)
- Medallion (Medalyon; 1942)
- Brother's grave (Qardaş qəbri; 1943)
- Death of grandmother (Nənənin ölümü; 1940s)
- Mehman (1944)
- Wish (Arzu; 1947)
- Cousin (Xalauşağı; 1944)
- Legend of the Gyuzgyugol (Güzgügöl əfsanəsi; 1960s)
- Relentless neighing (Kəsilməyən kişnərti; 1960s)
- Foremost eagle and raven (Baş qartal və alaqarğa; 1960s)
- Bahram and Zarafshan (Bəhram və Zərəfşan; 1962)
- To one's own solicit (Öz minnətinə; 1967–68)
- Kapaz (Kəpəz; 1969–70)
- Laughed (Uğundu; 1965)
- In the girls' residence (Qızlar oylağında; 1972–74)

=== Stories ===
- Mahtaban (Məhtaban; ???)
- Gudrat Gudratov (Qüdrət Qüdrətov; 1942)
- Towel with rooster (Xoruzlu dəsma; 1942)
- Water application (Su ərizəsi; 1942)
- Bashful guest (Üzsüz qonaq; 1943),
- Hag (Küp qarısı; 1943)
- Conscientious (Malyeməz; 1944)
- Envious person (Paxıl adam; 1944)
- Bread without solicit (Minnətsiz çörək; 1945),
- Rock of the bride (Gəlin qayası; 1945),
- Khahish-nameh (Xahişnamə; 1945)
- Village of Mozalan (Mozalan kəndi; 1945)
- Step (Ögey; 1945)
- Gravel of the nymph (Pəri çınqılı; 1959)
- Laughing fish (Gülən balıq; 1964)

=== Other ===
- From the book of the last days (Ötən günlər dəftərindən; 1946; memoir)
- Road of life (Həyat yolu; ???; memoir)

== Sources ==
- Gulaliyev, Aziz (2005). Süleyman Rəhimov. Seçilmiş əsərləri. İki cilddə (PDF). Vol. 1st. Baku. p. 288.
- Gulaliyev, Aziz (2005). Süleyman Rəhimov. Seçilmiş əsərləri. İki cilddə (PDF). Vol. 2nd. Baku. p. 312.
