= Salim Babullaoghlu =

Azerbaijani poet

- Azerbaijani: Səlim Babullaoğlu
- Born: Salim Salimov; December 10, 1972 (age 53); Ali Bayramli, Azerbaijan SSR, Soviet Union
- Citizenship: Azerbaijan
- Education: Baku State University
- Occupations: Poet; Translator

Salim Babullaoghlu (Azerbaijani: Səlim Babullaoğlu) is an Azerbaijani poet. Thousands copies of his books have been sold in his homeland and have been translated into more than ten languages. He is also an Azerbaijani novelist, essayist, journalist and translator. His books have been published in Turkey, Germany, Poland, Georgia, Ukraine. Hungary, Romania, Iran and Serbia.

Babullaoghlu was born on December 10, 1972, and graduated from Baku State University, Faculty of Library Science in 1995. For many years he worked as a journalist, editor in various literary institutions. He is a founder of the magazine "The World Literature". He is also a member of the Writers’ Union of Azerbaijan and the Bishkek Pen.

Salim Babullaoghlu is the author of poetry books such as "Lonely" (1996), "Nobody Writes to the Colonel" (2008, 2013, 2014), "Ilyas Gochman’s Photo Book" (2009, 2016), "Sentence Without First Letter" (2021), "Talk With My Son" (2022); essay books - "Literary Conversations" (2011), "Literary Dreams" (2015) and many other books on journalism and essays as well as translator, compiler and editor of dozens of other books. Over 200 books have been published under his editorship. He has translated poems by M. Eminescu, T. S. Eliot, Borges, F.H. Daglarca, O. Veli, B.Pasternak, C.Milosz, T.Trantrömer, J. Brodsky. V.Stus, B.Kharanauli and many other poets.

Babullaoghlu is a diplomate of the European Poet of Freedom (Poland / Gdansk, 2018) and also an Honorary Poet of the city of Iași (Romania, 2019). He was awarded with: Mikail Mushfig Poetry Award (Azerbaijan, 2014), the International Rasul Rza Award (Azerbaijan, 2015), The Golden Word-Chance Award (2010, Ministry of Culture of Azerbaijan Republic), the International Shahriyar Culture Medal (Iran / Tabriz University, 2018), Ivo Andric Medal (Serbian Royal Academy, 2019), Honorary Poet of the city of Iași (Romania, 2019), Vagif Samadoghlu Medal (2022), Nizami Ganjavi Medal (Azerbaijan, 2021), The Personalitate Gold Medal (Moldova, Chișinău, 2023). He is a founder of the magazine "The World Literature". He is a founder of the magazine "The World Literature". He is also a member of the Writers’ Union of Azerbaijan and the Bishkek Pen.

He is the Secretary for International Relations of the Azerbaijan Writers' Union, as well as the Chairman of the Admissions Committee.

Married, he has two children. He lives in Baku with his family.
