= Rustam Dastanoglu =

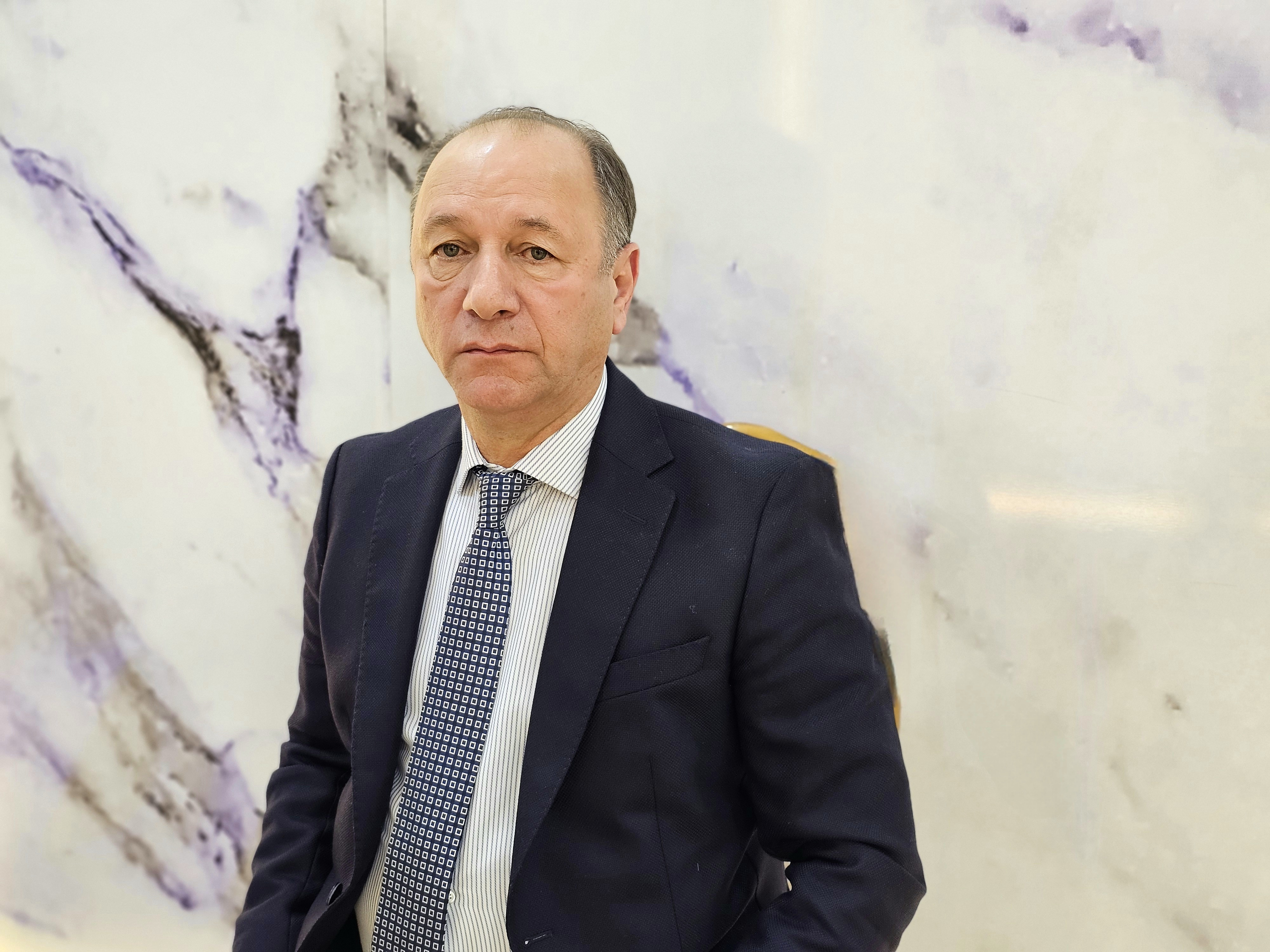
- Born: November 16, 1960 (age 65); Ayrk, Vardenis District, Armenian Soviet Socialist Republic, Soviet Union
- Citizenship: Azerbaijan
- Education: Kyiv Polytechnic Institute
- Children: 4
- Writing career
- Language: Azerbaijani
- Period: 1980s
- Notable awards: "Ashig Alasgar - 200" jubilee medal, Vagif Samadoghlu Medal

Rustam Dastanoglu (Azerbaijani: Rüstəm Dastan oğlu Məmmədov; November 16, 1960, Ayrk, Gegharkunik Province) is an Azerbaijani writer-publicist. Member of the Azerbaijan Writers' Union and laureate of the Vagif Samadoghlu Medal.

== Biography ==
Rustam Dastanoglu was born on November 16, 1960, in the village of Dashkend, Basarkechar district. After studying at the Dashkend village high school from 1967 to 1975, he continued his education at the chemistry-biology boarding school No. 5 in Baku city and finished that school in 1977.

In 1978, he was admitted to the Kyiv Polytechnic Institute in Ukraine, majoring in atomic physics, and graduated from the same institute in 1984.

In 1985–1987, he worked as an engineer at "Azerenergy" OJSC, and in 1987–1991, he worked as a department head and deputy head of the department at Yeni-Baku Construction and Installation Department of the Azerenergy Construction and Installation State Company.

He is married and has four children.

== Creativity ==
Rustam Dastanoglu's journalistic articles, stories and writings on economics have been published in the press since the 1980s.

He is the author of the book "Dashkend and Dashkendliler", published in 2012. The book provides extensive information about the population, history, toponyms and geographical location of the village of Dashkend in the Goycha district. On October 17, 2013, a program about the book was broadcast on the "Gobustan" program of Medeniyyet TV. Professor Ibrahim Bayramov expressed positive opinions about the book in the program.

In December 2022, the book "Dushunjelerimin kolgesi" ("The Shadow of My Thoughts") was published by Qanun Publishing House. The book consists of 216 pages. The book contains the author's stories, essays, journalistic articles, interviews and other creative examples. The author of the foreword to the book is Orkhan Fikratoglu, the editor is Araz Yaguboglu, and the proofreader is Asifa Afandiyeva. On February 4, 2023, a presentation ceremony of the book was held at the Central Scientific Library of ANAS. Critics-literary scholars Asad Jahangir and Yashar Aliyev gave an extensive report about the book.

The stories "Tenhalig hesreti" ("Longing for Loneliness"), "Torpaghin ruhu" ("Spirit of the Land"), and "Yol" ("Road") published in the book once aroused great interest among Azerbaijani readers. In particular, the story "Tenhalig hesreti" ("Longing for Loneliness") was published in the magazine "Ulduz" in 1989 and won the sympathy of thousands of readers.

== Public activity ==
In 1992–1994 — in the first years of our independence, he organized the participation of Azerbaijani cultural representatives in international festivals held in Turkey.

He worked as a commercial director at the "Yeni Film" company.

With the support of Rustam Dastanoglu, a film about Ashig Haji Goychali was made on Azerbaijan Television in June 2011, and the film was broadcast on the "Yurd yeri" program.

Rustam Dastanoglu is the author of the idea for the full-length documentary film "Donush" about the military doctor of the Karabakh war Imran Gurbanov, based on the script of Orkhan Fikratoglu and directed by Rufat Asadov in 2018.

In 2021, with the sponsorship and idea authorship of Rustam Dastanoglu, Ashig Alasgar's book "Sozun ishighi" ("The Light of the Word") was published in Georgian. The book was published as a contribution to the events marking the 200th anniversary of Ashig Alasgar. On August 6, 2021, the book was presented at the Azerbaijan Writers' Union.

In 2022, he sponsored the textbook "Rheumatology" for students of the Azerbaijan Medical University.

The "Dastanoglu Foundation", founded by Rustam Dastanoglu, organizes a prose competition named after Yusif Samadoglu every year, and the winners who take the first three places are awarded by the foundation.

He is a member of the Azerbaijan Writers' Union.

== Awards ==
On March 5, 2022, he was awarded the "Ashig Alasgar - 200" jubilee medal.

On January 28, 2025, he was awarded the Vagif Samadoghlu Medal.
