= Vagif Samadoghlu =

- Vaqif Səmədoğlu
- Born: Vaqif Səməd oğlu Vəkilov; June 5, 1939; Baku, Azerbaijan SSR, USSR
- Died: January 28, 2015 (aged 75); Baku, Azerbaijan
- Resting place: Alley of Honor
- Citizenship: USSR; Azerbaijan
- Education: National Conservatory of Azerbaijan
- Occupation: writer
- Relatives: Samad Vurgun (father); Yusif Samadoghlu (brother)
- Writing career
- Notable awards

Vagif Samadoghlu (Azerbaijani: Vaqif Səmədoğlu, 5 June 1939 – 28 January 2015) was an Azerbaijani poet, playwright, publicist, People's Poet of the Republic of Azerbaijan, and Deputy of the National Assembly of the Republic of Azerbaijan.

== Biography ==
Vagif Samadoghlu was born on 5 June 1939 in Baku. After Vakilov graduated from the Music School named after Bulbul, he studied at the National Conservatory of Azerbaijan. Passed a professional course at the Moscow Conservatory named after Tchaikovsky (1962–1963).

He has worked as the chief of the art editorial office of the Azerbaijani Soviet Encyclopedia (1968–1971) and editor-in-chief of the Oghuz Eli newspaper (1992–1994). Vakilov then worked as a piano teacher at the National Conservatory of Azerbaijan (1963–1971) and as the literary director of the movie-actor theater at the Azerbaijanfilm studio named after J. Jabbarly (1982–1985).

Vagif Samadoghlu was elected as a deputy to the National Assembly of the Republic of Azerbaijan in 2000 and 2005. He was a member of the delegation of Azerbaijan to the Council of Europe (2000–2005). He had been a member of the Union of Azerbaijani Writers since 1970.

The poet died on January 28, 2015, and was buried in the Alley of Honor.

== Works ==
Vakilov also worked in the field of poetry, theater and drama. The first press work, named "Seven Poems", was published in 1963 in the journal "Azerbaijan". He started to artistic creativity in the 60's. The first book, "Telegrams on the Road," was published in 1968. Later, "The Happiness of the Day", "Here I am, Divine", and "Far, Green Island" were published.

He was also a talented playwright. The plays High Mountain, Lottery, Happiness ring, Summer snowball game, Man with green glasses, General's last command, and Mamoy men's dreams were staged, and some of them have achieved great success in feature films and television productions.

== Family ==
Yusif agha Vakilov	Mahbub khanım Vakilova
Rugiyya; Pashabayova	Mehdikhan; Vakilov	Samad; Vakilov	Khavar; Vakilova
Chichak; Vakilova	Javanshir; Vakilov	Yusif; Vakilov	Vagif; Vakilov	Aybaniz; Vakilova

== Awards ==
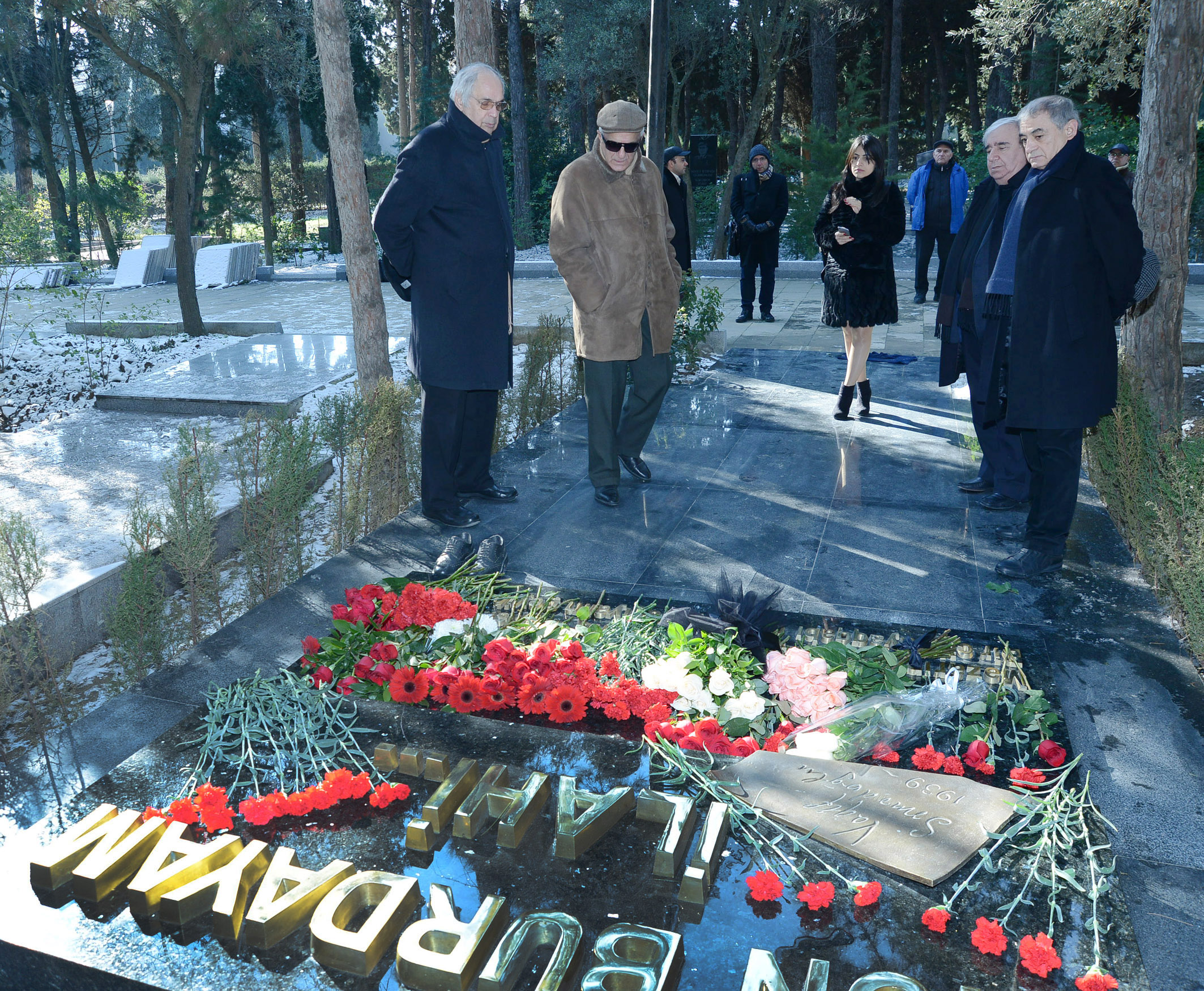
Grave of Vagif Samadoghlu

- Honored Art Worker of the Azerbaijan SSR — 21 March 1989
- Humay Award — 1998
- People's Poet of the Republic of Azerbaijan – 9 December 1999
- Presidential Pension of Azerbaijan – 2 October 2002
- Shohrat Order — 5 June 2004
- Sharaf Order — 4 June 2009
- Istiglal Order — 2 June 2014
- Nasimi Award – 2014
