= Bashir Safaroglu =

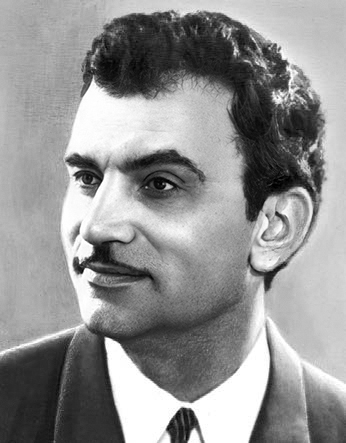
Bashir Safaroglu (1925-1969)

Bashir Safaroglu Safaroglu (Azerbaijan: Bəşir Səfəroğlu, 1925–1969) was an Azerbaijani Soviet theater and film actor. He was part of the Azerbaijan Musical Comedy Theater, People's Artist of Azerbaijan SSR (1968). He was the father of People's Artist of Azerbaijan Afag Bashirgyzy.

== Early life ==
Safaroglu was born on 11 March 1925 in Rustov, Quba District. His nationality is Tat people. He grew up in a poor family. He lost his father early, and his grandmother raised him and his siblings. His stage debut took place in early childhood at the Abilov Culture Center, where his grandmother worked as a dressmaker. At age nine he played the role of Gunduz in the amateur performance Sevil by Jafar Jabbarli. He visited the theatrical circle of Agaali Dadashev.

== Career ==
In 1941, the Great Patriotic War began and Bashir Safaroglu went to the battle front. A year later he got a concussion. Thereafter he could not speak and could not hear well. For some time he worked as a driver, and enrolled in the drama club of the Club of Drivers. He continued to visit the circle of Agali Dadashev. In the Club of Drivers Safaroglu met comedian/actor Lutfali Abdullayev, who invited him to the Theater of Musical Comedy. On the advice of the director Niyaz Sharifov, he often visited theaters, and after a while was admitted to the theater troupe. Sofarov became very excited during sleep, and then began to talk, and he became an actor. In addition to roles in the theater, he starred in films, shot by Azerbaijanfilm such as Where is Ahmed? As an alcoholic, Ulduz in the role of Gyulyussarov and in the film by Tajikfilm 12 tombs of Khoja Nasreddin.

In the mid-1960s, the miniature theater "Gelmeli, Gormeli, Gulmeli" was created in the Azerbaijan State Philharmonic. The members of this theater were People's Artist Aliagha Agayev, Honored Artist Mukhlis Janizade, Ophelia Abbasova and Bashir Safaroglu. In this collective Bashir created satirical roles. In 1963, when the theater of musical comedy of Azerbaijan toured in Moscow, Arkady Raikin saw the performance of Bashir Safar-ogly and called it "Southern Chaplin".

== Recognition ==
In 1964, the actor was awarded the title of Honored Artist of Azerbaijan, in 1968 - he was awarded the title of People's Artist. A year later, on March 23, at the age of 44, Bashir Safaroglu died. He was buried in the Alley of Honor in Baku.

Rauf Kazimovski produced a documentary film dedicated to Bashir Safaroglu. Safaroglu's daughter, People's Artist of Azerbaijan Afag Bashirgizi is the artistic director of the show Bashir, named after her father. In 2002, a Theater named after Bashir Safaroglu opened in Moscow. In 2004, on the stage of the Moscow State Theater of Satire, the first premiere of the show Bashir Safaroglu.

== Filmography ==
- 1960 - Aygun - collective farmer
- 1961 - Strange story - Jamil
- 1963 - Where is Ahmed? - Drunk Ahmed
- 1964 - Ulduz (Star) - Professor Gyulumsarov
- 1965 - Woolen shawl
- 1966 - 12 tombs of Khoja Nasreddin - Khoja Nasreddin (duplicated by E. Vesnik)
- 1966 - Life is a good thing, brother! - Zia
