= Ali Valiyev =

Ali Valiyev (27 February 1901 – 2 February 1983) was a prose-writer, the member of Union of Azerbaijani Writers, Azerbaijan People's Writer (June 9, 1974), the State reward prize-winner named after M. F. Akhundov.

== Biography ==
He studied in Shusha Public School (1923), Baku Central Public Council School (1924–25) and lecturers group. He entered to the history and community faculty of Azerbaijan State Pedagogical Institute in 1928. His stories have been published in "Revolution and culture", "Assault", "In the literature front" and other newspapers and magazines. In 1930 he was appointed chief of the publicity and agitation department of Aghdam region party committee and editor of "Kolxoz sədası" newspaper. He has worked actively on party field in Lachin, Gubadli regions and Naxchivan province, at the same time he was responsible editor of "East door" and "Soviet Kurdustan" newspapers until 1937. In 1942-43 he worked in chargeable positions in Azerbaijan Art Workers Union, Baku region Executive Committee. Additionally, he worked as deputy editor and liable editor in "Communist" newspaper. For a time he worked as responsible secretary in Writers Union and as chargeable editor in "Azerbaijan" magazine and he engaged with literature till the end of his life.

== Creativity ==
He is one of outstanding figures of the Azerbaijani national literature. In his works he tried to reflect the public mood of the Azerbaijani village. In creativity of A. Valiyev that knows people's lives better the local color was reflected with all its richness. He is the author of "Travel of God", "Grandmother's spinning-wheel", "Snowy mountains", "Friends", "Evidence", "Gulshan", "Flowery", "Friends of heart", "Anaqiz", "A pair of star", "A pair of peregrine", "Tea-urn smokes", "Crane range", "Stars of time", "Worried mAn", "Past days", "Madar's epos" books. He died in 1983.

== Selected works ==
- Allahın səyahəti (Travel of God)1930
- Nənəmin cəhrəsi (Grandmother's spinning-wheel)1930
- Qarlı dağlar (Snowy mountains)1938
- Dostlar (Friends)1939
- Ordenli çoban (Shepherd with order)1939
- Qəhrəman (Hero)1940
- Sübut (Evidence)1941
- Cəbhə hekayələri (The front stories)1942
- Gülşən (Gulshan)1953
- Çiçəkli (Flowery)1955
- Turaclıya gedən yol (The way gone to Turajli)1961
- Anaqiz 1965
- Bir cüt ulduz (A pair of star)1967
- Bir cüt tərlan (A pair of peregrine)1968
- Seçilmiş əsərləri (Selected works) 6 volumes, Baku, Azərnəşr-1968, 12,000 copies
- Seçilmiş əsərləri (Selected works) stories, novels 6 volumes, Azerbaijan State Book House-1969.12 000 copies
- Gülşən və ürək dostları (Gulshan and her close friends)1970
- Ürək dostları (Close friends)1970
- Samovar tüstülənir (Tea-urn smokes)1971
- Durna qatarı (Crane range)1972
- Budağın xatirələri (Budag's memories)1974
- Zamanın ulduzları (Stars of time)1976
- Narahat adam (Worried man)1978
- Oçerklər (Essays)1978
- Ötən günlər (Past days)1981
- Madarın dastanı (Madar's epos)1988
