= Chingiz Abdullayev =

Azerbaijani writer (born 1959)

- Born: Chingiz Akif oglu Abdullayev; 7 April 1959 (age 67); Baku, Azerbaijan SSR, Soviet Union
- Occupation: Writer
- Writing career
- Language: Azerbaijani, Russian
- Period: 1988–present
- Genre: Detective fiction

Chingiz Akif oğlu Abdullayev (Azerbaijani: Çingiz Abdullayev; born 7 April 1959 in Baku) is an Azerbaijani writer, Secretary of the Union of Azerbaijani Writers.

== Early life ==
Originating from a family of intellectuals with roots in the Agdam region of Karabakh, Chingiz Abdullayev embarked on his educational journey at Baku School No. 189, concluding in 1976. Following this, Abdullayev engaged in advanced studies at the Law Faculty of Azerbaijan State University, culminating in his graduation in 1981. In the ensuing period, he secured a position at a production association located in Baku, ascending through the hierarchical structure to attain the roles of senior counselor and department head.

Throughout his career, Abdullayev partook in business expeditions spanning Asia, Africa, and Europe. Within his native city of Baku, he fulfilled various roles, including serving as the department head in the Executive Committee of the Azizbeyov district, as an instructor for the organizational department of the Karadag Committee of the Communist Party of the Azerbaijan SSR, and subsequently, as the head of the office of political education.

In the realm of academia, Abdullayev has made noteworthy contributions, defending a master’s thesis focused on aggression within international law, followed by a doctoral thesis in 1991 centered on crimes within the same legal sphere. Among his academic accolades, he has been honored with the title of honorary professor at the University of Krakow since 1989. Beyond his academic endeavors, Abdullayev has occupied several distinguished positions, such as the chairman of the H. Z. Taghiyev Charity Foundation since 1990, secretary of the Writers' Union of Azerbaijan, and vice-president of the Pen Club in Azerbaijan.

Demonstrating linguistic adeptness, Abdullayev is fluent in Azerbaijani and Russian and exhibits proficiency in English and Italian.

== Early career ==
Abdullayev wrote his first novel in 1985. It was barred from publication because of the secrets it revealed, but by 1988 the Soviet censorship was relaxed, and his book was published.

== Popularity ==
He is known mostly for his detective novels, which became extremely popular throughout the former Soviet Union and continue to attract readers not only in the CIS countries but also throughout the world.

Abdullayev has been published more than any other Azerbaijani writer. His books sold more than 20 million copies—mostly in the genre of detective novels and short stories in the Russian language.

He has authored more than 86 works, including novels and short stories, which have been published in 17 languages in 23 countries throughout the world. including the countries of the former Soviet Union, France, Israel, Sweden, Norway, Turkey, and Bulgaria. His detective novels that are listed in The Golden Fund of World Detective Literature include Blue Angels, The Law of Scoundrels, Better to Be Holy, The Shadow of Herod, and Three Colors of Blood.

== Philanthropy ==
Chingiz Abdullayev refuses to earn any money from speeches or lectures in Azerbaijan, preferring instead to donate any money he could earn here to refugees who can't go home because of the Nagorno-Karabakh conflict. In 2012, he has campaigned to stop male violence against women.

== Honours and awards ==
- Order of the Red Star
- Order of the Red Banner of Labour
- Order of the Red Banner
- Medal "For Labour Valour"
- Medal "For Courage"
- Shohrat Order

== Family ==
Married, has one son and daughter.

== Bibliography ==
=== in Azerbaijani ===
- Чинҝиз Абдуллајев. Мави мәләкләр: Роман. – Бакы: Јазычы, 1993. – 256 с. – 9 000 экз.
- Чинҝиз Абдуллајев. Әҹлафларын гануну: Роман. – Бакы: Заман, 1997. – 304 с. – 500 экз.
- Чинҝиз Абдуллајев. Мәһкумларын ҹәннәти: Повест. – Бакы, 1997.
- Çingiz Abdullayev. Günəş altında zülmət: Roman // Журнал "Mütərcim". – Bakı, 1999–2000. – No. 2, 4; 1, 2. – ISSN 2073-9249.
- Чинҝиз Абдуллајев. Ганын үч рәнҝи: Роман. – Бакы: Азәрбајҹан, 2001. – 352 с. – 3 000 экз.
- Çingiz Abdullayev. Allahın tərəfində: Roman. – Bakı: Çıraq, 2003. – 160 с. – 500 экз.
- Çingiz Abdullayev. Müqəddəs olmaq istəyi: Roman. — Bakı: Adiloğlu, 2004. — 278 с. — 1 000 экз.
- Çingiz Abdullayev. Bir ümman nifrət: Povest. — Bakı: Çıraq, 2004. — 144 с. — 500 экз.
- Çingiz Abdullayev. Alçağın üslubu: Roman. — Bakı: Çıraq, 2005. — 240 с. — 500 экз.
- Çingiz Abdullayev. Məhşər ayağında: Roman. — Bakı: Çıraq, 2005. — Т. I. — 200 с. — 500 экз.
- Çingiz Abdullayev. Məhşər ayağında: Roman. — Bakı: Çıraq, 2005. — Т. II. — 184 с. — 500 экз.
- Çingiz Abdullayev. Payız madriqalı: Roman. — Bakı: Yurd, 2005. — 152 с. — 200 экз.
- Çingiz Abdullayev. Monte-Mario təpəsində ölüm: Roman. — Bakı: Çıraq, 2005. — 160 с. — 500 экз.
- Çingiz Abdullayev. Mənim gözəl alibim: Roman. — Bakı: Nurlan, 2006. — 166 с. — 300 экз.
- Çingiz Abdullayev. Bağdadlı əlaqələndirici: Roman. — Bakı: Çıraq, 2006. — 216 с. — 500 экз.
- Çingiz Abdullayev. Unudulmuş röya: Roman. — Bakı: Çıraq, 2006. — 216 с. — 500 экз.
- Çingiz Abdullayev. Yalnız özümüzünkülər: Roman. — Bakı: Çıraq, 2007. — 206 с. — 500 экз.
- Çingiz Abdullayev. Pəri busəsi: Povest. — Bakı: Nağıl evi, 2007. — 72 с. — 500 экз.
- Çingiz Abdullayev. Qatil üçün Qran-pri: Roman. — Bakı: Kitab Klubu, 2007. — 304 с. — 300 экз. — ISBN 978-9952-8087-3-5
- Çingiz Abdullayev. Üçüncü variant: Roman. — Bakı: Nurlan, 2007. — 272 с. — 900 экз.
- Çingiz Abdullayev. Döyüşçünün yolu: Roman. — Bakı: Çıraq, 2007. — 304 с. — 500 экз.
- Çingiz Abdullayev. Gedib qayıtmamaq: Roman // Журнал "Mütərcim". — Bakı, 2007. — No. 1/2 (34–35); 1 (36). — ISSN 2073-9249.
- Çingiz Abdullayev. Manyakın idrakı: Roman. — Bakı: UniPrint, 2008. — 200 с. — 200 экз. — ISBN 978-9952-440-31-7
- Çingiz Abdullayev. Gedər-gəlməz: Roman. — Bakı: Nurlan, 2008. — 359 с. — 500 экз.
- Çingiz Abdullayev. Quba kapriççiosu: Roman. — Bakı: Nurlar NPM, 2008. — 224 с. — 2 000 экз. — ISBN 978-9952-450-01-9
- Çingiz Abdullayev. Qisasın ölçüsü: Roman. — Bakı: Çıraq, 2008. — 320 с. — 500 экз.
- Çingiz Abdullayev. Payız madriqalı: Roman. — Bakı: Nurlar NPM, 2009. — 200 с. — 2 000 экз. — ISBN 978-9952-450-02-6
- Çingiz Abdullayev. Məhəbbət və nifrətin zirvəsi: Roman. — Bakı: Çıraq, 2009. — 240 с. — 500 экз.
- Çingiz Abdullayev. Etiraflar vadisi: Roman. — Bakı: Çıraq, 2009. — 280 с. — 500 экз.
- Çingiz Abdullayev. Xammurapi məcəlləsi: Roman. — Bakı: UniPrint, 2009. — 204 с. — 800 экз. — ISBN 978-9952-440-45-4
- Çingiz Abdullayev. Centlmen sövdələşməsi: Roman. — Bakı: Çıraq, 2009. — 352 с. — 500 экз.
- Çingiz Abdullayev. Manipulyator. Üç payız günü: Roman. — Bakı: UniPrint, 2009. — 180 с. — 2 000 экз. — ISBN 978-9952-440-46-1
- Çingiz Abdullayev. Göy mələklər: Roman. — Bakı: Çıraq, 2009. — 328 с. — 500 экз.
- Çingiz Abdullayev. Etiraflar vadisi: Roman. — Bakı: Mütərcim, 2010. — 48 с. — 1 000 экз.
- Çingiz Abdullayev. Saturnun tövbəsi: Roman. — Bakı: Nurlar, 2010. — 216 с. — 1 000 экз.
- Çingiz Abdullayev. Əfsanəyə çevrilmə haqqı: Roman. — Bakı: Xatun Plyus, 2010. — 172 с. — 1 000 экз. — ISBN 978-9952-210-44-6
- Çingiz Abdullayev. İrodun kölgəsi: Roman. — Bakı: UniPrint, 2010. — 214 с. — The ISBN specified even on http://www.elibrary.az/ (978-9952-440-09-7) is bad, causing a checksum error.
- Çingiz Abdullayev. Bir toy əhvalatı: Hekayə // Газета "Kaspi-Ədəbiyyat". – Bakı, 2010. – No. 29. – С. 15, 21.
- Çingiz Abdullayev. Sonuncu divarın daşları: Roman. – Bakı: Nurlar, 2010. – 272 с. – 1 000 экз. – ISBN 978-9952-450-97-2
- Çingiz Abdullayev. Aşkar metamorfoza: Povest. — Bakı: UniPrint, 2010. — 118 с. — 300 экз.
- Çingiz Abdullayev. Meymun ili: Roman. — Bakı: UniPrint, 2011. — 180 с. — ISBN 978-9952-440-04-1
- Çingiz Abdullayev. Manipulyator. Plutokratlar: Roman. — Bakı: UniPrint, 2011. — ISBN 978-5-17-053270-4
- Çingiz Abdullayev. İnsan ovu: Roman. — Bakı: "Zərdabi LTD", 2011. — 168 с. — 1 000 экз.
- Çingiz Abdullayev. Milad bayramında açılan atəş: Roman. — Bakı: "Zərdabi LTD", 2011. — 184 с. — 1 000 экз.
- Çingiz Abdullayev. Mavi mələklər: Roman. — Bakı: Qanun; Əli və Nino, 2011. — 344 с. — 2 000 экз. — ISBN 978-9952-26-175-2
- Çingiz Abdullayev. İnsan ovu: Roman. — Bakı: Qanun; Əli və Nino, 2011. — 280 с. — 2 000 экз. — ISBN 978-9952-26-189-9
- Çingiz Abdullayev. İngilis bulvarı: Roman. — Bakı: Qanun; Əli və Nino, 2011. — 208 с. — 2 000 экз. — ISBN 978-9952-26-204-9
- Çingiz Abdullayev. Ölümü özün seç: Roman. — Bakı: Qanun; Əli və Nino, 2011. — 288 с. — 2 000 экз. — ISBN 978-9952-26-215-5
- Çingiz Abdullayev. Bakı bulvarı: Roman. — Bakı: Qanun; Əli və Nino, 2011. — 248 с. — 2 000 экз. — ISBN 978-9952-26-216-2
- Çingiz Abdullayev. Abırlı adam: Roman. — Bakı: Qanun; Əli və Nino, 2011. — 280 с. — 2 000 экз. — ISBN 978-9952-26-239-1
- Çingiz Abdullayev. Tver bulvarı: Roman. — Bakı: Qanun; Əli və Nino, 2011. — 264 с. — 2 000 экз. — ISBN 978-9952-26-240-7
- Çingiz Abdullayev. Timsah xətti: Roman. Milyardın dəyəri: Povest. — Bakı: Qanun; Əli və Nino, 2012. — 312 с. — 2 000 экз. — ISBN 978-9952-26-248-3
- Çingiz Abdullayev. Məntiq qaydaları: Roman. — Bakı: Qanun; Əli və Nino, 2012. — 176 с. — 2 000 экз. — ISBN 978-9952-26-249-0
- Çingiz Abdullayev. Dərdimə şərik ol: Roman. — Bakı: Qanun; Əli və Nino, 2012. — 400 с. — 2 000 экз. — ISBN 978-9952-26-272-8
- Çingiz Abdullayev. Hammurapi qanunu: Roman. — Bakı: Qanun; Əli və Nino, 2012. — 296 с. — 2 000 экз. — ISBN 978-9952-26-274-2
- Çingiz Abdullayev. Andorra sevməli və ölməli yerdir: Povest. Peşəkarların qaydası: Roman. — Bakı: Qanun; Əli və Nino, 2012. — 272 с. — 2 000 экз. — ISBN 978-9952-26-275-9
- Çingiz Abdullayev. Xəzinadar: Roman. — Bakı: Qanun; Əli və Nino, 2012. — 264 с. — 2 000 экз. — ISBN 978-9952-26-307-7
- Çingiz Abdullayev. Prezident ovu: Roman. — Bakı: Qanun; Əli və Nino, 2012. — 264 с. — 2 000 экз. — ISBN 978-9952-26-308-4
- Çingiz Abdullayev. Yekun diaqnoz: Roman. — Bakı: Qanun; Əli və Nino, 2012. — 240 с. — 2 000 экз. — ISBN 978-9952-26-330-5
- Çingiz Abdullayev. Mənim gözəl alibim: Roman. — Bakı: Qanun; Əli və Nino, 2012. — 184 с. — 2 000 экз.
- Çingiz Abdullayev. Sutenyorun qəlbi: Roman. — Bakı: "Zərdabi LTD", 2012. — 168 с. — 1 000 экз.

=== in Russian ===
- Чингиз Абдуллаев. Голубые ангелы: Роман. — Баку: Язычы, 1988. — 256 с. — 30 000 экз. — ISBN 5-560-00131-7
- Чингиз Абдуллаев. Почти невероятное убийство: Повесть. // Журнал "Литературный Азербайджан". — Баку, 1989. — No. 2, 3. — ISSN 0130-3643.
- Чингиз Абдуллаев. Голубые ангелы: Роман. Почти невероятное убийство: Повесть. — Баку: Язычы, 1989. — 352 с. — 100 000 экз.
- Чингиз Абдуллаев. Преступление в Монпелье: Повесть. — Баку: Гянджлик, 1989. — 31 с. — 105 000 экз. — ISBN 5-8020-0489-4
- Чингиз Абдуллаев. Охота на человека: Роман. // Араз: Роман-газета. — Баку: Азернешр, 1990. — No. 1, 2.
- Черный январь. Баку – 1990: Документы и материалы. / Ответственные за выпуск: Чингиз Абдуллаев, Ибрагим Шукюров . — Баку: Азернешр, 1990. — 288 с. — 50 000 экз. — ISBN 5-552-00716-6
- Чингиз Абдуллаев. Заговор в начале эры: Роман. Часть первая // Журнал "Литературный Азербайджан". — Баку, 1990. — No. 4, 5, 6. — ISSN 0130-3643.
- Чингиз Абдуллаев. Охота на человека: Роман. — Баку: Гянджлик, 1991. — 192 с. — 100 000 экз. — ISBN 5-8020-0678-1
- Чингиз Абдуллаев. Голубые ангелы: Роман. Почти невероятное убийство: Повесть. Охота на человека: Роман. — Баку: Язычы, 1992. — 592 с. — 20 000 экз. — ISBN 5-560-00873-7
- Чингиз Абдуллаев. Заговор в начале эры: Роман. Часть вторая. // Журнал "Литературный Азербайджан". — Баку, 1993. — No. 3–4, 5–6, 7–8. — ISSN 0130-3643.
- Чингиз Абдуллаев. Игры профессионалов: Роман. В ожидании Апокалипсиса: Роман. — Краснодар: "Советская Кубань", 1994. — 352 с. — 100 000 экз. — ISBN 5-7221-0046-3
- Чингиз Абдуллаев. Лучше быть святым: Роман. Охота на человека: Роман. Правило профессионалов: Роман. — Ростов-на-Дону: Проф-Пресс, 1994. — 512 с. — 25 000 экз. — ISBN 5-88475-010-2
- Чингиз Абдуллаев. Игры профессионалов: Роман. В ожидании Апокалипсиса: Роман. Выбери себе смерть: Роман. — Ростов-на-Дону: Проф-Пресс, 1995. — 544 с. — 25 000 экз. — ISBN 5-88475-017-X
- Чингиз Абдуллаев. Игры профессионалов: Роман. В ожидании Апокалипсиса: Роман. Правила логики профессионалов: Повесть. — Москва: Эксмо, 1995. — 480 с. — 60 000 экз. — ISBN 5-85585-177-X
- Чингиз Абдуллаев. Уйти и не вернуться: Роман. Мое прекрасное алиби: Роман. — Ростов-на-Дону: Проф-Пресс, 1995. — 480 с. — 100 000 экз. — ISBN 5-88475-024-2
- Чингиз Абдуллаев. Заговор в начале эры: Роман. — Ростов-на-Дону: Проф-Пресс, 1995. — 480 с. — 25 000 экз. — ISBN 5-88475-025-0
- Чингиз Абдуллаев. Закон негодяев: Роман. Правила логики: Рассказы. — Ростов-на-Дону: Проф-Пресс, 1995. — 448 с. — 75 000 экз. — ISBN 5-88475-034-X
- Чингиз Абдуллаев. Кредо негодяев: Роман. Любить и умирать только в Андорре: Повесть. — Ростов-на-Дону: Проф-Пресс, 1995. — 448 с. — 75 000 экз. — ISBN 5-88475-053-6
- Чингиз Абдуллаев. Мрак под солнцем: Роман. — Ростов-на-Дону: Проф-Пресс, 1995. — 416 с. — 100 000 экз. — ISBN 5-88475-038-2
- Чингиз Абдуллаев. Совесть негодяев: Роман. — Ростов-на-Дону: Проф-Пресс, 1995. — 416 с. — 100 000 экз. — ISBN 5-88475-059-5
- Чингиз Абдуллаев. Пройти чистилище: Роман. — Ростов-на-Дону: Проф-Пресс, 1996. — 416 с. — 100 000 экз. — ISBN 5-88475-002-1
- Чингиз Абдуллаев. Зло в имени твоём, женщина: Роман. Сотвори себе мир: Роман. — Ростов-на-Дону: Проф-Пресс, 1996. — 416 с. — 50 000 экз. — ISBN 5-88475-066-8
- Чингиз Абдуллаев. Обретение ада: Роман. — Ростов-на-Дону: Проф-Пресс, 1996. — 416 с. — 50 000 экз. — ISBN 5-88475-100-1
- Чингиз Абдуллаев. Измена в имени твоём, женщина: Роман. Месть женщины: Повесть. — Ростов-на-Дону: Проф-Пресс, 1996. — 384 с. — 40 000 экз. — ISBN 5-88475-099-4
- Чингиз Абдуллаев. Тень Ирода: Роман. Рай обречённых: Повесть. — Ростов-на-Дону: Проф-Пресс, 1996. — 416 с. — 40 000 экз. — ISBN 5-88475-108-7
- Чингиз Абдуллаев. Симфония тьмы: Роман. — Ростов-на-Дону: Проф-Пресс, 1996. — 409 с. — 40 000 экз. — ISBN 5-88475-110-9
- Чингиз Абдуллаев. Три цвета крови: Роман. — Ростов-на-Дону: Проф-Пресс, 1996. — 384 с. — 50 000 экз. — ISBN 5-88475-176-1
- Чингиз Абдуллаев. Третий вариант: Роман. Океан ненависти: Роман. — Ростов-на-Дону: Проф-Пресс, 1996. — 384 с. — 50 000 экз. — ISBN 5-88475-205-9
- Чингиз Абдуллаев. Линия аллигатора: Роман. Плата Харону: Повесть. — Ростов-на-Дону: Проф-Пресс, 1996. — 384 с. — 50 000 экз. — ISBN 5-88475-222-9
- Чингиз Абдуллаев. День Луны: Роман. — Москва: Эксмо, 1996. — 416 с. — 40 000 экз. — ISBN 5-85585-721-2
- Чингиз Абдуллаев. Круг негодяев: Трилогия. // Закон негодяев; Кредо негодяев; Совесть негодяев: Романы. — Ростов-на-Дону – Харьков: Проф-Пресс; ЕвроЭкспресс, 1996. — 640 с. — 200 000 экз. — ISBN 5-88475-062-5
- Чингиз Абдуллаев. Всегда вчерашнее завтра: Роман. Сколько стоит миллиард: Повесть. — Ростов-на-Дону: Проф-Пресс, 1997. — 448 с. — 40 000 экз. — ISBN 5-88475-253-9
- Чингиз Абдуллаев. Альтернатива для грешников: Роман. — Москва: Эксмо, 1997. — 400 с. — 40 000 экз. — ISBN 5-251-00122-3
- Чингиз Абдуллаев. Стандарт возмездия: Роман. — Москва: Эксмо, 1997. — 400 с. — 40 000 экз. — ISBN 5-251-00295-5
- Чингиз Абдуллаев. Зеркало вампиров: Роман. — Москва: Эксмо, 1997. — 464 с. — 50 000 экз. — ISBN 5-251-00464-8
- Чингиз Абдуллаев. Альтернатива для дураков: Роман. Альтернатива для грешников: Роман. — Москва: Эксмо, 1997. — 416 с. — 60 000 экз. — ISBN 5-251-00495-8
- Чингиз Абдуллаев. И возьми мою боль: Роман. — Москва: Эксмо, 1997. — 416 с. — 50 000 экз. — ISBN 5-251-00673-X
- Чингиз Абдуллаев. Сила инерции: Повесть. Стандарт возмездия: Роман. — Москва: Эксмо, 1997. — 448 с. — 60 000 экз. — ISBN 5-04-000101-0
- Чингиз Абдуллаев. «Гран-при» для убийцы: Роман. — Москва: Эксмо, 1998. — 432 с. — 60 000 экз. — ISBN 5-04-000371-4
- Чингиз Абдуллаев. Символы распада: Роман. — Москва: Эксмо, 1998. — 464 с. — 60 000 экз. — ISBN 5-04-000460-5
- Чингиз Абдуллаев. Пепел надежды: Роман. — Москва: Эксмо, 1998. — 464 с. — 60 000 экз. — ISBN 5-04-001036-2
- Чингиз Абдуллаев. И возьми мою боль: Роман. Поцелуй Феи: Повесть. — Москва: Эксмо, 1998. — 432 с. — 60 000 экз. — ISBN 5-04-001192-X
- Чингиз Абдуллаев. Стиль подлеца: Роман. Рассудок маньяка: Роман. — Москва: Эксмо, 1998. — 544 с. — 40 000 экз. — ISBN 5-04-001554-2
- Чингиз Абдуллаев. Срок приговорённых: Роман. — Москва: Эксмо, 1998. — 512 с. — 50 000 экз. — ISBN 5-04-001682-4
- Чингиз Абдуллаев. Символы распада: Роман. Осуждение истины: Повесть. — Москва: Эксмо, 1998. — 448 с. — 30 000 экз. — ISBN 5-04-001719-7
- Чингиз Абдуллаев. Бремя идолов: Роман. — Москва: Эксмо, 1998. — 400 с. — 50 000 экз. — ISBN 5-04-001949-1
- Чингиз Абдуллаев. День гнева: Роман. — Москва: Эксмо, 1999. — 512 с. — 50 000 экз. — ISBN 5-04-002330-8
- Чингиз Абдуллаев. Тоннель призраков: Повесть. Срок приговорённых: Роман. — Москва: Эксмо, 1999. — 464 с. — 40 000 экз. — ISBN 5-04-002474-6
- Чингиз Абдуллаев. Идеальная мишень: Роман. — Москва: Эксмо, 1999. — 496 с. — 40 100 экз. — ISBN 5-04-002948-9
- Чингиз Абдуллаев. Фактор страха: Роман. — Москва: Эксмо, 1999. — 400 с. — 40 000 экз. — ISBN 5-04-003027-4
- Чингиз Абдуллаев. Мудрость палача: Роман. — Москва: АСТ, 1999. — 432 с. — 25 000 экз. — ISBN 5-237-03927-8
- Чингиз Абдуллаев. Последний синклит: Роман. На стороне Бога: Роман. — Москва: АСТ, 2000. — 400 с. — 100 000 экз. — ISBN 5-237-04790-4
- Чингиз Абдуллаев. Дамы сохраняют неподвижность: Роман. — Москва: Эксмо, 2000. — 448 с. — 40 000 экз. — ISBN 5-04-004960-9
- Чингиз Абдуллаев. Упразднённый ритуал: Роман. Душа сутенёра: Роман. — Москва: АСТ, 2000. — 384 с. — 30 000 экз. — ISBN 5-17-002739-7
- Чингиз Абдуллаев. Рандеву с Валтасаром: Роман. — Москва: АСТ, 2000. — 384 с. — 20 000 экз. — ISBN 5-17-003998-0
- Чингиз Абдуллаев. Смерть на холме Монте-Марио: Роман. Самое надёжное: Роман. — Москва: АСТ, 2000. — 320 с. — 15 000 экз. — ISBN 5-17-005713-X
- Чингиз Абдуллаев. Путь воина: Роман. — Москва: Эксмо, 2001. — 384 с. — 40 100 экз. — ISBN 5-04-007413-1
- Чингиз Абдуллаев. Камни последней стены: Роман. — Москва: АСТ, 2001. — 320 с. — 15 000 экз. — ISBN 5-17-005047-X
- Чингиз Абдуллаев. Очевидная метаморфоза, или Один день из жизни Дениса Ивановича: Повесть. // Газета "Наш Век". — Баку, 2001. — No. 18–32.
- Чингиз Абдуллаев. Письмо другу: Рассказ. — Литературное расписание Европы: Сборник (По итогам международной акции «Литературный экспресс «Европа – 2000»). — Москва: Радуга, 2001. — С. 11–19. — 928 с. — 2 000 экз. — ISBN 5-05-005226-2
- Чингиз Абдуллаев. Опрокинутая реальность: Роман. — Москва: Эксмо, 2001. — 384 с. — 35 000 экз. — ISBN 5-04-008169-3
- Чингиз Абдуллаев. Исповедь Сатурна: Роман. — Москва: АСТ, 2001. — С. 320. — 10 000 экз. — ISBN 5-17-006608-2
- Чингиз Абдуллаев. Один раз в миллениум: Роман. — Москва: АСТ, 2001. — 316 с. — 10 000 экз. — ISBN 5-17-012175-X
- Чингиз Абдуллаев. Допустимая погрешность: Роман. — Москва: АСТ, 2001. — 283 с. — 25 000 экз. — ISBN 5-17-012289-6
- Чингиз Абдуллаев. Флирт в Севилье: Роман. — Москва: АСТ, 2002. — 283 с. — 20 000 экз. — ISBN 5-17-012959-9
- Чингиз Абдуллаев. Резонёр: Роман. — Москва: АСТ, 2002. — 320 с. — 10 000 экз. — ISBN 5-17-013242-5
- Чингиз Абдуллаев. Английский бульвар: Роман. // Журнал "Литературный Азербайджан". — Баку, 2002. — No. 2, 3. — ISSN 0130-3643.
- Чингиз Абдуллаев. Традиции самураев: Роман. Взгляд Горгоны: Повесть. — Москва: Эксмо, 2002. — 416 с. — 12 000 экз. — ISBN 5-04-010221-6
- Чингиз Абдуллаев. Окончательный диагноз: Роман. Смерть над Атлантикой: Рассказ. — Москва: АСТ, 2002. — 315 с. — 20 000 экз. — ISBN 5-17-014216-1
- Чингиз Абдуллаев. Крах лицедея: Роман. — Москва: АСТ, 2002. — 300 с. — 20 000 экз. — ISBN 5-17-015113-6
- Чингиз Абдуллаев. Осенний мадригал: Роман. — Москва: АСТ, 2002. — 300 с. — 20 000 экз. — ISBN 5-17-015426-7
- Чингиз Абдуллаев. Когда умирают слоны: Роман. — Москва: АСТ, 2002. — 320 с. — 15 000 экз. — ISBN 5-17-016835-7
- Чингиз Абдуллаев. Волшебный дар: Роман. — Москва: АСТ, 2003. — 320 с. — 20 000 экз. — ISBN 5-17-019387-4
- Чингиз Абдуллаев. Манипулятор: В 2 томах. — Москва: АСТ, 2003. — Т. 1. Три осенних дня: Роман. — 320 с. — 20 000 экз. — ISBN 5-17-020035-8
- Чингиз Абдуллаев. Манипулятор: В 2 томах. — Москва: АСТ, 2003. — Т. 2. Плутократы: Роман. — 320 с. — 20 000 экз. — ISBN 5-17-020437-X
- Чингиз Абдуллаев. Его апатия: Роман. — Москва: АСТ, 2003. — 320 с. — 10 000 экз. — ISBN 5-17-021017-5
- Чингиз Абдуллаев. Закат в Лиссабоне: Роман. — Москва: АСТ, 2003. — 320 с. — 10 000 экз. — ISBN 5-17-020694-1
- Чингиз Абдуллаев. Трибунал для Валенсии: Роман. — Москва: АСТ, 2003. — 304 с. — 10 000 экз. — ISBN 5-17-022683-7
- Чингиз Абдуллаев. Право на легенду: Роман. — Москва: АСТ, 2004. — 320 с. — 25 000 экз. — ISBN 5-17-027201-4
- Чингиз Абдуллаев. Ангел боли. Путешествие по Апеннинам: Роман. — Москва: АСТ, 2004. — 288 с. — 15 000 экз. — ISBN 5-17-027689-3
- Чингиз Абдуллаев. Ангел боли. Три четверти его души: Роман. — Москва: АСТ, 2004. — 288 с. — 10 000 экз. — ISBN 5-17-028737-2
- Чингиз Абдуллаев. Связной из Багдада: Роман. — Москва: АСТ, 2005. — 320 с. — 10 000 экз. — ISBN 5-17-029264-3
- Чингиз Абдуллаев. Свод Хаммурапи: Роман. — Москва: АСТ, 2005. — 320 с. — 10 000 экз. — ISBN 5-17-029907-9
- Чингиз Абдуллаев. Забытый сон: Роман. — Москва: АСТ, 2005. — 288 с. — 10 000 экз. — ISBN 5-17-030443-9
- Чингиз Абдуллаев. Только свои: Роман. — Москва: АСТ, 2005. — 288 с. — 10 000 экз. — ISBN 5-17-031220-2
- Чингиз Абдуллаев. История одной свадьбы: Рассказ. — История одной свадьбы: Антология прозы. — Баку: Нурлан, 2005. — 140 с. — 100 экз.
- Чингиз Абдуллаев. Покушение на власть. Субъект власти: Роман. — Москва: АСТ, 2005. — 320 с. — 5 000 экз. — ISBN 5-17-032238-0
- Чингиз Абдуллаев. Покушение на власть. Атрибут власти: Роман. — Москва: АСТ, 2005. — 304 с. — 4 000 экз. — ISBN 5-17-033552-0
- Чингиз Абдуллаев. Покушение на власть. Объект власти: Роман. — Москва: АСТ, 2005. — 320 с. — 10 000 экз. — ISBN 5-17-036036-3
- Чингиз Абдуллаев. Наследник олигарха: Роман. — Москва: Эксмо, 2006. — 320 с. — 10 000 экз. — ISBN 5-699-14863-9
- Чингиз Абдуллаев. Цена бесчестья: Роман. — Москва: Эксмо, 2006. — 320 с. — 14 100 экз. — ISBN 5-699-15315-2
- Чингиз Абдуллаев. Джентльменское соглашение: Роман. — Москва: Эксмо, 2006. — 320 с. — 17 000 экз. — ISBN 5-699-17946-1
- Чингиз Абдуллаев. Время нашего страха: Роман. — Москва: Эксмо, 2006. — 320 с. — 22 100 экз. — ISBN 5-699-18837-1
- Чингиз Абдуллаев. Хранители холода: Роман. — Москва: Эксмо, 2006. — 320 с. — 20 000 экз. — ISBN 5-699-19488-6
- Чингиз Абдуллаев. Западный зной: Роман. — Москва: Эксмо, 2006. — 288 с. — 22 100 экз.
- Чингиз Абдуллаев. Тверской бульвар: Роман. — Москва: АСТ, 2006. — 320 с. — 10 000 экз. — ISBN 978-5-17-042564-8
- Чингиз Абдуллаев. Казанова 2000: Рассказ. — Besame Mucho, или Карабахские пленники: Антология прозы и поэзии. — Баку: Нурлан, 2007. — 152 с. — 200 экз.
- Чингиз Абдуллаев. Завещание олигарха: Роман. — Москва: Эксмо, 2007. — 288 с. — 22 000 экз. — ISBN 978-5-699-20447-2
- Чингиз Абдуллаев. Мистерия эпохи заката: Роман. — Москва: АСТ, 2007. — 320 с. — 10 000 экз. — ISBN 978-5-17-043594-4
- Чингиз Абдуллаев. Власть маски: Роман. — Москва: Эксмо, 2007. — 320 с. — 25 000 экз. — ISBN 978-5-699-21463-1
- Чингиз Абдуллаев. Кубинское каприччио: Роман. — Москва: Эксмо, 2007. — 320 с. — 18 000 экз. — ISBN 978-5-699-22371-8
- Чингиз Абдуллаев. Тождественность любви и ненависти: Роман. — Москва: Эксмо, 2007. — 320 с. — 20 100 экз. — ISBN 978-5-699-23080-8
- Чингиз Абдуллаев. Восточный ветер: Роман. — Москва: Эксмо, 2007. — 320 с. — 18 000 экз. — ISBN 978-5-699-23792-0
- Чингиз Абдуллаев. Шпионы, не вернувшиеся с холода: Роман. — Москва: Эксмо, 2007. — 320 с. — 18 100 экз. — ISBN 978-5-699-24336-5
- Чингиз Абдуллаев. Этюд для Фрейда: Роман. — Москва: Эксмо, 2007. — 288 с. — 20 000 экз. — ISBN 978-5-699-24888-9
- Чингиз Абдуллаев. В поисках бафоса: Роман. // Газета "Биржа Плюс". — Баку, 2007–2008.
- Чингиз Абдуллаев. Долина откровений: Роман. — Москва: Эксмо, 2008. — 256 с. — 18 000 экз. — ISBN 978-5-699-25778-2
- Чингиз Абдуллаев. Покушение на власть: Трилогия. // Субъект власти; Атрибут власти; Объект власти: Романы. — Москва: АСТ, 2008. — 544 с. — 5 000 экз. — ISBN 978-5-17-051262-1
- Чингиз Абдуллаев. Отрицание Оккама: Роман. — Москва: Эксмо, 2008. — 320 с. — 18 100 экз. — ISBN 978-5-699-26001-0
- Чингиз Абдуллаев. Ошибка олигарха: Роман. — Москва: Эксмо, 2008. — 288 с. — 18 000 экз. — ISBN 978-5-699-28036-0
- Чингиз Абдуллаев. Возвращение олигарха: Роман. — Москва: Эксмо, 2008. — 320 с. — 18 100 экз. — ISBN 978-5-699-27332-4
- Чингиз Абдуллаев. Взращение грехов: Роман. — Москва: Эксмо, 2008. — 320 с. — 18 000 экз. — ISBN 978-5-699-28949-3
- Чингиз Абдуллаев. Выстрел на Рождество: Роман. — Москва: Эксмо, 2008. — 320 с. — 14 000 экз. — ISBN 978-5-699-30954-2
- Чингиз Абдуллаев. Год Обезьяны: Роман. — Москва: Эксмо, 2008. — 320 с. — 14 000 экз. — ISBN 978-5-699-31555-0
- Чингиз Абдуллаев. Апология здравого смысла: Роман. — Москва: Эксмо, 2008. — 320 с. — 13 100 экз. — ISBN 978-5-699-32210-7
- Чингиз Абдуллаев. Разорванная связь: Роман. // Журнал "Литературный Азербайджан". — Баку, 2008–2009. — No. 11, 12; 1. — ISSN 0130-3643.
- Чингиз Абдуллаев. Одноразовое использование: Роман. — Москва: Эксмо, 2009. — 320 с. — 14 000 экз. — ISBN 978-5-699-33221-2
- Чингиз Абдуллаев. Традиции демонов: Роман. — Москва: Эксмо, 2009. — 320 с. — 13 000 экз. — ISBN 978-5-699-33659-3
- Чингиз Абдуллаев. Мечта дилетантов: Роман. — Москва: Эксмо, 2009. — 320 с. — 13 100 экз. — ISBN 978-5-699-34340-9
- Чингиз Абдуллаев. Фестиваль для южного города: Роман. // Журнал "Литературный Азербайджан". — Баку, 2009. — No. 4, 5, 6, 7, 8. — ISSN 0130-3643.
- Чингиз Абдуллаев. Факир на все времена: Роман. — Москва: Эксмо, 2009. — 320 с. — 11 000 экз. — ISBN 978-5-699-34772-8
- Чингиз Абдуллаев. Казначей: Роман. — Москва: Эксмо, 2009. — 288 с. — 11 000 экз. — ISBN 978-5-699-35405-4
- Чингиз Абдуллаев. Хорошие парни не всегда бывают первыми: Роман. — Москва: Эксмо, 2009. — 320 с. — 11 000 экз. — ISBN 978-5-699-36113-7
- Чингиз Абдуллаев. Отравитель: Роман. — Москва: Эксмо, 2009. — 320 с. — 11 000 экз. — ISBN 978-5-699-36864-8
- Чингиз Абдуллаев. Фестиваль для южного города: Роман. — Москва: Эксмо, 2009. — 320 с. — 11 000 экз. — ISBN 978-5-699-37304-8
- Чингиз Абдуллаев. Среда обитания: Роман. — Москва: Эксмо, 2009. — 320 с. — 12 100 экз. — ISBN 978-5-699-37845-6
- Чингиз Абдуллаев. Второе рождение Венеры: Роман. — Москва: Эксмо, 2009. — 320 с. — 11 100 экз. — ISBN 978-5-699-38513-3
- Чингиз Абдуллаев. Полное каре: Роман. — Москва: Эксмо, 2009. — 320 с. — 11 100 экз. — ISBN 978-5-699-39159-2
- Чингиз Абдуллаев. Обозначенное присутствие: Роман. — Москва: Эксмо, 2010. — 320 с. — 12 000 экз. — ISBN 978-5-699-39779-2
- Чингиз Абдуллаев. Приличный человек: Роман. — Москва: Эксмо, 2010. — 320 с. — 12 100 экз. — ISBN 978-5-699-40295-3
- Чингиз Абдуллаев. Параллельное существование: Роман. — Москва: Эксмо, 2010. — 320 с. — 12 100 экз. — ISBN 978-5-699-40784-2
- Чингиз Абдуллаев. Агент из Кандагара: Роман. — Москва: Эксмо, 2010. — 320 с. — 11 000 экз. — ISBN 978-5-699-41111-5
- Чингиз Абдуллаев. Тайна венской ночи: Роман. — Москва: Эксмо, 2010. — 352 с. — 10 000 экз. — ISBN 978-5-699-42638-6
- Чингиз Абдуллаев. Город заблудших душ: Роман. — Москва: Эксмо, 2010. — 384 с. — 11 000 экз. — ISBN 978-5-699-43140-3
- Чингиз Абдуллаев. Дом одиноких сердец: Роман. — Москва: Эксмо, 2010. — 320 с. — 11 000 экз. — ISBN 978-5-699-43516-6
- Чингиз Абдуллаев. Берлинский транзит: Роман. — Москва: Эксмо, 2010. — 352 с. — 11 000 экз. — ISBN 978-5-699-44288-1
- Чингиз Абдуллаев. Алтарь победы: Роман. — Москва: Эксмо, 2010. — 320 с. — 10 000 экз. — ISBN 978-5-699-45072-5
- Чингиз Абдуллаев. Смерть под аплодисменты: Роман. — Москва: Эксмо, 2010. — 320 с. — 10 000 экз. — ISBN 978-5-699-45481-5
- Чингиз Абдуллаев. Затянувшееся послесловие: Роман. — Москва: Эксмо, 2010. — 320 с. — 10 000 экз. — ISBN 978-5-699-46127-1
- Чингиз Абдуллаев. Удар бумеранга: Роман. — Москва: Эксмо, 2011. — 272 с. — 9 000 экз. — ISBN 978-5-699-46945-1
- Чингиз Абдуллаев. Синдром жертвы: Роман. — Москва: Эксмо, 2011. — 352 с. — 10 100 экз. — ISBN 978-5-699-47214-7
- Чингиз Абдуллаев. Адаптация совести: Роман. — Москва: Эксмо, 2011. — 320 с. — 10 000 экз. — ISBN 978-5-699-47902-3
- Чингиз Абдуллаев. Бакинский бульвар: Роман. — Москва: Эксмо, 2011. — 320 с. — 10 000 экз. — ISBN 978-5-699-48376-1
- Чингиз Абдуллаев. Клан новых амазонок: Роман. — Москва: Эксмо, 2011. — 352 с. — 9 000 экз. — ISBN 978-5-699-49145-2
- Чингиз Абдуллаев. Поездка в Трансильванию: Роман. — Москва: Эксмо, 2011. — 352 с. — 10 100 экз. — ISBN 978-5-699-49785-0
- Чингиз Абдуллаев. Распад. Обреченная весна: Роман. — Москва: Эксмо, 2011. — 320 с. — 8 000 экз. — ISBN 978-5-699-50482-4
- Чингиз Абдуллаев. Распад. Лето двух президентов: Роман. — Москва: Эксмо, 2011. — 352 с. — 9 000 экз. — ISBN 978-5-699-50977-5
- Чингиз Абдуллаев. На грани фола: Роман. — Москва: Эксмо, 2011. — 352 с. — 9 000 экз. — ISBN 978-5-699-51610-0
- Чингиз Абдуллаев. Распад. Разорванный август: Роман. — Москва: Эксмо, 2011. — 352 с. — 10 000 экз. — ISBN 978-5-699-52450-1
- Чингиз Абдуллаев. Распад. Похороны империи: Роман. — Москва: Эксмо, 2011. — 352 с. — 10 000 экз. — ISBN 978-5-699-52994-0
- Чингиз Абдуллаев. Балканский синдром: Роман. — Москва: Эксмо, 2011. — 320 с. — 8 000 экз. — ISBN 978-5-699-53757-0
- Чингиз Абдуллаев. Повествование неудачника: Роман. — Москва: Эксмо, 2012. — 352 с. — 8 000 экз. — ISBN 978-5-699-54282-6
- Чингиз Абдуллаев. История безнравственности: Роман. — Москва: Эксмо, 2012. — 352 с. — 8 000 экз. — ISBN 978-5-699-54725-8
- Чингиз Абдуллаев. Распад. После заката: Роман. — Москва: Эксмо, 2012. — 320 с. — 8 000 экз. — ISBN 978-5-699-55258-0
- Чингиз Абдуллаев. Прайс-лист для издателя: Роман. — Москва: Эксмо, 2012. — 320 с. — 9 000 экз. — ISBN 978-5-699-55872-8
- Чингиз Абдуллаев. Рождение Люцифера: Роман. — Москва: Эксмо, 2012. — 320 с. — 6 000 экз. — ISBN 978-5-699-56581-8
- Чингиз Абдуллаев. Смерть дипломата: Роман. — Москва: Эксмо, 2012. — 352 с. — 8 000 экз. — ISBN 978-5-699-56997-7
- Чингиз Абдуллаев. Забава королей: Роман. — Москва: Эксмо, 2012. — 352 с. — 6 000 экз. — ISBN 978-5-699-57650-0
- Чингиз Абдуллаев. Твой смертный грех: Роман. — Москва: Эксмо, 2012. — 288 с. — 7 000 экз. — ISBN 978-5-699-58171-9
- Чингиз Абдуллаев. Равновесие страха: Роман. — Москва: Эксмо, 2012. — 288 с. — 5 000 экз. — ISBN 978-5-699-58736-0
- Чингиз Абдуллаев. Семейные тайны: Роман. — Москва: Эксмо, 2012. — 320 с. — 6 000 экз. — ISBN 978-5-699-59908-0
- Чингиз Абдуллаев. Искусство выживания: Роман. — Москва: Эксмо, 2012. — 320 с. — 6 000 экз. — ISBN 978-5-699-60323-7
- Чингиз Абдуллаев. Пьедестал для аутсайдера: Роман. — Москва: Эксмо, 2012. — 320 с. — 6 000 экз. — ISBN 978-5-699-61239-0
- Чингиз Абдуллаев. Адепты стужи. // Хранители холода; Западный зной; Восточный ветер; Шпионы, не вернувшиеся с холода: Романы. — Баку: Qanun, 2013. — 840 с. — ISBN 978-9952-26-386-2
- Чингиз Абдуллаев. Под знаком полумесяца: Роман. — Москва: Эксмо, 2013. — 320 с. — 6 000 экз. — ISBN 978-5-699-63199-5
