= Nigar Rafibeyli =

Azerbaijani writer (1913–1981)

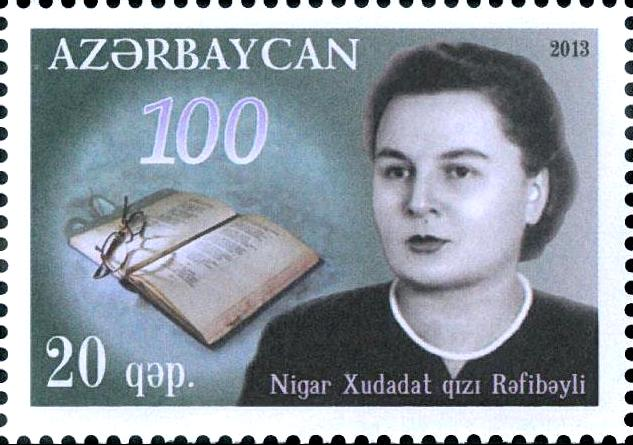
- House plate on a residence of Rza and Rafibeyli
- Born: 23 June 1913 Ganja, Azerbaijan
- Died: 9 July 1981 (aged 68) Baku, Azerbaijan
- Occupation: Writer
- Children: Anar Rzayev

Nigar Khudadat qizi Rafibeyli (Azerbaijani: Nigar Xudadat qızı Rəfibəyli) (1913–1981, Baku) was an Azerbaijani writer and the Chairman of the Writers' Union of Azerbaijan. She was the wife of the famous writer and poet Rasul Rza. The writer Anar Rzayev is their son.

== Early life ==
Nigar Rafibeyli was born on 23 June 1913 in the town of Ganja. Her parents were medical surgeons. Her father, Khudadat Rafibeyli was the first Azeri surgeon who had studied in Europe. In 1919, he was invited to head the Ganja government by the republican government of Azerbaijan Democratic Republic, but he was soon arrested at the instigation of the Armenian Bolsheviks and sent to Nargin island, where he was executed by Bolshevik soldiers. Nigar Rafibeyli finished her schooling in Ganja and moved to Baku for her higher education. She studied at the Pedagogical Technical School. She taught at school but always wrote novels. Her first poem called "Chadra" (Veil in Azeri) was published in "Dan Ulduzu" magazine in 1928. In the years 1930–1932 she worked in the Azerbaijanfilm studio.

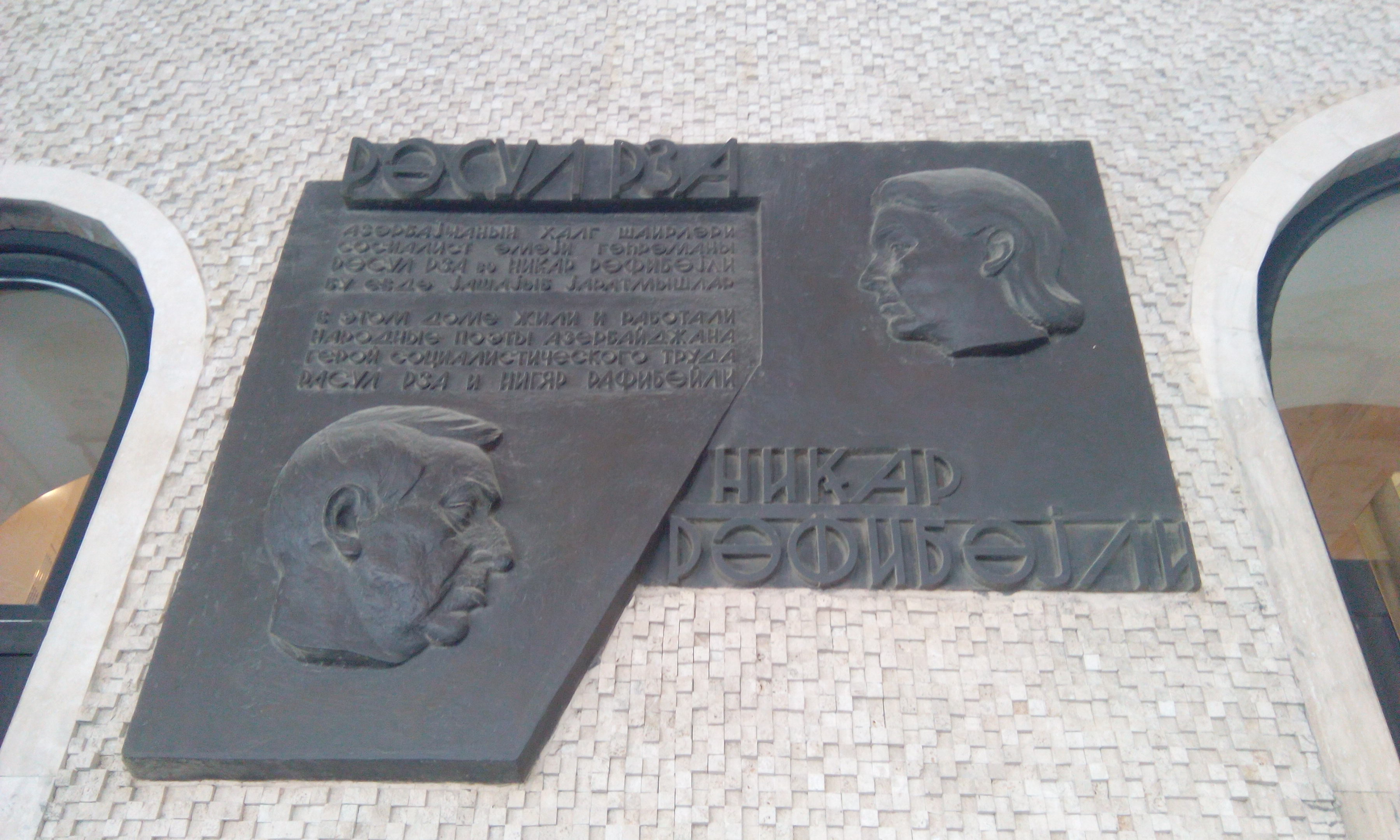
Plaque on building where Azerbaijani poets Rasul Rza and Nigar Rafibayli lived in Baku

== Later years ==
In 1931, she worked in the Azerneshr publishing house as the editor and as a translator. Rafibeyli then continued her studies in the Moscow Pedagogical University. As she was studying in Moscow, her first collection of poems was published in Baku. In the years 1937–1939, she worked in the Ushaqneshr publishing house. Beginning from 1940, she translated into Azeri many works of famous poets and writers of other nations such as Navai, Schiller, Pushkin, Lermontov, Shevchenko and others. For her great contributions to Azerbaijani literature, she received the Order of Honour. Many of Nigar Rafibeyli's works were dedicated to romanticism, motherhood, nature, and motherland.

Nigar Rafibeyli died on 9 July 1981. One of streets in Baku bears her name.
