= Ashiq Najaf Dashkandli =

- Aşıq Nəcəf Daşkəndli
- Born: 1867; Dashkent, Nor Bayazet uezd, Erivan Governorate, Russian Empire
- Died: 1919 (aged 51–52); Nor Bayazet uezd, First Republic of Armenia
- Occupations: ashiq, poet
- Writing career
- Pen name: Daşkəndli
- Language: Azerbaijani
- Genre: poem

Ashiq Najaf Dashkandli (Azerbaijani: Aşıq Nəcəf Daşkəndli; 1867 – 1919) was an Azerbaijani ashik and poet.

== Biography ==
Najaf Allahverdi oglu was born in 1867 in the village of Dashkent, Novo-Bayazet District. He was descended from the Kalvalılar lineage.

For ten years, Najaf was an apprentice of Ashig Alasgar, a renowned ashiq of his time, and performed alongside him at wedding celebrations. Ashiq Najaf was Ashig Alasgar's most highly regarded and beloved of his twelve apprentices. Owing to the exceptional range of their voices, Ashiq Najaf and Ashiq Asad stood out among other ashıqs of their time.

In 1910, while travelling to Iran to perform at a wedding celebration, Ashiq Najaf and Ashiq Asad were each presented with a ten-stringed “Khatai" saz by a master of the Tabriz ashiq tradition as a gesture of respect and esteem.

For his outstanding performance of the traditional saz melody “Ayag Jalili”, the melody subsequently came to be known as “Najafi”. To this day, most ashıqs and researchers refer to this particular saz melody by that name.

Ashiq Najaf Dashkentli was the master and mentor of Alimardanli Ashiq Zulfugar and Jilli Ashiq Mehdi, making an exceptional contribution to their development as accomplished masters of the ashiq tradition.

In 1913, Ashiq Najaf, together with Garaimanli Mashadi Isa and Ashiq Asad, took part in the celebrations held in St. Petersburg to mark the 300th anniversary of the Romanov dynasty. He was awarded a monetary prize on that occasion.

Ashiq Najaf married his cousin Gulistan. They had five sons: Shamiddin, Shamistan, Mikayil, Astan, and Ismayil.

In 1919, during the Armenian-Azerbaijani conflicts that took place in the Novo-Bayazet District, Ashiq Najaf was killed by Armenians along with Zodlu Samad Agha, Shishqayali Kor Tanriverdi, and others.

To date, nearly one hundred books, journal and newspaper articles have been published on the life and creative work of Ashiq Najaf, and television and radio programs have also been produced about him. Ashiq Asad Rzayev, Khasta Bayramali, Hasan Khayalli, Khalil Rza Uluturk, Ali Gurban Dastanchi, Zelimkhan Yaqub, Mashallah Khudubayli, and others have addressed the life and creative legacy of Ashiq Najaf Dashkentli in their works.

Several works have been devoted specifically to Ashiq Najaf, including the dastan "Ashiq Najaf and Gulistan" by Sarraf Shiruye, the poem “Najaf” by Eldar Ismayil, the masnavi “The Dastan of Ashiq Najaf” by Khasay Zeynalov, and the narrative “The Story of Ashiq Najaf and Ashiq Asad's Journey to Shamshaddin” by Abbas Vafadaghlı.

In 2026, the publishing house “Elm ve Tehsil” published a book entitled The Broken Saz, the Burned Ashiq, devoted to the life and creative work of Ashiq Najaf.
