= Verin Shorzha =

Village in Gegharkunik, Armenia

Verin Shorzha Վերին Շորժա
- Location within Armenia Location within Gegharkunik
- Coordinates: 40°05′14″N 45°49′57″E
- Country: Armenia
- Province: Gegharkunik
- Municipality: Vardenis
- Elevation: 2,347 m (7,700 ft)

Population (2011)
  - Total: 23
- Time zone: UTC+4 (AMT)

Verin Shorzha (Armenian: Վերին Շորժա) is a village in the Vardenis Municipality of the Gegharkunik Province of Armenia. Verin Shorzha and the nearby Nerkin Shorzha are both reached by a short drive from Ayrk.

== History ==
Originally, the village was completely Armenian. Azerbaijanis moved in around 1928, and left during the outbreak of the Nagorno-Karabakh conflict.
