= Nerkin Shorzha =

Village in Gegharkunik, Armenia

Nerkin Shorzha Ներքին Շորժա
- Location within Armenia Location within Gegharkunik
- Coordinates: 40°06′36″N 45°50′10″E
- Country: Armenia
- Province: Gegharkunik
- Municipality: Vardenis

Population (2011)
  - Total: 12
- Time zone: UTC+4 (AMT)

Nerkin Shorzha (Armenian: Ներքին Շորժա) is a village in the Vardenis Municipality of the Gegharkunik Province of Armenia. Nerkin Shorzha and nearby Verin Shorzha are both reached by a short drive from Ayrk.
