= Afag Bashirgyzy =

Azerbaijani actress

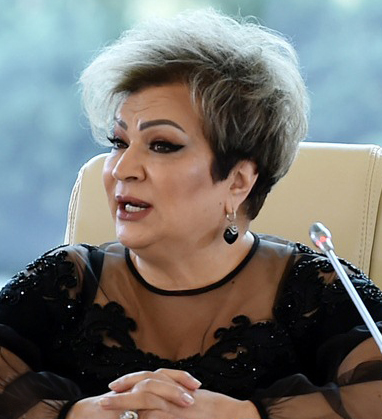
- Afag Bashirgyzy in 2019
- Born: Afag Bashir gyzy Safarova; August 15, 1955 (age 70); Baku, Azerbaijan Soviet Socialist Republic
- Occupation: actress
- Years active: 1973–
- Father: Bashir Safaroglu

Afag Bashirgyzy (Azerbaijani: Afaq Bəşirqızı), born Afag Bashir gyzy Safarova (1955, Baku, Azerbaijani: Afaq Bəşir qızı Səfərova), is an Azerbaijani actress.

== Life and career ==
Afag Bashirgyzy was born in 1955 to the family of a renowned Azerbaijani comedian, Bashir Safaroglu. From 1974 to 1979, she studied at the Cultural Education faculty of Azerbaijan State University of Culture and Arts. She started her acting career in 1973 at the Lenkoran State Drama Theater, soon gaining a reputation as a talented actress. In 1975, she moved to Sumgait to work at the Sumgait Drama Theater. Starring mainly in comedies, Afaq Bashirgyzy was listed as one of the top Azerbaijani comedian actresses. One of her best performances was in the role of Söylü, a wife of an unsuccessful poet and pregnant mother of six children, in the film The Engagement Ring.

In 1989, she began working at Azerbaijan Drama Theatre, performing main roles in Subaylarınızdan görəsiniz (Have Bachelors), O olmasın, bu olsun (If Not That One, Then This One), Bankir adaxlı (Banker boyfriend), Məhəbbət oyunu (The Love Game), İtgin gəlin (The Lost Bride), Məsmə xala dayımdır (Aunt Mesme is my Uncle), among others. She also starred in Azerbaijani films Bəxt üzüyü (The Engagement Ring), Yaşıl eynəkli Adam (The Man in Green Glasses) and Nekroloq (The Necrolog).

Currently, Bashirgyzy teaches acting at the Azerbaijan State University of Culture and Arts. In 2009, she opened the Bashir Safaroglu Theater in Moscow, naming it after her late father.

Afag Bashirgyzy is married with one son.

== Awards ==
- Merited Actress, 1989
- People's Artist, 1993
- Qızıl Dərviş (Golden Dervish), 1993, 2003
- Presidential Award, 2010
- Best of the best, 2011
- Vagif Samadoghlu Medal, 2020
