= Əyin =

- Village
- Location within Azerbaijan
- Coordinates: 39°20′48″N 46°29′07″E
- Country: Azerbaijan (de jure)
- Rayon: Qubadli
- Time zone: UTC+4 (AZT)
  - Summer (DST): UTC+5 (AZT)

Əyin (also, Eyin) is a village in the Qubadli Rayon of Azerbaijan.

== Notable natives ==
- Suleiman Rahimov — writer, People's writer of the Azerbaijan SSR (1960).
