= National Conservatory of Azerbaijan =

On June 13, 2000, the third president of Azerbaijan, Heydar Aliyev, issued a special order for the establishment of the National Conservatory of Azerbaijan (NCA) located in Baku, the capital of country. In accordance with this order, national artist Siyavush Karimi Ashraf was elected to the position of rector of the conservatory. The following year, Baku Music College and Republic Art Gymnasium were added to further expand the institution. The former and current professors of the conservatory hold expertise in various diverse backgrounds including conducting, composition, and singing. Many are professional musicians or prominent social public figures.

== NCA departments ==
=== Department of Human Resources ===
The Department of Human Resources encompasses various subsets and their duties including those of the Board of Directors, Supervisory and Audit Commission members, and their various personal affairs.

=== Department of Youth and Sport ===
The Department of Youth and Sport organizes of youth leisure time via athletic activities and the development of various policy at the Azerbaijan National Conservatory Association. These activities include football (US. Soccer), volleyball, basketball, youth patriotism clubs, and a charity-run association named after Uzeyir Hajibeyov.

=== Department of International Relations ===
The Department of International Relations allows for opportunities for connection between local and foreign students at the university. The department organizes various opportunities for the participation of students in foreign training and consular projects.

=== Department of Projects ===
The Department of Projects crowdsources its projects and initiatives from the students' ideas, incentivizing a culture of students who want to build, create, become active, and realize their passions. The diverse projects benefit the culture of the university and the broader local community.

=== Department of Science and Education ===
The Department of Science and Education aims to help the development of the students' intellectual abilities. The Department carries out various educational projects and organizes diverse training and scientific conferences and works in tandem with the Student Scientific Society, Conversation Club, Theater Club, and Book Club(s), all of which fall under the Science and Education Department umbrella.

== See also ==
- Music of Azerbaijan
