= Ayrk =

Village in Gegharkunik, Armenia

Ayrk Այրք
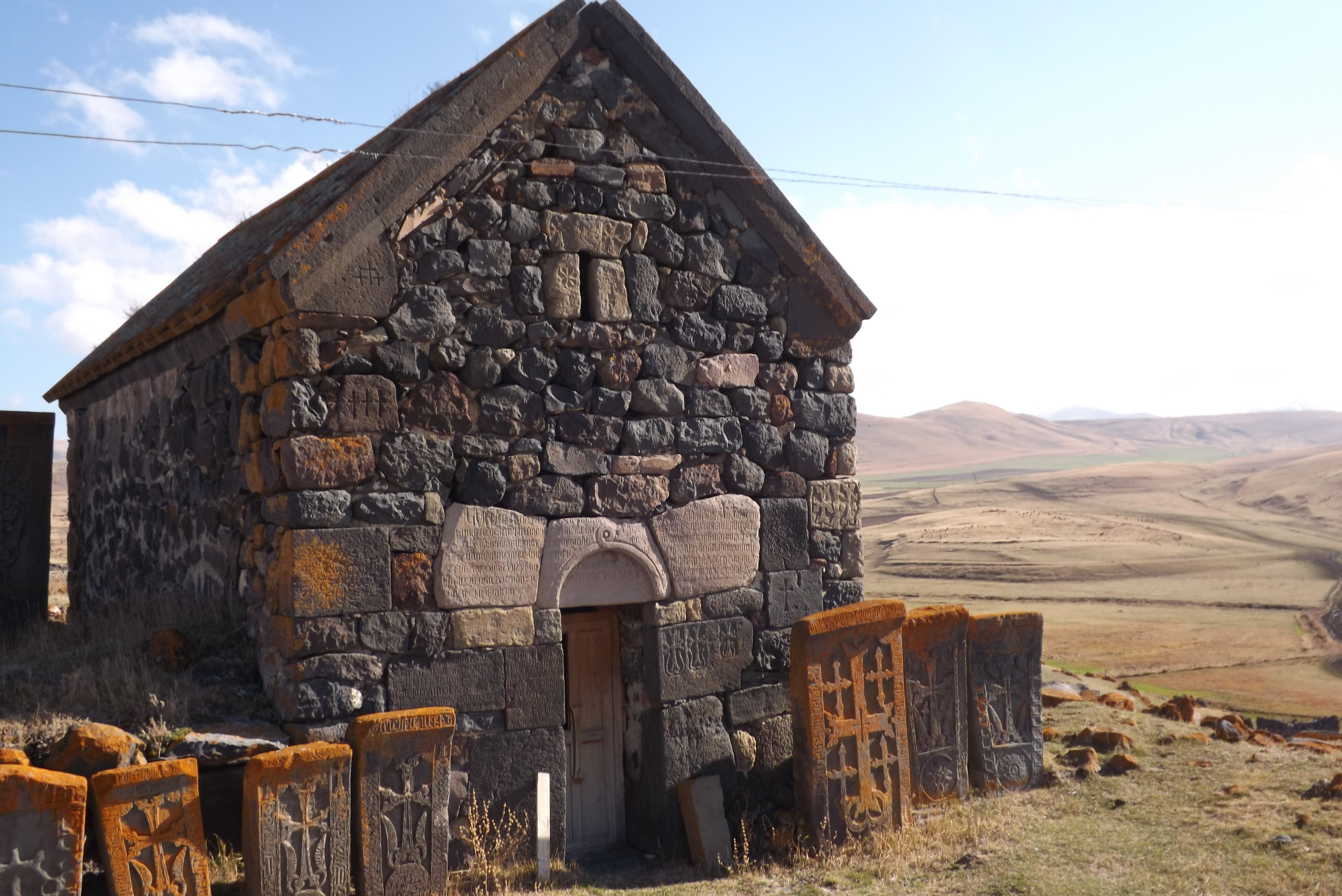
- Church in Ayrk

- Location within Armenia Location within Gegharkunik
- Coordinates: 40°07′26″N 45°47′26″E
- Country: Armenia
- Province: Gegharkunik
- Municipality: Vardenis
- Elevation: 2,151 m (7,057 ft)

Population (2011)
  - Total: 317
- Time zone: UTC+4 (AMT)
- Postal code: 1605

Ayrk (Armenian: Այրք) is a village in the Vardenis Municipality of the Gegharkunik Province of Armenia.

== History ==
The village contains the Church of St. Astvatsatsin dated to 1181 AD, and the 13th-century Katoghike St. Gevorg church, 150 meters apart from each other. Both churches have large adjoining cemeteries, and between them are the remains of massive stone walls of an Iron Age fortification with shallow caves below.

In 1953, part of the population of Dashkent, at the suggestion of the leadership of the Azerbaijan SSR, moved to the Barda region and founded a village there under the same name Yeni Dashkend.

== Gallery ==
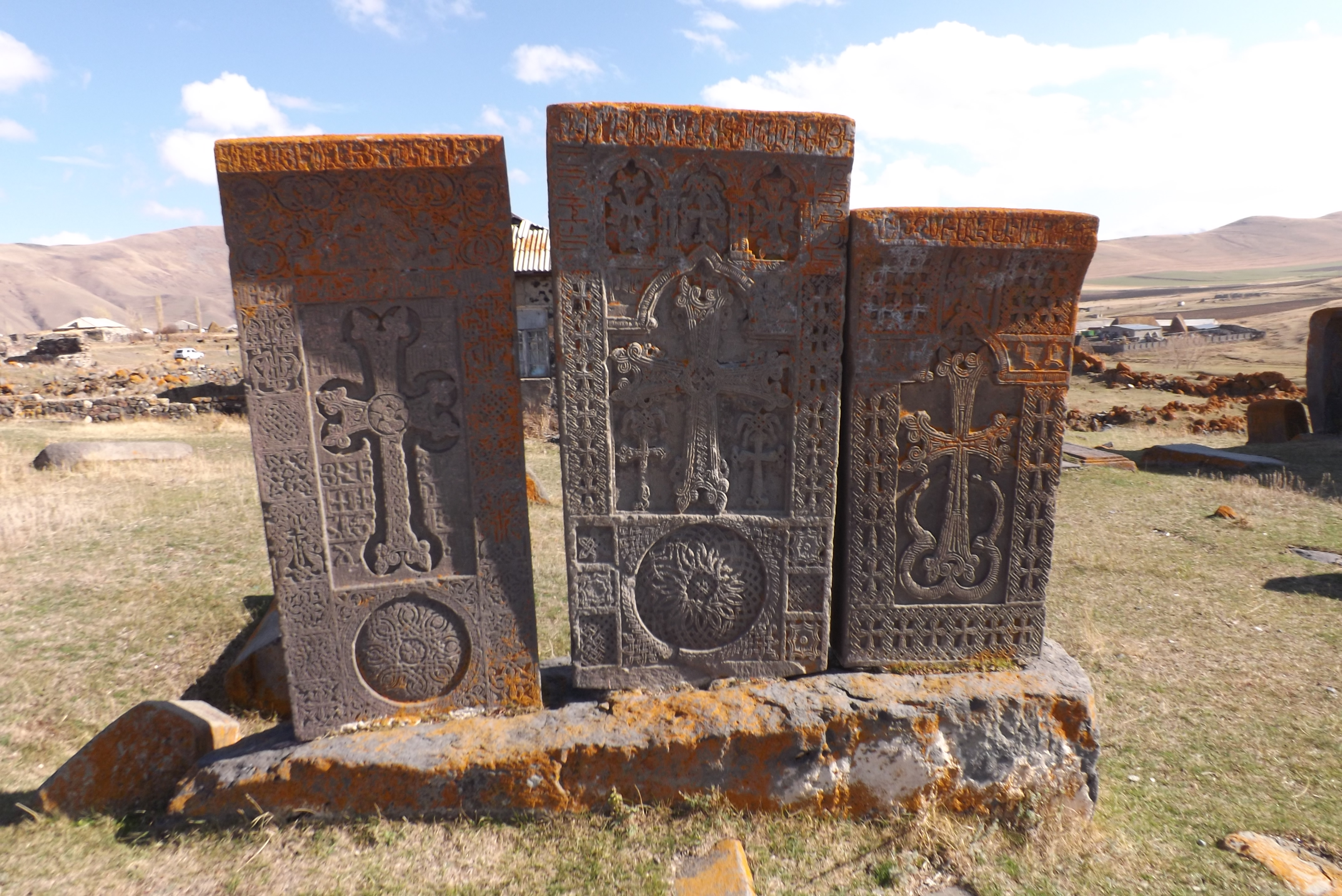
Khachkars in Ayrk

== Notable people ==
- Ashiq Najaf Dashkandli (1867-1919), is an Azerbaijani ashiq and poet.
- Rustam Dastanoglu (born 1960), is an Azerbaijani writer-publicist.
