= Rasul Rza =

Azerbaijani writer (1910–1981)

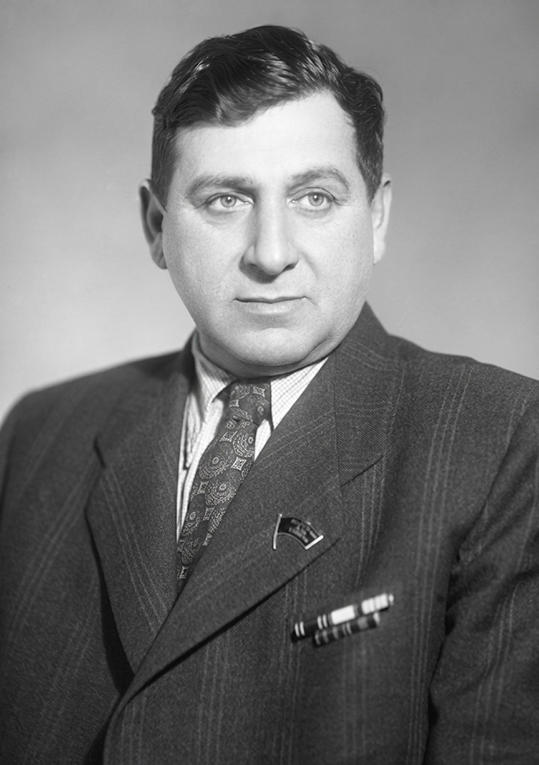
- Rasul Rza in 1954
- Born: May 19, 1910 Goychay, Russian Empire
- Died: April 1, 1981 (aged 70) Baku, Azerbaijan SSR, USSR
- Occupation: Writer
- Children: Anar Rzayev

Rasul Rza (real name Rasul Ibrahim oghlu Rzayev – Azerbaijani: Rəsul İbrahim oğlu Rzayev) (1910 – 1981 in Baku), was an Azerbaijani writer, Hero of Socialist Labour (1980), People's Poet of Azerbaijan, Laureate of Soviet State Award and the Chairman of the Writers' Union of Azerbaijan. He was the husband of Azerbaijani writer Nigar Rafibeyli and the father of writer Anar Rzayev.

== Life and writings ==
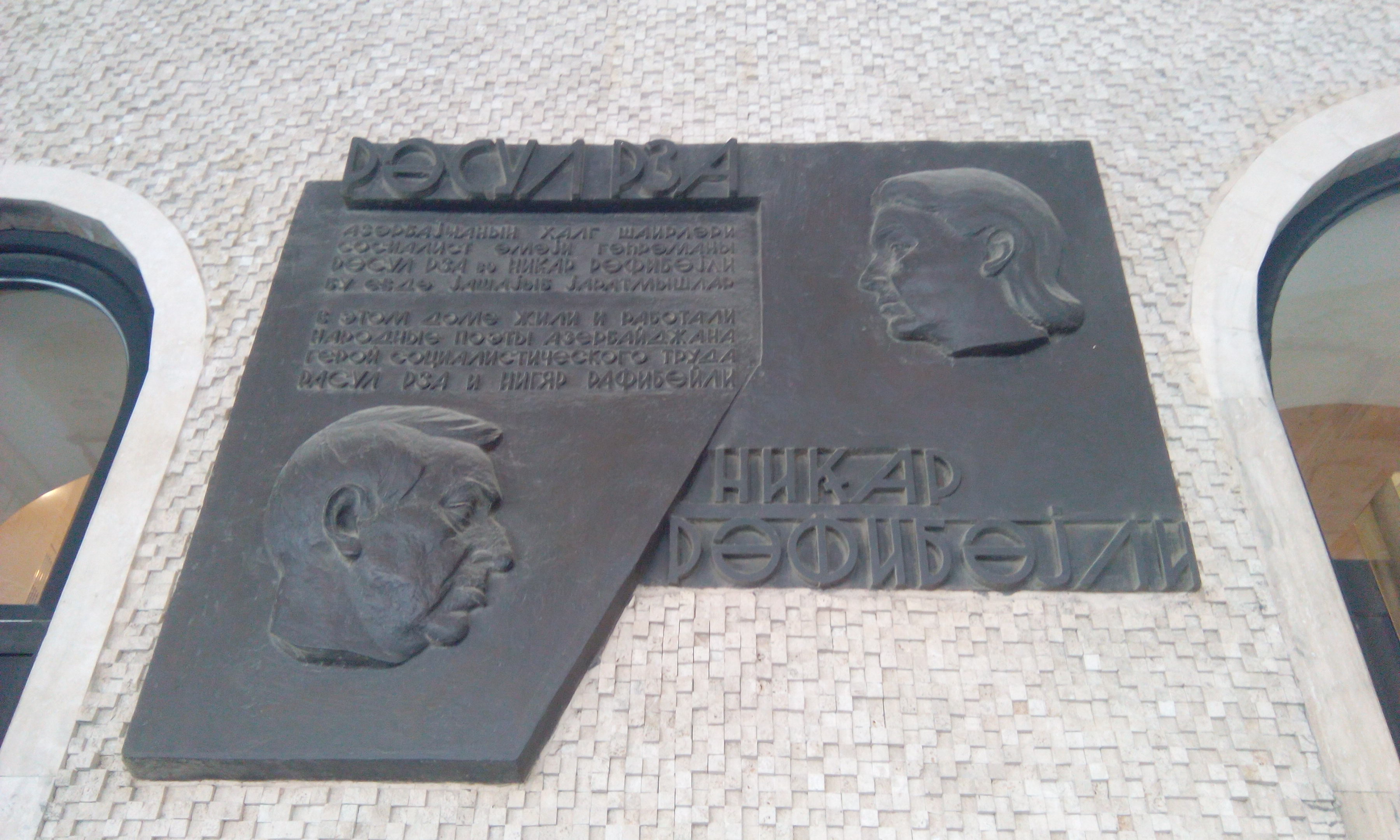
Plaque on building where Azerbaijani poets Rasul Rza and Nigar Rafibeyli lived in Baku

Rasul Rza was born Rasul Ibrahim oglu Rzayev on May 19, 1910, in Goychay. He studied at the Transcaucasus Communist University, the Azerbaijan Scientific Research Institute and the Soviet Cinematography Institute. He was Chairman of Writers' Union of Azerbaijan in 1939, minister of Azerbaijani Cinematography (1945–48), chief editor of the Azerbaijani Soviet Encyclopedia (1966–75), and a member of the board of directors of the USSR Union of Writers (from 1964). From the start of his writing career, he adopted a shortened name Rasul Rza.

His first poem was called Bu gün (Today), published in Tbilisi. His serious, multidimensional writings began in the 1930s. During the Great Patriotic War, he published many novels calling for patriotic spirit. He also wrote a poem about Lenin. In the 1960s, he began writing in a more philosophical tone, relating his novels to intellectual themes, analytical thinking, philosophical approach to daily life, and so forth. The lyrical poems, dramas and prose works he wrote hinted at a sustained and subtle criticism of the Soviet regime, for which he was banned from writing for a period of time. Additionally, he began composing songs based on his poems.

He died in Baku on April 1, 1981, and was buried in Fakhri Khiyaban. A commemoration ceremony was held in his honor in Ankara in 2010. The writers of Azerbaijan started a Rasul Rza Foundation and present awards to successful writers. It is chaired by Fikrat Goja.
