= Anar Rzayev =

Azerbaijani writer (born 1938)

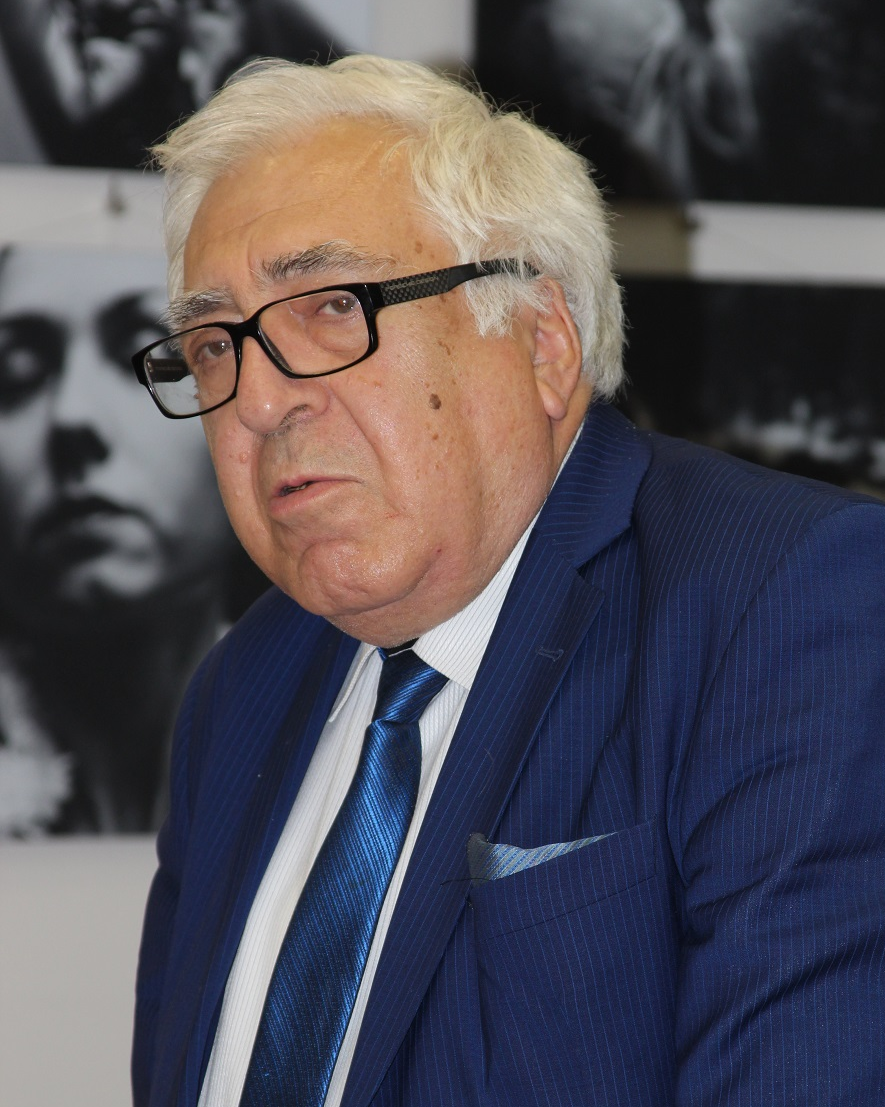
- Anar in 2016.
- Born: Anar Rəsul oğlu Rzayev; 14 March 1938 (age 88); Baku, Azerbaijan SSR, Soviet Union
- Education: Bachelor of Arts
- Alma mater: Baku State University
- Occupations: Writer, dramatist, film director
- Relatives: Rasul Rza, Nigar Rafibeyli
- Writing career
- Genre: Fantasy

Anar Rasul oghlu Rzayev (Azerbaijani: Anar Rəsul oğlu Rzayev; born 14 March 1938, Baku), known mononymously as Anar, is an Azerbaijani writer, dramatist, film director, and the Chairman of the Writers' Union of Azerbaijan. Anar is primarily a novelist and short-story writer, although in the past, he has also authored screenplays and directed films as well as acted in a film.

== Early years ==
Anar was born to the Azerbaijani poets Rasul Rza (1910–1981) and Nigar Rafibeyli (1913–1981). After finishing a 10-year music school in Baku, he enrolled in the Philology Department at the Baku State University. He later completed courses in screenwriting and production in Moscow.

== Works ==
Anar began publishing in the 1960s. His works include: "Longing for the Holiday" (Bayram Həsrətində), "The Rain Stopped" (Yağış Kəsdi), "White Port" (Ağ Liman), "A Person's Person" (Adamın Adamı), "The Sixth Floor of the Five-Storey Building" (Beşmərtəbəli Evin Altıncı Mərtəbəsi) later used for the movie Tahmina, "Opportunity" (Macal), "I've Come to You" (Sizi Deyib Gəlmişəm), "Without You" (Sizsiz), "Summer Days of the City" (Şəhərin Yay Günləri), "Hotel Room" (Otel Otağı), and "Me, You, Him and the Telephone" (Mən, Sən, O və Telefon).

He has written the scripts for various movies, including Torpaq. Dəniz. Od. Səma ("The Land. The Sea. The Fire. The Sky"), Gün Keçdi ("The Day Passed") and Dədə Qorqud. Anar was the scenarist and producer of the film Üzeyir Ömrü ("The Life of Uzeyir").

== Recognition ==
Anar has been recognized with the following awards: Honored Art Worker of Azerbaijan (1976), Azerbaijan State Prize (1980) and Istiglal Order (Order of Sovereignty) in 1998.

Anar is the President of the Writers' Union of Azerbaijan and was a Member of the Supreme Soviet and National Assembly several times.

== Volumes Published in English ==
- Volume 1: Dante's Jubilee & Other Short Stories (2017) (PDF – Free download)
- Volume 2: Hotel Room & Other Stories (2017) (PDF – Free download)
