= Javanshir Vakilov =

Azerbaijani diplomat (1951–2013)

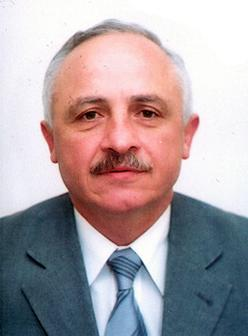
Javanshir Vakilov

Javanshir Mehdikhan Vаkilov (Azerbaijani: Cavanşir Mehdixan oğlu Vəkilov) (February 7, 1951 – August 23, 2013) was an Azerbaijani diplomat, candidate of historical science since 1988, public and political figure, writer and pedagogue.

== Life ==
Vakilov was born on February 7, 1951, in Baku. He graduated from secondary school number 190 in 1967. He studied the philology of Iran in the faculty of East Studies at the Azerbaijan State University (present: Baku State University) from 1967 to 1972. After graduation he worked as an interpreter in Afghanistan from 1972 to 1975 and in Iran in 1978, and witnessed anti-monarchist revolutions in both countries. He went from head laboratory assistant to the scientific worker during last months of 1975 at the Manuscript Fond of Azerbaijan Academy of Science and, from 1976 to 1992, at the East Studies Institute of Azerbaijan Academy of Science, and defended his thesis on the topic of “Participation of Azerbaijan Republic in the Cultural Relations between USSR and Iran (1941-1946 years)” in 1988.

== Activities abroad and in motherland ==
After the independence of Azerbaijan, he changed his profession to the field of diplomacy in March 1992 and became Secretary First and Secretary Second at the Ministry of Foreign Affairs, and worked as a Secretary Second at the embassy of Azerbaijan in Tehran from May 1, 1995, to November 5, 1998. He took part in Diplomatic Courses held in Ankara (1993), Tehran (1994, as a head of representation) and in Cairo (2002, as a head of representation). He participated in the talks of President of Azerbaijan Republic, Heydar Aliyev with the delegations of Iran as an interpreter from Persian in 1993–1995, and was in the delegation during the visits of President to Tehran (1994, 2000, 2002), Ashgabat (1994) and Mashhad (1996). He made contributions to the establishment of diplomatic relations between the Republic of Azerbaijan and Republic of Slovenia. After the end of diplomatic activity in Iran, he returned to the Ministry of Foreign Affairs in November 1998, and took a position of the head of the department of Middle East and South Asia of the Second Territory Office since 2000. Vakilov was risen to the rank of the second degree counselor on July 1, 2003. On September 15, 2003, he was appointed a counselor of the Embassy of the Republic of Azerbaijan to the Islamic Republic of Iran.

After the earthquake occurred on 26 December 2003 in Bam, Kerman province, Iran, Vakilov received an official message of thanks for his support to the brigade of doctors (16 people), the group of rescuers (24 people), the members (2 people) of ANC TV channel in their work of broadcasting events to the world on an official journey on 27–31 December, and for his support to the arrangement of the work of the delegation of the Republic of Azerbaijan sent on a journey to Islamic Republic of Iran, for his exemplary and professional work done in a very bad conditions, in cold weather, in the lack of water and food, in a tent set up in a desert while earthquake continued to shake. The official letter of thanks was sent to the Ministry of Foreign Affairs in order to be included in his curriculum vitae.

On October 20, 2004, he organized the opening of Consulate General of the Republic of Azerbaijan in Tabriz and was a first substitute of Consul General there until March 7, 2005 (unofficially till the beginning of April). The appointment of nephew of national poet Samad Vurghun to this position was welcomed by Iran Azerbaijan's intellectuals, and articles about this were published in the press of Tabriz (“Mahd-e azadi”, 25.10.2004; Journal “Körpü” (in Azerbaijani, with Latin graphics), Tabriz, N46. Winter, 2005, page 5).

He was risen to the diplomatic rank of first degree counselor on January 7, 2007. He was awarded to the Jubilee Medal of the Republic of Azerbaijan “90 years of Diplomatic Service organizations of the Republic of Azerbaijan (1919-2009)". He was a member of editorial boards of books of Jamil Hasanli "Azərbaycan Xalq Cümhuriyyətinin xarici siyasəti (1918-1920)" (Foreign Policy of Azerbaijan Democratic Republic (1918-1920)), Baku, 2009 and “Внешняя политика Азербайджанской Демократической Республики (1918-1920)” (Foreign Policy of Azerbaijan Democratic Republic (1918–1920)), Москва. Изд."Флинта", Изд."Наука" published on the occasion of 90 years jubilee of the Ministry of Foreign Affairs of Azerbaijan.

== Pedagogical and other activities ==
Parallel with his work in the Ministry of Foreign Affairs, Vakilov gave lectures on “Foreign policy of the Near and Middle East countries”, “Modern Diplomacy”, “Diplomatic documents”, “Diplomatic negotiations” at the Academy of Public Administration under the President of the Republic of Azerbaijan from 2001 to 2003 and 2007–2013. He wrote manuals for the subjects “Foreign policy of the Near and Middle East countries” and “Modern Diplomacy” and gave them to the library of the academy. He also was the head of the State Attestation Commission for the bachelor's degree of the Academy of Public Administration under the President of the Republic of Azerbaijan in the academic years 2008-2009 and 2009-2010 (extract from the orders of the rector of the Academy of Public Administration No. 10/60, dated 30.04.2009 and No. 10/52, dated 21.04.2010).

Vakilov wrote 23 scientific works and 49 articles about Azerbaijan–Iran relations and Azerbaijan literature. They were published in several languages including Azerbaijani, Russian and Persian in the different newspapers and journals of Baku, Teheran, Tabriz, Moscow and Dushanbe. He also published the poems of Samad Vurgun and Vagif Samadoglu, his articles and the article “Samad Vurgun and Iran” by Aybaniz Vakilova in the journals “Varlig”(“Creature”, editor Javad Heyat), “Azeri” (editor Behzad Behzadi), “Khudafarin”(editor Hussein Shargi), which printed in Teheran and in the newspapers “Fajr-e Azerbaijan” and Mahd-e azadi” (editor Seyid Masud Payman) which printed in Tabriz both in Persian and Turkish. He has a huge role in the introduction of Samad Vurgun and his literary activities, as well 90th and 100th anniversaries of poet in the Iran media. Vakilov had a role in the investigation of unknown sides of Samad Vurgun's heritage. He introduced the narrative “Ömür dedikləri bir karvan yolu”( “What’s called the Life is a caravan way” – 1986, after the death of his father Mehdikhan Vakilov), “Javanshir” novel (1992), “Anadillər” narrative (“Mother Languages”, 1991) and “Civilized revolution in Azerbaijan: 1920-1940s” monograph (2005) to public. “Javanshir” novel was published in the publishing house “Akhtar” (the owner is Samad Asyabi) in Tabriz in 2004. “Anadillər” narrative was published in the journal “Azeri” (Nation language and literature) under the editorship of Behzad Behzadi in Azerbaijani but with Arab scripts. One of his books, “Azerbaijan Republic and Iran: 1940s”, was published in Baku in 1991.

He was a specialist on Iran and participated in several international conferences since the beginning of his diplomatic career. Orientalist Tadeusz Swietochowski of the United States relied upon the Vakilov's works in his book “Russia and a borderland in transition Azerbaijan”. Vakilov is an author of articles such as “Tarixi keçmişimizə bir nəzər” (A look to our historical past) ["Kürün sahilində var əski bir köy"(There is an old village on the bank of the River Kur), “Vətən səsi” 25.7.1991].

Vakilov was a football champion of Kabul (three times) at the championship among foreign country teams within the USSR team while he was working in Afghanistan from 1972 to 1975. He was playing together with Sergey Salnikov – champion of Melbourne Olympics, former forward of Moscow “Spartak”, Yuri Sedov – 2nd trainer of USSR national team, defender of “Spartak”, Vladimir Streshnıy – former forward of Moscow CASP, Victor Chigirin – world champion on hockey. The above-mentioned sportsmen were coaching in different football teams of Afghanistan. Vakilov also participated in the championship among foreign diplomatic representatives while working in Iran from 1995 to 1998 and Azerbaijani team took 3rd place in this championship. Asaf Namazov, former defender of “Neftci”, who was working as a trainer in Tehran also played for the benefit of our team. Vakilov took part in mini-football championships among CIS embassies’ teams when he was 56. He also sent several recommendations to USSR Football Federation regarding the amendments in football rules and got feedback from them. When he was studying at school in 1967 he was one of the winners of football competition held by “Sportivniye iqri” (Moscow) magazine.

== Publications ==
- "Azərbaycan Respublikası və İran: 40-cı illər (mədəni əlaqələr)". Republic of Azerbaijan and Iran: 1940s (cultural relations). Baku, Publishing house "Elm", Year 1991. Print page 7,3.
- Look at the comments on the book: PhD Tağı İbrahimov. "Azərbaycan Respublikası və İran: 40-cı illər (mədəni əlaqələr)". Republic of Azerbaijan and Iran: 1940s (cultural relations), Newspaper "Elm", 20.2.1992.
- S.Hacılı. "Oxunmalı səhifələr" (Pages should be read), Newspaper "Ədəbiyyat və incəsənət", 24.4.1993.
- Dilşad Cabbarova. "Azərbaycan və İran: 20-ci əsrin birinci yarısı (mədəni əlaqələr)" (Azerbaijan and Iran: in the first half of the 20th century), Newspaper "Respublika", 19.7.2003.
- Also, 23 papers and 49 articles and writings.

== See also ==
- Mehdixan Vəkilov
- Səməd Vurğun
- Mirzəağa Əlizadə
- Yusif Səmədoğlu
- Vaqif Səmədoğlu
- Aybəniz Vəkilova
