= Union of Azerbaijani Writers =

- Azərbaycan Yazıçılar Birliyi
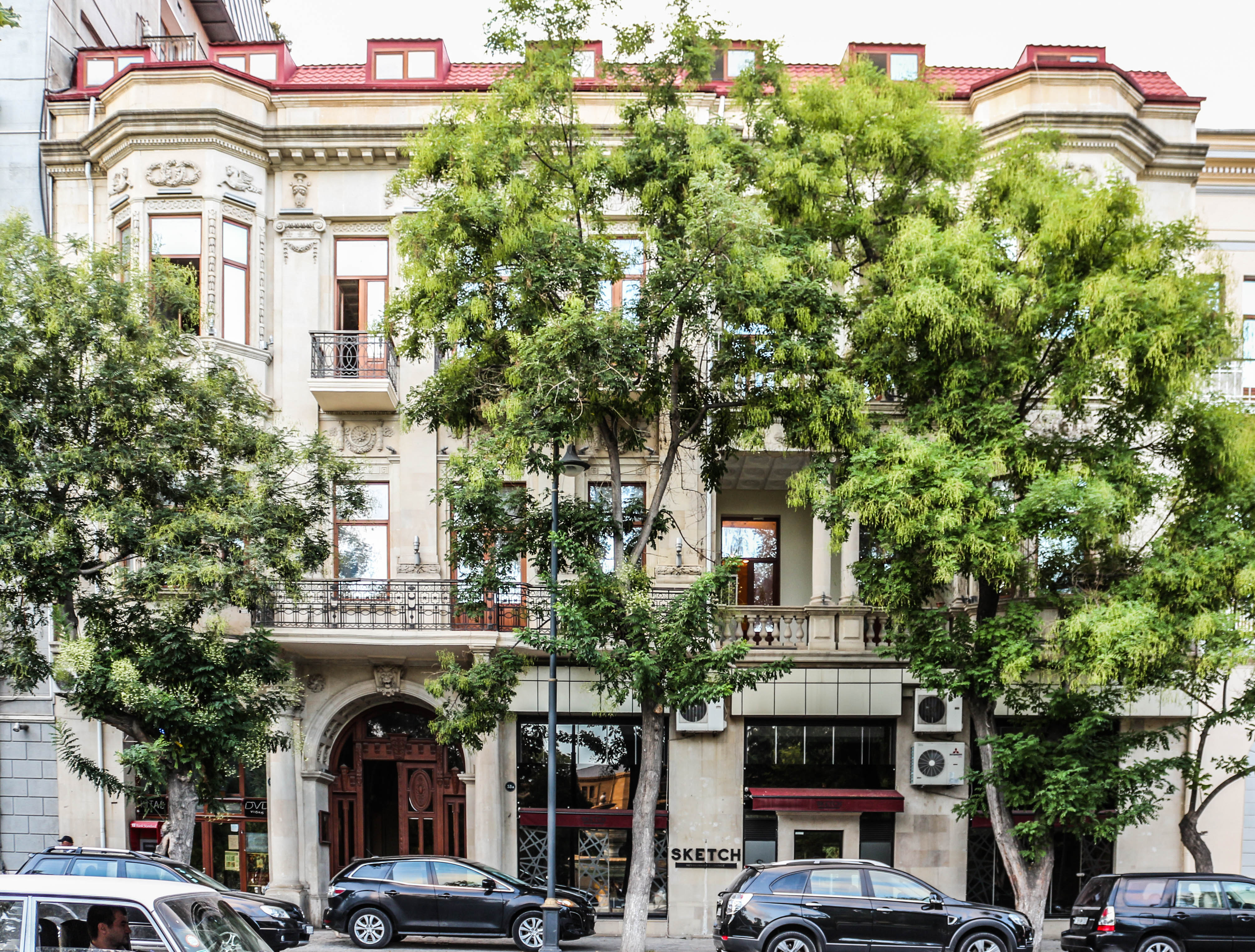
- Founded: June 13, 1934
- Headquarters: Baku
- Location: Azerbaijan
- Members: 1500 (2010)
- Key people: Anar
- Website: www.azyb.az

The Union of Azerbaijani Writers (Azerbaijani: Azərbaycan Yazıçılar Birliyi) is the largest public organization of Azerbaijani writers, poets and publicists. It has over 1500 members at present. It was founded on June 13, 1934, when Azerbaijan was a part of the Soviet Union as the Azerbaijan Soviet Socialist Republic.

== History ==
Prior to 1934, Azerbaijani writers grouped in variety of literary unions. In 1923, a group of writers formed the "İldırım" United Organization of Turkic Publicists and Poets. Later, in 1925, another organization known as "Qızıl qələmlər" (Golden Pens) was established uniting most writers and regularly conducting literary gathering events. The Union of Azerbaijani Writers was established on June 13, 1934. There were 93 members upon its registration. With its establishment, the organization also started publication of "Ədəbiyyat qəzeti" (Literature) newspaper. To this day, there have been 11 congresses held by the union in 1934, 1954, 1958, 1965, 1971, 1976, 1981, 1986, 1991, 1997 and 2004 which are normally held every 5 years.

== Structure ==
At the present, the Union has regional chapters in Ganja, Karabakh region, Lankaran, Mingachevir, Shaki, Shirvan region, Sumgayit, Guba, Qazakh and representative offices in Moscow (Russia), Borchali, (Georgia), Derbent (Dagestan), Istanbul (Turkey). The Union of Azerbaijani Writers if a multi-ethnic organization having members who write and publish in Azerbaijani, Russian, Lezgi, Talysh, Tat and other languages. The organization has a chairman, secretary and a board of directors who manage its activities. It is currently chaired by Anar (son of writer Rasul Reza) and its secretary is Chingiz Abdullayev.

=== Administration apparatus ===
- Anar — chairman of Azerbaijan Writers' Union
- Chingiz Abdullayev — first secretary
- Ilgar Fahmi — secretary
- Salim Babullaoghlu — secretary
- Elchin Huseynbeyli — secretary
- Rashad Majid — deputy chairman
- Rauf Aslanov - chief adviser

== Chairmen ==
Chairman of Union of Azerbaijani Writers
#	Period	Name	Role
1.	1934–1936	Mammadkazim Alakbarli	Chairman
2.	1936–1938	Seyfulla Shamilov	Chairman
3.	1938–1939	Rasul Rza	Chairman
4.	1939–1940	Suleyman Rahimov	Chairman
5.	1941–1944	Samad Vurgun	Chairman
6.	1944–1945	Suleyman Rahimov	Chairman
7.	1945–1948	Samad Vurgun	Chairman
8.	1948–1954	Mirza Ibrahimov	Chairman
9.	1958–1965	Mehdi Huseyn	Chairman
10.	1965–1968	Ismayil Shykhly	Chairman
11.	1970–1986	Mirza Ibrahimov	Chairman
12.	1975–1981	Imran Gasimov	Chairman
13.	1981–1987	Ismayil Shykhly	Chairman
14.	1987–present	Anar	Chairman
