= List of films declared state property of Azerbaijan =

The list of films declared state property of Azerbaijan has been prepared in accordance with the document approved by the Resolution No. 211 of the Cabinet of Ministers of the Republic of Azerbaijan dated 7 May 2019.

== List ==
Films declared state property in the Republic of Azerbaijan:

1. Sevil (film, 1929);
2. Latif (film, 1930);
3. Ismet (film, 1934);
4. By the Bluest of Seas (film, 1935);
5. Almas (film, 1936);
6. Baku people (film, 1938);
7. Peasants (film, 1939);
8. Sabuhi (film, 1941);
9. One Family (film, 1943);
10. Arshin mal alan (film, 1945);
11. The Meeting (film, 1955).

== Information about films ==
No.	Title	Poster	Notes
1	Sevil (film, 1929)		The film was created based on the play of the same name by Jafar Jabbarly.; Despite the fact that Izzet Orujova is not an actress, this film is her first cinematic work. Izzet Orujova is also one of the first national actresses of Azerbaijan.; The film is the first work of the cinematographer Askar Ismailov.
2	Latif (film, 1930)	—	The film is the first independent work of the director Mikayil Mikayilov's.; In 2001, the composer Salman Gambarov wrote the music for the film.; This is the first film in the history of Azerbaijani cinema where the main character is a child.
3	Ismet (film, 1934)		The film is dedicated to Leyla Mammadbeyova, the first Azerbaijani female pilot.; Sariya Khalilova, an Ali Bayramov's club member and a women's activist, was brutally murdered by her brother and father in 1933. Ismet is the prototype of Saria; In the movie are widely used decorations. During filming, there were delivered 27 sets.
4	By the Bluest of Seas (film, 1935)		The film is the first work of Mirza Mustafayev in the cinema, both as a cameraman and as a cameraman of staged scenes.; This is the first Azerbaijani film with sound. The film is also the first Soviet film with sound. The sound was written according to the system of the Russian scientist and inventor, engineer Pavel Tager.; This film is included in a mentioned I list of the 12 best works of world cinema of all time (in historical development as cinematography) by Bernard Eisenschitz (France). At the same time, the film was included in the III list (as an ordinary viewer) of Naum Kleiman (Russia) as the 12 best works of all time.; According to a survey conducted among the most influential film critics on the occasion of the 100th anniversary of world cinema, this film was included in the list of the 12 best works of world cinema. Thus, the journal “Kinovedcheskie Zametki” (notes of film critics), the most important book of all time for film historians, critics, theorists and film scholars from different countries, proposes to identify 12 best films. There were 3 nominations: 12 films that played a role in the development of the cinema like an art form (from the point of view of the historian) 12 films that are relevant and valuable for modern film culture (from the point of view of the critic) 12 films that you personally liked (from the point of view of the viewer). Film critic Naum Kleiman (Russia) and film theorist Bernard Eisenschitz (France) also included the title of the film "At the very blue sea" in their answers to the questionnaire.
5	Almas (film, 1936)	—	Jafar Jabbarli himself was supposed to make this film. He even completed all the preparatory work related to filming the film. But his sudden death interrupted the work.; "Almas" was the last silent film of Azerbaijani cinema. Actors do not talk here. Dialogues are given through letters. Only music accompanies the events in the film.
6	Baku people (film, 1938)		The film is dedicated to the revolutionary events that took place in Baku in 1905, the struggle to overthrow the tsarist absolutism.; The main roles are played by Rza Afganly, Nikolai Shulgin, O. Kutyreva, Boris Baikov, Vaso Godziashvili and V. Bagratuni.
7	Peasants (film, 1939)		The film is the first and last independent work of the director Samed Mardanov in artistic films.; The film is the first work of the actor Ismail Osmanli in cinema.; The film is the first work of the actor Mamedrza Sheikhzamanov in cinema.
8	Sabuhi (film, 1941)		The film is the first film work of the composer Tofig Guliyev.; The film is the first film work of director Rza Tahmasib.
9	A Family (1943 film)		The film consists of three short stories connected by a single storyline.; This film was banned until 1953. One of the main reasons for that was Stalin's dislike for the film. According to him, the struggle of the Soviet people against the German invaders is poorly reflected here.; The film is the first film work of the composer Gara Garayev.; The cinematographer Aydin Kazimzade in his book "Azerbaijani Filmmakers" mentioned an interesting fact about the film: during the filming, a tank explosion was supposed to be filmed in one of the scenes. At the request of Grigory Alexandrov and Lyubov Orlova, a military unit tank was brought to the square. The directors were informed that after filming, the tank would be sent to a military unit. The explosion had to be staged, and the scene had to be filmed with four cameras from different angles. But the tank exploded. An alarm went off and nearby soldiers arrived at the sound of the explosion. In the blink of an eye, the set was surrounded. At the time of the explosion, three of the four cameras were not working. The cameramen, shocked by the explosion, could not start the camera. Only the cameraman Leonid Koretsky did not lose his head and continued shooting. Thus, the tank, intended to be sent to the front, was destroyed.; On 1 March 2018, the Nizami Cinema Center hosted a presentation of the restored version of the film on the occasion of the 110th birth anniversary of Mir Jalal and the 100th anniversary of Gara Garayev.
10	Arshin mal alan (film, 1945)		Although the film was included in the plan of the studio for 1941, the shooting was postponed due to the start of the II World War.; The musical film was shown based on the eponymous operetta by the Azerbaijani composer Uzeyir Hajibeyov.; Only in 1945 this film (after its release) was watched by 16.27 million viewers. It became the leader of the box office, making in 8th place. (Catalogue of feature films of Home Cinematics. M., 1966).; As a result of a sociological research conducted on the occasion of the 100th anniversary of Russian cinema, "100 favorite films" were selected among the Soviet films that had a significant impact on the development of Soviet cinema and foreign productions that were shown in Soviet cinema. These films are divided into three parts - Gold, Silver and Bronze lists. The film comedy "Arshin Mal Alan" of 1945, according to the unanimous opinion of well-known film critics, is included in the "Golden List". In Soviet times, the film was shown in 136 countries and translated into 86 languages.; The Ministry of Culture and Tourism, with the financial support of the International Bank, brought to our country a copy of the film "Arshin Mal Alan" from the Moscow Film Fund and organized its restoration into Azerbaijani language. On 16 May 2006, the film was shown for the first time at occasion of its 60th anniversary.; The film was restored and colored in 2013 at the initiative of the Heydar Aliyev Foundation, with the support of AtaHolding and the Peachline company organization.
11	The Meeting (1955 film)		Although the film was included in the plan of the studio for 1941, the shooting was postponed due to the start of the II World War.; This is the first independent work of director Tofig Taghizade in the cinema.; The film is the first film work of the actor Aliagha Aghayev.; The film is the first film work of actress Barat Shekinskaya.; The film is the first film work of the actor Jeyhun Mirzayev.
