= Family in Azerbaijan =

Azerbaijani family traditions emphasize loyalty, mutual love, honesty, tolerance, and respect for older people and parents. Every person in the family must adhere to the rules and principles that are associated with their personal status and place in the family.

== History ==
The Azerbaijani people have a unique family type in the East. In a parent-child relationship, respect for adults is a fundamental value. In most cases, children live with their parents until they marry, although rarely, children continue to live with their parents after marriage.

Basic familial expectations include prioritizing the family, respecting and caring for family members, and remaining loyal to the regional traditions.

Until the beginning of the 20th century, large families were very common. In large families, kinship ties were emphasized and family leadership belonged to married or elderly men. The eldest son received the greatest share of the inheritance and, following the death of his father, became the head of the family.

Before the 20th century, Azerbaijani families existed in two categories: the first was the broad patriarchal families in which the representatives of two or three generations lived together with their father, mother and married sons; the second was the small family, which consisted of a husband, wife, and children.

It is possible to find examples of large family structure in Azerbaijan in the late 19th century and early 20th century into the Soviet era. In such families, orphan children would grow up under the influence of their uncle. The real estate was shared within the family according to the principles of Sharia law. The share of inheritance for male children was more than the inheritance for female children.

== Modern family model of Azerbaijan ==
Since the 20th century, Azerbaijani families can be divided into two groups: families living in districts or villages, who trend toward a more traditional family structure, or families living in bigger cities, such as Baku or in different countries of the world.

Prior to the 20th century, there were many families with 5-10 members. Moreover, extended families remained tight-knit. By the end of the 1980s, the concept of a smaller family had become more common, and strong relationships with extended families had become less frequent.

In the 1990s, an honorary title "mother heroine" was awarded for looking after and raising a large family with 10 children. This concept was abolished in the 1990s.

After gaining independence, mothers with four or five children were regarded as "mother heroine". But today, Azerbaijan mostly contains families with two to three children.

== Women in Azerbaijani family ==
The status of women in Azerbaijan has undergone major changes in recent history. The Azerbaijan Democratic Republic, formed in 1918, established gender equality rights. Thus, Azerbaijan became the first country in the East to accept a woman’s right to vote.

A number of events are held in Azerbaijan on International Family Day, which is celebrated worldwide, and aims to direct people's attention to family problems on May 15 each year. The selection of exemplary families at the "Family Holiday", organized by the State Committee for Family, Women and Children Affairs, as well as the holding of ceremonies in different regions of the country, has become a tradition.

At present, there are 1,831,100 families in the country and over the past five years, 766,000 new jobs have been created. Particular attention was paid to the creation of conditions for the comprehensive development of the family and the solution of their various problems.

=== Marriage age ===
The Family Code allowed marriage age for girls to be raised from 9 to 12 in 2011. According to these new rules, those forcing a woman to marry will be faced with either a fine of 2,000 to 3,000 manats or arrest and imprisonment for up to 2 years. If the same situation was committed against someone under age 12, the amount of the fine will be raised from 3,000 to 4,000 manats and the imprisonment period for up to 4 years.

== Laws ==
Azerbaijan joined the International Conventions on the strengthening of family, protection of women and children's rights, and accepted the relevant laws in Republic in the 1990s. In addition, Azerbaijan joined International Labor Organization (ILO) Recommendation #156 on "Equal opportunities and equal treatment for men and women workers - employees with family responsibilities", the UN Convention on the Elimination of All Forms of Discrimination Against Women, “on the rights of the child”, “on the protection of children related to inter-country adoption and cooperation”, "on Minimum age for Employment of Children in Agriculture", " on prohibition of child labor worst forms and urgent measures to eliminate child labor" and other conventions.

Laws related to family agriculture, children's rights, prevention of limitations on disabled children and their health, rehabilitation and social protection of disabled children, social protection of children who lost their parents, nutrition of infants and young children, about compulsory dispensary for children, the transnational organized crime of UN, convention on the prevention, suppression and punishment of human trafficking (especially women and children), on approval of the protocols against illegal crossing of migrants by land, sea and air, about the citizenship of a married woman, on regulation of human rights and freedom in the Azerbaijani Republic, about social services for the elderly, on the legal status of children born out of wedlock, on social protection of families with children and others have been accepted.

== The Code of Azerbaijani family ==
This Code defines standards governing the establishment and strengthening of family relationships, the principles of breaking relationships, the rights and duties of family members, the responsibilities of public authorities in this field, as well as the rules of state registration of civil status acts, in accordance with the fundamental human and civil rights and freedom envisaged in the Constitution of the Republic of Azerbaijan.

== State Committee for Family, Women and Children Affairs of Azerbaijan Republic ==
The State Committee for Family, Women and Children Affairs was created by the Decree of the Azerbaijani President on February 6, 2006 and Hijran Huseynova was appointed Chairman of the Committee by the Decree of the President dated February 6, 2006.

The State Committee on Women's Issues was established by the Decree of the President of the Republic of Azerbaijan dated January 14, 1998.

The Committee has been functioning to solve the existing problems in this period. The State Committee for Family, Women and Children Affairs of the Republic of Azerbaijan has been established with the Decree of the Azerbaijani President dated 6 February 2006. The State Committee for Family, Women and Children Affairs of Azerbaijan is the central executive body that carries out state policy and regulation in the field of work with family, women and children's problems.

The duties of the Committee are consisting of the comprehensive development and consolidation of the family institution, protection of family values, minimizing its problems, increasing the role of the family in society and improving its welfare. During the three years of activity, the committee has achieved a number of successes. In general, no government agency has been dealing with family problems in a centralized way in the country so far. First of all, a general database of families living in Azerbaijan was created, survey questionnaires were conducted in all cities and regions of the republic.

== See also ==
- Woman in Azerbaijan
- Culture of Azerbaijan
