= Women in Azerbaijan =

General statistics
- Maternal mortality (per 100,000): 26 (2017)
- Women in parliament: 17.3% (2020)
- Women over 25 with secondary education: 90.0% (2010)
- Women in labour force: 63.3% (2019)

Gender Inequality Index
- Value: 0.294 (2021)
- Rank: 70th out of 191

Global Gender Gap Index
- Value: 0.688 (2025)
- Rank: 100th out of 148

Women in Azerbaijan nominally enjoy the same legal rights as men; however, societal discrimination remains a problem. Baku Research Institute reports that: "Violations of privacy in political and social relations, such as interfering in private life, the sharing of private information, and unauthorized access to private space, are widespread in Azerbaijan".

== History ==
In 2022, the play Code name: "VXA" is about women who were the spouses of political prisoners during the Stalinist repressions in Azerbaijan.

== Voting rights ==
Universal suffrage was introduced in Azerbaijan in 1918 by the Azerbaijan Democratic Republic, thus making Azerbaijan the first Muslim-majority country ever to enfranchise women.

== Political representation ==
The State Committee for Family, Women and Children Affairs of Azerbaijan Republic is the primary government agency overlooking the activities in protection of rights of women in the country. There are no legal restrictions on the participation of women in politics. As of 2020, there were 22 women in the 125-seat parliament, including the Speaker of the National Assembly. The percentage of female members of parliament increased from 11 to 17.6 percent between 2005 and 2020.

In 2017, Mehriban Aliyeva (the president's wife) was appointed Vice President of Azerbaijan, the highest position a woman has occupied in Azerbaijan since the abolition in 1994 of the office of Secretary of State most recently occupied by Lala Shovkat.

In 2020, Sahiba Gafarova was appointed the Speaker of the National Assembly of Azerbaijan. As of the same year, Azerbaijan had one female cabinet minister (Mahabbat Valiyeva, Minister of Education), one regional cabinet minister (Natavan Gadimova, Minister of Culture of the Nakhchivan AR), one state committee chair (Bahar Muradova, chair of the State Committee for Family, Women and Children Affairs), one head of a regional executive government (Irada Gulmammadova, head of the Absheron District), Commissioner for Human Rights (Sabina Aliyeva), three ambassadors and one head of a diplomatic office. Women constituted 3 of the 16 members of the Central Election Commission and chaired 4 of the 125 district election commissions. Despite the fact that as of 2016, 11% of the country's professional judges were women (including Sona Salmanova, Deputy Chair of the Constitutional Court), this remains the lowest proportion in Europe.

=== Gender-based reprisals against women ===
In May 2021, Amnesty International published a briefing on gender-based reprisals against women in Azerbaijan, documenting systematic attempts to defame and silence women activists and their partners through smear campaigns, accusations, as well as blackmail by hacking to their social network accounts and publishing of private information, including material of sexual nature. Amnesty International’s Researcher on South Caucasus, Natalia Nozadze, stated that: "The pattern and methods of these gendered reprisals and the fact that the targets are women who have exposed human rights violations or been critical of the authorities, strongly indicates that the Azerbaijani authorities are either directly responsible or complicit in these crimes. It is the repressive government of Azerbaijan that stands to benefit from these dirty methods".

According to OCCRP "in recent years Azerbaijan has seen a spate of personal content released online. Many suspect the Azerbaijani government, noting that activists and journalists have been frequent targets" and the revealing photos and videos on social media are used as a tool of "revenge against speaking out".

== Participation in the job market ==
Though the majority of Azerbaijani women have jobs outside the home, women are underrepresented in high-level jobs, including top business positions.

As of 2017, 78.1% of all teaching staff (including 51.9% of all university lecturers), 64.9% of all medical staff and 40.2% of athletes in Azerbaijan were women. However, for the same period, women accounted for just 28.7% of civil servants and 20.9% of registered business owners.

== Military ==
In 1931, Leyla Mammadbeyova, born in Baku, became one of the first Soviet female aviators and paratroopers, the first one in the Caucasus and the Middle East. Around 600,000 natives of Azerbaijan fought in World War II as part of the Red Army, with 10,000 of those being women who had voluntarily signed up and served both as military and medical personnel, the most prominent ones being sniper Ziba Ganiyeva and pilot Zuleykha Seyidmammadova. During the active phase of the first Nagorno-Karabakh War in the 1990s, 2,000 of Azerbaijan's 74,000 military personnel were women, and 600 of them directly took part in the military operations. Military service for women is voluntary; currently there are around 1,000 women serving in the Azerbaijani army.

== Religion ==
Though a secular country, Azerbaijan requires certification and registration for people performing religious rites. Muslim women in Azerbaijan can study to become certified mullahs and lead women-only gatherings, a unique local tradition that goes back centuries. As of 2016, there was one local female Lutheran pastor in Azerbaijan.

== Domestic violence ==
In 2000, Azerbaijan signed up to the Optional Protocol of CEDAW, recognizing the competence of the Committee on the Elimination of Discrimination against Women, after which it can receive and consider complaints from individuals or groups within its jurisdiction.

On 22 June 2010, the Azerbaijani Parliament adopted the Law on Prevention of Domestic Violence.

Rape is illegal in Azerbaijan and carries a maximum 15-year prison sentence. A new domestic violence law come into force in 2010, which criminalized spousal abuse, including marital rape. Nevertheless, others highlight that in reality many in Azerbaijan do not consider this as a crime and the prevailing culture does not encourage complaints about marital rape.

During 2011 female members of parliament and the head of the State Committee on Women and Children increased their activities against domestic violence. Media coverage of domestic violence issues also began to raise awareness of the problem. A 2010 law establishes a framework for investigation of domestic violence complaints, defines a process to issue restraining orders, and calls for the establishment of a shelter and rehabilitation center for victims.

However societal attitudes lag behind: 40% of Azerbaijanis surveyed in 2012 still believed that agree that women should tolerate domestic violence in order to keep their family together, and 22% agreed that there are times when a woman deserves to be beaten. The 2006 renaming of the state Committee on Women's Issues as the State Committee on Family, Women and Children’s Affairs (SCFWCA) has also been interpreted by some as a protectionist approach that views women as vulnerable “reproductive units" rather than independent individuals.

In July 2021, women’s rights activists brought a coffin to the Interior Ministry to protest and raise awareness of the recent increase in domestic violence against women. Police detained three activists and removed the others from the area. The detainees were released soon after being detained.

According to Norwegian Helsinki Committee report in 2021 a growing number of domestic violence cases endangers women’s lives in Azerbaijan. The report namely "exposes serious gaps in the authorities’ response to domestic violence, including inadequate enforcement of existing legislation, and a failure to hold abusers accountable and ensure access to justice for survivors", highlighting that abuse is still widely perceived as a “family matter” and is underreported to police.

== Prostitution ==
Prostitution is an administrative offense rather than a crime and is punishable by a fine of up to $102 (88 AZN). Pimps and brothel owners may be sentenced to prison for up to six years.

== Timeline of women's emancipation ==
Note that this includes the period of time when Azerbaijan was a part of the Soviet Union, i.e.Azerbaijan Soviet Socialist Republic

Year	Event	Location
1889	Nigar Shikhlinskaya became the first Azerbaijani female to obtain a higher education.	Tiflis
1901	Empress Alexandra School, the first Azerbaijani secular girls' school and the first of such kind in the Russian Empire, opened.	Baku
1908	Saint Petersburg Women's Medical College graduate Sona Valikhan became the first certified Azerbaijani female physician.	Saint Petersburg
1908	Philanthropist Hamida Javanshir founded the first Azerbaijani coeducational school.	Kahrizli
1910	Actress Govhar Gaziyeva became the first Azerbaijani woman to appear on stage.	Tiflis
1911	Khadija Alibeyova published Ishig, the first Azerbaijani-language women's newspaper.	Tiflis
1912	The first Azerbaijani female opera singer Shovkat Mammadova made her first stage performance.	Baku
1919	Azerbaijani women were granted the right to vote.
1929	Izzet Orujova became the first Azerbaijani female actress to act in a feature film.
1930	Gynaecologist Adila Shakhtakhtinskaya became the first Azerbaijani woman to earn a doctoral degree.
1931	Leyla Mammadbeyova performed her first flight and became the first Azerbaijani female aviator.	Baku
1932	The first Azerbaijani ballerina Gamar Almaszadeh debuted in Shakh-Senem.	Baku
1938	People's Commissar of Justice Ayna Sultanova became the first Azerbaijani female cabinet minister.
1949	Biologist Valida Tutayug became the first Azerbaijani female member of the Azerbaijan National Academy of Sciences (founded in 1945).
1964	Sakina Aliyeva was elected Chair of the Supreme Soviet of Nakhchivan, becoming the first Azerbaijani female head of parliament.	Nakhchivan
1995	Azerbaijan ratified the Eradication of all Forms of Discrimination against Women from the UN Convention.
2007	Manzar Ismayilova became the first Azerbaijani female pastor.
2009	Natavan Mirvatova was promoted to major general, the third highest military rank in Azerbaijan and the highest a female has ever been elevated to.
2011	Shahla Ismail founded the Azerbaijani women’s parliament to increase the number of elected women.	Baku

== See also ==
- Women in Europe
- Women in Asia
