= Hijran Huseynova =

Azerbaijani politician and professor

Hijran Huseynova Hicrən Hüseynova
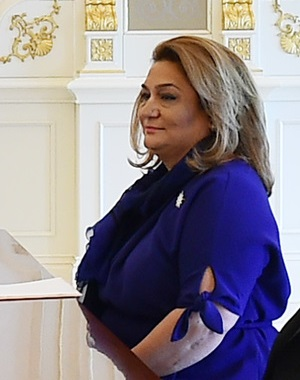

Chair of State Committee for Family, Women and Children Affairs of Azerbaijan Republic
- Incumbent
- Assumed office 6 February 2006
- President: Ilham Aliyev
- Preceded by: office established
- Succeeded by: Bahar Muradova

Personal details
- Born: 13 August 1955 (age 70) Baku, Azerbaijan SSR, Soviet Union

Hijran Kamran qizi Huseynova (Azerbaijani: Hicrən Hüseynova Kamran qızı; born 13 August 1955) is a professor and an Azerbaijani politician, serving as the Chairwoman of the State Committee for Family, Women and Children Affairs of Azerbaijan Republic.

== Biography ==
Hijran Huseynova was born in 1955 in the city of Baku. After completing her secondary education in 1972, Huseynova studied at the Department of History of Azerbaijan State University in Baku from 1972 to 1977. In 1977–1988, she worked as the History teacher at secondary school No. 189 in Baku.

In 1985, she obtained a PhD in History from Baku State University and in 2001, a PhD in Political Science. Since 1988, she has taught at Azerbaijan State University. From 2006, she is the professor and director of the Department of Diplomacy and Modern Integration Processes of Azerbaijan State University.

During the period of 2000-2006, she was the Dean of the International Law and International Relations department at Baku State University. From 2006, she is the professor and director of the Department of Diplomacy and Modern Integration Processes of Azerbaijan.

She was elected as a member of Milli Majlis at the Parliamentary elections held on 9 February 2020 and dismissed her post of Chairperson of State Committee on Family, Woman and Children Affairs in early March 2020 according to the Decree of the President Aliyev. During the first meeting of the sixth convocation of Milli Majlis, she was elected the head of the Committee on Family, Women, and Children.

== See also ==
- Cabinet of Azerbaijan
- Women in Azerbaijan
