= Nusrat Fatullayev =

Nusrat Fatullayev Nüsrət Fətullayev
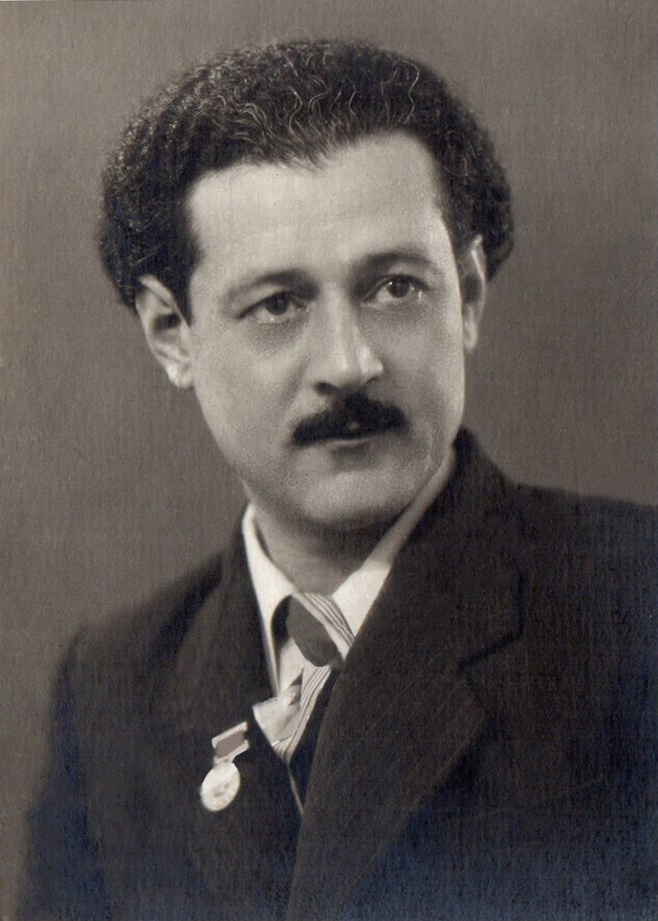

Chairman of the Union of Artists of Azerbaijan
- In office 1944–1946
- Preceded by: Ismayil Akhundov
- Succeeded by: Mursal Najafov

Personal details
- Born: May 29, 1913 Lankaran, Lenkoran uezd, Baku Governorate, Russian Empire
- Died: October 1, 1987 (aged 74) Baku, Azerbaijan SSR, USSR
- Spouse: Hokuma Gurbanova
- Children: Vafa Fatullayeva
- Education: Azerbaijan State Azim Azimzadeh Art School
- Occupation: painter
- Awards: Honored Art Worker of the Azerbaijan SSR State Prize of the Azerbaijan SSR Order of the Red Banner of Labour Order of the Badge of Honour
- Burial place: II Alley of Honor

Nusrat Mohsun oghlu Fatullayev (Azerbaijani: Nüsrət Möhsün oğlu Fətullayev, May 29, 1913 – October 1, 1987) was a stage designer, artist, People's Artiste of the Azerbaijan SSR (1949), and laureate of the State Prize of the Azerbaijan SSR (1972).

== Biography ==
Nusrat Fatullayev was born on May 29, 1913, in Lankaran. From 1930 to 1934, he studied at the Azerbaijan State Azim Azimzadeh Art School. In 1938, he was appointed the chief artist of the Azerbaijan National Drama Theatre, and he held that position until the end of his life.

He provided stage design for the comedy Hekayati Molla Ibrahim-Khalil Kimyagar (Mirza Fatali Akhundov, 1938) at the Azerbaijan State Theatre of Young Spectators, and for the operettas Arshin Mal Alan (Uzeyir Hajibeyov, 1972), Students' Trick (Rauf Hajiyev, 1940), and Young at Fifty Years Old (Zulfugar Hajibeyov, 1943) at the Azerbaijan State Academic Theatre of Musical Comedy. He worked as an artist for more than fifty plays, such as Almaz (Jafar Jabbarly, 1936), Vagif (Samad Vurgun, 1938), and Tahmina and Zaur (Anar, 1985) at the Azerbaijan State Drama Theater.

Nusrat Fatullayev died on October 1, 1987, in Baku. He was buried in the Second Alley of Honor.

== Awards ==
- People's Artiste of the Azerbaijan SSR: July 21, 1949
- Honored Art Worker of the Azerbaijan SSR: April 23, 1940
- Stalin Prize: 1948
- State Prize of the Azerbaijan SSR: April 27, 1972
- Order of the Red Banner of Labour: July 22, 1949
- Order of the Badge of Honour: February 25, 1946; June 9, 1959
