= Oryol Synagogue =

Synagogue in Oryol, Russia

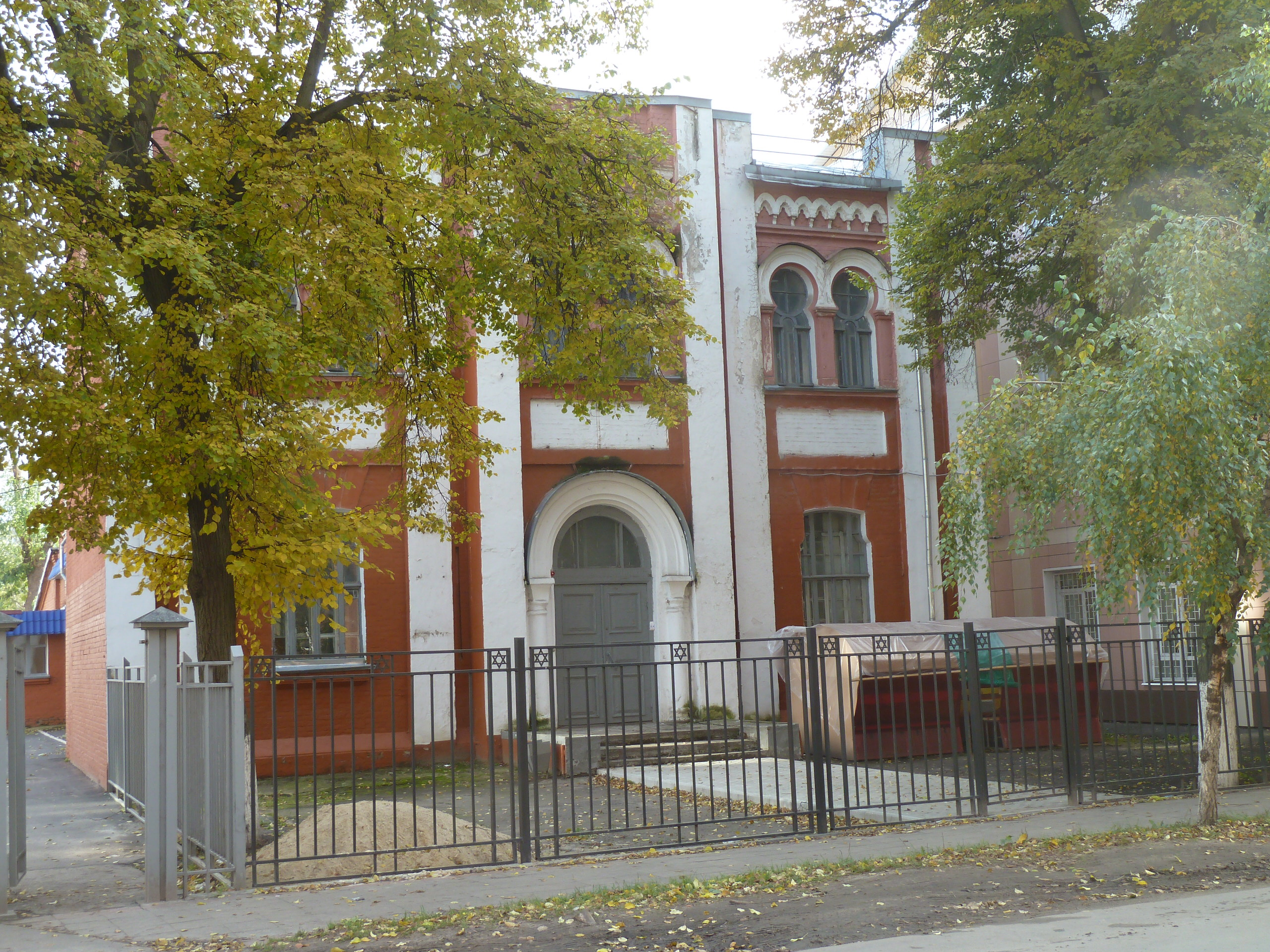

Religion
- Affiliation: Judaism
- Region: Oryol Oblast

Location
- Municipality: Oryol
- Country: Russia
- Interactive map of Oryol Synagogue
- Coordinates: 52.969769°N 36.075709°E

Oryol Synagogue (Russian: Орловская синаго́га) is a synagogue in Oryol, Oryol Oblast, Russia. It is the only synagogue in the region.

== History ==
In 1905, a Jewish mikveh, divided into male and female sections, was built on 2nd Nikitskaya Street (now Sovetskaya Street). Construction was completed in 1911 during Passover, and the official opening took place in 1912. Not far from the synagogue, a Jewish cemetery operated on the right bank of the Oka river from the 1840s (behind the gypsum factory along Moskovskoe Highway); it was closed in 1962. Over the years, various organizations were located here: a labor exchange, a fire department, a police station, a school, an Osoaviakhim flying club, a vocational school, and a road technical school. In 1945, a new synagogue was opened on Sacco and Vanzetti Street, which attracted up to 150 people on holidays.

In 1992, the Jewish religious community was reestablished. Following legal proceedings between the religious organization and the regional government, a settlement was reached in March 2016, and on November 21, the synagogue was returned to the Jewish community of Oryol Oblast. By the decision of the Small Council of the Oryol Regional Council of People's Deputies dated July 6, 1993, No. 81-7, the synagogue building was included in the unified state register of cultural heritage sites as a cultural heritage site of regional significance.
