= Vafa =

Vafa (Persian: وفا, lit. 'loyalty, faithfulness'; Azerbaijani: Vəfa) is both a given name and a surname, common to Iranian and Azerbaijani people. Notable people with the name include:

== People with the given name Vafa ==
- Vafa Fatullayeva (1945–1987), Azerbaijani actress
- Vafa Guluzade (1940–2015), Azerbaijani diplomat
- Vafa Hakhamaneshi (born 1991), Iranian footballer
- Vafa Huseynova (born 1988), Azerbaijani group rhythmic gymnast

== People with the surname Vafa ==
- Cumrun Vafa (born 1960), Iranian-American physicist
- Mahmoud Khosravi Vafa (born 1953), Iranian conservative politician

== See also ==
- Victorian Amateur Football Association (VAFA)
- Vafa Mortar
- Vafa–Witten theorem
