= A Family (1943 film) =

- Russian: Одна семья
- Directed by: Grigori Aleksandrov; Mikayil Mikayilov; Rza Takhmasib
- Written by: Aleksandr Stolper; Olga Ziv
- Starring: Mirza Babayev; Merziyye Davudova; O. Filippova; Hokuma Gurbanova; M. Jarikov
- Music by: Gara Garayev
- Release date: 1943
- Countries: Azerbaijani SSR, Soviet Union

A Family, (Russian: Одна семья) is a 1943 Soviet film directed by Grigori Aleksandrov, Mikayil Mikayilov and Rza Takhmasib It was banned from being released in theatres by Joseph Stalin's regime censorship, for "poorly reflecting the struggle of the Soviet people against the German fascist invader".

== Plot ==
A Family (1943)

The film depicts the heroic daily life of the people of Baku during the Great Patriotic War. It consists of three interconnected stories: an Azerbaijani tanker-shooter named Najaf, who is on leave, mistakenly arrives at the house of Sergeant Andrievsky instead of the captain's family. Despite the mix-up, the Andrievsky family warmly welcomes him. A romance develops between Najaf and the host's daughter. The stories shared by the characters form the narrative of the film.

== Starring ==
- Mirza Babayev
- Merziyye Davudova
- O. Filippova
- Hokuma Gurbanova
- M. Jarikov
- X. Malikov
- Alekper Melikov
- Lyubov Orlova
- V. Saripov
- Oleg Zhakov
- Kazim Ziya
