= Shahla Ismail =

- Born: 1976 (age 49–50); Baku
- Known for: founded the Azerbaijani women’s parliament

Shahla Ismail (Azerbaijani: Şəhla İsmayıl; born 1976) is an Azerbaijani human rights activist. She founded the Azerbaijani women’s parliament and she has been knighted for her work.

== Life ==
Ismail was born in 1976 in Baku. She gained a fellowship in 2005 from the UK based John Smith Trust which she believes was pivotal in developing her career.

Ismail founded the Azerbaijani women’s parliament in 2011, and that work was supported by UNDEF (United Nations Democracy Fund). Its purpose is to increase the number of women in the National parliament. She appeared in a United Nations video that was investigating cases where women were being allegedly forcibly evicted from their homes by speculators who wanted to join the country's property boom. The law was not offering those who were evicted any protection against the speculators who could arrange for homes to be demolished without any legal authority.

Ismail led the Women’s Association for Rational Development (WARD). Azerbaijan's Office for Serious Crimes began an investigation of WARD in September 2015. They banned her from travelling and they froze the organisation's bank account and Ismail's. Her organisation came under long term scrutiny but the investigation ended early in 2016.

She believes that men in her country have a feeling of supremacy. This can leave women feeling powerless. Suicide can be a last rational consequence of the "problems and barriers for women’s self-realization" in her country.

In 2018 her two decade contribution to women's rights was recognised. She was awarded the 2018 Bob Hepple Equality award by, Saphié Ashtiany, the Chair of the Equal Rights Trust.

She was at the French embassy in 2022 where she was knighted, she was awarded the National Order of France (Chevalier de l'Ordre National du Mérite) as the head of the Women for Rational Development society. In the following year she was awarded the People's Medal on International Women's Day after completing 25 years of service. In the same year she was given a "Progress" medal award by President Ilham Aliyev.

On a day when other activists were arrested, Ismail was detained in 2024. The people who arrested her tried to trick their way into her home and allegedly beat her nanny to gain access. She was taken away in her slippers and held till midnight.

In 2026 Ismail was named but not indicted in a case against Nargiz Mukhtarova who was accused of money laundering. Mukhtarova's work for a foreign organisation included conducting research on gender equality and women's rights.
