= Almaz (1936 film) =

- Directed by: Agharza Guliyev, Qriqori Braginski
- Written by: Jafar Jabbarly
- Screenplay by: Jafar Jabbarly
- Story by: Jafar Jabbarly
- Starring: Izzet Orujova; Hokuma Gurbanova; Hayri Amirzade; Alisattar Melikov; Alakbar Huseynzade; Ismail Hidayetzade; Panfiliya Tanailidi; Ali Gurbanov; Aziza Mammadova; Mirzeaga Aliyev; Alasgar Alakbarov; Ahmad Gamarlinski; Rza Tahmasib; Zeynab Kazimova
- Cinematography: İvan Frolov, Asgar Ismailov
- Music by: Niyazi, Zulfugar Hajibeyov
- Production company: Azərbaijanfilm
- Release date: 25 December 1936
- Running time: 65 min
- Country: Soviet Union
- Language: Silent (with Russian intertitles)

Almaz is a feature film directed by Ağarza Quliyev and Grigori Braginski in 1936. The film was produced by the Azerbaijan film studio. In this cinematic story, the young teacher Almaz comes to a village to work, where she faces obstacles and challenges on the path to the development and strengthening of the new social structure. The main roles in the film are played by Izzat Orujova, Hokuma Gurbanova, Hayri Amirzade, Alisattar Melikov, Alakbar Huseynzade. This film was included in the list of films declared as national heritage in Azerbaijan by the Decision No. 211 of the Cabinet of Ministers of the Republic of Azerbaijan dated May 7, 2019.

== Plot ==
The year is 1930 in a remote mountain village in Azerbaijan. A young teacher named Almaz (played by Izzat Orujova) arrives in the village to work, where she faces numerous obstacles and difficulties in promoting the development and strengthening of the new social order. At the same time, the village is going through a class struggle due to the process of collectivization. The challenging and conflicting times she navigates, along with the complex issues she encounters, shape the main storyline of the film.

== Cast ==
- Izzet Orujova as Almaz
- Hokuma Gurbanova as Yaxşı
- Hayri Amirzade as Kərim
- Alisattar Melikov as Barat
- Alakbar Huseynzade as Hacı Əhməd
- Ismail Hidayetzade as Şərif, the village council secretary
- Panfiliya Tanailidi as Fatmanisə
- Ali Gurbanov as Avtil
- Aziza Mammadova as Telli
- Mirzeaga Aliyev as Səməndər, the school principal
- Alasgar Alakbarov as Fuad
- Ahmad Gamarlinski as Balaoğlan, the chairman of the village council
- Rza Tahmasib as the doctor
- Zeynab Kazimova as a commission member

== Production ==
Originally, Jafar Jabbarly was supposed to direct this film. He had even completed all the preparatory work for the production. However, his sudden death left the project incomplete. Almaz became the last silent film in Azerbaijani cinema. The actors do not speak in the film, with dialogues presented through intertitles. The events are accompanied solely by music.

Crew

- Directors: Agharza Guliyev, Grigori Braginski
- Original Story and Scriptwriter: Jafar Jabbarly
- Cinematographers: Ivan Frolov, Esger Ismayilov
- Art Director: Viktor Aden
- Composers: Niyazi, Zulfugar Hajibeyov
