= Hokuma Gurbanova =

Azerbaijani and Soviet actress

- Hökümə Qurbanova
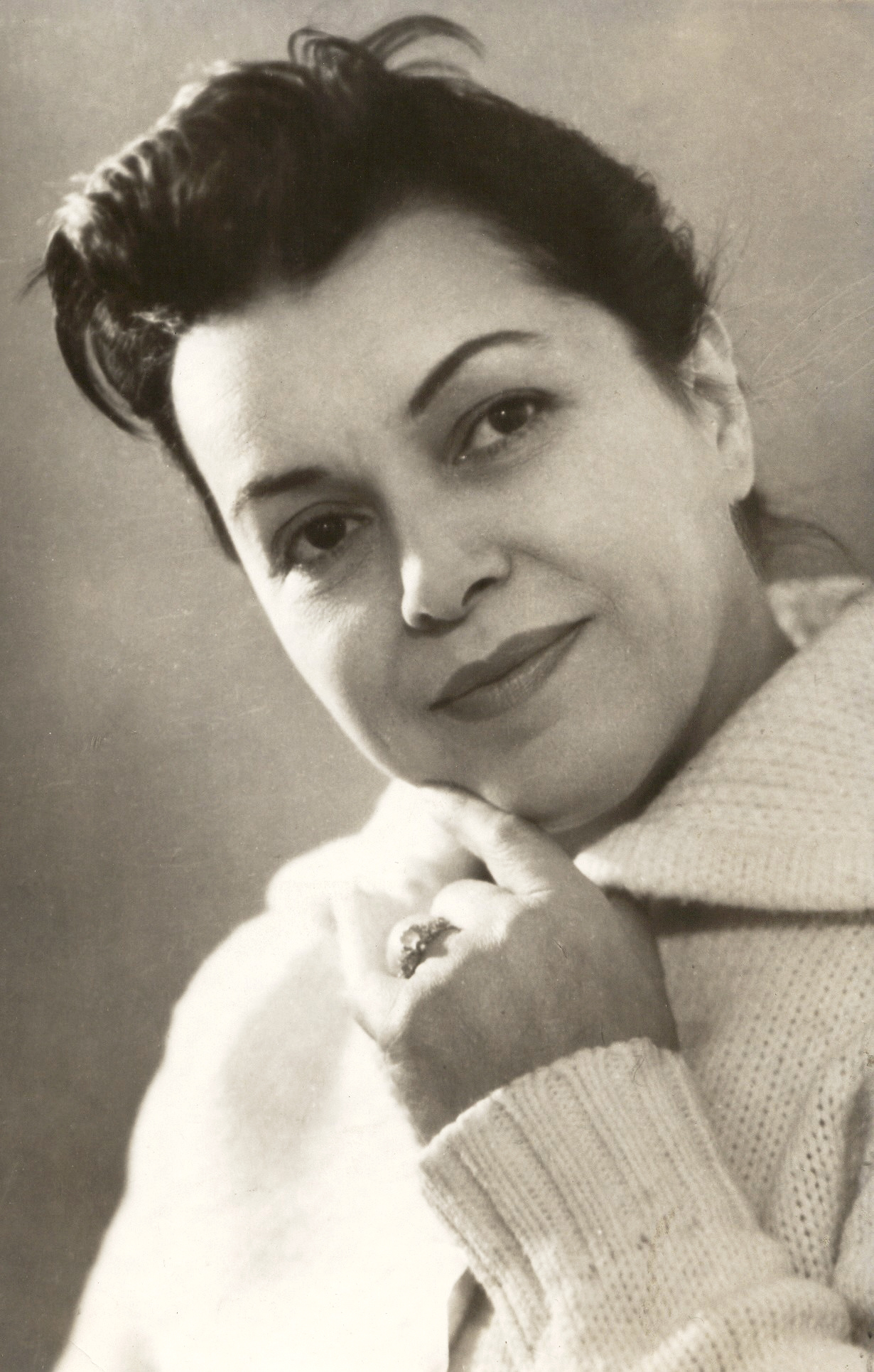
- Born: June 11, 1913; Baku, Caucasus Viceroyalty, Russian Empire (present-day Azerbaijan)
- Died: November 2, 1988 (aged 75); Baku, Azerbaijan SSR, Soviet Union
- Occupations: Film actress; stage actress
- Years active: 1933–1988

Hokuma Abbasali gizi Gurbanova (Note: Azerbaijani: Hökümə Abbasəli qızı Qurbanova; Russian: Окума Аббас кызы Курбанова, romanized: Okuma Abbas kyzy Kurbanova) (June 11, 1913 – November 2, 1988) was an Azerbaijani and Soviet stage and film actress who was born and died in Baku. People's Artist of the USSR (1965).

== Biography ==
Hokuma Gurbanova was born in Baku, Russian Empire. In 1931, she graduated from a pedagogical college in Baku. From 1931 to 1932, she studied piano at the Baku Academy of Music.

Gurbanova was briefly married to actor Alasgar Alakbarov and gave birth to a daughter, Naila. Gurbanova had another daughter, Vafa, also an actress, from her second marriage to stage decorator Nusrat Fatullayev.

Gurbanova's career as an actress began in 1933, at the Azerbaijanfilm studio, when she played the role of Yakhshi in one of the earliest Soviet Azerbaijani feature films Almaz, chosen for the role by screenwriter Jafar Jabbarly himself. From 1938, she performed in a troupe of Azerbaijan State Academic National Drama Theatre in various drama genres. Hokuma Gurbanova was a member of the Union of Cinematographers’ of the Azerbaijan SSR and member of the Supreme Soviet of the Azerbaijan SSR of the 7th and 8th convocations.

She died on November 2, 1988, in Baku and was buried in the Alley of Honor.

== Awards and titles ==
- People's Artist of the USSR (1965)
- Mirza Fatali Akhundov State Prize of the Azerbaijan SSR (1965)
- Order of Lenin (1959)
- Order of the Red Banner of Labour (1973)
- Order of the Badge of Honour (1949)

== Theatrical works ==
- Vagif by Samad Vurgun (first performance) – Tamara
- “Farhad and Shirin by Samad Vurgun – Shirin
- Javanshir by Mehdi Huseyn – Reyhan
- Bride of Fire by Jafar Jabbarly – Solmaz
- Bumpkin by Mirza Ibrahimov – Banovsha
- Antony and Cleopatra by Shakespeare – Cleopatra

== Filmography ==
- 1972 – Habib, Sovereign of Snakes
- 1967 – Man Drops Anchor – Shamana
- 1965 – Woolen Scarf
- 1962 – I Will Dance – Bikatu
- 1961 – The Life Teaches
- 1959 – Can He Be Forgiven?
- 1943 – A Family – Leyla
- 1936 – Almaz – Yakhshi

== See also ==
- List of People's Artistes of the Azerbaijan SSR
