= Mass voluntary society =

Type of Soviet Union organization

Mass voluntary societies (rus. Массовые добровольные общества) were a type of voluntary organization in the Soviet Union, which started appearing at beginning of the era of its New Economic Policy. Endorsed by the Communist Party of the Soviet Union and centred on single issues, they were intended to pull non-party members into Communist politics and to contribute to several aspects of Soviet state building which could not be solved by the party alone. Founded in 1927, the Society for the Assistance of Defense, Aircraft and Chemical Construction, or "Osoaviakhim" became the largest mass voluntary association in the country before World War II.

A lot of the societies were headed by the leaders of the Bolshevik Party; for example, the society named "Down with illiteracy" was headed by Mikhail Kalinin, while "The Union of Militant Atheists" was headed by Yemelyan Yaroslavsky. According to Gleb Albert, these organisations were useful to the Bolsheviks since they could both mobilize those who were sympathetic towards just individual aspects of the party programme and channel genuine enthusiasm into particular issues.

== See also ==
- Timurite movement
