= Kazim Ziya =

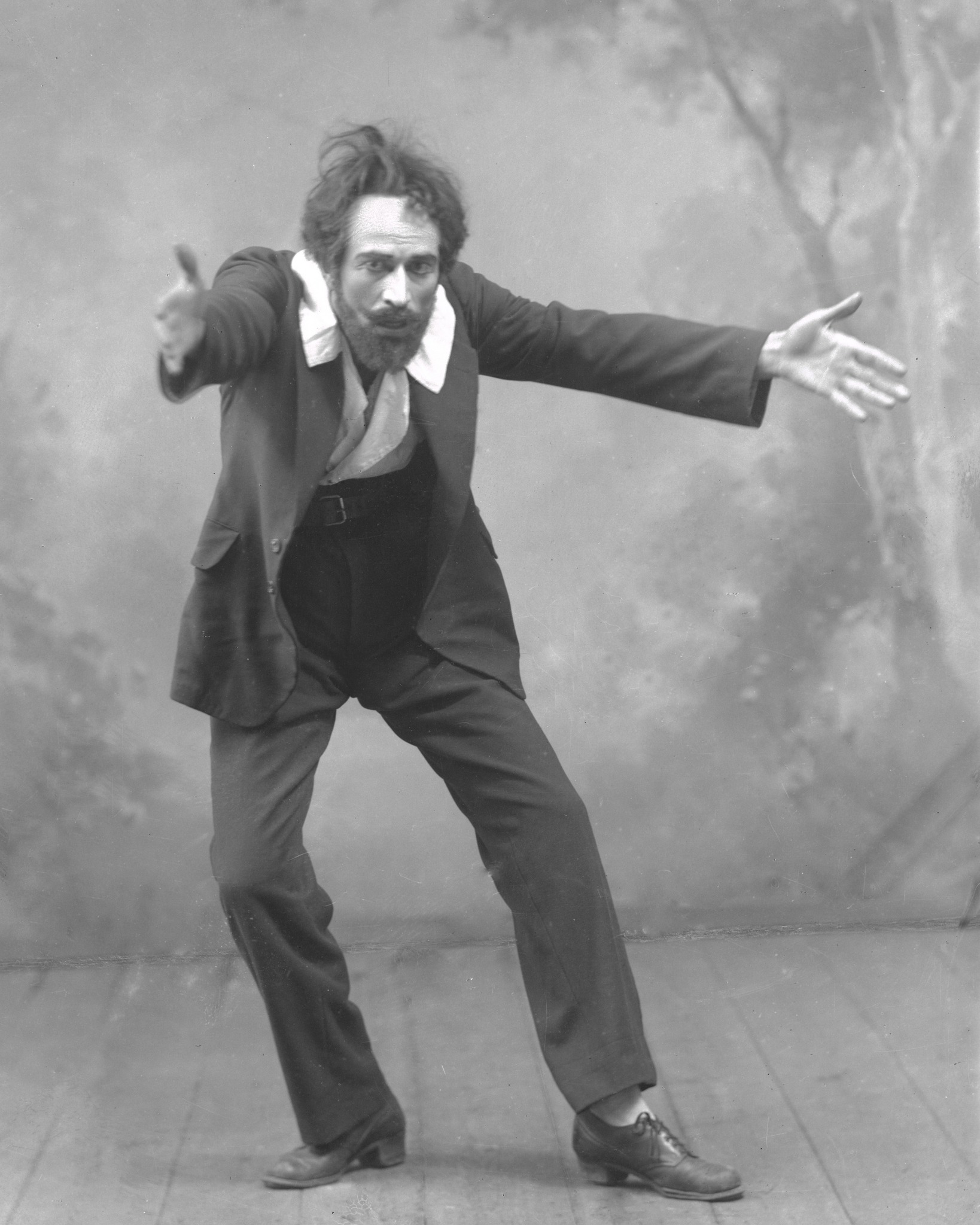
- In the role of Arif (tragedy "Iblis" by Huseyn Javid, 1922).
- Born: 21 March 1896; Ordubad, Nakhchivan, Azerbaijan
- Died: 20 November 1956 (aged 60); Baku, Azerbaijan
- Citizenship: Soviet Union; Azerbaijani Republic
- Occupation: Actor

Kazim Jafar oglu Ziya (Azerbaijani: Kazım Ziya; real surname Kazimzade; b. Ordubad, Nakhchivan; 1896 – d. Baku, Azerbaijan; 1956) was an Azerbaijani actor and translator.

== Life ==
Kazim Jafar oglu Ziya was an Azerbaijani and Soviet actor, director, and instructor at the Azerbaijan Theater Institute. He was honored as a People's Artist of the Azerbaijan SSR in 1943. From 1921, he worked at the Azerbaijan State Academic National Drama Theatre in Baku. He translated Lev Tolstoy's "The Living Corpse," Henrik Ibsen's "Pillars of Society," Vadim Sobko's "Behind the Second Front," and Alexandre Dumas's "The Bloody Castle" plays into the Azerbaijani language. In 1948, he was awarded the "Stalin Prize" as the laureate for his role in Anvar Mammadkhanli's play "Morning of the east".

Ordubad People's Theater has been named after him since 1964.

== Awards ==
- People's Artist of the Azerbaijan SSR (1943)
- Order of the Red Banner of Labour
- Stalin Prize (1948)

== Filmography ==
- The Legend of the Maiden Tower (1923)
- In the Name of God (1925)
- Sabuhi (1941)
- A Family (1943)
- Submarine "T-9" (1943)
- Fatali Khan (1947)
- Mahammad Fuzuli (1958)
