= Agharza Guliyev =

Azerbaijani-Soviet film director

- Born: December 22, 1898; Lankaran, Baku Governorate, Russian Empire
- Died: 15 September 1976 (aged 77); Azerbaijan Soviet Socialist Republic
- Occupations: Film director, screenwriter and actor

Agharza Samandar oglu Guliyev (Azerbaijani: Ağarza Səməndər oğlu Quliyev; b. 22 December 1898, Lankaran, Baku Governorate, Russian Empire – d. 15 September 1976, Baku, Azerbaijan Soviet Socialist Republic) was an Azerbaijani Soviet film director, screenwriter, and actor, Honored Artist of the Azerbaijan SSR (1960).

== Life ==
Agharza Guliyev was born on December 22, 1898, in the city of Lenkaran. In 1924, he graduated from the Azerbaijan Theater School.

He began his creative career in cinema as an actor in 1924. He appeared in films such as "The Owl" (1924), "Gilan's Daughter" (1929), "The Meeting" (1930), "First Komsomol" (1931), "People Without Hands" (1932), and others.

Starting from 1934, Agharza Guliyev began directing films himself. He played a significant role in establishing and developing Azerbaijani cinema. He became a member of the CPSU in 1946.

Agharza Guliyev directed films such as the short films "Son of the Motherland" (1941) and "Bakhtiyar" (1942), feature films "Friends" (1934), "Almaz" (1936), "New Horizon" (1941, both co-directed with Grigory Braginsky), "Black Cliffs" (1958), "Morning" (1960), "Ulduz" (1964), and "I Was Not a Beauty" (1968, co-directed with Tofik Tagizade and Ramiz Askerov).

Guliyev also directed several documentary films. In 1960, he was honored with the title of Honored Artist of the Azerbaijan SSR.

Agharza Guliyev died on September 15, 1976, in Baku.

== Sources ==
- Рашевской, Т (1980). Культура Советского Азербайджана. Baku: Азербайджанское государственное издательство.
- Кино (1987). гл. ред. С. И. Юткевич; редкол.: Ю. С. Афанасьев, В. Е. Баскаков, И. В. Вайсфельд и др. : Энциклопедический словарь. Moscow: Советская энциклопедия.
- Гулиева, Дж. Б. Гулиева (1979). Гулиjев Ағарза Cәмәндәр оғлу // Азәрбајҹан Совет Енсиклопедијасы. Baku: Главная редакция Азербайджанской советской энциклопедии.
