= Leyla Mammadbeyova =

Soviet aviator (1909–1989)

- Leyla Məmmədbəyova
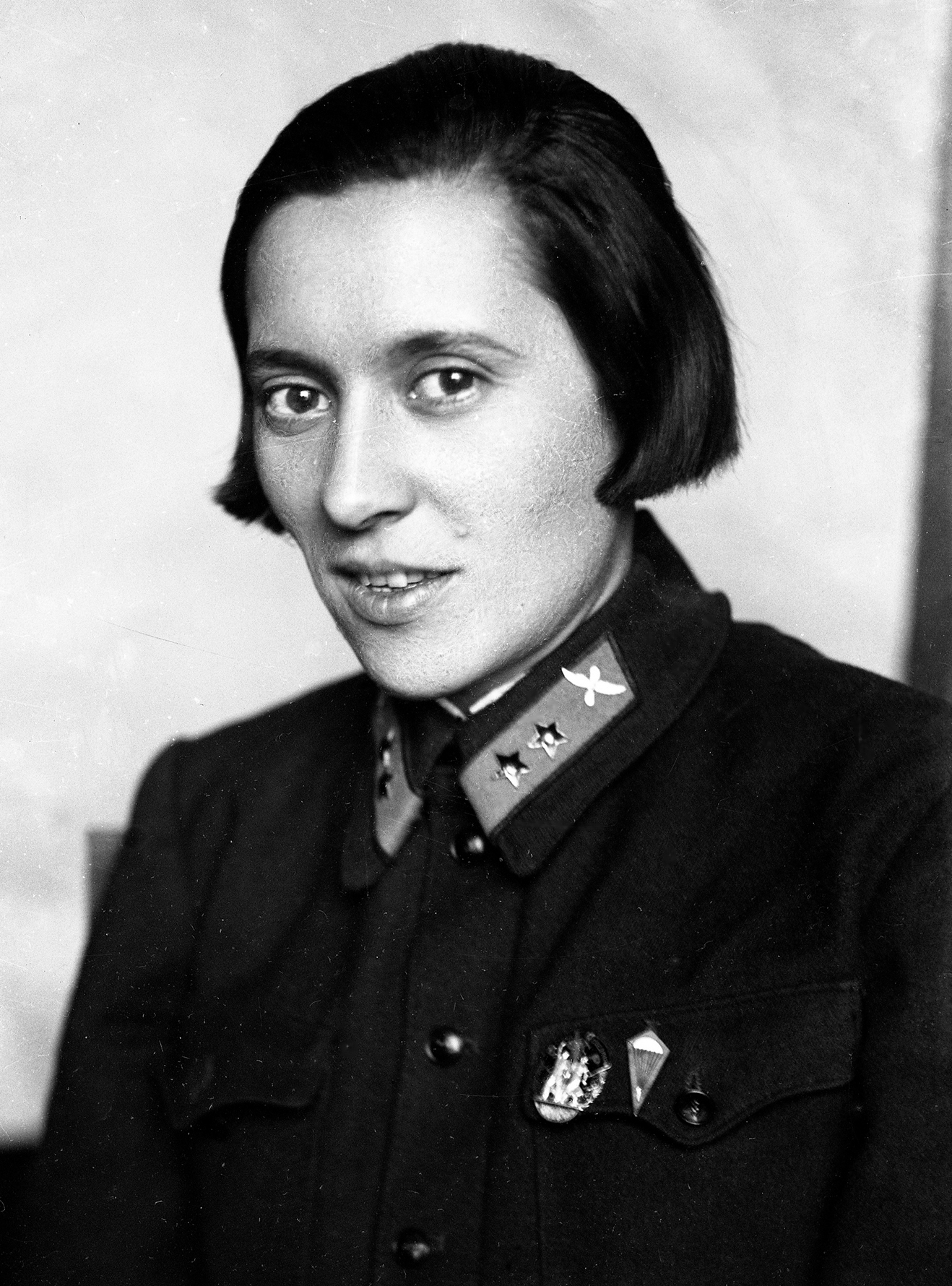
- Born: 17 September 1909; Baku, Russian Empire
- Died: 4 July 1989 (aged 79); Baku, Azerbaijan SSR, Soviet Union
- Occupation: Aviator
- Awards: Medal "For Distinguished Labour"; Order of the Badge of Honour

Leyla Alasgar gizi Mammadbeyova, née Zeynalova (Azerbaijani: Leyla Ələsgər qızı Məmmədbəyova; 17 September 1909 – 4 July 1989), was the first Azerbaijani female aviator. She is considered to be the first female Muslim pilot and parachutist and was also the first female pilot of Transcaucasia, of Southern Europe and of Southwest Asia.

== Career ==
Mammadbeyova's father Alasgar Zeynalov was the cousin of one of Azerbaijan's pioneer film actors, Huseyn Arablinski. Her family was arts-oriented, and as a teenager she could play the piano and the tar. At age 14, she married former landowner Bahram Mammadbeyov of Kurdakhany, who would go on to become chief of the Professional Unions Bank in Baku.

Mammadbeyova was trained as a professional aviator at the Baku Airclub and performed her first flight in 1931. She continued her education at an aviators school in Moscow in 1932. On 17 March 1933, Mammadbeyova became the second woman parachutist in the Soviet Union (after Nina Kamneva) having jumped from a Polikarpov Po-2 aeroplane at Moscow's Tushino Airfield. In 1934 she won the parachute jump competition held among representatives of the South Caucasus nations. By 1941 she was a Squadron Leader of the Soviet Army.

Mammadbeyova continued her career as a pilot and instructor at the Baku Airclub. She was not allowed to fly combat missions during World War II as at the time she was raising four children (she had six overall). Despite the Baku Airclub closing down due to war conditions, Mammadbeyova managed to launch glider and parachutist courses of her own, where she trained hundreds of combat pilots and around 4,000 paratroopers. Two of her students later became Heroes of the Soviet Union. Mammadbeyova performed her last flight in 1949 and worked as vice-chair of the DOSAAF's Baku branch until 1961.

Mammadbeyova's elder son Firudin fought in World War II, and her younger son Khanlar took part in the First Nagorno-Karabakh War, both as combat pilots.

Leyla Mammadbeyova became a living icon while still in her twenties. Her courage and skills were celebrated through media and the arts. Her character inspired the literary works of Mikayil Mushfig (Afshan, 1933 and Shoyla, 1934) and Samad Vurgun (Leyla, 1935), as well as the movie Ismat (dir. Mikayil Mikayilov, 1934). In the latter, Mammadbeyova appeared as a stuntwoman, having performed in plane operating scenes. In 1995 a documentary on Mammadbeyova's life and career entitled Leyla and directed by Nazim Rza Israfiloglu was released by Azerbaijantelefilm.
