= Natavan Gadimova =

Nakhchivan politician

- Natəvan Qədimova

Minister for Culture
- President: Vasif Talibov
- Preceded by: Sarvan Ibrahimov

Deputy Minister for Culture and Tourism

Natavan Gadimova, also Natavan Tofig gizi Gadimova (in Azerbaijani: Natəvan Qədimova) is a politician who is the minister for culture and tourism for the Nakhchivan Autonomous Republic, an exclave of Azerbaijan. She was appointed on 24 April 2018. Her predecessor was as minister was Sarvan Ibrahimov. Prior to her appointment as minister, she served as deputy minister for culture and tourism. However, on the same day as her appointment, a ministerial decree separated the ministry into two. In 2018, she made a speech at the closing ceremony for the event 'Nakhchivan: Capital of Islamic Culture - 2018'.
