= Osoaviakhim =

Soviet civil defense organization (1927–1948)

- Society for the Assistance of Defense, Aircraft and Chemical Construction (Osoaviakhim)
- Общество содействия обороне, авиационному и химическому строительству (Осоавиахим)
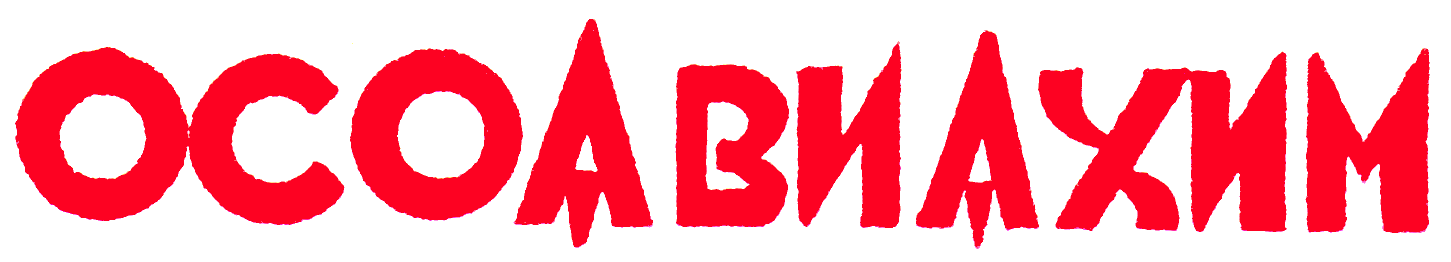
- Formation: 1927
- Dissolved: 1948
- Type: Public organization

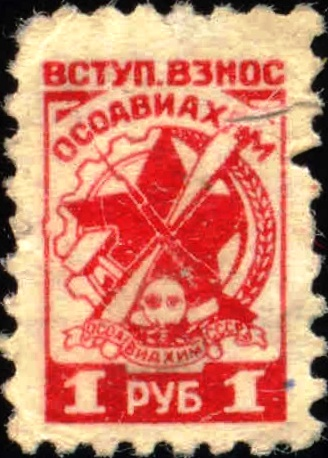
Stamp of Osoaviakhim

The Society for the Assistance of Defense, Aircraft and Chemical Construction (Russian: Общество содействия обороне, авиационному и химическому строительству, romanized: Obshchestvo sodeystviya oborone, aviatsionnomu i khimicheskomu stroitelstvu), commonly abbreviated as Osoaviakhim (Осоавиахим), was a mass voluntary society in the Soviet Union from 1927 to 1948. It was established with the goal of propagating civil defense training among the civilian population and of garnering popular support for Soviet Armed Forces. Starting with three voluntary societies for support to aviation, chemistry, and civil defense, it quickly branched out in several other directions, including mailer pigeon and military-service dog sections. The Osoviakhim was the largest mass voluntary society in the Soviet Union before and during World War II until it was dissolved in 1948 and split into three successor organizations, which were reunited in 1951 to form the similar DOSAAF.

== History ==
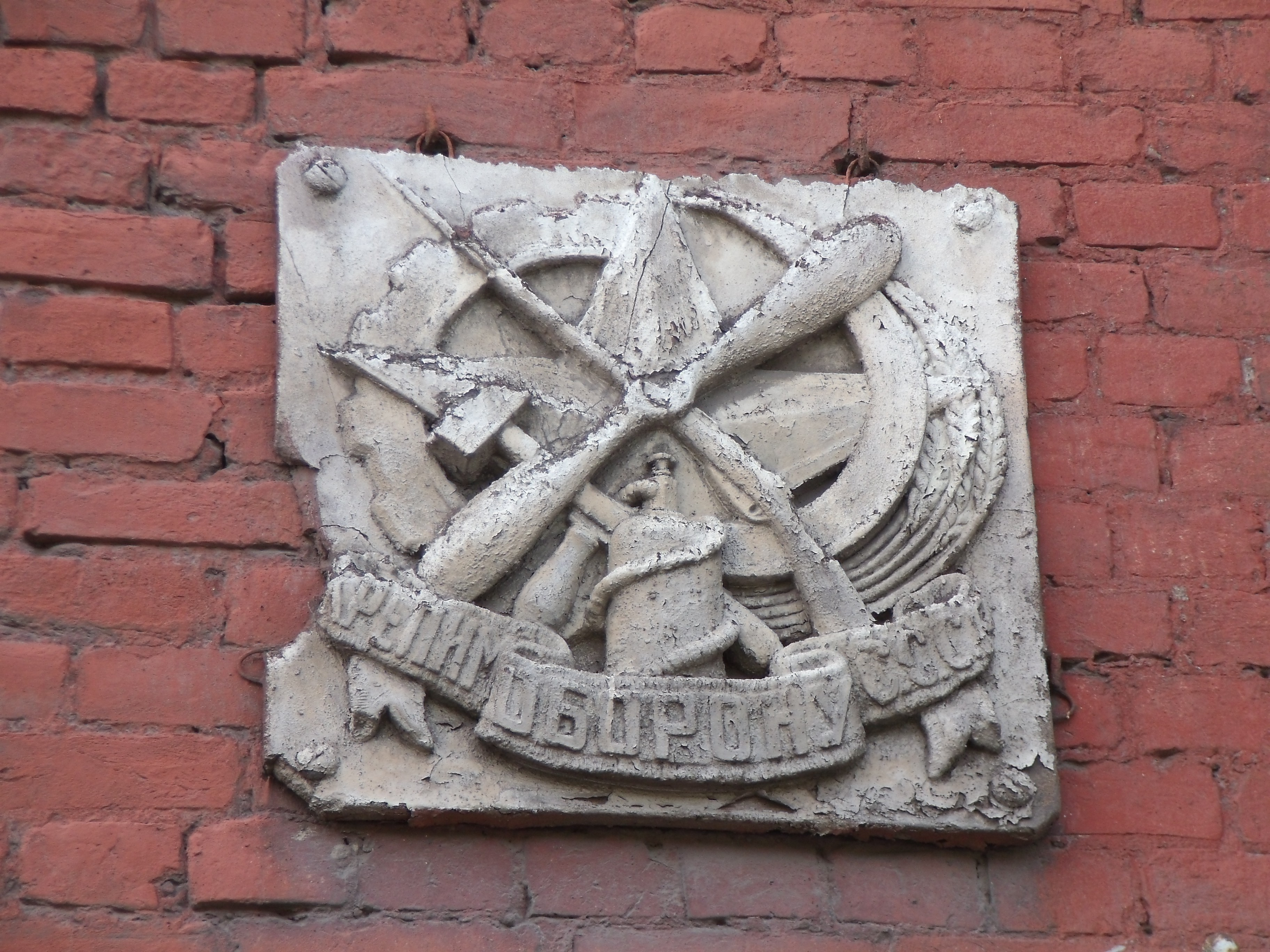
Osoaviakhim emblem bas-relief on a building with the phrase "Strengthen the Defense of the Soviet Union"

The Military Scientific Society was created in 1920 as a voluntary defense organization in the Russian Socialist Federative Soviet Republic during the Russian Civil War. This would later be renamed the Society for the Assistance of the Defense of the Soviet Union (OSO). A few years later, in the summer of 1925, the Aviakhim society was formed through the merger of the Society of Friends of the Air Fleet and the Society of Friends of Chemical Defense and the Chemical Industry (Dobrokhim).

On 23 January 1927, at the joint meeting of the First All-Union Congress of Aviakhim and the Second Plenary Session of the Central Council of OSO, on the report of the People's Commissar for Military and Naval Affairs Kliment Voroshilov, it was decided to merge the two societies into one under the name Aviakhim-OSO. Over time, it was renamed to the "Society for Assistance to the Defense and Aviation-Chemical Construction of the Soviet Union", abbreviated Osoaviakhim of the Soviet Union.

On 10 February 1927, Osoaviakhim's first conference took place in Moscow.

In 1931, the All-Union Physical Culture Complex program "Ready for Labour and Defense of the Soviet Union" was introduced in the country.

In 1932, at Moscow Aviation Plant No. 22, the Soviet Union's first public aviation school was created by the Osoaviakhim and Komsomol organizations, which trained pilots and other aviation specialists for the job. It had six sections: flight, glider, aircraft engine, parachute, glisser, model aircraft, and a group for the design and construction of sports aircraft.

On 29 October 1932, the Presidium of the Central Council of Osoaviakhim of the Soviet Union and the Russian Socialist Federal Soviet Republic approved the provision on the creation of the title Voroshilov Shooter, and on 29 December 1932, the badge Voroshilov Shooter. The magazine Voroshilov Shooter started publication.

In 1933, the first parachute squad was created at Krasnaya Presnya in the Bolshevik confectionery factory, which laid the foundation for mass parachuting in the country. At the factory Red Manufactory, the country's first female parachute sanitary squad was organized, which included 20 employees of the All-Union Central Council of Trade Unions, the Central Committee of the All-Union Leninist Communist Youth Union, and the Central Council of Osoaviakhim. The squad and factory received the collective title and sign "Fortress of Defense". It was awarded to teams of factories and factories, which, with the successful implementation of production plans, achieved widespread youth engagement in military affairs and the development of physical education.

On 10 March 1934, the Central Council of Osoaviakhim approved the new regulation on the Voroshilov Shooter badge, establishing the 1st and 2nd classes, and in July of the same year, the regulation on the Young Voroshilov Shooter badge.

In April 1934, the first title "Fortress of Defense" was awarded to the Valerian Kuybyshev Electric Plant, whose Osoaviakhim organization achieved high performance in its activities.

In the autumn of 1934, the first club of Voroshilov Shooters opened in the Bauman district. This club was honored to represent the Defense Society for the first time at international competitions – the teams of the Voroshilov Riflemen Club and the team of the Portsmouth Rifle Club of the United States met. Muscovites won against American shooters by 207 points.

On 13 August 1934, Moscow sportswoman Nina Kámneva made a record parachute jump. She left the plane at an altitude of 3,000 metres and opened her parachute 200 metres from the ground.

On 20 September 1934, in the newspaper of the Defense Society, On Guard, published the standards of the complex "Ready for Air Defense and Chemical Defense".

On 19 November 1935, the Presidium of the Central Council of Osoaviakhim approved the Regulation on the primary organization of Osoaviakhim.

In the summer of 1936, the Central Council of Osoaviakhim, taking into account the massive nature of the work on passing the standards "Ready for Air Defense and Chemical Defense", introduced the standards "Ready for Air Defense and Chemical Defense" of the 2nd class.

On 1 August 1936, the standards "Ready for Air Defense and Chemical Defense" for the Voroshilov Shooter badge of the 2nd stage required the use of a combat rifle. At the first All-Union shooting competitions of pioneers and schoolchildren – young Voroshilov shooters and Muscovites were the first in the team standings.

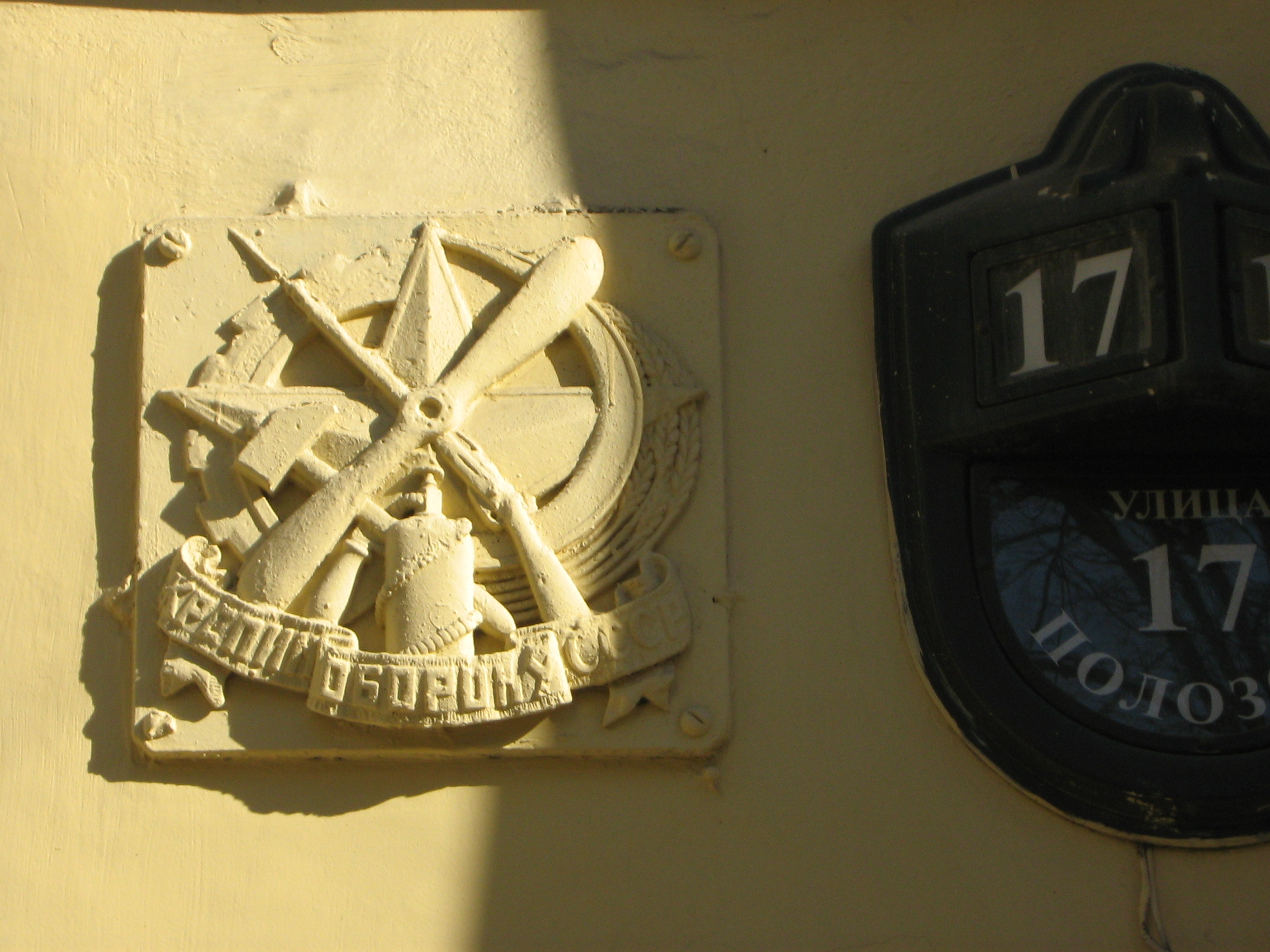
The sign of Osoaviakhim on the facade of house 17 on Polozov street in Saint Petersburg.

On 28 January 1937, the Presidium of the Central Council of Osoaviakhim introduced standards for the collective mark "Ready for Air Defense and Chemical Defense" for the primary organizations of the Residential Home Society, and at the beginning of next year, the standards for primary Osoaviakhim organizations of educational institutions were approved. The sign was wall-mounted and hung on the facades of buildings. The first organization in Moscow to pass "Ready for Air Defense and Chemical Defense" was the Institute of Cooperative Trade.

On 8 May 1938, Moscow Osoaviakhim member Mikhail Zyurin set the first world record of Soviet aircraft models that was officially recognized by the International Aviation Federation. His model, equipped with a gasoline engine, flew 21.857 km in a straight line.

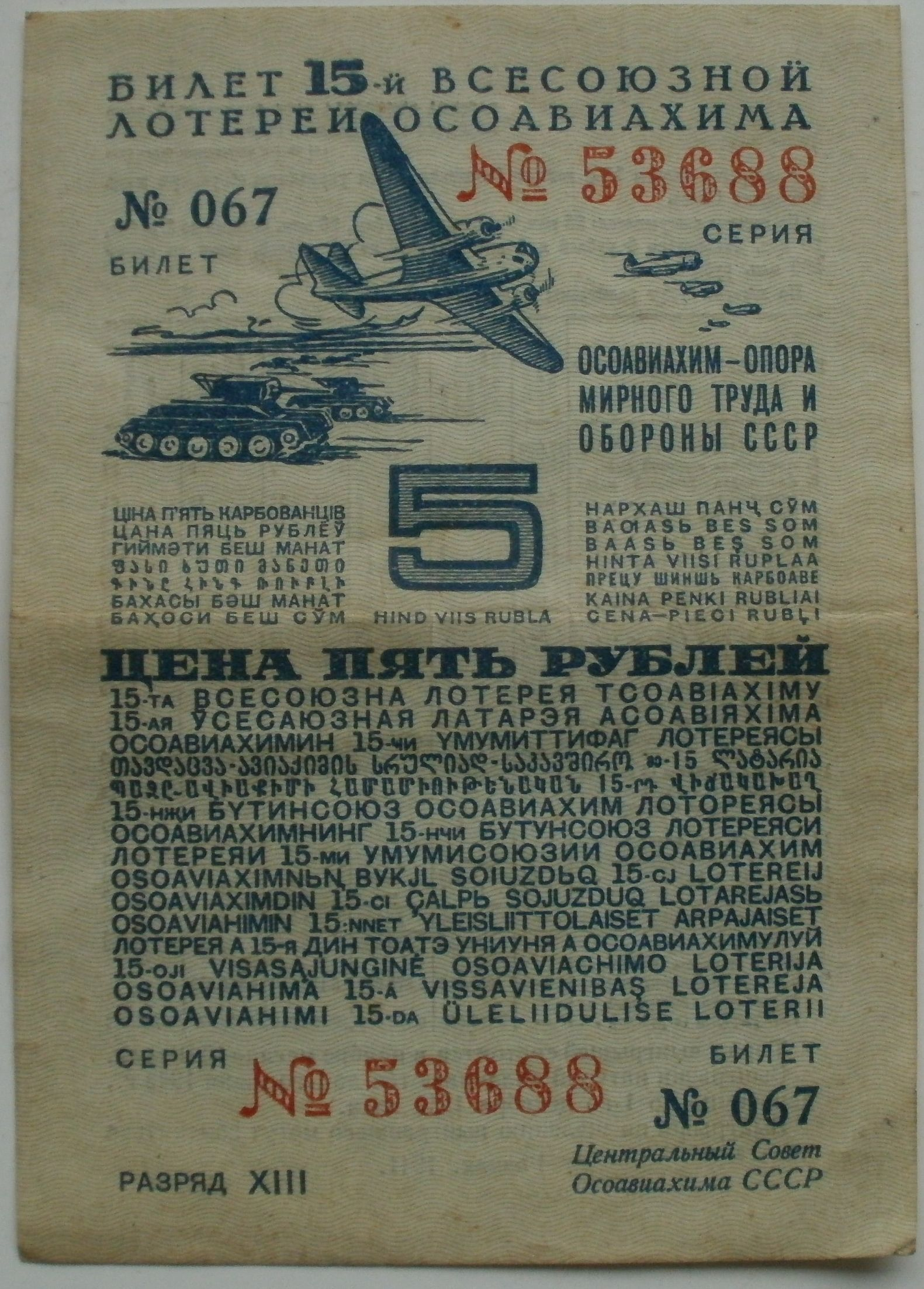
Osoaviakhim Lottery Ticket, 1941

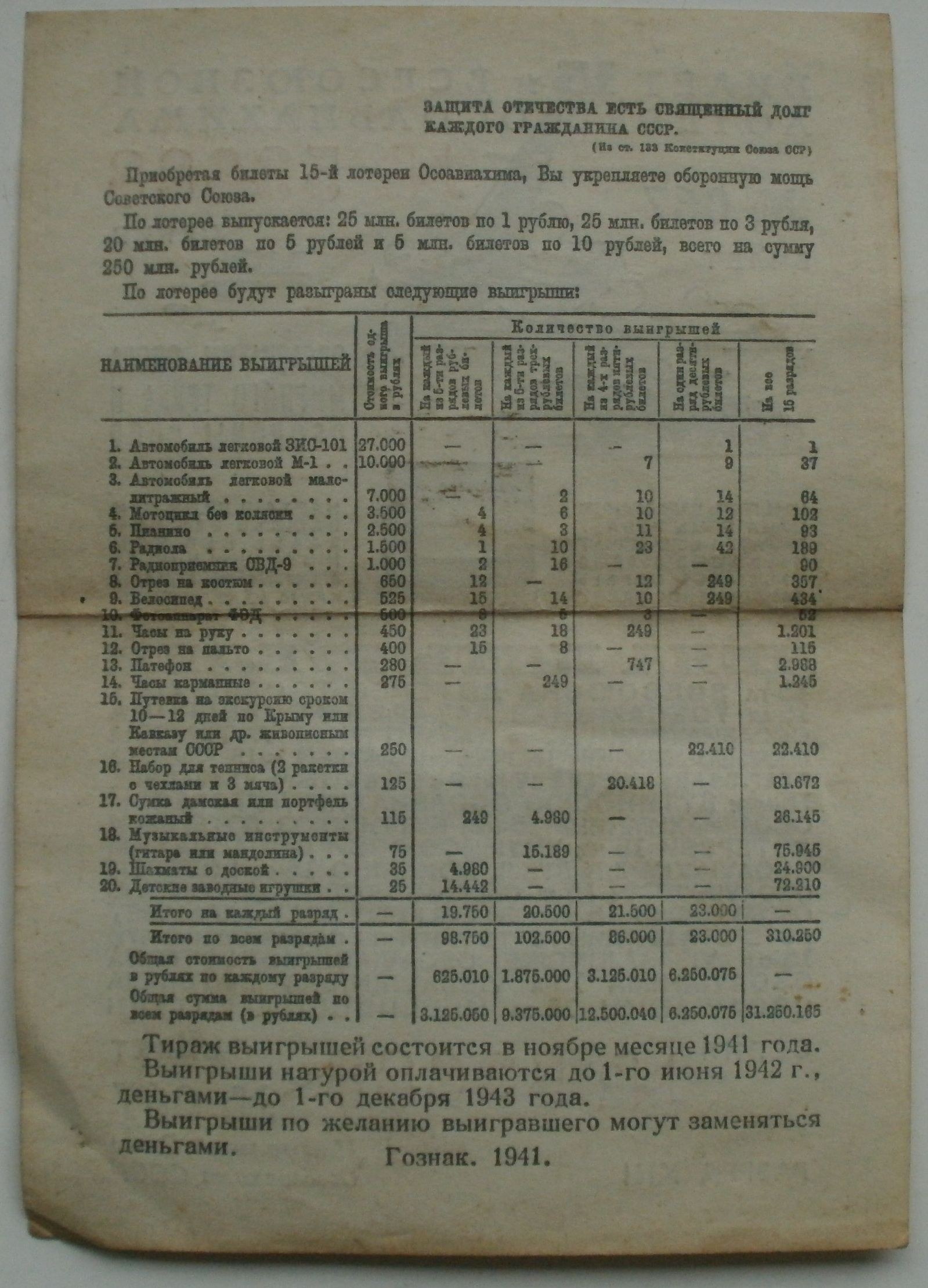
Osoaviakhim Lottery Ticket. The reverse side of the lottery

In 1939, the Osoaviakhim in Moscow had 23 regional organizations of the Society, a record-glider detachment, the Rostokinsky regional glider club, Baumansky, Leningradsky, Leninsky, Oktyabrsky, Proletarsky, Sverdlovsky, Stalinsky, Tagansky regional flying clubs, aero club Mosmetrostroy, city air and chemical Defense school, city maritime school, city rifle school, and the Osoaviakhim camps "Cheryomushki", "Veshnyaki", "Pushkinskoe".

On 27 August 1940, the Central Council of Osoaviakhim adopted a decree: "On the Restructuring of Military Training of the Members of Osoaviakhim". The transition from a circle system to classes in training units began. Groups, teams, and squads were created.

In 1939–1940, 3,248 self-defense groups were trained in the Osoaviakhim organizations of Moscow, 1,138 air defense and anti-chemical defense posts were created, 6,000 commanders of self-defense posts and groups were assigned. In 1940, over 770 thousand residents of the city were prepared for air defense and chemical defense.

At the beginning of 1941, in Moscow there were more than 4,000 groups, over 100 teams, and about 230 detachments in the Osoaviakhim. They trained 81 thousand people.

In June 1941, in Moscow, there were 6,790 primary organizations of Osoaviakhim and 860 thousand members of the Society.

In July 1941, the Council of People's Commissars of the Soviet Union charged Osoaviakhim with the responsibility to organize universal mandatory preparation of the population for air defense.

On 17 September 1941, the Resolution of the State Defense Committee, "On Universal Compulsory Military Education of Citizens of the Soviet Union" (16 to 50 years old), was issued.

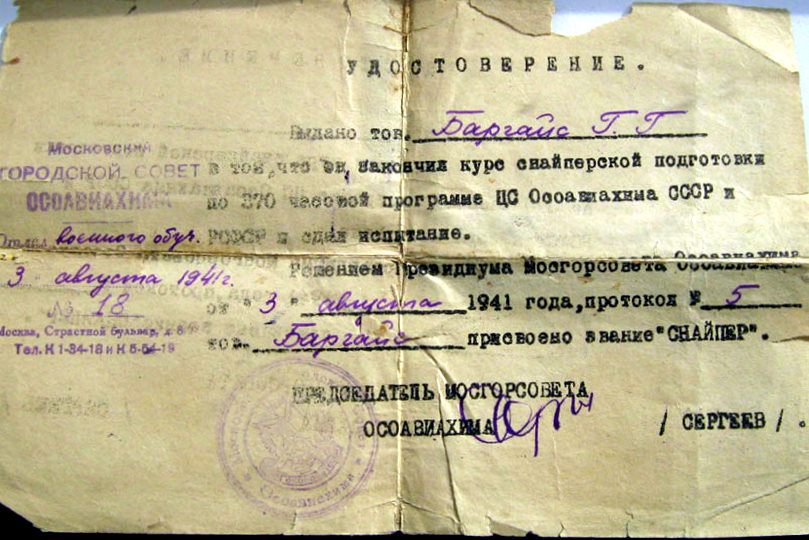
The Osoaviakhim certificate was issued in 1941 to the 16-year-old defender of Moscow, Harry Bargais, about the completion of the sniper course

In October–November 1941, training and shooting centers and shooting clubs were established in Krasnopresnensky, October, Pervomaisk, Stalin and Tagansky districts.

In January 1942, training and shooting centers were deployed in all regional organizations of the Society. Over the course of the year, over 25,000 specialists were trained – machine gunners, snipers, tank destroyers, and Voroshilov riflemen. Each training and shooting center had a summer and winter camp, a firing range with a shooting distance of at least 800 m, a ski base, training fields, engineering and sapper towns, and training rooms. The main base of training and shooting centers of the Moscow city organization of Osoaviakhim were Mytishchi and Rumyantsev training grounds meeting the above requirements.

At the beginning of 1943, the primary organizations of Osoaviakhim began to create units, platoons, companies, and battalions, which became the main organizational form of military training and military education of citizens.

In 1941–1945, during World War II, the following educational and sports organizations of the city council of Osoaviakhim operated in Moscow: 1st and 2nd training and shooting centers, sniper school, naval school, 1st, 2nd and 3rd air defense and chemical defense schools, 1st and 2nd communication schools, car club, a central communications school, radio House, glider club, cavalry school, service dog club, and the Mytishchi and Rumyantsev training grounds. The Osoaviakhim in Moscow trained more than 383 thousand military specialists, including snipers – 11,233, signalmen – 6,332, easel machine gunners – 23,005, manual machine gunners – 42,671, submachine gunners – 33,102, mortar men – 15,283, tank destroyers – 12,286, and armored gunners – 668. The service dog breeding club raised, trained, and transferred 1,825 service dogs to the Red Army. More than 3 million Muscovites received training in air defense and chemical defense at Osoaviakhim organizations. Moscow Osoaviakhim members raised 3,350,000 rubles of funds for a convoy of KV tanks and more than 1 million rubles for the construction of six Ilyushin Il-2 attack aircraft. The activities of the Moscow's Osoaviakhim during the Great Patriotic War were highly appreciated by the Central Council of the Special Meeting, which awarded it with the Red Banner that was forever left in the capital's organization of the Society.

At the beginning of 1945, in Moscow, in the constantly operating formations of Osoaviakhim, there were 183 companies that consolidated into 41 battalions.

In 1946, the Moscow City Shooting Sports Club was established.

On 1 April 1947, the 1st, 2nd and 3rd city flying clubs were established.

On 20 May 1947, the Moscow City Radio Club was established.

In 1947, four auto clubs were formed to train specialists for the Armed Forces – Dzerzhinsky, Kiev, Kuibyshevsky, Proletarsky.

On 16 January 1948, by Decree of the Council of Ministers No. 77, Osoaviakhim was divided into three voluntary societies – the Voluntary Society for the Assistance to the Army, the Voluntary Society for the Assistance to Aviation, and the Voluntary Society for the Assistance to the Fleet.

In 1948, the first Moscow city conferences of the Voluntary Army Assistance Society, the Voluntary Aviation Assistance Society, and the Voluntary Fleet Assistance Society were held on 26, 28, and 29 June. The 1st and 2nd naval clubs and the city naval training center worked in Moscow.

Since 1951, Osoaviakhim was renamed to the All-Union Voluntary Society for Assisting the Army, Aviation and Navy – DOSAAF.

== Executives ==
- Alexei Rykov;
- Joseph Unshlikht (January 1927 – 1932);
- Robert Eideman (1932–1937);
- Pavel Gorshenin (May 1937–November 1938);
- Pavel Kobelev (1938–1948);
  - Vasily Kuznetsov (Voluntary Army Assistance Society);
  - Nikolay Kamanin (Voluntary Aviation Assistance Society);
  - Alexander Nikolaev (Voluntary Fleet Assistance Society).

== Rank insignia ==
Position	Air and Land activities (collar patch)			Maritime activities (sleeves)
Position	1932	1936	1937	1936
Employees				n/a
Junior instructor				
Instructor				
Senior instructor				
Chief instructor				

Captains and lieutenants seconded to Osoaviakhim wore two stars, majors, lieutenant colonels and colonels three stars.
Light blue = air. Dark blue = equestry. Black = chemical protection. Crimson = rifle. Crimson also = Osoaviakhim's own administration.
