= Nina Kamneva =

Soviet athlete and military engineer

- Kamneva in 1934
- Born: 1916; Russian Empire
- Died: 1973 (aged 56–57); Moscow, Soviet Union
- Awards: Order of Lenin

Nina Alekseevna Kamneva (Russian: Нина Алексеевна Камнева; 1916 – 1973) was a Soviet athlete and military engineer. She was best known for breaking the world record for a free fall parachute jump in 1934.

== Biography ==
Kamneva was a military engineer who finished her career with the rank of Colonel. Kamneva was born in 1916 in the Russian Empire. She attended the Moscow Central Institute of Physical Education. Interested in skydiving Kamneva became one of the first instructors in the Central School of Osoaviakhim, with Tamara Ivanova and Lyuba Berlin. In 1933 at the Túshino Aerodrome she was the first woman to jump from a Polikarpov Po-2 aircraft. On 13 August 1934, she broke the women's world record for free fall. Kamneva jumped from 2,750 meters only opening the parachute at 250 meters up. She was in free fall for 58 seconds. Kamneva was the first skydiver to be awarded the title of "USSR Skydiving Master". She completed her studies at the Zhukovsky Military Air Academy and worked as a paratrooper trainer for Soviet army personnel at the Chkalov Academy.

She died in 1973, in Moscow, in the Soviet Union.
