= State Committee for Family, Women and Children Affairs (Azerbaijan) =

State Committee for Family, Women and Children Affairs of Azerbaijan Republic
- Azərbaycan Respublikasının Ailə, Qadın və Uşaq Problemləri üzrə Dövlət Komitəsi
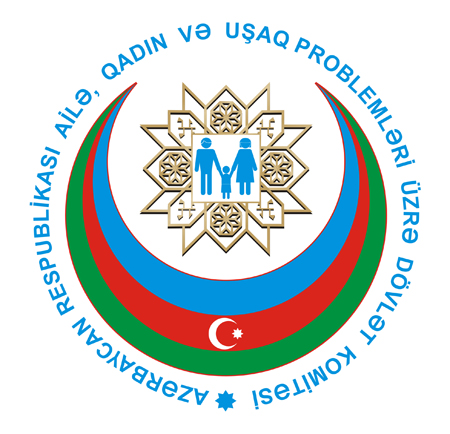
- Coat of Arms of Azerbaijan

Agency overview
- Formed: February 6, 2006
- Headquarters: 40 Uzeyir Hajibeyov Street, Government House, Gate III, Baku, Azerbaijan Republic AZ1000
- Agency executives: Bahar Muradova, Chair; Aynur Sofiyeva, Deputy Chair
- Website: www.scfwca.gov.az

The State Committee for Family, Women and Children Affairs of Azerbaijan Republic (Azerbaijani: Azərbaycan Respublikasının Ailə, Qadın və Uşaq Problemləri üzrə Dövlət Komitəsi) is a governmental agency within the Cabinet of Azerbaijan in charge of regulation of activities for the protection of rights of women and children and overseeing activities of non-governmental organizations involved in family in Azerbaijan Republic. The ministry is headed by Bahar Muradova.

== History ==
On January 14, 1998, the State Committee on Women’s Affairs was established by Presidential Decree. On February 6, 2006, the committee expanded with additional duties for the solution of problems of families and children, thus being re-established as the State Committee for Family, Women, and Children Affairs. Since its inception, the committee has promoted independence of women in civil societies in terms of earning for living and functioning while the lead family providers are away.

== Structure ==
In close cooperation with NGO Alliance for Children Rights, the committee has worked on combating domestic violence in the democratic society, an education campaign conducted among the children needed in special care for prevention of violence, suicide attempts, human trafficking, children's crimes, exploitation of child labor, early marriages, and harmful habits, as well as for getting the religious knowledge'.

== Activity of the Committee ==
Support centers for families and children were established in Mingachevir, Goranboy and Shuvalan with the financial support of the US Agency for International Development (USAID). At the center, young boys and girls are educated about health; they develop social communication skills and life skills. To date, thousands of children, young people, and parents have been serving in all centers.

The State Program on the Delivering Children from Children's State Institutions to Children (De-institutionalization) and Alternative Care State in Azerbaijan was approved by presidential decree No. 1386 dated March 29, 2006.

Juvenile justice reform is supported by the UNICEF office in Baku. Adaptation of refugee children to society and improvement of their well-being are the third priority direction in the field of child protection.

== See also ==
- Cabinet of Azerbaijan
- Women in Azerbaijan
