= Bahar Muradova =

Azerbaijani politician (born 1962)

- Bahar Avaz qızı Muradova
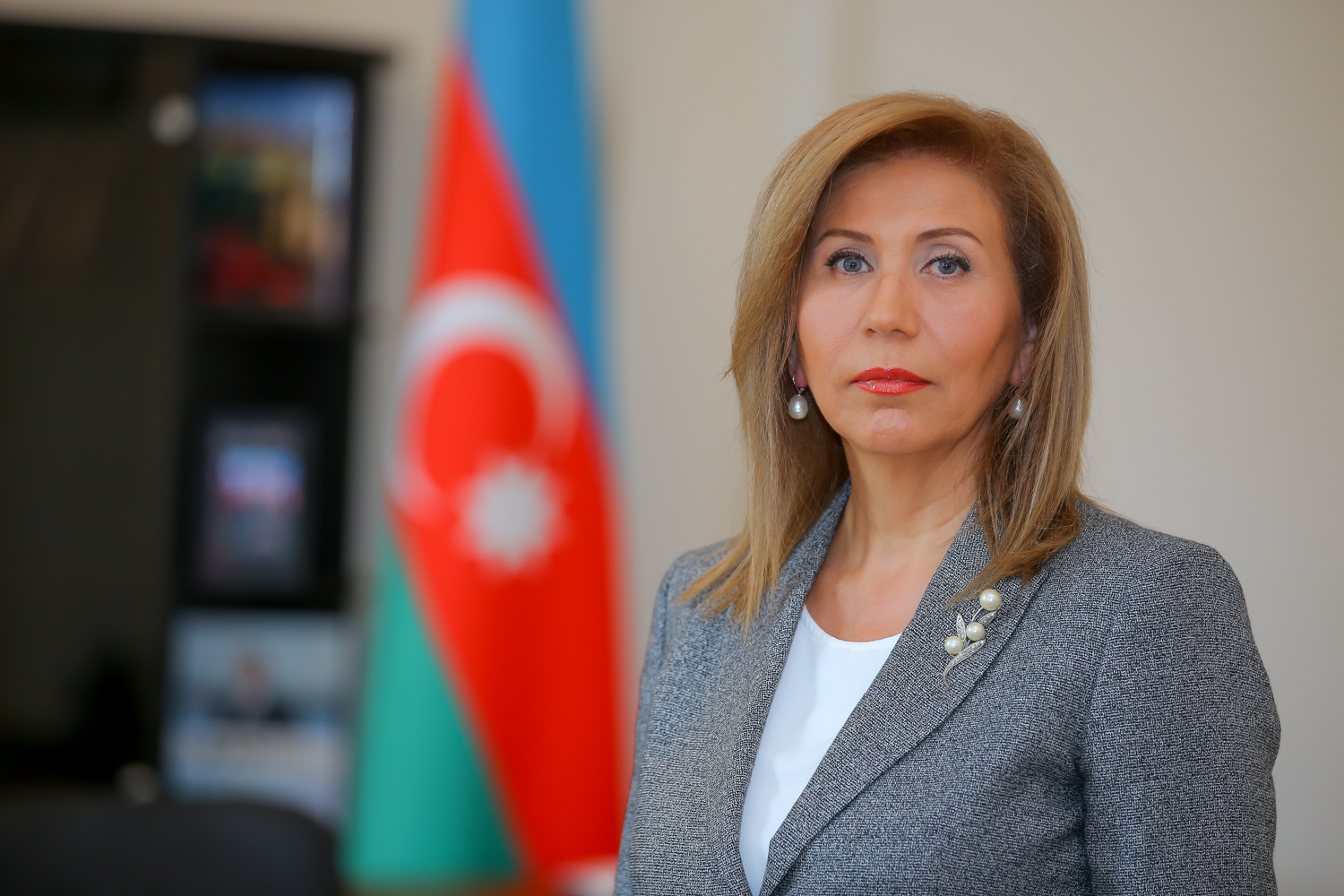

Chairperson of the State Committee on Family, Women and Children Affairs of Azerbaijan
- Incumbent
- Assumed office 12 March 2020
- President: Ilham Aliyev

Deputy Speaker of the National Assembly of Azerbaijan
- In office 2005–2019

Member of the National Assembly of Azerbaijan
- Incumbent
- Assumed office 2005
- Constituency: Füzuli

Personal details
- Born: March 20, 1962 (age 64) Füzuli, Füzuli rayon, Soviet Union
- Party: New Azerbaijan Party
- Education: Baku Light Industry Technical School; Baku State University
- Occupation: Politician
- Awards: Order of Glory

Bahar Avaz Muradova (born 20 March 1962) is an Azerbaijani politician affiliated to the New Azerbaijan Party and former deputy speaker of the National Assembly of Azerbaijan (2005–2019).

== Early life ==
Born in Füzuli, Füzuli rayon, Soviet Union on 20 March 1962, Muradova attended the Baku Light Industry Technical School, from where she received a diploma in textile industry. Later she joined the Baku State University to study law. She did her doctorate in Political Science.

== Career ==
In 1981, Muradova took up the job of supervisor at a textile factory in Baku. Later, she turned to politics and became a member of New Azerbaijan Party (YAP) in 1993 and has since held important positions within the party, including that of deputy chairman of party's female cadre and a deputy executive secretary. From 1995 to 2000, Muradova served in the Office of the Azerbaijani President. After winning the Azerbaijani parliamentary election in 2005, she was appointed the deputy speaker of the National Assembly of Azerbaijan. She is a recipient of the Order of Glory and has also published five scholarly papers. She retained her seat from Füzuli̇ in the 2015 Azerbaijani parliamentary election. Bahar Muradova was appointed the chairperson of the State Committee on Family, Women and Children Affairs of Azerbaijan on March 12, 2020, by the President Ilham Aliyev.

== Personal life ==
Muradova is married and has one daughter.
