= Mikayil Mikayilov =

Mikayil Mikayilov Mikayıl Mikayılov
- Born: July 21, 1981 (age 44); Baku, Azerbaijan
- Occupation: Theatre and cinema director, actor

Mikayil Mikayilov (born July 21, 1981, Azerbaijan, Baku) is a theater director, film director, actor, and choreographer.

== Early life and education ==
Mikayilov was born in Baku, Azerbaijan. He graduated from the Baku Choreography Institute in 2000. He also graduated from the Azerbaijan State University of Culture and Art with a magister degree in directing.

== Filmography ==
- 2002 "Carmen"
- 2002 "A Winter Saturday Right after the Flood"
- 2004 "Once upon a Time"
- 2005 "The Dead and The Alive
- Pəri qala
- 2015 "Phenomenon"

== Theater ==
- VIY (2005)
- SNAKE SKIN (2006)
- BEGGAR SON OF THE MILLIONAIRE (2007)
- WAVES (2009)
