= Vafa Fatullayeva =

- Vəfa Fətullayeva
- Born: Vafa Nusrat Fatullayeva; August 25, 1945; Baku, Azerbaijan SSR, Soviet Union
- Died: May 21, 1987 (aged 41); Baku, Azerbaijan SSR, Soviet Union
- Known for: role of "Firangiz"
- Parent(s): Hokuma Gurbanova, Nusrat Hafiz Fatullayev
- Awards: Azerbaijan SSR State Prize 1984 Azerbaijan SSR Honored artist

Vafa Nusrat Fatullayeva (Azerbaijani: Vəfa Fətullayeva; August 25, 1945, Baku – May 21, 1987, Baku) was an Azerbaijani actress. She was awarded the title Honored Artist of the Azerbaijan USSR (1982), and State Prize Winner of the Azerbaijan USSR (1984).

== Biography ==
Vafa Fatullayeva was born on August 25, 1945, in Baku to actor Nusrat Fatullayev and actress Hokuma Gurbanova. In 1971 she graduated from the Azerbaijan State Institute of Arts named after M. A. Aliyev. Since 1970 she played on the stage of Azerbaijan State Drama Theater named after M. Azizbekov.

In 1982, Vafa Fatullaeva was awarded the title of Honored Artist of the Azerbaijan USSR, and in 1984 she became a laureate of the State Prize of the Azerbaijan USSR. Vafa Fatullaeva was terminally ill and died on May 21, 1987. Two months later her father Nusrat Fatullayev died, for whom the loss of Vafa was a huge tragedy. After the death of her daughter, Hokuma Gurbanova fell ill and a year later died.

Vafa Featullayev's father Nusrat Fatullayev was the first artist of the Azerbaijani theater and a national artist. Her mother Hokuma Gurbanova was one of the most famous actresses, the USSR People's Artist.

== Roles ==
- Gulgaz ("The song remains in the mountains", I. Efendiyev),
- Shirin ("The Legend of Love", N. Hikmet),
- Tanzila ("If you do not burn", N. Khazri),
- Sharafnisa ("Monsieur Jordan and Dervish Mastalishah", M.F. Akhundov),
- Beatrice ("Much ado about Nothing ", W. Shakespeare),
- Banovsha ("The Village Girl", M. Ibrahimov),
- Rana (" I came for you", Anar) and others.

Vafa Fatullayeva's Television performances are "Ophthalmologist", "Alov", "Atayevs family" and others.
