= Izzet Orujova =

Azerbaijani Soviet actor and chemist

- İzzət Orucova
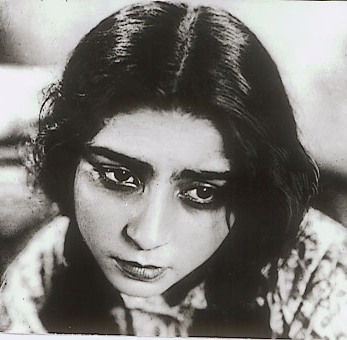
- Orujova in Sevil (1929)
- Born: Izzet Khanim Mirzaaga Orujova; September 16, 1909; Baku, Baku Governorate, Russian Empire
- Died: April 22, 1983 (aged 73); Baku, Azerbaijan SSR, Soviet Union
- Education: Azerbaijan State Oil and Industry University
- Occupations: Chemist, actress
- Children: 1

Izzet Khanim Mirzaaga Orujova (Azerbaijani: İzzət Xanım Mirzəağa Orucova; 16 September 1909 – 22 April 1983) was an Azerbaijani chemist and actress. She was the first Azerbaijani film actress, starring in the film Sevil (1929), and an important figure in the Azerbaijani women's rights movement for her portrayal of a liberated young woman in the film. She later enjoyed a distinguished academic career, being one of the first female chemistry students in Azerbaijan and the country's first female oil engineer. Her research on improving motor oils was important to the war effort of the Soviet Union in World War II and earned her the Order of the Badge of Honour. Throughout her scientific career she authored hundreds of works, held talks internationally, and was awarded numerous other awards.

== Early life ==
Izzet Khanim Mirza-Age Orujova was born in Baku on 16 September 1909. Orujova's father was a gardener named Mirza Agha. She was the eldest of five children and had sisters and brothers.

== Acting ==
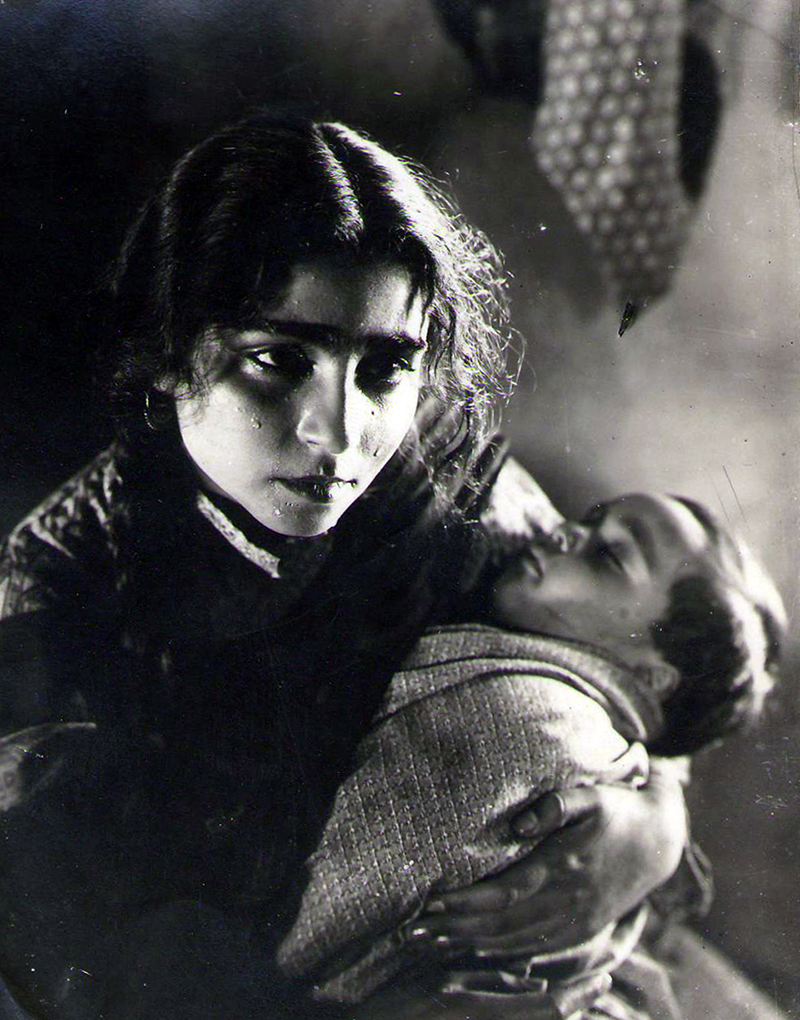
Orujova in Sevil (1929)

At the age of 19, Orujova was noticed while on a walk in Baku by film director Ismail Idayatzadeh and playwright Jafar Jabbarly. At the time, Idayatzadeh and Jabbarly were searching for actresses suitable for portraying the main role in the film Sevil (1929), based on a play of the same name by Jabbarly. Sevil is about themes such as freedom and equality, the struggle for women's rights, and the disappearance of the old world and its traditional customs. The main character in the film was an Azerbaijani girl named Sevil, who is kicked out by her husband Balash and takes fate in her own hands, studying in Moscow and removing her hijab as a statement of liberation and emancipation. Although her husband Balash attempts to return to Sevil after she returns from Moscow, she refuses him after having realised that she does not need him.

Though Azerbaijani women had long not been allowed to appear in films and there were already several Armenian girls considered for the role, Jabbarly was adamant that an Azerbaijani girl had to play the role, both to stay true to his source material and as a bold challenge to society. The challenge was made especially daunting since Orujova filmed without a hijab. To ensure her safety, Jabbarly personally drove Orujova to and from filming. Although Orujova's father at first forbade her from appearing in the film, he was convinced after repeated meetings with Idayatzadeh and Jabbarly.

Following the filming of Sevil, Orujova and her sisters were among the first Azerbaijani women to remove their hijab. The premiere of the film, which was attended by Orujova's entire family, convinced more women to throw off their hijab, including Orujova's mother.

Orujova was the first Azerbaijani film actress and Sevil was the first Azerbaijani film with sound. Orujova's performance as a liberated young woman had a significant impact on the evolving women's rights movements in the country. After the premiere of Sevil on 3 September 1929, Orujova's successful performance in the film inspired Jabbarly to write a further film script with her in mind for the main role, Almaz. The death of Jabbarly in 1934 meant that he was not involved in the film's production. Almaz was eventually filmed and released in 1936, produced by Jabbarly's friends and with Orujova starring in the film. In Almaz, Orujova portrays the teacher Almaz who arrives in a village and struggles with the ignorance and illiteracy of the locals.

== Academic career ==
Orujova was one of the first female students of chemistry in Azerbaijan and the country's first female oil engineer. While a student, she also worked as a typist to help support her family. In 1932, Orujova graduated from the Azerbaijan State Oil and Industry University in Baku as a petrochemical technologist. As a scientist, Orujova developed new methods for producing oil additives, which improved the quality of motor oils. She worked at the Azerbaijan State Oil and Industry University from 1932 to 1959. Her improvements to motor oils were important for the war effort of the Soviet Union in World War II and she worked continuously on oils throughout the war.

Orujova defended her doctoral thesis in 1947, becoming a Doctor of Technical Sciences. From 1959 to 1967, she worked as a laboratory director at the Institute of Petrochemical Processes in Baku. In 1972 Orujova became a professor and the director of the Institute of Inorganic and Physical Chemistry of the Academy of Sciences of the Azerbaijan SSR. She was one of the first Azerbaijani women to work as an academic at the Academy of the Sciences, working there until 1971. From 1971 to 1983 she worked as the head of the additive composition preparation laboratory at the Institute of Additive Chemistry.

As a scientist, Orujova represented chemistry in Azerbaijan internationally and gave talks in countries such as Portugal, Hungary, Germany and Canada. She was a chairman of the German-Azerbaijani Friendship Society and was on the editorial board of the Azerbaijani Soviet Encyclopedia (1976–1987). In total, she authored more than 300 scientific works. Orujova was awarded with the State Prize of the Azerbaijan SSR in 1970. Throughout her scientific career she was awarded numerous other awards, including the Order of Lenin, the Order of the October Revolution, the Order of the Red Banner of Labour, and the Order of the Badge of Honour. The Badge of Honour was awarded to her for her contributions to the Soviet war effort in World War II.

== Personal life ==
Orujova's husband, Movsum Ismayilzade, was arrested by the Bolsheviks as an enemy of the people in 1937 and only narrowly avoided execution. He divorced Orujova in anticipation of his arrest to save her from repressions, which could have included exile to Siberia. After having been forced into exile for several years, Ismayilzade was allowed to return to Azerbaijan but he was forbidden from seeing Orujova and from living in Baku. As a consequence, Orujova raised their son, Yilmaz, alone.

Orujova died in Baku on 22 April 1983 at the age of 73. The additive composition preparation laboratory at the Institute of Additive Chemistry was renamed in her honour. On 7 October 2009 a memorial evening was hosted in Orujova's honor at the Museum Centre of the Ministry of Culture of the Republic of Azerbaijan, to mark the 100th anniversary of her birth. She may have been the basis of the Statue of a Liberated Woman in Baku, which was inspired by Sevil.
