= List of People's Artistes of the Azerbaijan SSR =

This is a list of People's Artiste of the Azerbaijan SSR (1931–1991); which after 1998, was renamed and rededicated as the People's Artiste of Azerbaijan to reflect the new country leadership. It was awarded for artists within the theater, cinema, and music fields.

== 1930s ==
=== 1931 ===
- Gurban Pirimov (1880–1965), tarist, the first awardee

=== 1932 ===
- Abbasov Hajiagha Muttalib oglu (1888–1975), theater actor, playwright
- Hovhannes Abelian (1865–1936), Armenian film and theater actor
- Huseyngulu Sarabski (1879–1945), Soviet Azerbaijani opera singer (tenor)

=== 1933 ===
- Mirzaagha Aliyev (1883–1954), film and theater actor

=== 1934 ===
- Reinhold Glière (1875–1956), composer
- Shovkat Mammadova (1897–1981), opera singer
- Vasily Nikolsky (1882–1967), opera singer

=== 1935 ===
- Mary losifovna Zhasmen (1894–?), actress
- Vahram Papazian (1888–1968), actor

=== 1936 ===
- Marziyya Davudova (1901–1962), actress
- Abbas Mirza Sharifzadeh (1893–1938), theater actor and director
- Alexander Tuganov, director

=== 1937 ===
- Uzeyir Hajibeyov (1885–1948), composer, conductor, writer, columnist, playwright and teacher

=== 1938 ===
- Mammadtaghi Baghirov (1890–1961), opera singer
- Huseynagha Hajibababeyov (1898–1972), singer
- Agha Javadov (1894–1981), actor
- Sidgi Ruhulla (1886–1959), actor

== 1940s ==
=== 1940 ===
- Alasgar Alakbarov (1910–1963), film and theater actor
- Aghasadyg Garaybeyli (1897–1988), film and theater actor
- Fatma Mukhtarova (1893 or 1898 – 1972), opera singer

=== 1943 ===
- Gamar Almaszadeh (1915–2006), ballerina
- Rza Afganly (1899–1973), film and theater actor
- Adil Isgandarov (1910–1978), director, film and theater actor
- Kazim Zia (1896–1956), film and theater actor, director
- Mustafa Mardanov, film and theater actor
- Hagigat Rzayeva (1907–1969), opera singer

=== 1946 ===
- Alexei L. Gripich (1891–1983), theater director

=== 1947 ===
- Barat Shakinskaya (1914–1999), theater and film actress

=== 1948 ===
- Ismail Osman Osmanli (1902–1978), film and theater actor

=== 1949 ===
- Heydar Velikhanli (1899–1969), film and theater actor
- Sona Salman Hajiyev (1907–1979), actress
- Ismayil Daghistanli (1907–1980), actor
- Movsun Sanani (1900–1981), actor
- Alexander Andriasovich Hovhannisyan (1895–1949), actor of theater
- Yeva Olenskaya (1900–1959), actress

== 1950s ==
=== 1951 ===
- Rashid Behbudov (1915–1989), opera singer

=== 1954 ===
- Aliagha Aghayev (1913–1983), film and theater actor
- Arkady Nikolayevich Arzumanyan (1898–1985), film and theater actor
- Suraya Sadraddin Qajar (1910–1992), singer

=== 1955 ===
- Gurgen M. Harutyunyan (1905–1973), theater actor
- Niyazi (1912–1984), composer and conductor

=== 1956 ===
- Vladimir Vladimirovich Otradinsky (1904–1971), theater actor

=== 1957 ===
- Said Rustamov (1907–1983), composer, teacher and conductor

=== 1958 ===
- Fikret Amirov (1922–1984), composer
- Leyla Vakilova (1927–1999), ballerina
- Gara Garayev (1918–1982), composer
- Mehdi Asadullah Mamedov (1918–1985), actor and director

=== 1959 ===
- Alibala Abdullah Abdullayev (1915–1980), dancer and choreographer
- Leyla Badirbeyli (1920–1999), film actress
- Amina Dilbazi (1919–2010), dancer
- Nadir Gasimov (1928–2000), painter

== 1960s ==
=== 1960 ===
- Lutfali Abdullayev (1914–1973), theater and film actor
- Afrasiyab Badalbeyli (1907–1976), composer, conductor, writer and musicologist
- Soltan Hajibeyov (1919–1974), composer
- Hokuma Gurbanova (1913–1988), film actress

=== 1962 ===
- Nina Ovanesovna Osipyan (1913–1977), actress

=== 1963 ===
- Jahangir Jahangirov (1921–1992), composer, conductor and choirmaster

=== 1964 ===
- Franghiz Ahmadova (1928–2011), opera singer
- Shamsi Badalbeyli (1911–1986), theater director
- Rauf Hajiyev (1922–1995), composer
- Tofig Guliyev (1917–2000), composer, pianist and conductor

=== 1966 ===
- Rza Tahmasib (1894–1980), theater director, actor

=== 1967 ===
- Kamal Abdullayev (1927–1997), conductor, educator
- Rauf Atakishiyev (1925–1994), pianist and educator
- Zarosh Hamzayeva (1925–2004), actress
- Lutfiyar Imanov (1928–2008), an operatic singer
- Togrul Narimanbekov (1930–2013), painter and opera singer

=== 1968 ===
- Mayor Brenner (1906–1973), pianist and educator

=== 1969 ===
- Firangiz Sharifova (1924–2014), actress and singer

== 1970s ==
=== 1970 ===
- Rafiga Akhundova (1931-2024), Ballerina, choreographer, teacher

=== 1971 ===
- Ajdar Ibrahimov (1919–1993), filmmaker
- Muslim Magomayev (1942–2008), Soviet, Azerbaijani and Russian opera and variety singer (baritone), composer
- Rubaba Muradova (1930–1983), opera singer (mezzo-soprano)

=== 1972 ===
- Konstantin Adamov (1923), actor and producer
- Safar Aliyeva (1907–1984), pianist and teacher
- Anatoliy Falkovich (1923–1994), actor

=== 1973 ===
- Ahmad Bakikhanov (1892–1973), tarist
- Lyudmila Sakina (1929–2009), singer
- Aram Khachaturian (1903–1978)

=== 1974 ===
- Sofa Bashirzade (1918–2000), actress
- Malik Dadashov (1924–1996), actor
- Nasiba Zeynalova (1916–2004), actress
- Najiba Malikova (1921–1992), actress
- Nina Sarnachkaya (1909–1986), actress

=== 1975 ===
- Zeynab Khanlarova (1936), opera singer

=== 1976 ===
- Mukhtar Dadashov (1913–1998), operator, screenwriter, director, actor
- Hasan Sayidbayli (1920–1980), writer, playwright, screenwriter, director
- Tofig Tahgizade (1919–1998), actor, screenwriter, director

=== 1977 ===
- Khosrov Abdullayev (1926–1980), circus artist, juggler, illusionist

=== 1978 ===
- Farhad Badalbeyli (1947), pianist
- Bahram Mansurov (1911–1985), Soviet Azerbaijani artist
- Arif Malikov (1933), Soviet Azerbaijani compositor
- Afag Malikova (born 1947), Azerbaijani dancer
- Tamilla Shiraliyeva (1946), Soviet Azerbaijani ballerina, teacher, choreographer

=== 1979 ===
- Zinovar Gevokrkyan (1920–2005), theater actor
- Yusif Valiyev (1917–1980), Soviet Azerbaijani actor
- Huseynagha Sadigov (1914–1983), Soviet Azerbaijani actor

== 1980s ==
=== 1982 ===
- Hasan Mammadov (1938-2003) Azerbaijani actor

=== 1985 ===
- Amaliya Panahova (1945–2018), Azerbaijani actress and director

=== 1986 ===
- Khuraman Gasimova (born 1951), Azerbaijani singer and actress

=== 1987 ===
- Agshin Alizadeh (1937–2014), Soviet Azerbaijani composer
- Lev Gruber (1923–1994), Soviet Azerbaijani theater actor, in 1990 he moved to Israel
- Fuad Poladov (1948–2018), Azerbaijani actor
- Akbar Kardashbeyov (1923–2001), Azerbaijani actor
- Khayyam Mirzazade (1935–2018), Soviet Azerbaijani composer
- Ramiz Mustafayev (1926–2008), Soviet Azerbaijani musician
- Chingiz Sadykhov (1929–2017), Azerbaijani musician, pianist

=== 1988 ===
- Haji Khanmammadov (1918–2005), Azerbaijani and Soviet composer
- Ramiz Guliyev (born 1947), Azerbaijani musician

=== 1989 ===
- Shahmar Alakbarov (1943–1992), Azerbaijani actor and film director
- Arif Babayev (singer) (born 1938), Azerbaijani singer
- Yashar Nuri (1951–2012), Azerbaijani-Soviet actor
- Islam Rzayev (1934–2008), Azerbaijani singer
- Vasif Babayev, Soviet Azerbaijani television and film director
- Tofik Akhundov (born 1941), Soviet–Azerbaijani circus artist and animal trainer
- Habib Bayramov (1926–1994), Soviet–Azerbaijani musician
- Aliaga Guliyev, Soviet–Azerbaijani musician
- Alibaba Mammadov (1929–2022), Azerbaijani singer and composer

== 1990 ==
- Rafig Huseynov (announcer) (1946–2017), Soviet–Azerbaijani television announcer
- Fatma Jabbarova (1920–2010), Soviet–Azerbaijani announcer of Azdevlattele Radio
- Ashraf Abbasov (1920–1992), Soviet Azerbaijani composer
- Yagub Mammadov (singer) (1930–1993), Soviet Azerbaijani mugham singer
- Hajibaba Huseynov (1919–1993), Soviet Azerbaijani singer
- Tofig Bakikhanov (1930–2026), Azerbaijani composer
- Ibrahim Mammadov (composer) (1928–1993), Soviet Azerbaijani composer
- Ramiz Mirishli (1934–2015), Soviet and Azerbaijani composer
- Azer Rzayev (1930–2015), Soviet and Azerbaijani composter

=== 1991 ===
- Ajdar Ibrahimbeyov, Soviet and Azerbaijani film director; the last awardee
- Solmaz Gurbanova, Azerbaijani actress

== See also ==
- People's Artiste of Azerbaijan
- People's Artist
- Azerbaijan SSR
