= Ali Zulalov =

Ali Zulalov Əli Zülalov
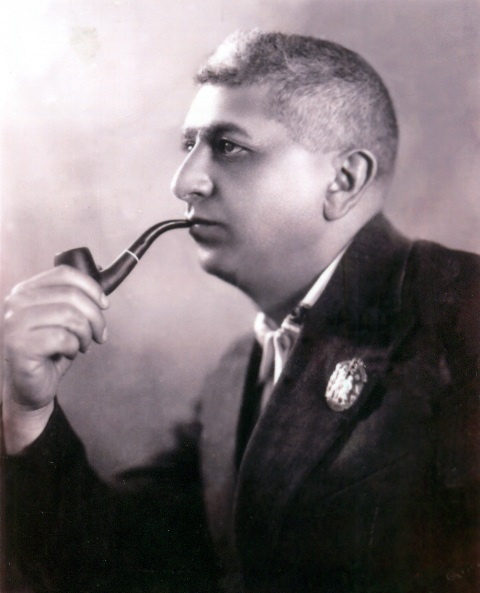
- Born: September 13, 1893; Shusha, Shusha uezd, Elizavetpol Governorate, Russian Empire
- Died: February 18, 1963 (aged 69); Baku, Azerbaijan SSR, USSR
- Occupations: opera singer, actor
- Years active: 1917–1952
- Awards: Honored Artist of the Azerbaijan SSR Order of the Badge of Honour

Ali Abdul oghlu Zulalov (Azerbaijani: Əli Əbdül oğlu Zülalov, 13 September 1893 – 18 February 1963) was an Azerbaijani opera singer. He was awarded the title Honored Artist of the Azerbaijan SSR.

== Biography ==
Ali Zulalov was born on September 13, 1893, in Shusha. After the death of his father Abdul Zulalov in 1898, he and his brother Gambar Zulalov were taken into the care of his uncle Bulbuljan. He graduated from Shusha Realni School. Ali Zulalov started his stage career in 1917 in Shusha. Uzeyir Hajibeyov, who was friends with Bulbuljan, hired him to the choir of the opera and operetta troupe he led during a one-year probationary period. He began performing in the musical performances of Academic National Drama Theatre from early 1920s to 1925. Ali Zulalov was one of the first performers of female roles after Ahmad Aghdamski. Ali Zulalov later graduated from Baku Music College and the Azerbaijan State Conservatory. From 1925 to 1952, he worked at Azerbaijan State Academic Opera and Ballet Theater.

In 1938, for his participation in the Decade of Azerbaijani Art in Moscow, he was awarded the Order of the Badge of Honour for his role as Mullah Mutallim in Muslim Magomayev's Nargiz opera.

Ali Zulalov died on February 18, 1963, in Baku.

== Awards and honorary titles ==
- Honored Artist of the Azerbaijan SSR – 27 April 1940
- Order of the Badge of Honour — 17 April 1938

== Family tree ==
Karbalayi; Ali Zulalov
Gulush khanim	Abdul; Zulalov	Abdulbagi; Zulalov	Nisa khanim
Ali; Zulalov	Gambar; Zulalov	Mammadali; Zulalov	Aziza; Mammadova	Salman
Solmaz; Zulalova	Zemfira; Zulalova	Elmira; Zulalova	Rustam; Zulalov	Sona; Hajiyeva
