= Azerbaijan national awakening =

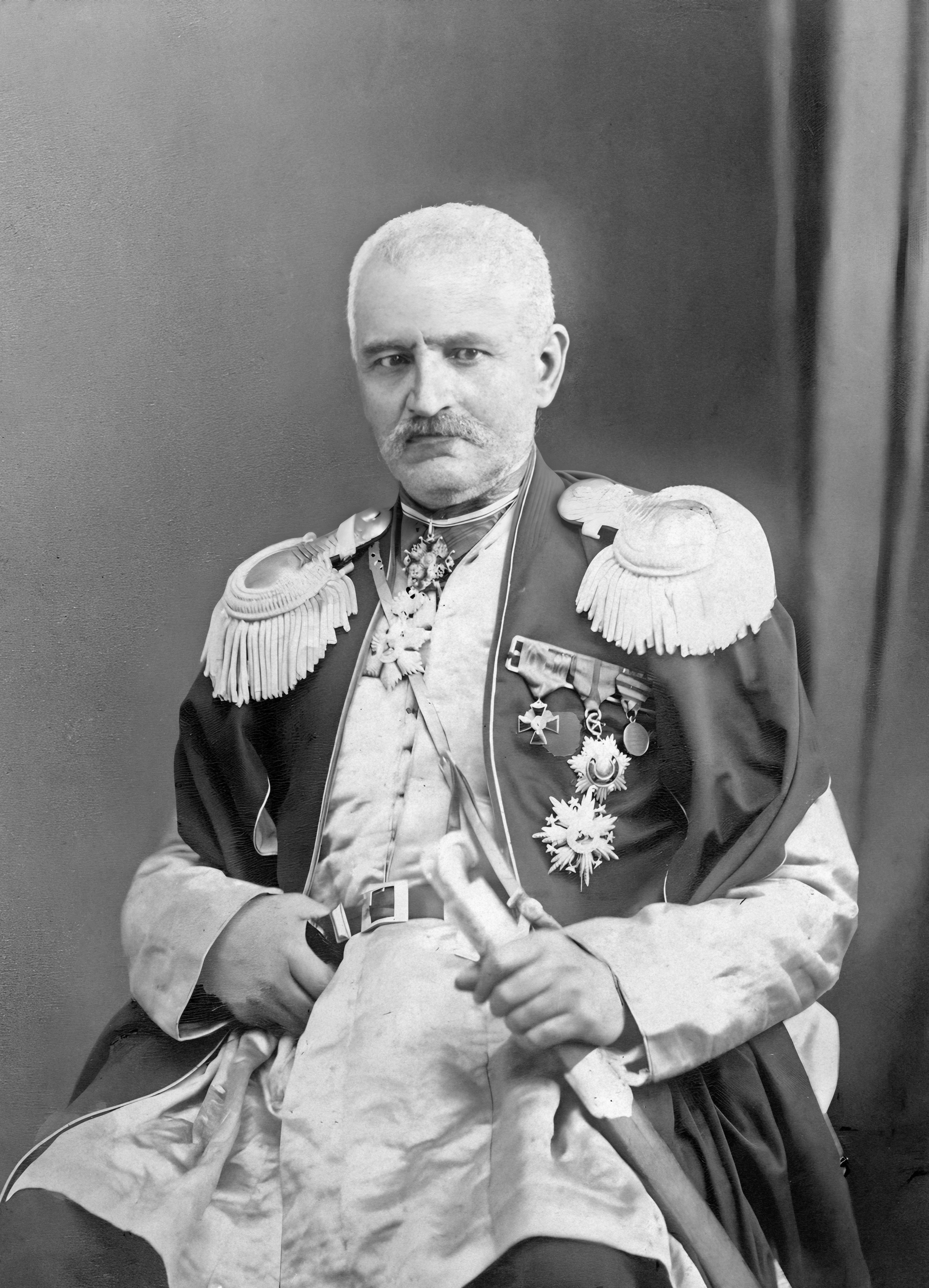
Azerbaijani playwright, philosopher, and founder of Azerbaijani modern literary criticism Mirza Fath-Ali Akhundov

Azerbaijani national awakening or the period of Azerbaijani cultural renaissance (Azerbaijani آذربایجان ملی اویانیشی Azerbaycan milli uyanışı) is the process of formation of national opinion and flourishing of culture of Azerbaijanis living in the Russian Empire in the late 19th and early 20th centuries. This period is characterized by the spread of enlightenment in Azerbaijan, the development of education, press and art, the implementation of Western values and institutions.

Thus, Azerbaijan became the first country in the Islamic world to establish a national theatre, opera, western-style university and ballet, and the Azerbaijan People's Republic went down in history as one of the first secular democratic states in the Islamic world. It is the first state among Islamic countries to grant women the right to vote and be elected. Azerbaijani reformist intellectuals of the Enlightenment period gained influence in the South Caucasus as well as in Iran, the Ottoman Empire and Central Asia through their publications, theater groups and participation in constitutional movements in neighboring countries.

== Early life ==
The Vakif council, named after the minister of the Karabakh Khanate, Molla Panah Vakif, was famous for writing and reading poetry in the Azerbaijani language. Anna Oldfield, a professor of world literature, believes this is an indication of "Azerbaijan's rising national consciousness", and Ashik Peri, who attended the Vakiff meeting, was among those defending "the mother tongue and the traditions of poetry".

== Main period ==
Before the Russian occupation, Azerbaijani cultural life was heavily influenced by Persian civilization. Russia, concerned about this cultural connection, supported the development of local Turkic culture. These and other social trends led to the revival of local Turkic culture. The revival of Azerbaijani culture can be divided into three stages: the period until 1905, from 1905 to the 1920s, and from the 1920s to the present.

The first stage, which lasted until 1905, was initiated by Mirza Fatali Akhundov. He demanded language reform, equal rights for women, and the replacement of the Arabic alphabet with Latin. Other writers also began to imitate Akhundov's style and writing. The newspaper "Akinchi" demanded the abolition of serfdom, equal rights for all citizens, and the organization of schools. The literature of this period criticized the current situation and called for reform. According to the current realities, there was no demand for political independence. The educators of the 19th century, Abbasgulu Agha Bakykhanov, Ismail Bey Gutgashinli, Mirza Shafi Vazeh, Mirza Fatali Akhundov, believed that they could overcome the cultural backwardness of Azerbaijan through science and education. In the 70s and 80s of the 19th century, as a result of the influence of various revolutionary theories on socio-political ideas in Azerbaijan, the development of capitalism created positive conditions for the creation of a national intelligentsia, support for educational and cultural activities, and philanthropy. The number of associations, presses and printing houses increased. The Azerbaijani intellectuals began to gather around magazines and newspapers that were considered carriers of national memory, associations and societies such as "Nicat", "Safa", "Adab Yurdu", "Nashri-Maarif", "Jamiyati-Kheyriye". The first reading rooms were opened in Baku in 1894 by Habib Bey Mahmudbeyov and Sultan Mecid Ganizade. The most important events of this period were the establishment of the national theatre, the press and a modern school. In 1873, the theatre group headed by Hasan bey Zardabi and Najaf bey Vazirov staged the plays "Sarguzeshti-vaziri-khani-Lankaran" and "Sarguzeshti Mardi-Khasis", laying the foundations of the Azerbaijani national theatre. In 1875, Hasan bey Zardabi founded the Azerbaijani national press with the first newspaper printed in the Azerbaijani language, "Akinchi". Finally, in 1887, new types of schools were established, which focused on teaching the Azerbaijani language, unlike Islamic schools and madrasahs. The initiators of this work were Habib bey Mahmudbeyov and Sultan Mecid Ganizade.

== The issue of national identity and language ==
The formation of Azerbaijani national identity is closely connected with the political, cultural and social processes that took place in the late 19th and early 20th centuries. The modernization movements, publishing and educational activities that took place in the region during this period strengthened the process of national self-awareness. The Azerbaijan Democratic Republic (1918–1920), the first parliamentary republic in the Muslim East, played an important role in the formation of the legal and political foundations of national identity.

Despite the centralized ideology during the Soviet period, the development of the Azerbaijani language and literature continued, which preserved the cultural foundations of national identity. With the restoration of independence in 1991, the legal and ideological framework of national identity became even clearer and entered the stage of completion.
