= Ali Gurbanov =

Actor

- Əli Qurbanov
- Born: June 20, 1898; Tbilisi, Tiflis Governorate, Russian Empire
- Died: October 14, 1962 (aged 64); Baku, Azerbaijan SSR, USSR
- Occupation: Actor
- Years active: 1914–1962
- Awards: People's Artist of the Azerbaijan SSR Honored Artist of the Azerbaijan SSR Order of Lenin Order of the Red Banner of Labour Order of the Badge of Honour

Ali Mirzali oghlu Gurbanov (Azerbaijani: Əli Mirzəli oğlu Qurbanov; June 20, 1898 – October 10, 1962) was an Azerbaijani actor, People's Artist of the Azerbaijan SSR.

== Biography ==
Ali Gurbanov was born on June 20, 1898, in Tbilisi. He began his acting career in 1914 in Tbilisi in a troupe of theater lovers. For the first time he appeared on the stage, at the insistence of Mohsun Sanani, with a single word "let's go" in the amateur play "Gaveyi-Ahangar". In 1915, he played the role of Rustam Bey in the play "If Not That One, Then This One". After this event, he was invited not only to drama performances, but also to operas, operettas and contests as both an artist and a tar player.

In 1917, the "Ittihad" Drama Society was established in Tbilisi, and in the same year Ali Gurbanov was invited to join the troupe. He performed in "Unfortunate Young Man" (Old Peasant) and "Pari Jadu" (Niyaz) with the "Ittihad" troupe.

Ali Gurbanov had been acting in the "Ibret" drama society since 1918. He worked in this troupe with such actors as Mirzali Abbasov, Mirzakhan Guliyev, Mirseyfaddin Kirmanshahli, Ibrahim Isfahanli. He played the roles of Haji Hasan ("Olular"), Shahmar bey ("Musibati Fakhraddin"), Shah Sultan Huseyn khan ("Nadir Shah"), Javad bey ("Daghilan Tifag"), Asgar bey ("Haji Gara") and others.

The Tbilisi Theater, which operated as a troupe until 1921, became the Tbilisi State Azerbaijan Drama Theater that year. Since then, Ali Gurbanov, along with other actors, had become an actor of the same theater. He toured Turkey in 1922 and Iran in 1925 as part of the Tbilisi State Azerbaijan Drama Theater.

He was invited to the Azerbaijan State Drama Theater in late 1925 by the order of the Azerbaijan People's Commissariat of Education and worked there until the end of his life.

Ali Gurbanov had been on stage for more than 50 years. During this time, he played about 200 different roles. He played the role of Vidadi more than 700 times, the role of Azizbeyov and Haji Ahmad more than 350 times. The actor has also acted in films of the Azerbaijanfilm Film Studio named after J. Jabbarli for more than 40 years. Ali Gurbanov, who first played the role of Ashug in the film "Haji Gara" in 1928, later he created memorable images by appearing in films "Peasants", "Almaz" (Aftil), "New Horizon", "Sabuhi" (Aghalarov), "Bakhtiar" (Gurban), "To My Native People" (curling master), "The song is created like this" (Blind ashug), "Under the hot sun" (Uncle Ali), "Black Stones" (Master Ramazan), "Stepmother" (shepherd), "The Secret of a Fortress" (Kamran grandfather) and so on.

== Family ==
He is the brother of Honored Artist of the Georgian SSR Abbas Gurbanov, cousin of People's Artist of the Azerbaijan SSR Mohsun Sanani and actor of the Tbilisi Azerbaijan Theater Abulfat Sanani.

== Awards ==
- People's Artist of the Azerbaijan SSR – April 23, 1940
- Honored Artist of the Azerbaijan SSR – December 4, 1938
- Order of Lenin (July 22, 1949 June 9, 1959)
- Order of the Red Banner of Labour
- Order of the Badge of Honour

== Sources ==
- "Сәнае вә кәнд тәсәррүфаты габагҹылларынын, элм, маариф, сәһиййә вә инҹәсәнәт ишчиләринин, Фәһлә-Кәндли Гызыл Ордусу командирләринин, сияси ишчиләринин вә гызыл әскәрләринин, совет ишчиләринин вә башга ишчиләрин тәлтиф эдилмәләри һаггында фәрман". Азәрбайҹан Совет Социалист Республикасы Баш Советинин Ведомостлары. Vol. 2 (6 ed.). Baku: Азполиграф. 1940. pp. 3–4.
- Cəlil Məmmədquluzadə Ensiklopediyası (in Azerbaijani). Baku. 2008. p. 159.
- "50 ildən artıq böyük səhnədə" (in Azerbaijani). Kaspi. June 21, 2011.
