= Sevil (1970 film) =

- Directed by: Vladimir Goriket
- Written by: Jafar Jabbarli
- Based on: Sevil
- Release date: 1970
- Country: Soviet Union
- Languages: Azerbaijani, Russian

Sevil is a film made in 1970 in the Azerbaijan SSR. It was directed by Vladimir Goriket, and is based on the work of the same name by Jafar Jabbarly.

== Content ==
At the center of the film is the fate of an Azerbaijani woman who rebels against ignorance and strives to find her place in life. Sevil's (Valentina Aslanova) fate is portrayed as representative of the fate of Azerbaijani women.

== About the film ==
The film is based on the play of the same name by playwright Jafar Jabbarly and the opera of the same name by composer Fikret Amirov. The film is the first film-opera in the history of Azerbaijani cinema. It is also the first film-opera on a contemporary subject in the history of Soviet cinematography.

== Cast and crew ==
=== Crew ===
- Author: Jafar Jabbarly (play), Fikret Amirov (opera)
- Screenwriters: Vladimir Gorikker, Andrey Donatov, Talat Ayyubov
- Director: Vladimir Gorikker
- Cinematographer: Rasim Ismayilov
- Production Designer: Elbay Rzaguliyev
- Composer: Fikret Amirov
- Sound Engineer: Grigori Korenblyum
- Costume Designer: Badura Afganli
- Editor: Tahira Babayeva
- Makeup Artist: V. Bereznyakov
- Assistant Directors: Elmira Aliyeva, A. Aliyev, Akif Rustamov
- Assistant Cinematographers: Rafiq Karimov, Ziya Babayev (credited as Z. Babayev), Hamza Ahmadoglu
- Assistant Production Designer: Mayis Aghabayov
- Cinematographer for Set Scenes: Rasim Ismayilov
- Production Designer for Set Scenes: Mirza Rafiev
- Film Director: A. Dudiyev
- Singers: Firangiz Ahmadova (Sevil), Lutfiyar Imanov (Balash), Rahila Jabbarova (Gulush), Galina Oleynichenko (Dilber), V. Sultanov, Firudin Mehdiyev, Adil Malikov, K. Gurbanova, Mursel Badirov, L. Abayshvili, V. Gurbanov, L. Gnida, Islam Rzayev

=== Cast ===
- Valentina Aslanova — Sevil
- Hasan Mammadov — Balash
- Zemfira Ismayilova — Gulush
- Safura Ibrahimova — Dilber
- Hamlet Gurbanov — Abdulali Bey
- Mammadsadiq Nuriyev— Mammadali Bey
- Hasanagha Turabov — Rustamov
- Rza Afghanli — Atakishi
- Agharza Guliyev — Babakishi
- Leyla Badirbeyli — Tafta
- Insaf Mammadova — Sevil's Daughter
- Firuza Alikhanova
- P. Hajiyeva
- Azad Dadasov
- L. Nabiyeva
- S. Suleymanov
- Talat Rahmanov — Servant
- I. Morozova
- Aliheyder Hasanov
- Mukhtar Avsharov — Bey
- Rafiq Azimov — Officer
