= Gambar Zulalov =

Azerbaijani khananda and actor

- Azerbaijani: Qəmbər Zülalov
- Born: Qəmbər Əbdül oğlu Zülalov; 1895; Shusha, Shusha uezd, Elisabethpol Governorate, Russian Empire
- Died: 1976 (aged 82–83); Baku, Azerbaijan SSR, USSR
- Occupations: khananda, actor
- Years active: 1917–1975
- Awards: Honored Artist of the Azerbaijan SSR

Gambar Abdul oghlu Zulalov (Azerbaijani: Qəmbər Əbdül oğlu Zülalov; 1895 – 1976) was an Azerbaijani khananda and actor. He was awarded the title Honored Artist of the Azerbaijan SSR.

== Biography ==
Gambar Zulalov was born in 1895 in Shusha. After the death of his father Abdul Zulalov in 1898, he and his brother Ali Zulalov were taken into the care of his uncle Bulbuljan. Gambar Zulalov started his career in 1917 in Shusha. He came to Baku in 1919 after singing in Shusha for a while and playing opera and operetta roles in amateur performances. In 1926–1975 he was a soloist of Azerbaijan State Academic Opera and Ballet Theater with short breaks, where he performed roles Majnun's father, pasha, Nadir in Uzeyir Hajibeyov's operas "Leyli and Majnun", "Asli and Kerem", "Koroghlu".

He retired with honor at the age of 80. Gambar Zulalov died in 1976 in Baku.

== Awards ==
- Honored Artist of the Azerbaijan SSR — 26 April 1958

== Family tree ==
Karbalayi; Ali Zulalov
Gulush khanim	Abdul; Zulalov	Abdulbagi; Zulalov	Nisa khanim
Ali; Zulalov	Gambar; Zulalov	Mammadali; Zulalov	Aziza; Mammadova	Salman
Solmaz; Zulalova	Zemfira; Zulalova	Elmira; Zulalova	Rustam; Zulalov	Sona; Hajiyeva
