= Badura Afganli =

Azerbaijani theater artist (1912–2002)

- Bədurə Məlik qızı Əfqanlı
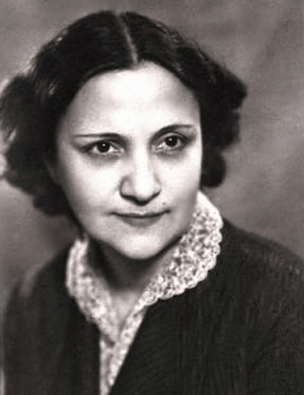
- Afganli in the 1940s
- Born: Badura Agamalova; October 25, 1912; Baku, Russian Empire
- Died: May 7, 2002 (aged 89); Baku, Azerbaijan
- Other names: Badura Malik gyzy Afganli
- Occupation(s): Set designer, costume designer
- Spouse: Rza Afganli
- Relatives: Sayavush Aslan (son-in-law)

Badura Afganli (Azerbaijani: Bədurə Məlik qızı Əfqanlı; maiden name Agamalova) (25 October 1912 – 7 May 2002) was a Soviet and Azerbaijani set designer and costume designer. She was one of the first Azerbaijani female theater designers. She was awarded the titles of People's Artiste of the Azerbaijan SSR (1974), and Honored Art Worker of the Azerbaijan SSR (1949).

== Early life and education ==
Badura Agamalova was born on 25 October 1912 in Baku. In 1931, she graduated from the Azerbaijan State Art College.

== Career ==
In 1934 to 1935, Agamalova created sketches of costumes and scenery for staging several performances at the Ashgabat State Azerbaijani State Theater (Leyli and Majnun by Uzeyir Hajiibeyov, Ashig Garib by Zulfugar Hajibeyov, Sheikh Sanan by Huseyn Javid, In 1905 by Jafar Jabbarly).

From 1938 to 1960, Afganli worked at the Azerbaijan State Drama Theater in Baku. Here she created sketches and designed such performances as Love and Revenge by Suleyman Sani Akhundov, Waiting by Mehdi Huseyn and Ilyas Afandiyev, The Ruined Nest by Abdurrahim bey Hagverdiyev, Vassa Zheleznova by Maxim Gorky, Othello by William Shakespeare (together with Nusrat Fatullayev), Shirvan Beauty by Anvar Mammadkhanli and others.

Since 1960, Afganli was a costume designer at the Azerbaijanfilm film studio. Afganli created costume designs for some performances of the Azerbaijan Russian Drama Theatre, some operas, films (The Tale of Love, Dada Gorgud, etc.), dance ensembles, and amateur art groups.

Many of Afganli's works are kept in the Azerbaijan State Theater Museum and the Moscow Central Theater Museum. She was awarded the Order of the Badge of Honor and various medals.

Badura Afganli died on 7 May 7, 2002, in Baku.

== Personal life ==
Badura Afganli was married to actor Rza Afganli. Their daughter Ophelia (1939–2010), who also became an actress, was married to actor Sayavush Aslan.

== Awards and honors ==
- Honored Art Worker of the Azerbaijan SSR (1949).
- Order of the Badge of Honor (1959).
- People's Artist of the Azerbaijan SSR (1974).
