= Titarenko =

Titarenko (Ukrainian or Russian: Титаренко) is a gender-neutral Ukrainian surname. Notable people with the surname include:

- Alexey Titarenko (born 1962), Russian photographer and artist
- Maria Titarenko (1917–2002), Azerbaijani Soviet opera singer
- Raisa Gorbachova (née Titarenko, 1932–1999), wife of former Soviet leader Mikhail Gorbachev
- Vyacheslav Titarenko (born 1978), Kazakhstani swimmer
- Yevgeny Titarenko (1935–2018), Soviet writer
