= The Meeting (1955 film) =

- Directed by: Tofig Taghizade
- Written by: Adham Qulubeyov
- Music by: Tofig Guliyev
- Production company: Azerbaijanfilm
- Release date: 1955
- Running time: 71,5 minutes
- Country: Soviet Union
- Languages: Russian; Azerbaijani

The Meeting (Azerbaijani: Görüş) is a 1955 Soviet romantic musical comedy-drama film about the love of an Uzbek woman and an Azerbaijani. The film premiered on August 6, 1956, in Moscow.

== Plot ==
The film tells about the friendship between competing collective farmers-cotton growers of Azerbaijan and Uzbekistan, in the center of which is the love of the Uzbek woman Lala and the Azerbaijani Kamil. The love of the protagonist of the film for the heroine of labor Lale turned him from a careless and lazy guy into a production leader.

== Cast ==
- Arif Mirzakuliev - Kamil
- Nellya Ataullaeva - Lala
- Leyla Badirbeyli - Bilgeis
- Hasanaga Salaev - Musa
- Munavvar Kalantarli – Minaver
- Aliagha Aghayev - Shikhali
- Aghahuseyn Javadov - Abulfas
- Barat Shakinskaya - Shovket
- Sona Aslanova - Firangiz (duplicated by Alexander Kharitonova)
- Aziza Mammadova - Aziza
- Mammadali Velikhanly - Chaychi
- M. Norbaev - Niyaz
- Fateh Fatullayev - Guluzade
- Susan Mejidova
- Mustafa Mardanov - Asker
- Mukhlis Janizade - Anwar
- R. Mirzoeva - Almaz
- Jabbar Aliyev - Sharip
