= Jafarzadeh =

Jafarzadeh or Jafarzade (Azerbaijani: Cəfərzadə, Persian: جعفرزاده) is an Azerbaijani and Persian language surname. Notable people with the surname include:

- Alireza Jafarzadeh
- Aziza Jafarzade
- Esmail Jafarzadeh
- Gholam Ali Jafarzadeh
- Ishag Jafarzadeh
- Mina Jafarzadeh
- Sa'id Jafarzādeh Homāy
- Sevinj Jafarzade
- Rza Afganli
