= Gambar =

Gambar is a name and may refer to:

- Abboud Gambar or Abboud Qambar, Iraqi General
- Gambar Zulalov (1895-1976), Azerbaijani khananda, actor and honored artist
- Isa Gambar (born 1957), Azerbaijani politician
- Sammy Gambar or Abdulraof Macacua, Filipino politician and minister
- Usta Gambar Karabakhi (1830s–1905), Azerbaijani ornamentalist painter

== See also ==
- 1957 Gambar train crash
