= Barat Shakinskaya =

- Barat Şəkinskaya
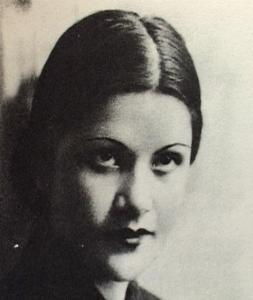
- Born: Barat Habib gizi Shakinskaya; June 28, 1914; Shusha, Russian Empire
- Died: January 14, 1999 (aged 84); Baku, Azerbaijan
- Occupation: Actress
- Spouse: Mehdi Mammadov
- Awards: People's Artiste of the Azerbaijan SSR (1949)

Barat Habib gizi Shakinskaya (Azerbaijani: Barat Həbib qızı Şəkinskaya; 28 June 1914 – 14 January 1999) was an Azerbaijani and Soviet stage and film actress.

== Biography ==
Barat Shakinskaya was born into a bey family in Shusha, Russian Empire (now Azerbaijan). Her mother Aghja (née Hajiyeva) was the niece of Azerbaijani writer and dramatist Abdurrahim bey Hagverdiyev. Her father hailed from the khans of Karabakh on his mother's side and from the khans of Shaki on his father's side. The name Barat means 'God-given', a name chosen by her grandmother Govhar, as Barat was the first surviving child in the family following her three still-born siblings. Later, Habib and Aghja Shakinskis became parents to two more children, Suleyman and Sariyya. Barat got primary education in Shusha. After the Eleventh Red Army annexed Azerbaijan in 1920, her father fled to Iran as a political immigrant, while her mother and the children relocated to Ganja and maintained contact with Habib Shakinski until 1928, when the Soviet-Iranian border closed and they were compelled to cease contact with him.

Shakinskaya participated in the female drama club of Ganja at the age of 13. In 1935, she began to play at the Azerbaijan State Academic Drama Theatre. Barat Shakinskaya became the first Azerbaijani actress to play male roles. The part of Kostya played by her at the Ganja Theatre and also Napoleon's part played in Baku, in 1934 were particularly noteworthy. The actress played children's roles too. The last children's role of Nazly, a pupil of the seventh grade from Mahammadhuseyn Tahmasib's play Blossoming Dreams, she played was while she was at the age of 37.

In 1935, Barat Shakinskaya began to participate in radio programs on the initiative of Mustafa Mardanov, People's Artist of Azerbaijan.

In 1949, she was conferred a title of People's Artiste of the Azerbaijan SSR.

Shakinskaya was married to director Mehdi Mammadov.

== Filmography ==
Year	Title	Role
1955	Meeting	Shovkat
1956	Not that one, then this one	Senem
1958	Shadows are crawling	Secretary
1957	Under the sultry sky	Sardarov's wife
1961	Weird story	Tukezban
1962	Telephonist girl	Zakir's mother
1978	A man in the house	Rovshan's mother
1980	His venturesome love	Grandmother

== See also ==
- List of People's Artistes of the Azerbaijan SSR
