= The Union of Theater Workers of Azerbaijan =

The Union of Theater Workers of Azerbaijan (Azerbaijani: Azərbaycan Teatr Xadimləri Ittifaqı) is a public organization that unites theater workers of Azerbaijan. The chairman of the Union is the People's Artist of Azerbaijan Azerpasha Nemat.

== History ==
The Union of Theater Workers of Azerbaijan was established in 1897. The original name of the organization was the "Union of Artists", which united about 300 artists. This organization, which continued its activities since 1917 as the "Union of Muslim Artists", since 1920 as the "Union of Turkish Actors", since 1948 as the "Azerbaijan Theater Society", was renamed the Union of Theater Workers of Azerbaijan according to decision of the founding conference on February 27, 1987.

The main goal of the Union of Theater Workers is to revive the theatrical process in the country.

== Modern period ==
During the years of independence, the Union organized theater festivals of various formats: "Monotamasha", "Him-Jim" (pantomime), "Experimental Performances", "Festival of Festivals", "National Classics", the Republican Festival of Young Directors, the festival of children's performances, the" Silk Road "Stage of the International Chekhov Festival" and others.

The Union of Theater Workers of Azerbaijan is a full member of the UNESCO International Theater Institute and the International Confederation of Theater Workers' Unions.

The Union has its branches in Nakhichevan, Ganja, Lankaran, and Sumgait.

Since March 2013, there has been a laboratory of young directors operating under the leadership of the People's Artist, Professor Jannat Salimova.

In November 2018, a Memorandum of cooperation was signed between the leadership of the Union of Theater Workers of Azerbaijan and the Theater Society of Georgia.

== See also ==
- Theatre in Azerbaijan
