= Aziza Mammadova =

Azerbaijani actress (1892–1961)

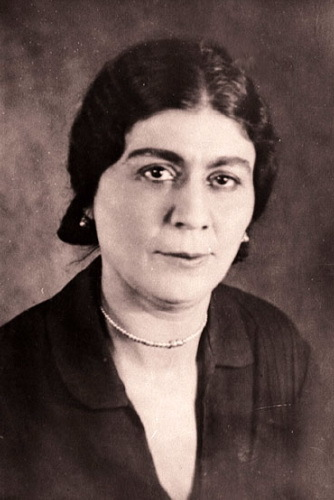
- Born: 1892; Tiflis, Tiflis Governorate, Russian Empire
- Died: August 14, 1961 (aged 68–69); Baku, Azerbaijan SSR, Soviet Union
- Occupation: Actress
- Years active: 1921–1961

Aziza Mammadova (Azerbaijani: Əzizə Məmmədova; 1892 – 14 August 1961) was an Azerbaijani and Soviet stage and film actress, one of the first actresses of the Azerbaijani theater and one of the first Azerbaijani film actresses, Honored Artist of the Azerbaijan SSR (1936).

== Biography ==
Aziza Abdulbaghi gizi Mammadova was born in 1892 in Tiflis in the family of the famous khanende singer Bulbuljan. Seeing his daughter's interest in music, her father taught her to play the accordion.

Later, Zulalov married off his daughter to Salman Hajiyev from Sheki. In 1907, the couple had a daughter, Sona, who in the future also became an actress and people's artist of the republic. A year later, Aziza's husband suddenly died and Aziza, together with her daughter, moved back to her father's house in Tiflis.

After some time, Zulalov, together with his daughter and granddaughter, moved to Ashgabat, and in 1919 to Baku. After the Soviet occupation of Azerbaijan in 1920, Aziza got a job at the Abilov Club, and later at the Ali Bayramov Women' Club.

Mammadova began her stage activity in the drama club at the women' club named after Ali Bayramov in Baku.

From 1921 to 1925 she was an actress of the Baku Free Satir Agitation Theatre. From 1925 to 1933 she performed on the stage of the Baku Turkic Workers' Theatre. In 1933, Mammadova became an actress at the Azerbaijan State Drama Theater.

On stage, Mammadova performed various roles. She became widely known primarily as the best performer of images of Azerbaijani women with national colorings.

In addition to the theater, the actress also starred in a number of feature films. On 1 February 1936, Aziza Mammadova was awarded the title of Honored Artist of the Azerbaijan SSR for her services on the stage of the theater. She was awarded the Order of the Red Banner of Labour and the Order of the Badge of Honour.

She died on 14 August 1961 in Baku.

== Personal life ==
- Spouse - Salman Hajiyev;
- Daughter - Sona Hajiyeva (1907-1979), a theater and film actress, People Artist of the Azerbaijan SSR.

== Roles played in the theater ==
- Tukaz ("Haji Kara" by M. F. Akhundov)
- Ziba ("Adventures of the Vezier of the Lankaran Khanate" by M. F. Akhundov)
- Hafiza ("Enchantress Peri" by A. Hagverdiyev)
- Fatmanisa ("Almas" by J. Jabbarly)
- Gulnisa ("Faded Flowers" by J. Jabbarly)
- Shahrabanu ("Yashar" by J. Jabbarly)
- Zalha ("Wedding" by S. Rahman)
- Sanam ("Eye Doctor" by I. Safarli)
- Vasilisa ("The Lower Depths" by M. Gorky)

== Filmography ==
Year	Film	Role
1929	Haji Gara	Gulsum, Sona's mother
1940	New Horizon	Fatma
1955	The Meeting	Aziza
1958	The Stepmother	Solmaz
