= Haji Gara =

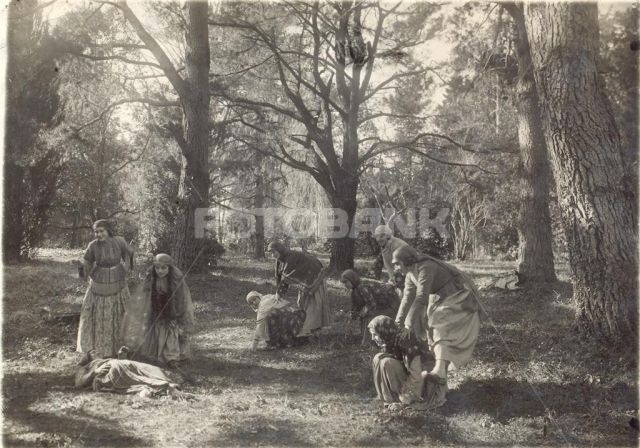
- Azerbaijani: Hacı Qara
- Directed by: Abbas Mirza Sharifzadeh
- Written by: Mirza Fatali Akhundov; Jafar Jabbarly
- Starring: Mirzaagha Aliyev; Mustafa Mardanov; Marziyya Davudova; Aziza Mammadova; Ali Gurbanov
- Music by: D. Jabari
- Production company: Azerbaijanfilm
- Release date: March 9, 1929
- Running time: 65 minutes
- Countries: Azerbaijan SSR, Soviet Union
- Language: Silent film

Haji Gara (Azerbaijani: Hacı Qara) is a 1929 Soviet adventure comedy-drama produced by the Azgoskino film studio, which is an adaptation of the play of the same name by Mirza Fatali Akhundov.

== Synopsis ==
The film tells about the life of peasants. On 3 October 1927, the script was read for the first time at the Azgoskino film studio. The director Abbas Mirza Sharifzadeh began preparations for filming in 1927. This film is the first in the career of Jafar Jabbarli as a screenwriter, the first work in the cinema of actors Aziza Mammadova and Ali Gurbanov. The film was released on 9 March 1929, in production the film was called Sona.

== Filmmakers ==
=== Cast ===
- Mirzaagha Aliyev - Haji Gara
- Mustafa Mardanov - Karamaly
- K. Vyaznova - Sona
- Aghasadyg Garaybeyli - Asger bey
- M. A. Gayyubov — Heydar
- Sidgi Ruhulla - Aliyar bey
- Marziya Davudova - Tukaz
- Y. Hajigasimov - Safaraly
- Hajiagha Shahbazov - Bayramali bey, Sona's father
- Aziza Mammadova - Gulsum, Sona's mother
- Rustam Kazimov
- N. Hasanov
- A. Mirzayev
- Ali Gurbanov - ashik
- Ashraf Yusifzade

=== Crew ===
- original text: Mirza Fatali Akhundov
- Screenwriter: Jafar Jabbarli
- director and editor: Abbas Mirza Sharifzadeh
- director of photography: Ivan Tartakovsky
- production designer: Alexander Goncharsky
- composer: D. Jabari
- artistic director: Vsevolod Pudovkin
- assistant director: Agharza Guliyev
