= Mirzali Abbasov =

Azerbaijani actor

- Born: Mirzali Haji Abbas oglu Abbasov; 1874
- Died: 3 November 1943 (aged 68–69); Tiflis, Georgian SSR, USSR
- Occupations: poet and journalist, publicist, writer

Mirzali Abbasov (Azerbaijani: Mirzəli Hacı Abbas oğlu Abbasov; born 1874, Russian Empire – d. Tiflis, Georgian SSR, USSR, 3 November 1943) was an actor of the Azerbaijani theater in Tiflis. Honored artist of the Republic (1924).

== Life ==
He made his debut in 1898 as Farrash in Mirza Akhundov's comedy "Adventures of the Lankaran Khanate Vizier". Performed in the Azerbaijani drama troupe in Tiflis, participated in tours in Tabriz, Tashkent and others. cities. He was one of the organizers, leading actor and director of the Azerbaijani theater in Tiflis since 1916. He played mostly tragic roles in a manner similar to the famous Azerbaijani actor Huseyn Arablinski. The most significant roles: Qajar in Hagverdiyev's historical tragedy "Aga Muhammed Shah Qajar", Othello in the tragedy of V. Shakespeare, Franz in the drama F. Schiller's "Robbers". Also he is the author of a number of plays.
