= Tagiyev's Theater =

Tagiyev’s Theater
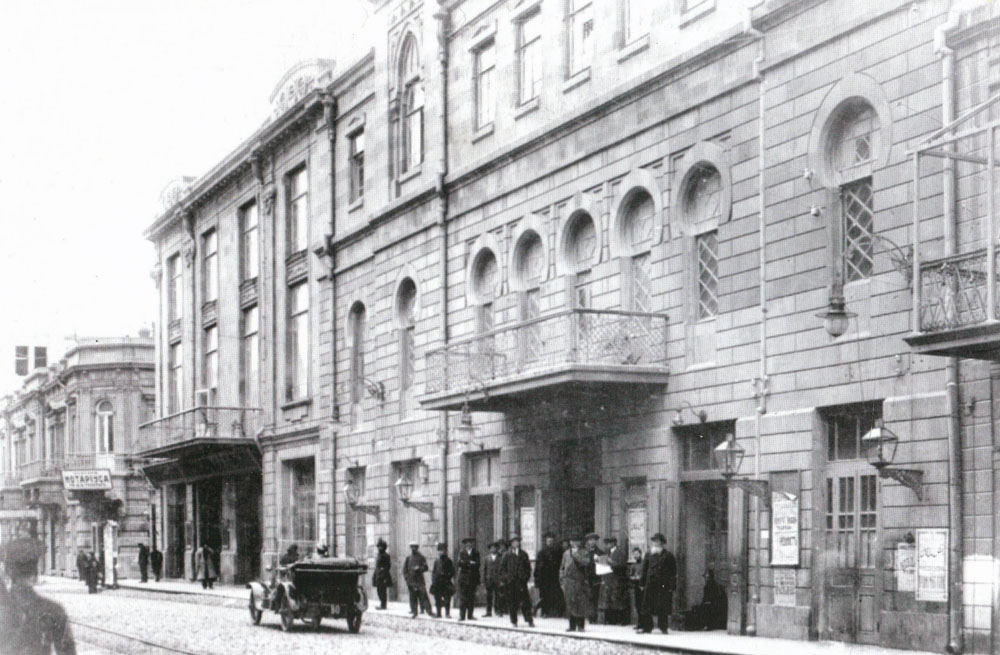
- Facade of the theater in 1913-1916
- Interactive map of Tagiyev’s Theater
- Address: at the corner of Gorchakovskaya and Merkurievskaya streets Baku; Azerbaijan
- Coordinates: 40°22′07″N 49°50′26″E
- Owner: Haji Zeynalabdin Taghiyev

Construction
- Built: 1882—1883
- Opened: January 27, 1883
- Architect: Khrisanf Vasilyev

"Taghiyev’s Theater" (Azerbaijani: Tağıyevin teatrı) is the first theater in Baku. It was built in 1883 at the expense of the industrialist and philanthropist Haji Zeynalabdin Taghiyev. It staged both national plays and operas, as well as the works of the world classics. Here, in January 1908, the premiere of the first Azerbaijani national opera "Leyli and Majnun", by Uzeyir Hajibeyov, took place.

The theater's building burned several times and was rebuilt anew. Since the late 1930s, the Azerbaijan State Drama Theater named after A. M. Azizbeyov, and since 1960 - the Theater of Musical Comedy in the name of Shikhali Kurbanov were located in its building. The theater's edifice was demolished in 1992, and the Azerbaijan State Musical Theater was later built in its place.

== History ==
=== Construction and opening ===
In 1882, H. Z. Taghiyev submitted for approval to the Baku City Government a project for a theater building to be raised on his own plot located in the center of Baku. The theater edifice was built in 1883. This is how a theater firstly appeared in Baku, and until 1911 it was the only theatrical building in the city. The architect was Khrisanf Vasilyev (according to his project and the building of the passenger station was raised in Baku).

The newspaper "Kaspi" reported on 20 November that the opening of the newly built theater building would follow. Later, on 25 November, the newspaper announced that the commission which examined the theater's building found it usable and that the first performance could take place on 27 November. Finally, on 27 November 1883, there was the H. Z. Tagiyev's Theater opening and the auditorium was full. The drama of N. A. Potemkin the “Poor in Spirit” was staged. The newspaper "Kaspi" noted:

Everything was played out successfully, the applauds did not stop, and the theater’s entrepreneur G. Goncharov was called to the stage twice.

=== Theater’s history in the late 19th-early 20th centuries ===
On 10 August 1890, an amateur performance was held at the Tagiyev's Theater for the poor students of the Real School. A comedy-joke in 4 acts by D. A. Mansfeld “On Shares” and a one-act vaudeville by P. A. Karatygin “Witzmunder” were staged with success. Even though, there was a strong stuffiness, the auditorium was almost full, and the funds raised amounted 300 rubles. The very premises of the theater were provided to the amateur actors free of charge.

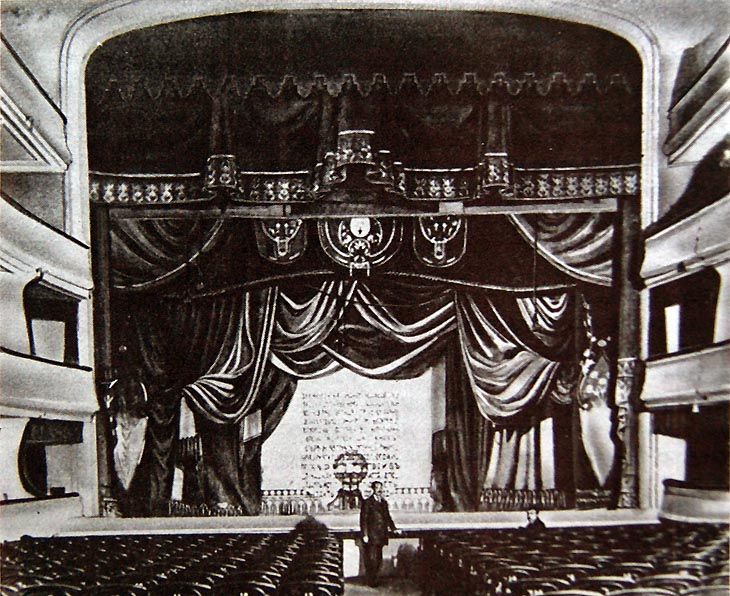
Tagiyev Theater's stage and auditorium in the beginning of the 20th century

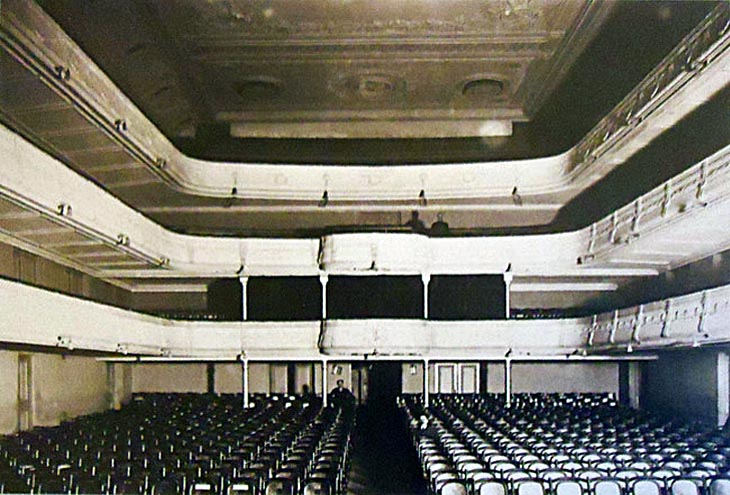

On 20 April 1898, the "Evil for good" play, by Iskender-bey Melikov, was shown by a troupe of amateurs at the Tagiyev's Theater. On 7 December of the same year, Najaf-bey Vezirov's play "Out of the rain and under the downpour" and his vaudeville "Home education" were staged for of the poor students of the Baku Real School.

On 8 December 1899, a fire broke out in the theater and at the end of that year, the renovation of the edifice was completed. The reconstruction was carried out based on the project of the civil engineer Pavel Kognovitsky, being approved by the Construction Department of the Baku Governorate. In 1900, the premises of the Tagiyev's Theater were restored. Before the fire, the office of H. Z. Tagiyev was also located in the theater's building, and after the reconstruction, it was transferred to another building.

In 1900, Nariman Narimanov wrote in his book the “Fiftieth Anniversary of Haji Zeynalabdin Tagiyev and his merits in front of people":

The activity of this reputable person leads people to the light of truth! It is amazing that although, probably, there are people in Baku richer and more educated than Tagiyev, it was the honorable Haji who built the first theater building here. Inquisitive young people of Baku several times a year get the opportunity to watch here comedies in a Turkic language. And although the rent is one hundred rubles per evening, the respected Haji often not only does not take it, but also makes additional contributions for charitable purposes. In 1900, he donated about one hundred thousand for the reconstruction of the theater, though a small theater, but an extraordinarily beautiful one.

On 12 (25) January 1908, the premiere of the first Azerbaijani national opera "Leyli and Majnun" by Uzeyir Hajibeyov took place at the Tagiyev's Theater.

On 1 February 1918, the theater's edifice burned down again as a result of a fire. All the wooden parts burned down, there only the stone and reinforced concrete frame survived. At the beginning of 1909, the building of the Tagiyev's Theater burned down as a result of another fire, and this aggravated the condition of the Azerbaijani troupe. So, on 21 February 1909, a barbershop located in the theater got fire, and soon it spread to all the premises of the building. There was no telephone in the theater and the fire brigade, which arrived 7 minutes later, was called from a neighboring house. The shipping company "Caucasus and Mercury" also took part in extinguishing the fire.

It was the largest fire in the history of the theater. This was featured in the "Molla Nasreddin" magazine of 1 March 1909. On the caricature, fanatics and clergy joyfully dance holding their hands. Huseyn Arablinsky, actor and director of the theater, in tears said to his friend actor standing next to him: “I portrayed the people’s grief on the stage for so many times, and, in the end, it fell on my head!”

In June 1909, the theater's owner, Haji Zeynalabdin Tagiyev, announced that he would rebuild the theater in the same place. The very next month, he proposed a project that no longer meant a two-story auditorium, but a three-story auditorium, as the theater attendance increased. According to Tagiyev's decision, there should be 600 more seats in the new edifice. On 1 October 1910, the theater was again opened to the audience with the Leo Tolstoy's play "The Fruits of Enlightenment".

Tagiyev subsequently leased the theater to his nephew Mammad Bagir Tagiyev, who, in his turn, leased it to other enterprises for a term of one, two or more seasons, providing then theater with the full technical staff.

On 13 May 1916, the premiere of Zulfugar Hajibeyov's opera "Ashig Garib" took place at the H.Z.Tagiyev's Theater.

On 1 February 1918, the theater's edifice burned down again as a result of a fire. All the wooden parts burned down, there only the stone and reinforced concrete frame survived.

=== Theater’s history after 1920 ===
In March 1921, a decision was made to restore the building of the former Tagiyev's Theater that burned down in 1918. By this time, only the facades were preserved. In 1922, the theater's edifice was renovated.

In the 1920s, the theater housed the Turkic State Theatre in the name of Buniyat-Zade, in the early 30s - the Turkic Art Theater named after Bunyat-Zade. Since the late 1930s, the Azerbaijan State Drama Theater in the name of A. M. Azizbeyov, and since 1960, when a new building was built for the State Drama Theater, the Musical Comedy Theater named after Shikhali Kurbanov were located there.

By the end of the 80s, the theater building fell into disrepair and began to collapse. In this regard, the city authorities decided to demolish the edifice in 1992. By 1996, the building of the Azerbaijan State Musical Theater was built on its site.

== The role of the Tagiyev’s Theater in the development of the theatrical art ==
The Tagiyev Theater played an important role in the development of the Azerbaijani theater. In the years when Tagiyev took up the development of the theatrical business, there was neither a theater school nor professional artists staff on the territory of Azerbaijan. The first performance in Azerbaijani was shown only ten years before the construction of the Tagiyev's theater in Baku. So, on 10 (23) March 1873, on the stage of the Baku Public Meeting, students of the Real School played a performance based on the play of M. F. Akhundov “The Vizier of the Lankaran Khanate”.

The tours of the Russian theater often took place in the premises of the Tagiev's Theater. The old Azerbaijani artists said that Tagiyev advised them to adopt the experience of Russian actors. According to the newspaper "Kaspi", dated with 5 December 1884, Tagiyev helped an amateur troupe of Azerbaijani artists, he rented them the theater's premises for free and did not take money for lighting. Tagiyev even found time to gather amateur artists, spent weeks staging performances, and gave the income received to the artists themselves.

The Tagiyev's Theater also contributed to the development of the Armenian theatrical society in Baku. For example, Tagiyev donated a part of the income from one of the performances staged at the theater to cover the deficit of the cash desk of the Armenian society. The director of the Armenian troupe Hovhannes Abelyan expressed the great merits of Tagiyev in the development of the Armenian theater:

We served the Armenian stage, we were aware of Your indisputable merits. Long live the first theater founder Haji Zeynalabdin Tagiyev.

== Literature ==
- Под ред. акад. АН АзССР И. А. Гусейнова, А. С. Сумбатзаде, канд. истор. наук А. Н. Гулиева, докт. истор. наук Е. А. Токаржевского. (1960). История Азербайджана. Vol. II. Baku: Издательство Академии наук Азербайджанской ССР.
- A.Sarabski (1965). К вопросу о налогах и поборах в дореволюционном театре Азербайджана. Vol. II. Baku: Искусство Азербайджана.
- A.Sarabski (1968). Возникновение и развитие азербайджанского музыкального театра (до 1917 г.). Baku: Издательство АН Азербайджанской ССР.
- İngilab Karimov (1991). Становление и развитие азербайджанского театра: Конец XIX — начала XX в. Baku: Elm. ISBN 5-8066-0219-2.
- A.Hajiyev (2000). Миллионер Тагиев Гаджи Зейналабдин (общественно-политические взгляды). Makhachkala.
