= Solmaz Gurbanova =

Azerbaijani actress (1939 – 2013)

Solmaz Gurbanova Solmaz Qurbanova
- Born: November 13, 1939; Baku, Azerbaijan SSR, USSR
- Died: June 4, 2013 (aged 73); Baku, USSR
- Occupation: actress
- Years active: 1955–2011

Solmaz Jabrayil gizi Gurbanova (Azerbaijani: Solmaz Cəbrayıl qızı Qurbanova / Солмаз Ҹәбрајыл гызы Гурбанова, IPA: [solˈmɑz ˈdʒæbɾɑjɯl ɡɯˈzɯ ˈɡuɾbɑnovɑ]; November 13, 1939—June 4, 2013) was an Azerbaijani actress, People's Artiste of Azerbaijan (1991).

== Biography ==
Solmaz Gurbanova was born in 1939 in Baku. Since 1955, she has been working at the Azerbaijan State Theatre of Young Spectators. She played the roles of teenage boys.

Solmaz Gurbanova died on June 4, 2013, in Baku.

== Awards ==
- People's Artiste of Azerbaijan — May 22, 1991
- Honored Artist of the Azerbaijan SSR — 1979
