= Ahmad Anatolly =

Azerbaijani theatre actor

- Əhməd Anatollu
- Born: October 7, 1894; Baku, Baku Governorate, Russian Empire
- Died: April 7, 1973 (aged 78); Baku, Azerbaijan SSR, USSR
- Citizenship: Russian empire Azerbaijan Democratic Republic; USSR
- Occupation: theater actor
- Years active: 1912
- Awards: Honored Artist of the Azerbaijan SSR Order of the Badge of Honour

Ahmad Mukhtar oghlu Safarov (Azerbaijani: Əhməd Muxtar oğlu Səfərov; November 7, 1894 – April 7, 1973) was an Azerbaijani theatre actor. He was awarded the title Honored Artist of the Azerbaijan SSR.

== Biography ==
Ahmad Anatolly was born on November 7, 1894, in Baku. He first appeared on the stage in 1912 in the play "Gachag Karam" (Vano Mchedashvili) prepared by Huseyn Arablinski in the theater troupe of the "Safa" cultural and educational society. He played in the troupe "Nijat", in the performances of the theater group "Administration of brothers Zulfugar bey and Uzeyir Hajibeyov". He toured with the leading actors of his time to the big cities of Central Asia, the Turkic-speaking cities along the Volga, Iran, Rasht, Bandar-e Anzali, Tehran.

Ahmad Safarov is one of the first artists in the genre of national variety theater. "Anatolly" is his stage nickname. In 1922–1925 he worked as an actor at the Baku Turkish Free Criticism and Propaganda Theater, in 1923–1924 at the Azerbaijan State Drama Theater. In 1926 he was admitted to the staff of the Tbilisi State Turkish Drama Theater, in 1927 he returned to Baku and worked at the Azerbaijan State Variety, Azerbaijan State Opera and Ballet Theater. From 1939 to 1949 he worked at the Azerbaijan State Theatre of Musical Comedy, and from 1949 until his retirement at the Azerbaijan State Philharmonic.

Ahmad Anatolly died on April 7, 1973, in Baku.

== Awards ==
- Honored Artist of the Azerbaijan SSR – April 23, 1940
- Order of the Badge of Honour — April 17, 1938
- Medal "For the Defence of the Caucasus" — 1946
- Medal "For Valiant Labour in the Great Patriotic War 1941–1945"

== Literature ==
- Anatollu, Əhməd (2017). Əlli il Azərbaycan səhnəsində. Bakı: Ecoprint. ISBN 978-9952-31-097-7. OCLC 1020794143.
- Rəhimli, İ. (2016). Azərbaycan Teatr Ensiklopediyası. Vol. 1–3. Bakı: Azərnəşr. ISBN 978-9952-8306-3-7.
