= Rza Afganli =

Azerbaijani actor (1899–1973)

- Azerbaijani:Rza Rüstəm oğlu Cəfərzadə
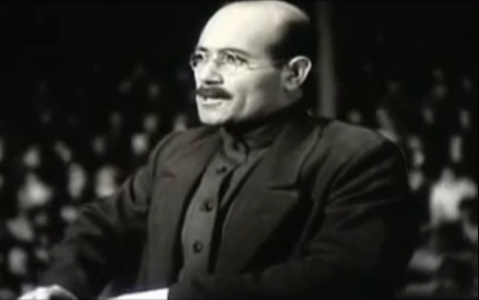
- Rza Afganli in 'Peasants'
- Born: Rza Jafarzade; May 15, 1899; Sarab, Qajar Iran
- Died: November 9, 1973 (aged 74); Baku, Azerbaijan SSR, Soviet Union
- Spouse: Badura Afganli (wife)

Rza Rustam oglu Afganli (real surname Jafarzade; 1899–1973) was a Soviet Azerbaijani actor, People's Artist of the Azerbaijan SSR (1943) and Laureate of the Stalin Prize (1948).

== Life ==
Rza Jafarzade was born on May 15, 1899, in the village of Ogan, near Sarab in northwestern Qajar Iran. He began his stage career in the Baku Mobile Workers' Theater. From 1923, he was an actor at the Azerbaijan State Academic National Drama Theatre named after Mashadi Azizbeyov. In the years 1923–1926, he studied at the Baku Theater Technical School. Rza Afganli died on November 9, 1973, in Baku.

== Activity ==
List: Roles in the theater

- 1929 — Mikhail Yarovoy in Konstantin Trenyov's Lyubov Yarovaya
- 1932 — Iago in William Shakespeare's Othello
- 1934 — Heydar in Oleksandr Korniychuk's Death of the squadron
- 1937 — Mercutio in William Shakespeare's Romeo and Juliet
- 1938 — Eldar in Samad Vurgun's Vagif
- 1939 — Sergey Sergeyevich Paratov in Alexander Ostrovsky's Without a Dowry
- 1940 — Nabi in Suleyman Rustam's "Qachaq Nabi"
- 1941 — Edmund in William Shakespeare's King Lear
- 1947 — Farhad in Anvar Mammadkhanli's "Morning of the East"
- 1950 - Muravyev Boris Chirskov's "Winners"

Filmography

- 1938 — Cafar in "Bakuvians"
- 1939 — Abas in Peasants"
- 1965 — Suleyman in "Twenty-six Baku commissars"
- 1967 — Sarkhan in "Duel in the mountains"
- 1968 — Vahidov in "In the name of the law"
- 1972 — Shumal in "Life tests us"

== Awards ==
List:

- Honored Artist of the Azerbaijan SSR (1938)
- Order of the Badge of Honour (1939)
- People's Artiste of the Azerbaijan SSR (1943)
- Stalin Prize (1947)
- Order of Lenin (1949)
- Order of the Red Banner of Labour (1959)

== Family ==
He established a family life twice. His daughter Khumar Zulfugarova (1927-2017), became a dancer, choreographer, and People's Artist of the Azerbaijan SSR (1979). In the second time, Rza was married to actress Badura Afganli (People's Artiste of the Azerbaijan SSR (1974), and Honored Art Worker of the Azerbaijan SSR (1949)). Their daughter Ophelia (1939–2010), who also became an actress, was married to actor Sayavush Aslan.

== Works cited ==
- Quliyev, Cəmil (1980). Azerbaijani Soviet Encyclopedia. Baku: Adiloğlu.
