= Aghasadyg Garaybeyli =

Azerbaijani actor

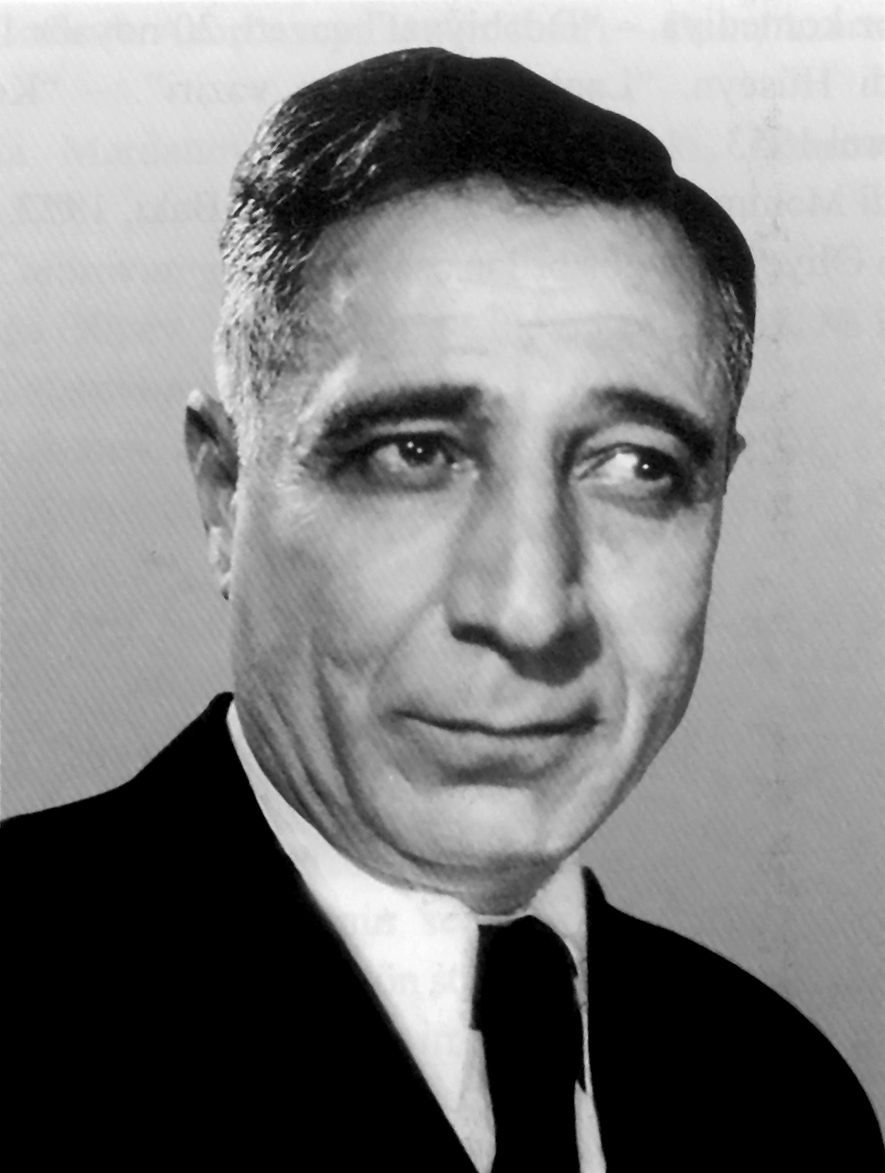

Aghasadyg Aghaali oglu Garaybeyli (Azerbaijani: Ağasadıq Gəraybəyli) (15 March 1897, Shamakhi – 5 December 1988, Baku) was a Soviet and Azerbaijani actor.

== Life and contributions ==
Garaybeyli was born in the city of Shamakhi, but like many natives of that city at the time, he found himself in Baku after the devastating earthquake of 1902. Garaybeyli became an orphan at a young age and was brought up by a foster family. While still in school, he started attending drama clubs for actors-to-be established by Huseyn Arablinski. He made his first stage appearance in 1917. Beginning in 1921, with the help of Uzeyir Hajibeyov, he started attending courses in professional acting. It was also when Garaybeyli got married. In the following years, he acted in over 200 different roles, including both stage and film appearances. Garaybeyli was also known as a voice actor in a number of movies. From 1933 until the end of his life, he worked in the Azerbaijan State Academic National Drama Theatre. In 1940 he was awarded the title of People's Artiste of the Azerbaijan SSR.

He died in Baku, at age 91.

== Filmography ==
- The Maiden Tower (1924), as Ayan
- Haji Gara (1929), as Asgar bey
- Sevil (1929), as Balash
- Fatali Khan (1947), as Sardar's envoy
- Bakhtiar (1955), as Aghabala
- If Not This One, Then That One (1957), as Rustam bey
- Under the sultry sky (1957), as Sardarov
- Leyli and Majnun (1961), as Ibn Khalid
- Life Is Beautiful, Brother! (1967), as Shukru bey
- The Mail Box (1967), as the Khan
- Stars Don't Go Out (1971), as Gendarme
- The Boys of Our Street (1973), as Rustam kishi
- Aghasadyg Garaybeyli (1974), as himself
- The Tour (1975), as CEO (not credited)
- The Graduate Thesis (1979), as the Reeve
- I Am Composing a Song (1979), as Abdulla
- The Prayer (1982), as the Mullah
- The Grandchild of My Grandchild's Grandchild (1985), as the Grandfather

== See also ==
- List of People's Artistes of the Azerbaijan SSR
