= Mammadtaghi Baghirov =

Azerbaijani-Soviet opera singer (1890–1961)

Mammadtaghi Baghirov Məmmədtağı Bağırov
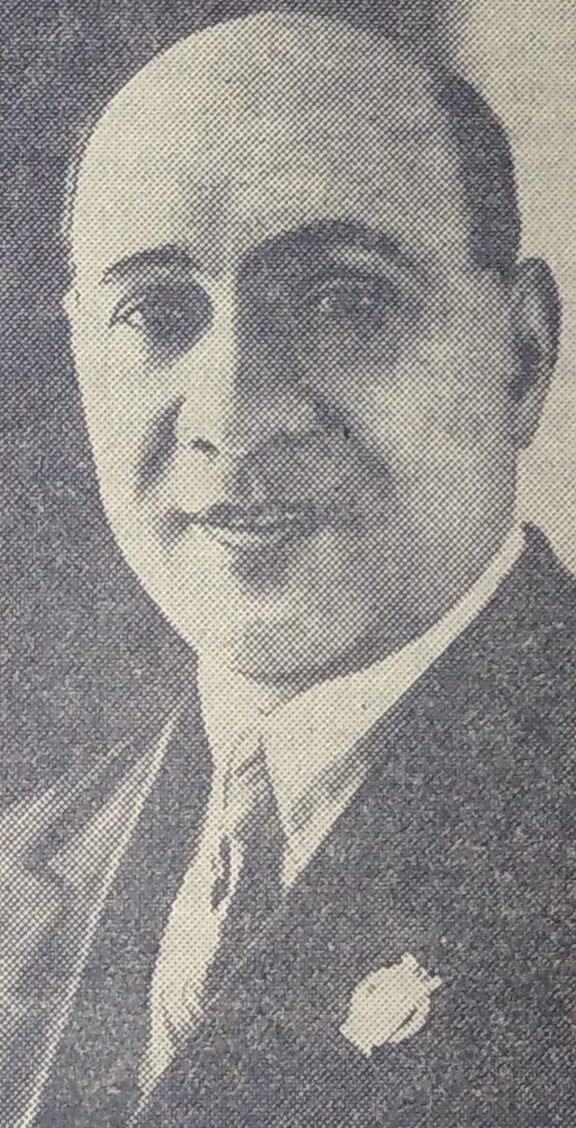

Background information
- Born: August 5, 1890; Baku, Baku Governorate, Russian Empire
- Died: April 16, 1961 (aged 70) Baku, Azerbaijan SSR, Soviet Union
- Genres: Opera
- Occupation: Singer
- Awards: Order of the Red Banner of Labour Order of the Badge of Honour

Mammadtaghi Abbas oghlu Baghirov (Azerbaijani: Məmmədtağı Abbas oğlu Bağırov, August 5, 1890 – April 16, 1961) was an Azerbaijani-Soviet opera baritone, soloist of the Azerbaijan State Opera and Ballet Theater, and People's Artiste of the Azerbaijan SSR (1938).

== Biography ==
Mammadtaghi Baghirov was born in 1890 in Baku. He studied at a mollakhana (Muslim ecclesiastical school) for two years, then studied at a progressive Russian-Tatar school for five years. He appeared on the stage for the first time in 1909, as part of the chorus in the opera "Leyli and Majnun" by Uzeyir Hajibeyov, performed in the "Nicat" theater troupe, in addition, he played episodic roles in drama and comedy performances. The singer had been performing as a soloist since 1914.

In 1914–1919, Mammadtaghi Baghirov performed in the theater troupes "Safa", "Muslim Opera Artists" created by Huseyngulu Sarabski, "Management of the brothers Zulfugar Bey and Uzeyir Bey Hajibeyov". He took the nickname "Aragi" from his teenage years. In some program posters, his pseudonym was given as "Iraqi".

Mammadtaghi Baghirov worked in the opera troupe of Azerbaijan Drama Theater since 1920. In 1925, when the collective left the Azerbaijan Drama Theater and transferred to the Russian Opera, Mammadtaghi Baghirov joined the new theater troupe.

== Awards ==
- Honored Artist of the Azerbaijan SSR — May 25, 1934
- Order of the Red Banner of Labour — April 17, 1938
- People's Artiste of the Azerbaijan SSR — December 4, 1938
- Medal "For the Defence of the Caucasus"
- Medal "For Valiant Labour in the Great Patriotic War 1941–1945"
- Order of the Badge of Honour
