= Khumar Zulfugarova =

Azerbaijani dancer and choreographer (1927–2017)

- Born: Khumar Rza gizi Zulfugarova; 15 November 1927; Baku
- Died: 2 July 2017 (aged 89); Baku
- Occupations: Dancer, choreographer
- Known for: Founder of the Azerbaijan State Dance Ensemble
- Awards: Honored Artist of the Azerbaijan SSR (1959), People's Artist of Azerbaijan (1979), Shohrat Order (2009)

Khumar Rza gizi Zulfugarova (Azerbaijani: Xumar Rza qızı Zülfüqarova;15 November 1927, Baku – 2 July 2017, Baku) was an Azerbaijani dancer, choreographer, founder of the Azerbaijan State Dance Ensemble. She was awarded the title Honored Artist of the Azerbaijan SSR (1959), People's Artist of the Azerbaijan SSR (1979), and Chevalier of the Order of Glory (2009).

== Life ==
Khumar Zulfugarova was born on 15 November 1927 in Baku in the family of prominent theatre and film actor Rza Afganli. In 1945, she graduated from the Baku School of Choreography. From 1945 to 1966, Zulfugarova was a soloist of the Azerbaijan State Academic Opera and Ballet Theater. Since 1950, she began teaching at the Baku School of Choreography. During her 60 years of teaching, Zulfugarova educated several generations of dancers and choreographers.

== Career ==
In 1958, Zulfugarova starred in the Georgian film "Mamluk," where she performed an Arabic dance surrounded by six soloists of the Georgian Opera and Ballet Theater. In 1959, she was invited to stage and dance a solo in the new production by Uzeyir Hajibeyov for the "Days of Azerbaijani Culture" in Moscow and had great success there. Upon her arrival from Moscow in Baku, Zulfugarova was awarded the title of Honored Artist of Azerbaijan.

From 1966 to 1978, Zulfugarova was a soloist and artistic director of the Song and Dance Ensemble of the Azerbaijan State Philharmonic. She was the creator of the State Dance Ensemble (1969–1978). Zulfugarova developed a dance program, with which the ensemble toured in Ukraine, Denmark, France, etc.

Zulfugarova was the first chief choreographer of the State Association of Tours and Concerts (1978-1988). Zulfugarova danced in Uzeyir Hajibeyli's opera "Koroglu", performed in Gara Garayev's ballet "Seven beauties" and acted in movies. She performed as a dancer in the operas "Shah Ismail", "Ashig Garib", "Asli and Karam", "Leyli and Majnun". She toured in various cities in Russia, Iraq, the United States, and Canada and has demonstrated and promoted professional Azerbaijani dance.

In 1979, Zulfugarova was awarded the title of People's Artist of the Azerbaijan SSR.

Since 1992, Zulfugarova was an artistic director of the Dzhangi ensemble. The ensemble took part in Fuzuli's anniversary in Baghdad in 1994 toured the United States (New York, Chicago, Washington) and Canada (Toronto and Montreal) in 1995.

In 2009, Zulfugarova was awarded the Shohrat Order (Order of Glory). Having worked over 60 years, she retired in 2011.

Khumar Zulfugarova died on 2 July 2017 in Baku at the age of 89.

In November 2017, Zulfugarova's 90th anniversary was celebrated at the Azerbaijan State Theatre Museum.

== Filmography ==
- Fatali khan (film, 1947)
- Mamluk (film, 1958)
- Arshin mal alan (film, 1965)
