= Maria Titarenko =

Azerbaijani Soviet opera singer

- Born: Maria Sergeevna Titarenko; 27 March 1917; Sevastopol, Russian Soviet Federative Socialist Republic
- Died: 26 September 2002 (aged 85); Baku, Azerbaijan
- Occupations: Opera singer, soprano
- Notable work: "Arshin Mal Alan" (1945)

Maria Sergeevna Titarenko (27 March 1917 – 26 September 2002) was an Azerbaijani Soviet opera singer of Ukrainian origin. She was awarded the title Honored Artist of the Azerbaijan SSR (1961). She is best known for voicing Gulchohra in the film "Arshin Mal Alan" (1945).

== Life ==
Maria Titarenko was born on 27 March 1917 in Sevastopol, Russian Empire. At the age of 3, she became an orphan after her father died and her mother remarried living her and five other children. At the age of 14, Titarenko graduated from the seven-year school, where she studied the language of the Crimean Tatars. After that, she graduated from a factory school and began to work at the factory. Working at the factory Titarenko fulfilled 300% of the norm and nobody could break her record.

In 1936, Titarenko married the head of one of the factory shops, Nikolai Naida who was soon recruited to the Baku Shipyard. Together with her husband, Titarenko came to Azerbaijan in 1937.

In February 1938, Titarenko was admitted to the Baku Musical College without exams. During her study at the college, she separated with her first husband Nikolai Naida, who was recruited to work in Murmansk, and met a military pilot Vasily Koretsky, who soon went to the war and died.

== Singing career ==
While working at the factory Titarenko participated in amateur performances, singing Oksana in the opera by the Ukrainian composer Semen Hulak-Artemovsky “Zaporozhets beyond the Danube”. She won three times in city amateur competitions in Sevastopol and in the All-Crimean Amateur Olympiad in Simferopol.

After graduating from Baku Musical College in 1942, Titarenko was transferred to study at the conservatory.

In 1943, Titarenko became a soloist of the Baku Opera House. She appeared on the stage of the Baku Opera House in the role of Nigar.

In 1945, Titarenko voiced Gulchohra performed by Leyla Badirbeyli in the film "Arshin Mal Alan".

In the 1950s and 1960s Titarenko became the prima of the Baku opera scene. During her 25 years of stage work she sang 36 leading roles, including Nigar, Tatiana, Iolanta, Mikaela and Snegurochka. She performed six roles in Azerbaijani language.

In 1961, Titarenko was awarded a title of an Honored Astist of Azerbaijan SSR.

She left the stage in 1969, but her voice of the prima remained until the age of 84 when she still performed a part in the opera Vagif.

Maria Titarenko died on 26 September at the age of 85 in Baku, and was buried in Baku.
