= Fatma Mehraliyeva =

Azerbaijani singer and actress

- Born: Fatma Yusif gizi Mehraliyeva; 4 June 1926; Guba, Azerbaijan
- Died: 4 January 2000 (aged 73); Baku, Azerbaijan
- Occupations: singer, actress
- Awards: Honored Artist of Azerbaijan SSR (1956)

Fatma Yusif gizi Mehraliyeva (Azerbaijani: Fatma Yusif qızı Mehrəliyeva; 4 June 1926, in Guba – 4 January 2000, in Baku) was an Azerbaijani singer and actress. She was awarded the title Honored Artist of the Azerbaijan SSR (1956).

== Early life ==
Fatma Mehraliyeva was born on 4 June 1926 in Guba, Azerbaijan. Her mother died when she was just 3–4 years old and she was brought up by her aunt Asmagul, who lived in Ispik village of Guba region. In high school, Mehraliyeva was very active in singing lessons and the teachers sent her to Baku to participate in a music festival. There 11-year-old Mehraliyeva singing a folk song “Guba’s White Apple” attracted attention of composer Uzeyir Hajibeyov. The composer created conditions for Mehraliyeva to study music and became her protector.

== Career ==
In 1940, Mehraliyeva began her career in the ensemble “Sazchy gyzlar” (“Composer girls”) where she soon became a soloist. From 1941 to 1945, she performed in front of the soldiers on the front lines. The songs she performed during the Great Patriotic War are included in the Gold fund of the national radio of Azerbaijan.

In 1945, Mehraliyeva played the role of Telli in the film "Arshin mal alan".

In 1956, she was awarded a title of Honored Artist of the Azerbaijan SSR. Mehraliyeva sang "Kesme shikesta" mugham, "Guba's white apple", "Azerbaijani deer", "Like Ahu" and others.

According to her relatives Mehraliyeva left the scene in the early 1990s.

Fatma Mehraliyeva died on 4 January 2000 in Baku.

== Filmography ==
- Arshin mal alan (film, 1945)
- Life of Uzeyir (film, 1981)
