= Mustafa Mardanov =

Soviet actor (1894–1968)

- Mustafa Haşım oğlu Mərdanov
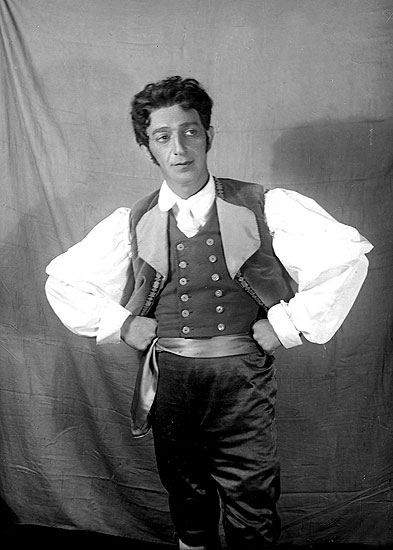
- Mardanov as Figaro, 1940
- Born: Mustafa Hashim oghlu Mardanov; 10 March 1894; Marand, East Azerbaijan, Qajar Iran
- Died: 28 December 1968 (aged 74); Baku, Azerbaijani SSR, Soviet Union
- Burial place: Alley of Honor
- Education: Moscow State Institute of Theater Arts
- Alma mater: Tiflis Men's Gymnasium
- Occupation: Actor
- Years active: 1910–1968
- Awards: People's Artiste of the Azerbaijan SSR

Mustafa Hashim oghlu Mardanov (Azerbaijani: Mustafa Haşım oğlu Mərdanov, Russian: Марданов, Мустафа Ашум оглы; March 10, 1894 – December 28, 1968) was a Soviet and Azerbaijani stage and film actor. He was the People's Artiste of the Azerbaijan SSR of 1943.

== Biography ==
Mustafa Mardanov was born on March 10, 1894, in the city of Marand in East Azerbaijan, Persia (now Iran). He was the brother of the film director Samad Mardanov. In 1916 he graduated from the Tiflis Men's Gymnasium. From 1922 to 1924 he studied at the Moscow State Institute of Theater Arts.

His stage activity began in 1910 in the Tiflis Muslim Drama Circle. His first roles in the theater were the roles of Haji Ganbar ("From the rain and under the downpour" by Najaf-bek Vezirov), Karamali ("Haji Kara" Mirza Fatali Akhundova), Adham ("Nadir Shah" Nariman Narimanov). From 1921 to 1922 Mardanov was the director of the Tiflis Azerbaijani Theater.

Since 1924 he has been performing on the stage of the Azerbaijan State Drama Theater. Here he created a series of images of Azerbaijani, Russian and Western drama. Mustafa Mardanov was noted for his subtle humor and comedy. A bright folk comedy was combined in the art of Mardanov with subtle humor and irony. Mustafa Mardanov was surrounded by the great actors of Azerbaijan, such as Abbas Mirza Sharifzadeh, Sidgi Ruhulla, Agasadig Garaybayli, Alasgar Alakbarov, from whom he learned a lot. His best roles are Atakishi, Imamverdi (Sevil, 1905 Jafar Jabbarly), Khlestakov ("Inspector General", Nikolai Gogol), Luka ("At the bottom" Maxim Gorky), Shmaga ("Without fault" Alexander Ostrovsky), Polonius ("Hamlet", William Shakespeare), Shvandiya (Love for spring, Konstantin Trenev), Sganarelle (" Don Juan", Molière), etc.

Mustafa Mardanov was one of the first Azerbaijani movie actors. The role of "Muzdur Gulu" was the first role of M.Mardanov in the film "Bismillah". This film was the first director's work of Abbas Mirza Sharifzade, which was an example of silent film (1925). Mustafa Mardanov played in such films as "In the Name of God", "Haji Gara", "Sevil", "Lyatif", "Baku People", "Kandlilar", "Sabuhi", "Black Stones", "Morning", "Meeting", "Where is Ahmed?" and others. Mardanov was very popular with the role of intelligent Hasan-bek in the film "Not that, so this". The first significant role of M.Mardanov in the cinema is the role of Karamali in the film "Haji Gara". In general, in most films shot from the late 1920s to early 30s, M. Mardanov was given the role. The high actor's talent of Mustafa Mardanov is evidenced by the film shot by his brother, the film director Samad Mardanov, "Peasants" in which M. Mardanov played two opposing roles. In 1943 he was awarded the title of People's Artist of the Azerbaijan SSR. Since 1945 - a member of the CPSU. From 1962 to 1968, Mardanov was chairman of the Azerbaijan Theater Society. He translated a number of plays into Azerbaijani. In 1959, his book "50 Years on the Azerbaijani Stage (My Memories)" was published in Baku. One of the streets of Baku is called the Mardanov Brothers in memory of Mustafa Mardanov and his brother Samad Mardanov.

He died in Baku, and was buried in the Alley of Honor.

== Filmography ==
- Aghasadig Geraybeyli (film, 1974)
- Theatrical artists of Azerbaijan (film, 1966)
- The Baku People (film, 1938)
- Bakhtiyar (film, 1955)
- Bismillah (film, 1925)
- Where is Ahmed? (Film, 1963)
- Labor and the Rose (film, 1962)
- Fatali Khan (film, 1947)
- Meeting (film, 1955)
- Haji Gara (film, 1929)
- 26 Commissars (film, 1932)
- Peasants (film, 1939)
- For the Sake of the Law (film, 1968)
- Black Stones (film, 1956)
- Latif (film, 1930)
- On different banks (film, 1926)
- Not that, this one (film, 1956)
- Romeo is my neighbor (film, 1963)
- Sevil (film, 1929)
- Sabuhi (film, 1941)
- The Morning (film, 1960)
- House on Vulcan (film, 1929)
- New Horizon (film, 1940)

== Awards ==
- Honored Artist of the Azerbaijan SSR (1935)
- People's Artiste of the Azerbaijan SSR (1943)
- Two Orders of the Red Banner of Labour (1949, 1959)
