= Azerbaijan State Theatre Museum =

Theatre museum in Baku, Azerbaijan

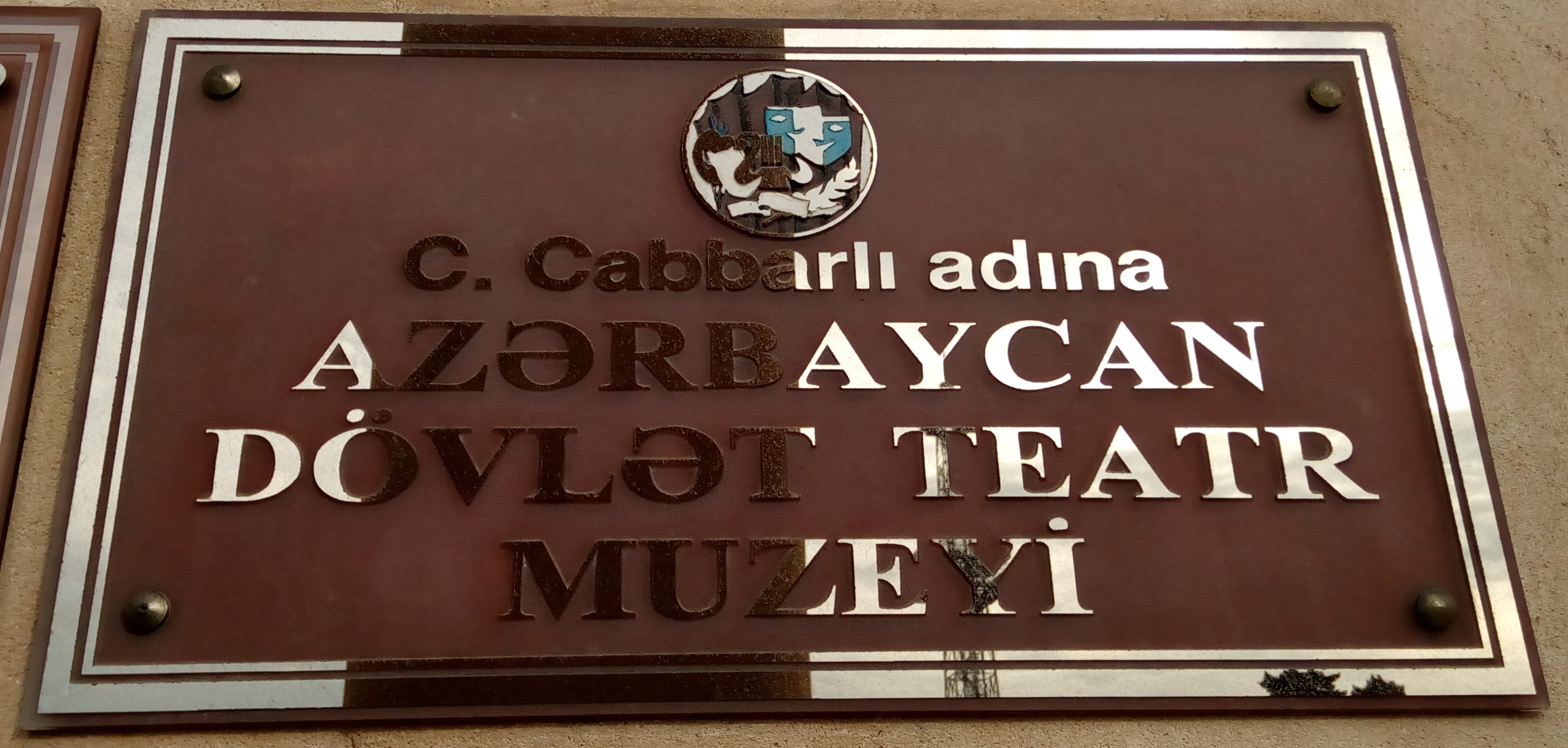
- Established: 1934
- Location: 123а Neftchilar Ave; Baku, AZ1000; Azerbaijan
- Coordinates: 40.369775°N 49.842625°E
- Collection size: approx. 135000
- Director: Sevinj Sadaddin Mikhailova

Azerbaijan State Theatre Museum (Azerbaijani: Azərbaycan Dövlət Teatr Muzeyi) named after Jafar Jabbarli reflects the professional theatre history of Azerbaijan. In 1934, the issue of establishing such a museum was raised at the Republican conference by theater workers. The museum was organized in the same year in the building of the Azerbaijan State Drama Theater. In fact, this exhibition was the foundation of a future museum. According to eyewitnesses, Jalil Mammadguluzadeh and Abdurrahim bey Hagverdiyev, the great writers who cut the opening ribbon of the exhibition, said: "Long live the Azerbaijani theater!"

The exhibition is soon officially formalized as a Theater Department of the Azerbaijan State Museum. Finally, on the basis of the relevant department of the Azerbaijan State Museum in 1934, the Azerbaijan State Theater Museum was established and Aghakarim Sharifov was appointed the director of the museum.

On 25 November 1934, the solemn opening ceremony of the museum was held. Famous art figures such as Bulbul, Shovkat Mammadova, Huseyngulu Sarabski, Alexander Tuganov, Ulvi Rajab, Ismayil Hidayatzade and others attend the event.

In 1935, the museum was named after Jafar Jabbarli, the great Azerbaijani playwright.

In 1963, the Azerbaijan State Theatre Museum was annulled and became the Theater and Drama Department of the Azerbaijan Literature Museum named after Nizami.

In 1968, the Government of the Republic made a decision on the organization of the Azerbaijan State Theater Museum named after J. Jabbarli on the basis of this department. The rooms on the 4th floor of the building of the Azerbaijan Literature Museum named after Nizami are given to the newly created museum. In these rooms, it was possible to place only the museum stock and employees. The most remarkable transformation in the history of the Azerbaijan State Theater Museum took place in 1991. After the Baku branch of the central V.I.Lenin Museum was given to Ministry of Culture of Azerbaijan, the "Museum Center" was created here, along with the State Museum of Carpet and Applied Art and the Museum of Independence of Azerbaijan, the State Theater Museum placed in this building. The Museum Center is located on the seaside Boulevard.
