= Sona Hajiyeva =

Azerbaijani actress (1907–1979)

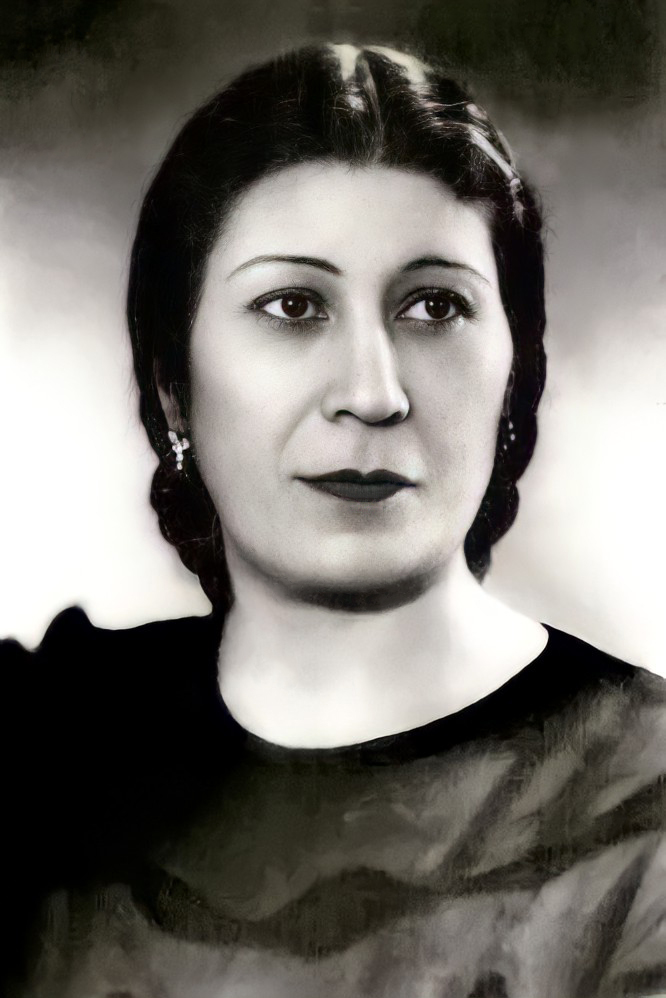
- Born: June 25, 1907; Shaki, Nukha uezd, Elizavetpol Governorate
- Died: December 24, 1979 (aged 72); Baku, Azerbaijan Soviet Socialist Republic
- Occupation: actress
- Years active: 1921-1979

Sona Hajiyeva (Azerbaijani: Sona Hacıyeva; 25 June 1907, Nukha, Caucasian governorship - 24 December 1979, Baku) was an Azerbaijani Soviet theater and film actress, one of the first actresses of the Azerbaijani theater, she was awarded the honorary title of People's Artiste of the Azerbaijan SSR (1949).

== Biography ==
Sona Salman gizi Hajiyeva was born on 25 June 1907 in Nukha in the family of the Azerbaijani actress Aziza Mammadova, who in turn was the daughter of the famous khanende singer Abdulbaghi Zulalov. She began her staging career in 1921 at the Azerbaijani State Satir-Agit Theater in Baku (nowadays the Academic Russian Drama Theater named after Samad Vurgun). From 1923 to 1979 she was an actress of the Azerbaijan Drama Theater named after Mashadi Azizbayov.

Until 1927, Hajiyeva played in dramatic performances and performed parts in musical performances, but then she began to play only in dramatic performances. On stage, Sona Hajiyeva created lyrical images of loving and ingenuous girls. One of the best roles of Hajiyeva is Almas in the play of the same name by Jafar Jabbarli in 1931. Later, Hajiyeva played roles that are marked by a bright everyday character.

She starred in the films “Bakhtiar ” (1955, director L. Safarov), “If not that one, then this one” (1956, director H. Seyidzade), “Under the Hot Sky” (1957, director L. Safarov), and “Morning” (1960, director A. Guliyev).

In 1949, Sona Hajiyeva was awarded the title of People's Artiste of the Azerbaijan SSR. She was awarded with the Order of Badge of Honor and medals.

== Roles in the theater ==
- Leyli ("Leyli and Majnun" by U. Hajibeyov);
- Shah-Senem ("Ashig Garib" by Z. Hajibeyov);
- Sona ("Haji Gara" by M. F. Akhundov)
- Nazli ("Dead Men" by J. Mammadguluzade)
- Susan ("Namus" by A. Shirvanzade);
- Barbara ("The storm" by A. Ostrovsky);
- Anna ("The Lower Depths" by M. Gorky);
- Maria ("Twelfth Night" by W. Shakespeare);
- Nisa Khanum ("Shirvan Beauty" by E. Mammadkhanly);

== Filmography ==
Year	Film	Role
1925	In the name of God	Scene
1955	Favorite song	Zahra
1956	If not that, so this one	Scene
1957	Under the sultry sky	Village woman
1960	Morning	Aslan's mother
1962	I will dance	Cloakroom attendant
1962	Telephone operator	Grandma Mehriban
