= Ramiz Guliyev =

Azerbaijani musician (1947–2025)

Razim Guliyev
- Ramiz Quliyev
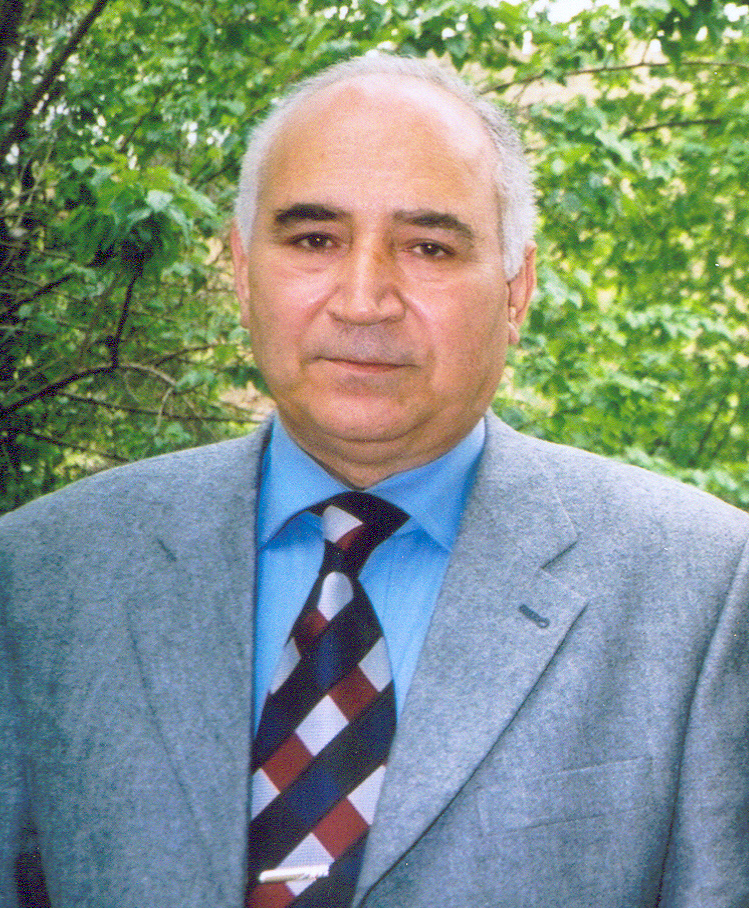
- Guliyev in 2007
- Born: Ramiz Ayyub oglu Guliyev; 30 April 1947; Aghdam, Azerbaijan SSR, USSR
- Died: 15 October 2025 (aged 78); Baku, Azerbaijan
- Education: Baku Academy of Music
- Occupation: Musician

Ramiz Ayyub oglu Guliyev (Azerbaijani: Ramiz Əyyub oğlu Quliyev; 30 April 1947 – 15 October 2025) was an Azerbaijani mugham musician.

== Life and career ==
Born in Aghdam on 30 April 1947, Guliyev attended the Baku Academy of Music, where he later became a professor. From 1992 to 2002, he directed its folkloric instruments department. His primary instrument was the tar, a string instrument native to the Caucasus, which he played at several international folk music festivals.

In 2017, he was awarded the Sharaf Order, and received the Jubilee medal "100 years of Heydar Aliyev (1923–2023)" in 2023.

Ramiz Guliyev died in Baku on 15 October 2025, at the age of 78.
