= Leyla Badirbeyli =

Leyla Bədirbəyli
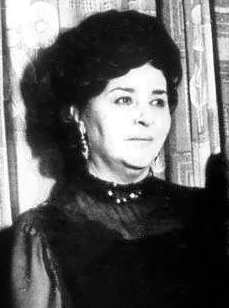
- Leyla Badirbeyli in 1982

Background information
- Born: 8 January 1920; Baku, Azerbaijan Democratic Republic
- Died: 23 November 1999 (aged 79) Baku, Azerbaijan

Leyla Aghalar gizi Badirbeyli and Leyla Badirbeyova – (after marriage, Javanshirova; Azerbaijani: Leyla Ağalar qızı Bədirbəyli (Cavanşirova)); (1920–1999), Soviet and Azerbaijani actress of theatre and cinema, People's Artiste of the Azerbaijan SSR (1959), laureate of the State Stalin Prize of the second degree (1946), member of the CPSU from 1945. She is buried in the Alley of Honor.

== Biography ==
Leyla Badirbeyli was born on 8 January 1920 in Baku, in the family of Aghalar Badirbeyov, from the generation of Shamkir beys. In 1936, she became the soloist of the Song and Dance Ensemble of Azerbaijan, where she worked until 1942. In 1942, under the guidance of the Azerbaijan State Drama Theatre, named after Meshadi Azizbeyov's invitation, she began to perform on the stage of this theatre. Later she narrated:

"Theatre is related to me with the names of such coryphaeus as Mehdi Mammadov, Adil Isgenderov, Aliheydar Alakbarov. My activity in cinema and theatre was in wartime, but in spite of that, these years were very productive in the world of arts and also for me…"

In 1945, Bedirbeyli played Gulchohra's part from "Arshin mal alan" musical comedy. Henceforth, she played memorable roles in such films as "Fatali khan", "Meeting", "Shadows are crawling", "Her great heart", "Koroghlu", "Indomitable Kura", "Sevil", "Boys of our street", "One fine day", "Dervish is blowing up Paris" etc. In 1951, Leyla Badirbeyli graduated from Azerbaijan State Theatrical Institute named after M.A.Aliyev. Badirbeyli married Fərəc Cavanşirov, a Javanshir noble descended from Ibrahim Khalil Khan. The two had a son named Javanshir, known as Elhan. The couple split up later in life.

The actress died on 23 November 1999.

== Filmography ==
Year	Title	Role
1937	Wild crowd	
1941	Sabuhi	Tubu khanim
1942	Souvenir	
1945	The Cloth Peddler	Gulchohra
1947	Fatali khan	Tuti-bike
1955	Meeting	Bilgeyis
1958	Her great heart	Khalida
1958	Shadows are crawling	Leyla
1960	Koroghlu	Nigar
1969	Indomitable Kura	Zarnigar
1970	Waiting	Mother
1970	Sevil	Tafta
1972	Cherry tree	
1973	Boys of our street	Leyla
1974	In the tracks of Charvadars	Marfuza
1975	Light of slaked fires	
1976	The Darvish Detonates Paris	Shakhrabanu khanim
1977	One fine day	Mother
1977	I am going to volcano	Gulsum
1978	I am composing a song	Nadir's mother
1983	Asif, Vasif, Agasif	
1987	Men's word	
1988	Man for a young woman	
1990	Trap	Gunel’s grandmother
1991	Gazalkhan	
1992	I'll burn in the fire of cleansing	Zahra’s aunt
1993	Hello from the other world	Fatma of Karbala

== Awards ==
- State Stalin Prize of the second degree (1946) – for playing Gulchohra's role in the film "Arshin mal alan".
- State Premium of the Azerbaijan SSR, named after Mirza Fatali Akhundov (1972)
- People's Artiste of the Azerbaijan SSR (1959)

== See also ==
- List of People's Artists of the Azerbaijan SSR
