= Sayavush Aslan =

Azerbaijani actor

Səyavuş Aslan
- Born: Səyavuş Məmmədağa oğlu Aslanov; September 5, 1935; Baku, Azerbaijani SSR, Soviet Union
- Died: June 27, 2013 (aged 77); Baku, Azerbaijan
- Occupation: Actor
- Years active: 1954–2011
- Children: Chingiz Aslan

Sayavush Aslan (Azerbaijani: Səyavuş Aslan; September 5, 1935 – June 27, 2013) Azerbaijani prominent cinema and theatrical actor, rewarded with Sheref Order and People’s Artist of Azerbaijan Republic.

== Biography ==
One of the prominent members of the Azerbaijan realistic artist movement, Aslanov Sayavush Mammadaga oglu, was born September 5, 1935, in Baku. He began his career as an amateur actor in theatrical circles. For a short time, he worked in a troupe of musical comedy in 1954 and Guba Academic Drama Theatre. People's Artist of the Azerbaijan Republic, Sayavush Aslan, died on June 27, 2013. He was a leading actor of Azerbaijan State Theatre of Musical Comedy. He worked as an artistic director in this theater for a short period and was a skillful performer of several characters.

== Roles ==
Sayavush Aslan was an actor of Azerbaijan State Academic Drama Theatre since 1984 and performed different roles.

- Bayram ("Kəndimizin mahnısı", K. Kərimov)- (Song of our village)
- İbishov ("Özümüz bilərik", Ş. Qurbanov)- (Ourselves know)
- Furzuzbala ("Altı qızın biri Pəri", M. Əlizadə)-(Peri is one of the six girl)
- Shubay ("Ulduz")
- Dadashbala ("Hicran", S. Rəhman),
- Qamzali ("Qaçırılmış qız", C. Məmmədov) (Abducted girl)
- Misir Nasir ("Lənət sənə, kor şeytan", F. Aşurov) (Devil take it )
- Orduxan bey ("Əlli yaşında cavan", Z. Hacıbəyov) (Young man of fifty years old)
- Mindilli ("Nişanlı qız", S. Rəhman),(Engaged girl)
- Luka ("Həyatın dibində", M. Qorki), (Depth of life)
- Ağaəli ("Günah", R. Əlizadə), (Sin)
- Romul Avqust ("Böyük Romul", F. Dürrenmatt),(Great Romul)
- Oddamdı ("Od gəlini", C. Cabbarlı),(Bride of fire)
- Farish ("Bizim qəribə taleyimiz", İ. Əfəndiyev), (Our strange destiny)
- Cabbar ("Sevgililərin cəhənnəmdə vüsalı", İ. Əfəndiyev), (Sweethearts coupling in the hell)
- Agamusa Faracov ("Dəlilər və ağıllılar", İ. Əfəndiyev),( Sensible and mad men)
- Vanya Koxa ("Hökmdar və qızı", İ. Əfəndiyev),(The ruler and girl)
- Qarib Qulam ("Mənsiz dünya", N. Xəzri),( World without me)
- Asdulla ("Ah, Paris…Paris!..", Elçin), (Oh, Paris… Paris!)
- Kişi ("Mənim ərim dəlidir", Elçin), (My husband is mad)
- Baş redaktor ("Mənim sevimli dəlim", Elçin), (My favourite mad)
- Yoldaş tək ("Poçt şöbəsində xəyal", Elçin), (Dream in the post office)
- Polony ("Hamlet", U. Şekspir),
- Sarı ("Varlı qadın", Ə. Əmirli), (Rich woman)
- Aqabo Boqveradze ("Kaş araba aşmayaydı!..", O. İoseliani) (If wagon would not turn over)

He played more than a hundred roles in TV shows. He was rewarded with Honored Artist in 1974, and People's Artist in 1982, according to his efficient performances in cinema and theater. He was also a pensioner of the president and was rewarded the “Sheref” Order on June 25, 2013. After serious illness, he died on June 27, 2013.

== Filmography ==
1. 100 (film, 1985) (short film-Mozalan № 100)
2. № 777 (film, 1992) (full-length feature film)
3. Adam ol! (Be a man!) (film, 2005) (full-length feature film)-character: Səyavuş
4. Adam ol! 3 (Be a man!) (film, 2007) (full-length feature film)(Lider TV)
5. Adı sənin, dadı mənim (Name is yours, taste is mine) (film, 1980) (full-length TV show)(Aztv)
6. Aktrisanın təbəssümü (Smile of actress) (film, 1974)
7. Bankir adaxlı (Banker boyfriend)(film, 2008)
8. Belə lazımdır (It is required so)(film, 1982)
9. Bəyin oğurlanması (Abduction of bridegroom) (film, 1986)
10. Bizim qəribə taleyimiz(Our strange destiny) (film, 2005)
11. Cin mikrorayonda (Jinn in micro-district) (film, 1985)
12. Dəvətnamə (Invitation) (film, 2003)
13. Evlənmək istəyirəm (I want to marry) (film, 1983)
14. Evləri göydələn yar (Home of lover is skyscraper) (film, 2010)
15. Evləri köndələn yar (Home of lover is athwart) (film, 1982)
16. Əhməd haradadır? (Where is Ahmed?) (film, 1963) - character: beard Ramiz
17. Əzablı yollar (Poignant ways) (film, 1982)
18. Fırıldaqçı (Cheater) (film, 1983)
19. Hacı Qara (Haci Qara) (film, 2002)
20. Xüsusi vəziyyət (Special situation) (film, 1986)
21. Köç (Miqration) (film, 1986)
22. "Qayınana" əməliyyatı (Operation of "Mother-in–law") (film, 1999)
23. Qəm pəncərəsi (Grief window) (film, 1986)
24. Qırmızı qatar “Red train” (film, 1993)
25. Mən sənin dayınam “I am your uncle” (film, 2001)
26. Mənim ağ şəhərim “My white city” (film, 1994)
27. Musiqi müəllimi “Music teacher” (film, 1983)
28. Nakəs “Dishonest person” (film, 1991)
29. O dünyadan salam (Greeting from that world) (film, 1992)
30. Romeo mənim qonşumdur (Romeo is my neighbor) (film, 1963)
31. Sabiqlər (Formers) (film, 1999)
32. Sabiqlərin yeni sərgüzəştləri (New adventures of formers)(film, 2000)
33. Sevdagül və Şarlotta (Sevdagul and Sharlotta) (film, 1986)
34. Səhər (Morning) (programme 1995)
35. Sehrli çıraq (Magical lamp) (film, 1987)
36. Ulduz (film, 1964)
37. Ünvansız eşq (Love without an address) (2011)
38. Üzr istəyirəm (I apologize) (film, 1985)
39. Yaşıl eynəkli adam (Man in green glasses) (film, 1987)
40. Yaşıl eynəkli adam-2 (Man in green glasses -2) (film, 1999)
41. Yaxşı qurtardıq (We finished well) (film, 1985)
42. Yay gününün xəzan yarpaqları (Autumn leaves of summer day) (film, 1986)
43. Yeganə çıxış yolu (Only way out) (film, 1980)
44. Yol əhvalatı (Way story) (film, 1980)
45. Yuxu (Dream) (film, 2001)
