= New Horizon (film) =

- Directed by: Grigory Braginsky; Aga-Rza Kuliev
- Written by: Imran Kasumov
- Produced by: Mukhtar Dadashev; Fedor Novitsky
- Starring: Ismail Efendivev; Rza Afganli; Alesker Alekperov; Ali Gurbanov
- Cinematography: Anton Zenkovich
- Edited by: Anton Komrakov
- Music by: Niyazi
- Production company: Baku Film Studio
- Release date: December 29, 1940
- Running time: 83 minutes
- Country: Soviet Union
- Language: Russian/Azerbaijani

New Horizon (Yeni horizont) is a 1940 Soviet drama produced by the Baku Film Studio (the Azerbaijani SSR's state film production company), starring Ismail Efendivev, Rza Afganli, Alesker Alekperov, and Ali Gurbanov.

== Plot ==
The film tells about the life of Baku oil workers and the discovery of new oil fields. The conflict in the film is based on the contradiction of inertia, conservatism and ahamism, which are the remnants of anility, with its innovative idea in the world of science.

== Cast ==
- Ismail Efendiev as Adil Kərimov
- Rza Afganli as Professor Əhmədov
- Alesker Alekperov as Partiya təşkilatçısı Aslanov
- Ali Gurbanov as Heydər
- Sofa Bashirzade as Validə
- Aziza Mamedova as Fatma
- Movsun Sanani as Ruben
- Mustafa Mardanov as Trest müdiri
- Ali-Sattar Melikov as Rüstəm Abbasov
- V. Chavchavadze as Tibb bacısı

== Production ==
- Written by: Imran Kasumov
- Directed by: Aga-Rza Kuliev, Grigory Braginsky
- Photography directors: Fyodor Novitsky, Mukhtar Dadashov
- Music by: Niyazi
- Sound engineer: Ilya Ozersky
- Lyricist: Aliaga Wahid
- Assistant stage manager: Latif Safarov, Mamed Alili (the latter is uncredited)
- Assistant cameraman: Teyyub Akhundov
- Cutter and assistant stage manager: Zeinab Kazimova

== Sources ==
- Şəmsəddin Abbasov. “Sovet Azərbaycanının kinosu” //Kommunist.- 1958.- 29 avqust.
- Azerbaijan SSR cinematography. Cinema: Encyclopedical dictionary / Сhief editor S. I. Yutkevich; Editorial board: Y.S. Afanasyev, V.E.Baskakov, I.V. Vaysfeld and others. — Moscow: Soviet Encyclopedia, 1987. — page 12.
- Azerbaijan SSR cinematography. Cinema: Encyclopedical dictionary / Сhief editor S. I. Yutkevich; Editorial board: Y.S. Afanasyev, V.E.Baskakov, I.V. Vaysfeld and others. — Moscow: Soviet Encyclopedia, 1987. — page 222.
- Azərbaycan SSR Elmlər Akademiyası. Memarlıq və İncəsənət İnstitutu. Nazim Sadıxov. "Ağarza Quliyev haqqında qeyd". Azərbaycan bədii kinosu (1920-1935-ci illər). Bakı: Elm, 1970.- səh. 26
- Azərbaycan Respublikası Mədəniyyət Nazirliyi. C.Cabbarlı adına "Azərbaycanfilm" kinostudiyası. Aydın Kazımzadə. Bizim "Azərbaycanfilm". 1923-2003-cü illər. Bakı: Mütərcim, 2004.- səh. 63-64.
- Azərbaycan Milli Ensiklopediyası: Azərbaycan. Ramiz Məmmədov. Kino. Azərbaycan Milli Ensiklopediyası Elmi Mərkəzi, 2007.- səh. 813.
