= Alasgar Alakbarov =

Azerbaijani actor

- Ələsgər Ələkbərov
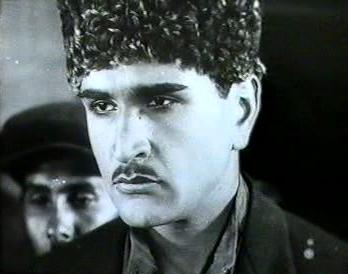
- Alakbarov in Latif (1930)
- Born: March 26, 1910; Baku, Baku Governorate, Russian Empire (present-day Azerbaijan)
- Died: January 31, 1963 (aged 52); Baku, Azerbaijani SSR, Soviet Union
- Occupation: Actor

Alasgar Hajiagha oghlu Alakbarov (Note: Azerbaijani: Ələsgər Hacıağa oğlu Ələkbərov; Russian: Алескер Гаджи Ага оглы Алекперов, romanized: Alesker Gadzhi Aga ogly Alekperov) (26 March 1910 – 31 January 1963) was a Soviet and Azerbaijani actor.

== Career ==
He was born in Baku to a family of a poor merchant. He developed a passion for acting and music while still a child by watching street performances and listening to dervishes' singing. In 1920 his father died and he along with his siblings were raised by his mother the tailor. Until age 15 he attended a drama club where he learned basics about acting and theatre.

Alasgar Alakbarov received his postsecondary education at a performance arts college in Baku in 1930. During the next three years, he worked with the troupes at various Azeri theatres in Azerbaijan and Georgia. Starting in 1933 until his death, he worked at the Azerbaijan State Academic National Drama Theatre. He specialized mostly in tragical roles. His most famous roles were those of Vagif (Vagif by Samad Vurgun) and Othello (Othello by William Shakespeare). During his 30-year career he played Vagif around 700 times. Critics characterised his performance as extremely spirited and emotional.

Along with theatre, Alakbarov also pursued a career in film. Alakbarov's first movie appearance was made in Vulkan uzarinda ev in 1929. He also starred in renowned Azerbaijani films such as Latif, Almaz, Kandlilar, Ogey ana, Uzag sahillarda, Boyuk dayaq, etc. In 1961 Alakbarov became People's Artist of the USSR after participating in a 1959 cultural event in Moscow dedicated to the Azerbaijan Soviet Socialist Republic. Alakbarov died in Baku.

== Family ==
Alakbarov was shortly married to actress Hokuma Gurbanova. In 1934 their only daughter Naila was born.

== See also ==
- List of People's Artists of the Azerbaijan SSR
