= Theatre of Azerbaijan =

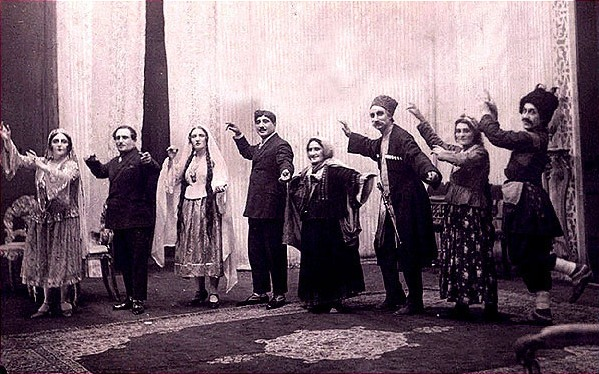
A scene from Arshin Mal Alan comedy in Azerbaijan State Academic Opera and Ballet Theater. 1929/29

Azerbaijani theatre (Azerbaijani: Azərbaycan teatrı) – is a theatrical art of the Azerbaijani people.

== History ==
Sources of Azerbaijani theatrical art lie on holidays and dances.

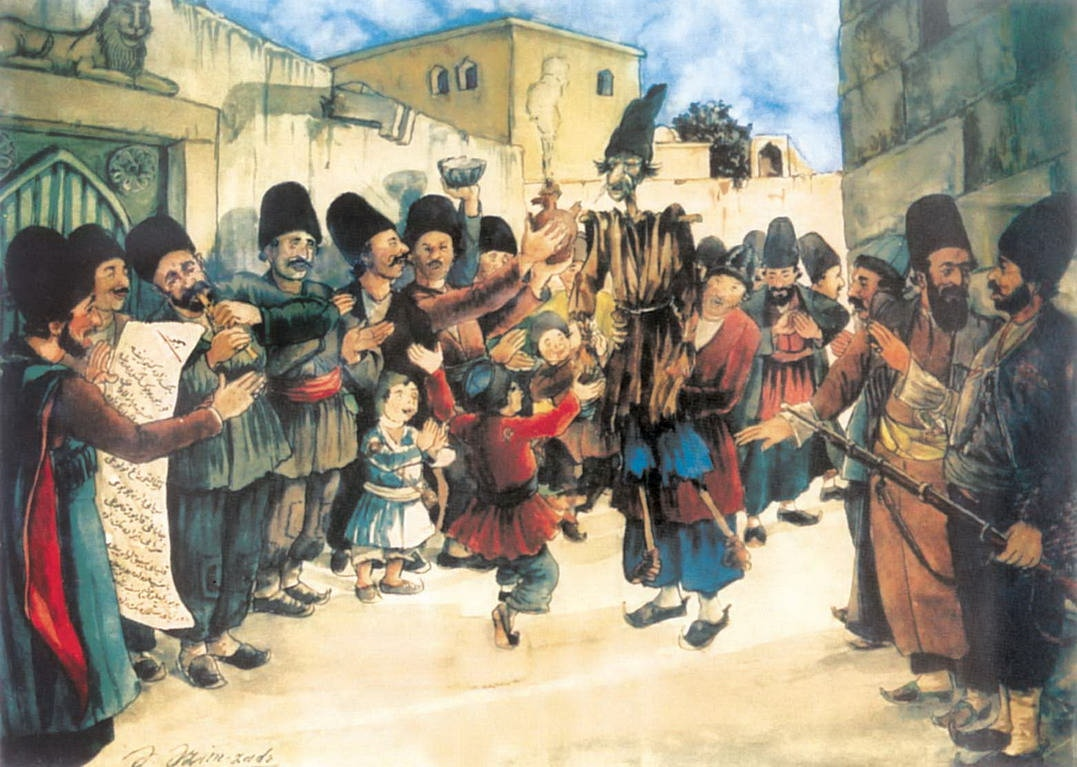
National "Kos-kosa" show. Painter Azim Azimzade, 1930

Elements of theatrical action are in many types of Azerbaijani people's creativity — in games (gizlanpach – hide-and-seek, kosaldigach – polo game), game songs (kepenek – butterfly, banovsha – violet), wedding traditions (nishan – engagement, duvakhgalma – taking bride's veil off, toy – wedding) and holidays (Nowruz – spring's coming, kev-sej – preparation for winter).

Collective male dance yally, performance of skomorokhs, kandirbazs (rope-walkers), mukhraduzds and mukhrabazs, spectacles of dervish and snake charmers are initial forms of theatrical spectacles. Broadly famed national scenes such as Kosa-kosa, Garavelli, Shah Selim, Kechal pahlavan (Bald-headed strong), Jeyran khanim (Mrs. Jeyran), Maral oyunu (Deer's game), “Kaftarkos” (Hyena), Khan-khan (Ruler and judge), Tapdig choban (Shepherd Tapdig) and Tenbel gardash (Lazy brother) were of great importance in formation of national Azerbaijani theatre. Kilim arasi (Out of carpet) puppet theatre, in spectacles of which ugly appearances of everyday life, social inequality and injustice were ridiculed, is an ancient type of Azerbaijani theatrical art.

Religious-mystic spectacles were widely spread in the Middle Ages. Dramatized Shabih tradition, which was generally held in sorrowful Muharram month, is one of spectacles like that.

== Origination of the national Azerbaijani theatre — late 19th century, early 20th century ==
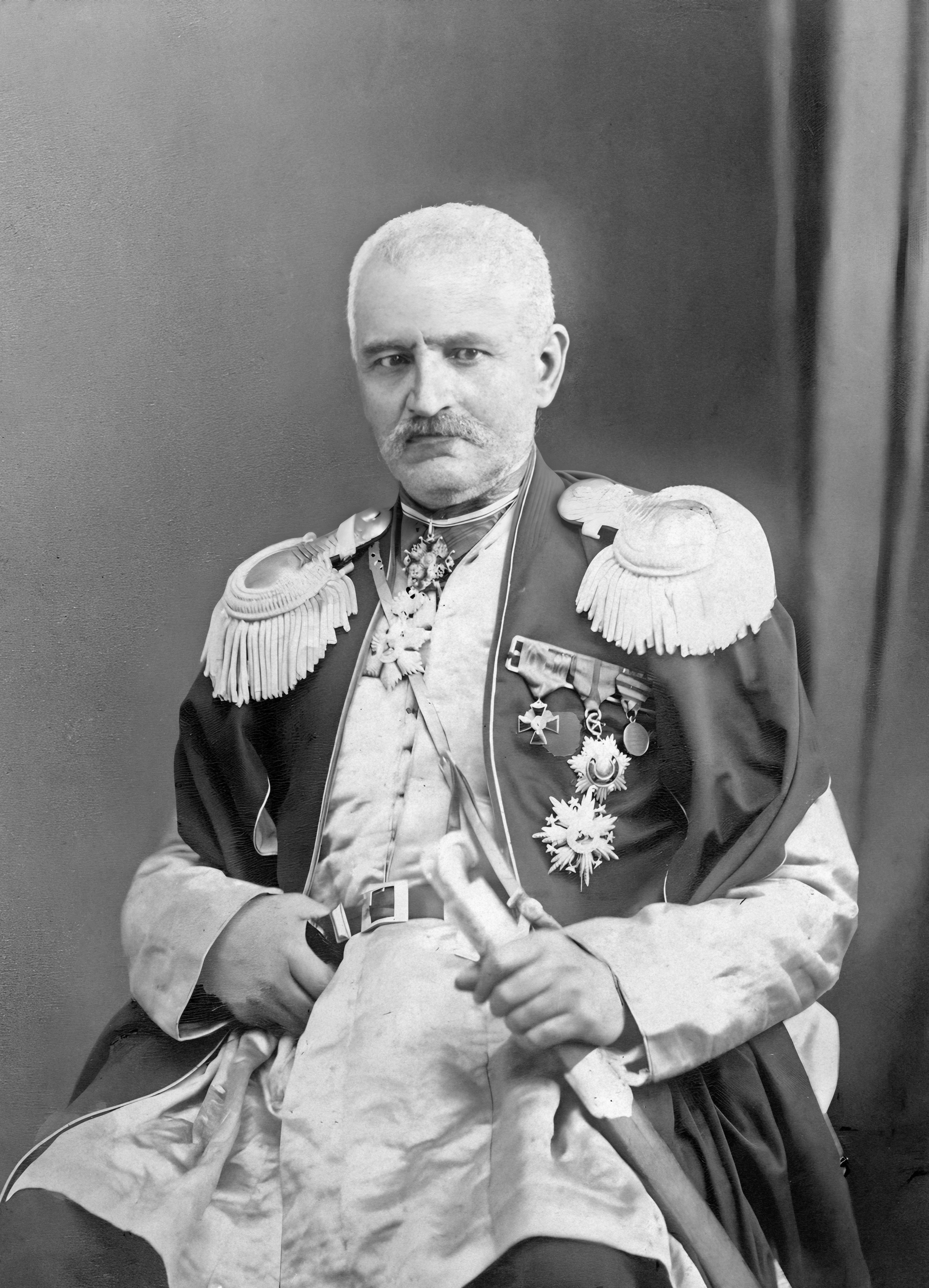
Mirza Fatali Akhundov

National Azerbaijani theatre was originated in the second half of the 19th century, on the basis of a comedy by Mirza Fatali Akhundov, the first Azerbaijani playwright, prominent thinker and philosopher of Azerbaijan.

The first professional spectacle in Azerbaijani language was displayed on March 23, 1873. Hasanbay Malikov-Zardabi, pedagogue of real school and Najafgulu bey Vazirov, student of the school were initiators of the spectacle. Students of the real school played “Adventures of the Lankaran Khanate Vizier” play by M.F.Akhundov on the stage of Baku Public Assembly. The second spectacle Haji Gara (The Adventures of a Miserby M.F.Akhundov, was displayed on the hall of Baku Public Assembly, on April 17, 1873. Organization of professional theatre and staging of spectacles in Baku was stopped after the first spectacles. Zardabi was busy with creation of Akinchinewspaper, and Najaf bey Vazirov went to Russia for education. Opening of real school in Shusha in 1881, and elementary female school in 1894, also opening of a musical school by musical critic Kharrat Gulu and involvement of young singers there aroused interest of local intelligentsia in theatre. So, amateurish spectacles were staged by young pedagogues in Shusha, during summer holidays. In the first years, the repertoire consisted of M.F.Akhundov's works.

New education newspaper wrote on August 17, 1884:

These days, amateur theatregoers of Shusha displayed a spectacle in the native language for the third time for a charitable purpose. Initially, Mastali Shah, comedy, then Haji Gara, and yesterday Vizier of Lankaran Khanate were staged. Soon they'll get together to display Monsieur Jordan comedy. All of them are written by Mirza Fatali Akhundov, prominent man among Caucasian Muslims.

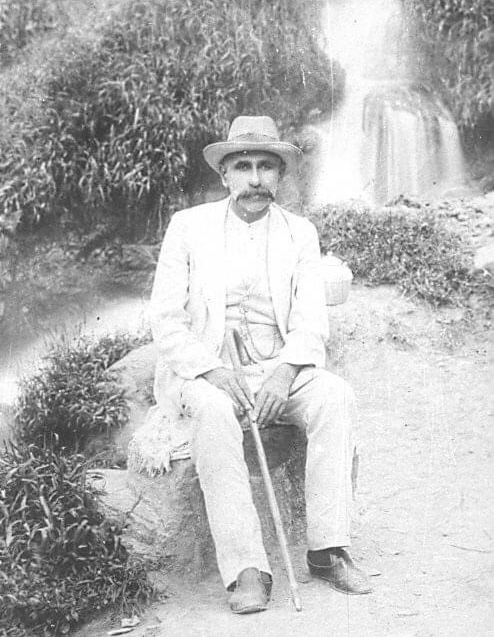
Hashim bey Vezirov

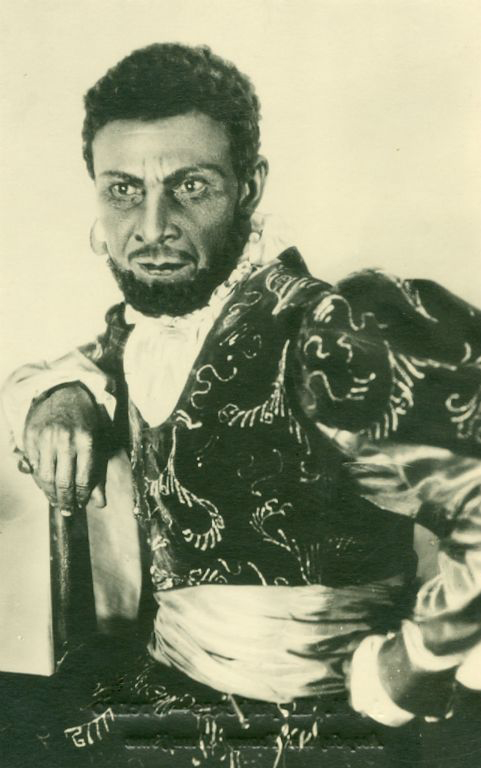
Abbas Mirza Sharifzadeh acting as Othello

By the end of the 19th century, spectacles in Azerbaijani language were staged in province cities such as Nukha, Ganja, Shamakhi, Nakhchivan and others. Followers of Akhundov's drama school, Najaf bey Vazirov, Hashim bey Vazirov, Nariman Narimanov, Abdurrahim bey Hagverdiyev, Jalil Mammadguluzadeh and Suleyman Sani Akhundov, were organizers of theatrical spectacles.

In 1888, a theatrical troupe was created in Baku by active participation of S.M.Ganizade and N.Narimanov. In 1897, the first professional collective, "Muslim Drama Troupe", was established. Repertoire of pre-revolutionary theatre consisted of works of Azerbaijani playwrights (M.F.Akhundov, N.Vazirov, H.Vazirov, N.Narimanov, A.Hagverdiyev, J.Mammadguluzade and others), and also Russian (N.V.Gogol, I.S.Turgenev and L.N.Tolstoy) and western European classics (Shakespeare, Schiller and Molière). Azerbaijani theatre became the center of spreading of enlightenment and democracy ideas from its first years. Morals of feudal society, oppression and despotism of landlord-capitalistic system, obscurantism and religious fanaticism were unmasked in The Tragedy of Fakhraddin, From the Rain to Shower plays by N.Vazirov, Broken Nestle, Miserable Young Boy, Agha Muhammad shah Qajar and Peri the Witch plays by A.Hagverdiyev, Ignorance and Nadir Shah plays by N.Narimanov.

In 1908, a united drama troupe, uniting professional actors such as Huseyn Arablinski, Sidgi Ruhulla and Abulfat Veli, was created under Nijat charity union. The troupe had a cloakroom and props. Besides that, the troupe displayed spectacles in Tagiyev's Theatre and in other regions. Such spectacles as Agha Muhammad shah Qajar by A.Hagverdiyev (1907), Blacksmith Gave by S.Sami (1908), Robbers (1907); Deadmen (1916) by J.Mammadguluzade, Othello (1910) by Shakespeare, on which actor and director H.Arablinski had a great success and arts of who was penetrated by revolutionary and romantic inspiration, were significant events in the history of Azerbaijani theatre.

In 1919, Azerbaijan State Theatre was created.

== Development of Azerbaijani theatre in the Soviet period ==
All theatres in Azerbaijan were nationalized after establishment of the Soviet power and their repertoire was strictly controlled by authorities. Government united destroyed troupes, listed their actors to government service. National theatre acquired its further development due to financial support of the government. In 1920, a United State Theatre including Azerbaijani, Russian and Armenian drama and opera theatres was created. In 1922, Azerbaijani drama troupe was transformed into Academic Drama Theatre. In 1920, a Russian satire-agitation theatre, transformed into Baku Labor Theatre in 1923, was created. Miniatures, revues, parodies to actual socio-political and everyday life themes were staged in the theatre. Along with these, stage versions of classic literature (The Overcoat by N.V.Gogol, The little house in Kolomna, The Tale of the Priest and of His Workman Balda by A.S.Pushkin, The Grand Inquisitor by F.M.Dostoyevski, The Mask, Pharmacist by Chekhov and others) were included into its repertoire. In 1921, Azerbaijani satire-agitation theatre was created, on the basis of which Azerbaijani worker-peasant theatre of Baku transferred into Turkish Labor Theatre of Baku in 1927, was established in 1925.

In 1928-1930, Maxim Gorky Azerbaijan State Theatre of Young Spectators and in 1938, Azerbaijan State Theatre of Musical Comedy was established.

In 1922, M.F.Akhundov Azerbaijan State Theatre of Young Spectators of Tbilisi was created on the basis of Azerbaijani Theatre of Tbilisi and it existed until 1947. In 1928, Azerbaijani Theatre was organized in Irevan — it was the first theatre of other nation in Armenia.

== Azerbaijani Musical Theatre ==
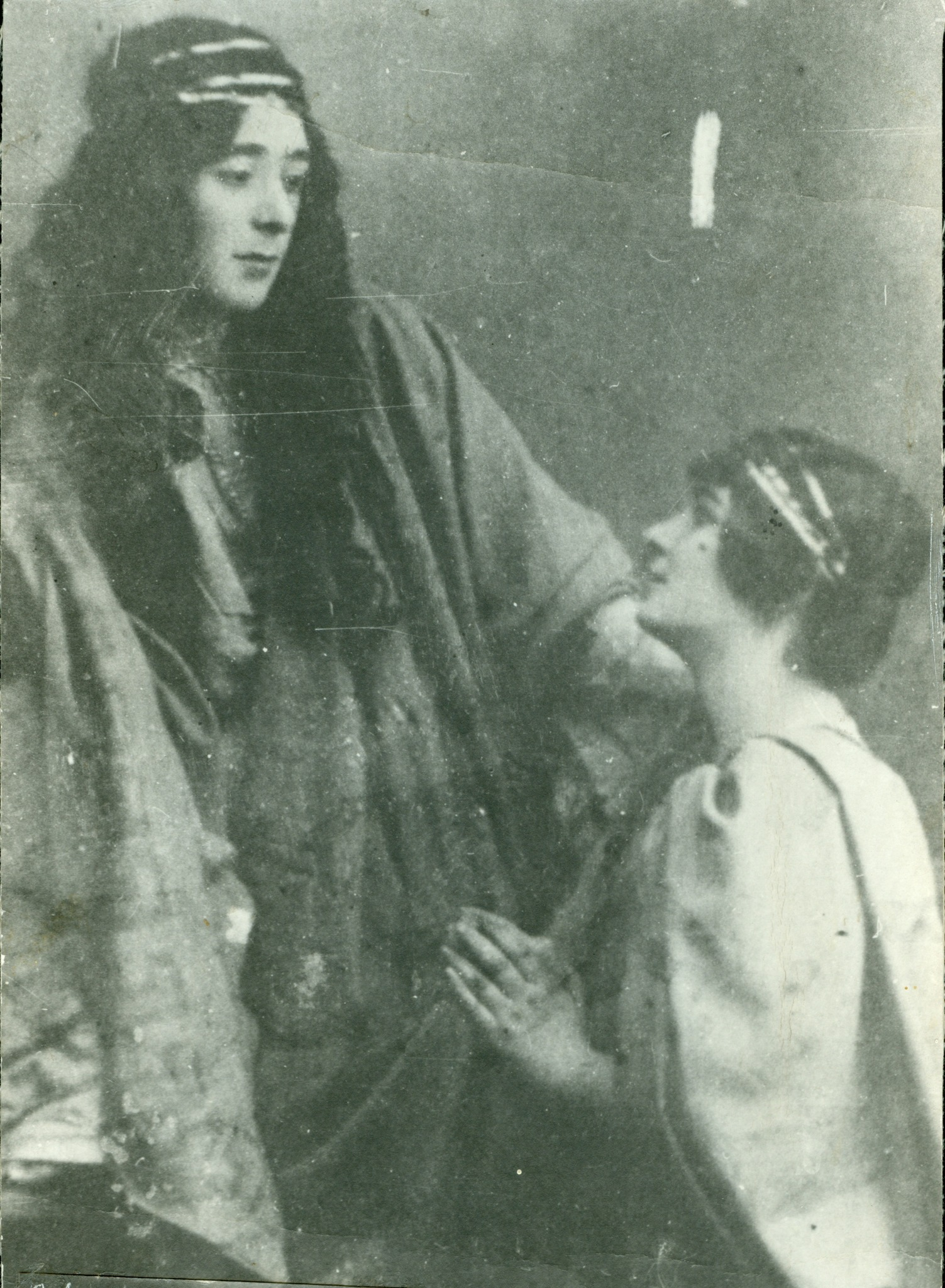
Ahmed Agdamski acting as Leyli. Leyli and Majnun opera

Popularity of theatre among nation and development of national Azerbaijani instruments favored formation of a new form of theatrical art — musical theatre. One-acted scenic images to poems such as Leyli and Majnun by Fuzuli and Farhad and Shirin by Navai were displayed in 1897-1898, in Shusha and in 1901-1902, in Baku. On January 12, 1908 the first national Leyli and Majnun opera by Uzeyir Hajibeyov was staged in Baku. History of professional musical theatre of Azerbaijan was originated since that time. Initially, repertoire of Azerbaijani Musical Theatre consisted of works by U.Hajibeyov, who created Leyli and Majnun, Shaikh Sanan, Rostam and Sohrab, Shah Abbas and Khurshid Banu operas, and also such musical comedies as Husband and Wife, If Not That One, Then This One and Arshin mal alan musical comedies in 1908-1913. Soon, the repertoire of the musical theatre was enriched with new works by Zulfugar Hajibeyov (Ashiq Garib opera and Fifty Years Old Young and Married Bachelor musical comedies), Shah Ismayil opera by Muslim Magomayev, Molla Jabi and Vurhavur musical comedies by M.M.Kazimski, Seyfalmulk opera by Mashadi Jamil Amirov and others.
