= Adventures of the Lankaran Khanate Vizier =

Azerbaijani comedy

Adventures of the Lankaran Khanate Vizier Azerbaijani: Sərgüzəşti-vəziri-xani-Lənkəran
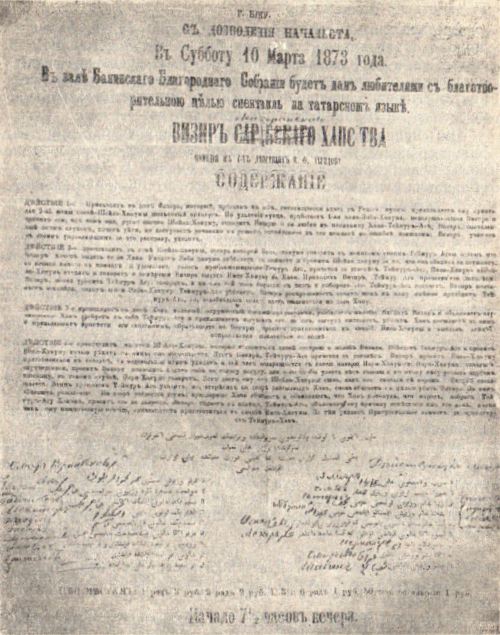
- Play's poster performed on 10 March 1873
- Written by: Mirza Fatali Akhundov
- Genre: Comedy

Premiere
- Date: 1853

Adventures of the Lankaran Khanate Vizier is the third comedy of the Azerbaijani writer and playwright Mirza Fatali Akhundov, written in 1851. This is the first dramatic work played on the stage of the Azerbaijani theatre.

The comedy satirizes the corrupt and tyrannical rulers of the khanates of the times on the eve of the Russian occupation. Actions take place in 1800–1801. The vizier of the Lankaran Khan, Mirza Habib, is presented as a tyrant outside the walls of his house, with the exception of the ruler, before whom he humiliates himself. However, by his own women he is humiliated and deceived. Also, in the comedy, against the background of the palace and family intrigues, the selfless love of the vizier's sister-in-law Nisa-khanum and the nephew of the khan Teimur-aga is shown.

== History of the writing, translations and editions ==
The comedy was written in 1267 Hijri, which corresponds to either 1850 or 1851. Nevertheless, the 1853 publications show that it was written precisely in 1851. The original title of the comedy was "The Adventures of the Vizier of the Sarab Khanate". Under this title, in 1853, the comedy was published in the newspaper Kavkaz. In the same year, in the translation of the author himself, the comedy was published in Russian in Tiflis in the collection called “The Comedies of Mirza Fat-Ali Akhundov”.

In 1874, in the collection of Akhundov's works in Persian, the comedy was published under the title "The novel of the Lankaran Khanate Vizier." Referring to this, a number of Western European orientalists believed that the title of the work was changed by the translator of Akhundov's comedies into Persian, Mirza Mohammed Jafar Garajadagi. This view was also held for a long time by the Azerbaijani scholars of Akhundov. Nevertheless, further research proved that Mirza Muhammad Jafar Garajadagi replaced the word "Sarab" with "Lankaran" directly on Akhundov's advice. The reason for this change was that the action in the play takes place and ends in a seaside town, while Sarab is located far from the sea. The author soon realized this discrepancy, and considered it important to change the scene. Information about this is found in Akhundov's letter to the publicist Mirza Yusif Khan dated with 17 December 1873:

Tell the dear translator to replace the Novel of the Sarab Khan with the Novel of the Lenkoran Khan everywhere ... Sarab is mistaken, it is necessary to write Lankaran - since there is no sea near Sarab.

Mirza Yusif Khan informed the translator about Akhundov's desire, and he changed the name of the comedy. After that, the comedy started to be published under the title "The Adventures of the Lankaran Khanate Vizier".

An English translation appeared in London in 1882 by Guy Le Strange and W.H.D. Haggard. In 1928, the comedy was released as a separate book in Azerbaijani.

== Productions ==
Between 1852 and 1853, the comedy was successfully staged on the Russian stage in Tiflis.

On 10 (22) March 1873, this comedy was chosen to be the first Azerbaijani amateur performance staged in Baku. It was staged under the direction of Hasan-bey Zardabi and with the active participation of Najaf bey Vezirov. This was the beginning of the Azerbaijani theatre's history. Akhundov learned about this event from the newspaper "Kavkaz" and in his letter to Hasan bey Zardabi wrote:

I grew old and expected my death in the near future, but this news extended my life by ten years.

In 1897, when the comedy was preparing for staging in the house of Jahangir Zeynalov, there were not enough amateur actors to perform the episodic roles in the play. Then S. M. Ganizade and Habib bey Makhmudbeyov attracted their students - Huseyn Khalafov (Arablinsky) and Mir Makhmud Kazimovsky, who later became major figures of the Azerbaijani stage.

In 2009, the director Mardan Feyzullaev staged this play at the Moscow Firebird Theatre.

On 26 December 2012, on Akhundov's 200th anniversary, the comedy was staged at the Russian Drama Theatre named after A. S. Griboyedov in Tbilisi.
