= Honored Artist of the Azerbaijan SSR =

Honored Artist of the Azerbaijan SSR Азәрбајҹан ССР әмәкдар артисти
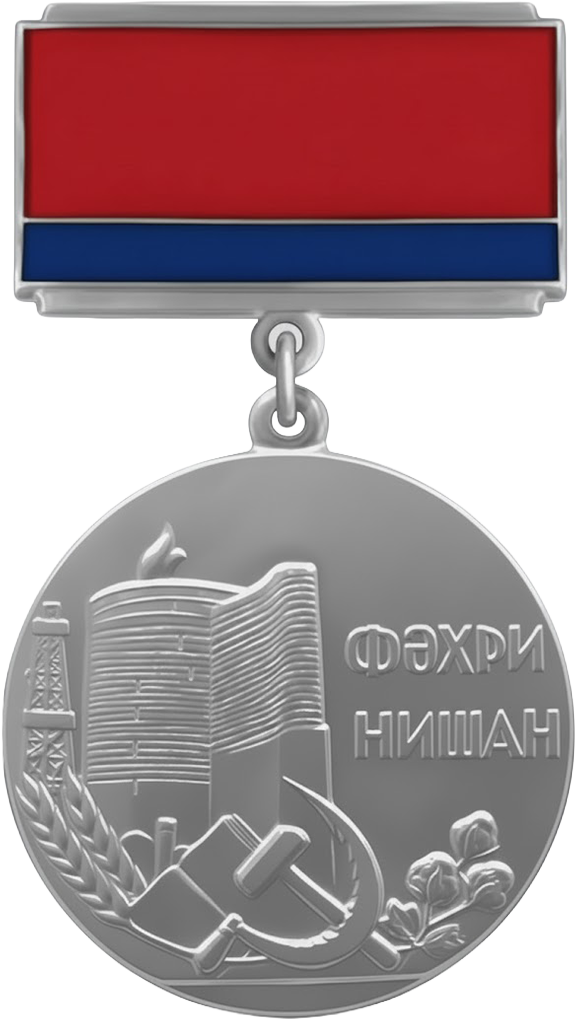
- Type: Honorary title
- Country: Azerbaijan SSR
- First award: January 13, 1929
- Final award: June 2, 1990

Highlights
- Total recipients: More than 600

Precedence
- Next (higher): People's Artist of the Azerbaijan SSR

Honored Artist of the Azerbaijan SSR (Azerbaijani: Azərbaycan SSR əməkdar artisti; Russian: Заслуженный артист Азербайджанской ССР) was an honorary title awarded by the Presidium of the Supreme Soviet of the Azerbaijan Soviet Socialist Republic (Azerbaijan SSR) and was one of the forms of recognition by the state and society of the merits of distinguished citizens. The awards were issued from January 13, 1929 to June 2, 1990; and there were more than 600 recipients.

== List of honored artists ==
- 1929, Gurban Pirimov
- 1929, Abbas Mirza Sharifzadeh
- 1931, Sidgi Ruhulla
- 1939, Yaver Kelenterli
- 1940, Ahmad Anatolly
- 1956, Fatma Mehraliyeva
- 1958, Gambar Zulalov
- 1959, Khumar Zulfugarova
- 1960, Nasiba Zeynalova
- 1960, Sattar Bahlulzade
- 1961, Maria Titarenko
- 1969, Osman Hajibeyov
- 1974, Samandar Rzayev
- 1975, Talat Bakikhanov
