= Bayramly =

Bayramly or Bayramlı may refer to:

- Bayramlı, Barda, Azerbaijan
- Bayramly, Gadabay, Azerbaijan
- Bayramly, Imishli, Azerbaijan
- Bayramlı, Shamkir, Azerbaijan
- Bayramlı, Tovuz, Azerbaijan
- Bayramly, Yevlakh, Azerbaijan
