= Ilgar Hasanov =

Ilgar Hasanov Ильга́р Гаса́нов
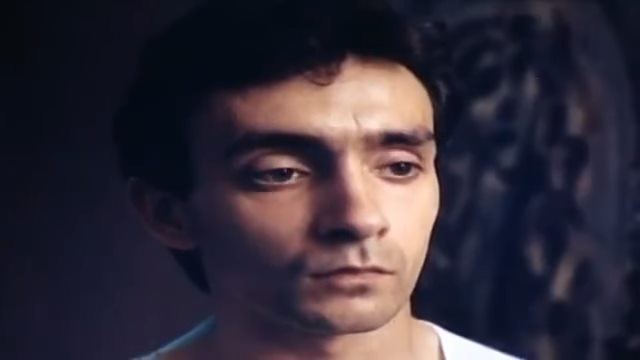
- Ilgar Hasanov
- Born: Baku, Azerbaijan Soviet Socialist Republic, Soviet Union, USSR
- Other names: Ilgar Gasanov
- Education: Azerbaijan State Oil and Industry University; Gerasimov Institute of Cinematography (BA)
- Occupations: Artist; Musician; Composer; Actor

Ilgar Hasanov (Russian: Ильга́р Исрафи́лович Гаса́нов) is an Azerbaijani artist, musician, composer, and actor. He graduated from the Gerasimov Institute of Cinematography (VGIK) in Moscow, Russia, and has played in productions at the Azerbaijani State Theater of the Young Spectators, the Russian Drama Theater, and the Academic Opera and Ballet Theater.

In 1989, Hasanov played the leading role in Jahangir Zeynally's film, Elaqe, the first psychological sci-fi film in Azerbaijan. His filmography includes Contact (1989), Circle (1989), Opposition, Through the Eyes of a Ghost (2010), Karabakhname, Babu (2013), and Victims of Love (Məhəbbət Qurbanları, 2017). He has also appeared in television series in Turkey, Azerbaijan, and other countries. Hasanov has collaborated with Finnish composer Lasse Heikkilä and composed music for the Greater Grace Church.

Hasanov studied at the VGIK in the class of Aleksey Batalov. After graduating, he returned to Baku, where he performed at the Azerbaijani State Theater of the Young Spectators, then Russian Drama Theater. In 1988, at the suggestion of film director Jahangir Zeynally, he played the leading role in the film Contact, based on Anar Rzayev's novel of the same name. In 2010, he played the role of Alyosha in The Brothers Karamazov at the Russian Drama Theater in Baku.
