= Murad Yagizarov =

Soviet and Azerbaijani actor (1939–2025)

- Born: 18 July 1939; Baku, Azerbaijan SSR, USSR
- Died: 13 September 2025 (aged 86); Munich, Germany
- Occupation: Actor
- Years active: 1958–2025
- Awards: Honored Artist of the Azerbaijan SSR

Murad Yagizarov (Azerbaijani: Hacı Murad Yagizarov, 18 July 1939 – 13 September 2025) was a Soviet and Azerbaijani actor. He was honored as the People's Artiste of the Azerbaijan SSR in 1982.

== Life and career ==
Hacı Murad Hacı Ahmed oğlu Yagizarov was born on 18 July 1939, in Baku, Azerbaijan SSR, USSR. While studying at school, he performed in the drama club. The famous actor Alasgar Alakbarov, who watched the speech, advised him to enter the Theater Institute. He studied at the acting faculty of the Azerbaijan State Academy of Fine Arts in the course of Maharram Hashimov (1958–1962). Since 1962, he was working at the Azerbaijan State Academic Russian Drama Theatre named after Samad Vurgun.

Yagizarov was a member of the Communist Party of the Soviet Union from 1973 to 1991.

=== Personal life and death ===
His great-grandfather was descended from the Shamakhi Khans. One side of it is from Kumyks of Buynaksk. After the October Revolution, his father was exiled from the city of Buynaksk to Siberia, but after many years he was able to return to Baku. People from the same roots as him live in Makhachkala, Kislovodsk, Baku and other cities of the Caucasus.

Yagizarov died in Germany on 13 September 2025, at the age of 86.

== Filmography ==
- On Distant Shores (1958) as partisan
- The Stepmother (1958) as Ayaz
- Matteo Falcone (1960) as soldier (uncredited)
- Babek (1979) as Khalifa Mamun

== Awards and honors ==
- Honored Artist of the Azerbaijan SSR (1974)
- People's Artiste of the Azerbaijan SSR (1982)
- Shohrat Order (2009)
- Sharaf Order (2019)
