= Shusha Musical Drama Theatre =

Azerbaijani theatre

- Azerbaijani: Şuşa Dövlət Musiqili Dram Teatrı
- Interactive map of Shusha Musical Drama Theatre
- Address: Suleyman Sani Akhundov street 48; Baku; Azerbaijan
- Type: Musical comedy

Construction
- Years active: 1874 — present

Shusha Musical Drama Theatre (Azerbaijani: Şuşa Dövlət Musiqili Dram Teatrı) is one of the musical drama theatres operating in Azerbaijan.

== About ==
In February 1938, Shusha State Kolkhoz and Sovkhoz Theatre was established. In 1943, the collective was renamed the Shusha State Musical Drama Theatre named after Uzeyir Hajibeyov. Shusha Musical Drama Theater ceased its activities in early 1949. By the decision of the Cabinet of Ministers of the Republic of Azerbaijan, Ministry of Culture restored the activity of Shusha State Musical Drama Theater. In 1992, the theater moved to Baku due to the war in Karabakh and settled in the building of Theatre of Young Spectators (1992–2005). Then the theatre operated in the building of "Savalan" cinema in Baku (from 2005 to 2014).

In 2013, "Savalan" cinema was liquidated and the building was transferred to Shusha State Musical Drama Theatre. In 2014, the building underwent major restoration and repair work. In accordance with the order of the President of the Republic of Azerbaijan, "Savalan" cinema was repaired and in December 2018 was transferred to Shusha State Musical Drama Theatre.

Yusif bey Malikhagnazarov, Abdurrahim bey Hagverdiyev, Zulfugar Hajibeyov, Suleyman Sani Akhundov, Uzeyir Hajibeyov, Firidun bey Kocharli, Badal bey Badalbeyli, Safarali bey Valibeyov, Jabbar Garyaghdioglu, Hashim bey Vazirov are well known playwrights, composers, actors and theatre organizers of the theatre.

Shusha Musical Drama Theatre was a participant of the republican theatre festivals as "Mono performances" in 1994, "Experimental performances" in 1998, "National classics and theatre" in 1999, "Festival of festivals" in 2000, and was awarded "Golden Darvish" prize for the play "Ayri oturag, duz danishag" by Uzeyir Hajibeyov in 2002.

== Main repertoire ==
"Haji Gara", "Lankaran khaninin vaziri", "Khirs guldurbasan" (Mirza Fatali Akhundov), "Bakhtsiz javan", "Daghilan tifag" (Abdurrahim bey Hagverdiyev), "Solghun chichaklar", "Sevil", "Almaz", "Yashar", "Ogtay Eloghlu", "in 1905" (Jafar Jabbarly), "Vagif", "Farhad and Shirin" (Samad Vurgun), etc.

Musical performances — "Leyli and Majnun", "Asli and Kerem", "If Not That One, Then This One" (Uzeyir Hajibeyov), "Ashig Garib" (Zulfugar Hajibeyov) and others.

== Staff ==
- Director — Yadigar Muradov
- Chief director — Loghman Karimov
- Artist — Valeh Mammadov
