= Hamlet Gurbanov =

Soviet-Azerbaijani actor

- Azerbaijani: Hamlet Qurbanov
- Born: October 13, 1938; Baku, Azerbaijani SSR, Soviet Union
- Died: 1996 (aged 80–81); Baku, Azerbaijan
- Education: Azerbaijan State Institute of Arts
- Awards: Honored Artist of the Azerbaijani SSR; 1982

Hamlet Aghadadash oghlu Gurbanov (Azerbaijani: Hamlet Ağadadaş oğlu Qurbanov; 1938 – 1995) was a Soviet-Azerbaijani theater and film actor. He had received the honorary title of the Honored Artist of the Azerbaijani SSR in 1982.

== Early life ==
Hamlet Aghadadash oglu Gurbanov was born on 13 October 1938, in Baku, capital of the Azerbaijani SSR, which was then part of the Soviet Union. His father, Aghadadash Gurbanov, was an actor, and his mother, Gulkhar Hasanova, was an opera singer. Gurbanov was named after the protagonist of Shakespeare's Hamlet. Later, he entered the acting department of the Azerbaijan State Institute of Arts, from which he graduated in 1961.

== Career ==
Hamlet Gurbanov played various roles on the stage of the Azerbaijan Drama Theater from 1961 to 1992. One of his first roles in the theater was the role of Asker in Samad Vurgun's Vagif.

In big screen, he played roles such as Abdulali Bey in Sevil, Kipchak Malik in Dada Gorgud, Chairman in Our grandfather's grandfather's grandfather, Demirov in Jinn in The Microdistrict, Mirbagir Agha in Hello from the Other World, Sadikhov in the Atayevs, Ildrym Bayazid in the Topal Teymur and others.

== Death ==
Gurbanov was diagnosed with cancer and died on 16 November 1995, in Baku, the capital of Azerbaijan.
