= Najiba Malikova =

- Nəcibə Məlikova; Меликова, Наджиба
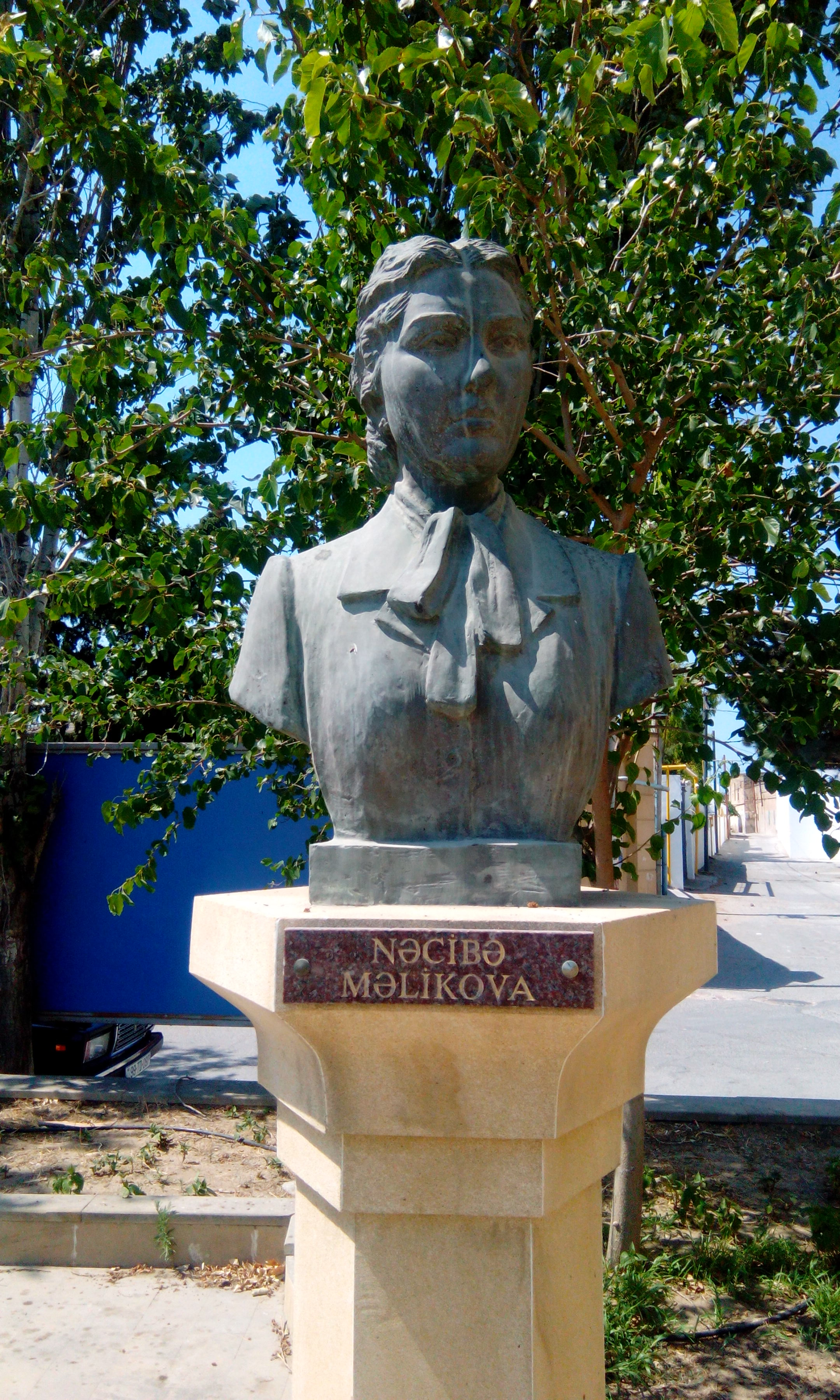
- Born: Najiba Gashim qizi Melikova; October 25, 1921; Buzovna settlement, Baku, Azerbaijan Democratic Republic
- Died: July 27, 1992 (aged 70); Baku, Azerbaijan
- Burial place: Alley of Honor, Baku
- Occupation: Actress
- Awards: Honored Artist of the Azerbaijan SSR (1959); People's Artiste of the Azerbaijan SSR (1974)

Najiba Gashim qizi Melikova (Azerbaijani: Nəcibə Məlikova, Russian: Меликова, Наджиба; 1921–1992) also Näcibä Mälikova, was an Azerbaijani and Soviet actress of theater and film. She was awarded the title of People's Artiste of the Azerbaijan SSR (June 1, 1974).

== Biography ==
Melikova was born on October 25, 1921, in the Buzovna settlement of Baku, Azerbaijan Democratic Republic. She received her primary education in a village. From 1940 to 1943, she studied at the Baku Theater School, where she was in the same class as Fatma Kadri. After graduating from school, she started work at Ganja State Drama Theater. Soon after returning to Baku, she entered the Theater Institute, graduating in 1951.

Melikova started stage acting in 1938. In 1952, she began to appear in episodic roles in the National Drama Theater. Melikova appeared in dramas and comedies.

On June 10, 1959, Melikova received the title of Honored Artist of the Azerbaijan SSR. On June 1, 1974, she was awarded the title, People's Artists of the Azerbaijan SSR.

The actress died on July 27, 1992, in Baku. She was buried in the Alley of Honor cemetery in Baku.

== Theatrical works ==
Melikova played roles in the following theatrical plays:

- Shoyli khanum - "Vizier of the Lankaran Khanate" (M.F Akhundov)
- Humar - "Sheikh Sanan" (G. Javid)
- Khuraman - "Vagif" (S. Vurgun)
- Sadgiya Hatun - "The Sword and the Feather" (M.S Ordubadi)
- Humar - "Sheikh Sanan" (Huseyn Javid)
- Firangiz - "Siyavush" (Abdulragim bey Hagverdiyev)
- Boyukhan - "Aydin" (Jafar Jabbarli)
- Sona - "in 1905" (Jafar Jabbarli)
- Edel - "Sevil" (Jafar Jabbarli)
- Atlas - "Life" (Mirza Ibragimov)
- Firuza - "Winds" (Sabit Rahman)
- Sofia Ivanovna - "Zikov's" (Maxim Gorky)
- Ogudalova - "A Girl Without a Dowry" (Alexander Ostrovsky)
- Malakhat - "Strange guy" (Ilyas Efendiyev)

== Filmography ==
- 1945 -The Cloth Peddler (Azerbaijani: Arshin Mal Alan), Jagan-Hala (directed by Tofig Taghizade)
- 1947 - Fatali Khan - Khadija
- 1950 - Fires of Baku - Mirvarid (duplicated by N. Cherednichenko)
- 1958 - The Stepmother, Dilara
- 1960 - Aygun
- 1961 - Legend and love - Salima (duplicated by M. Blinov)
- 1963 - Where is Ahmed? - Nargiz
- 1968 - In the name of the law - Zarintaj (dubbed Tamara Semina)
- 1981 - Long Life Chords
