= Rahile Ginzburg =

Azerbaijani Soviet actress

Ginzburq Rahilə Solomonovna
- Born: 1 June 1920; Baku, Russian Empire
- Died: 6 December 1995 (aged 75); Baku, Azerbaijan
- Citizenship: Soviet Union; Azerbaijani Republic
- Occupation: Actress

Rahile Solomonovna Ginzburg (Azerbaijani:Ginzburq Rahilə Solomonovna; b. 1 June 1920, Baku, Russian Empire - d. 6 December 1995, Baku, Azerbaijan) was an Azerbaijani Soviet actress of the Azerbaijan State Academic Russian Drama Theatre, People's Artist of the Azerbaijan SSR (1964).

== Life ==
Rakhile Ginzburg was born on June 1, 1920, in Baku, into the family of Solomon Ginzburg, a leader in one of Baku's oil industries. In 1937, she enrolled in the acting faculty of the Baku Theater Technical School (later renamed the Theater Institute in 1945). As a student, 18-year-old Rakhile met the young director Maharram Hashimov of the Youth Theater, a Distinguished Artist of the Azerbaijan SSR. In the same year, 1938, Maherram and Rakhile were engaged.

Rakhile and Maherram had a daughter named Tamilla, who later became an Honored Journalist of Azerbaijan and worked in television. In 1943, Rakhile Ginzburg graduated from the technical school and began performing on the stage of the Russian Drama Theater. In 1949, her husband, Maharram Hashimov, was appointed the director of this theater. However, Rakhile never played a leading role in any of Hashimov's productions.

The peak of Ginzburg's career occurred in the 1960s. In 1964, she was awarded the title of People's Artist of the Azerbaijan SSR.

The actress died on December 6, 1995, in Baku, and she was buried in the Second Alley of Honorary Burial in Baku.

== Roles in the theater ==
- Lidia (Alexander Ostrovsky's "Mad money")
- Gulnar (Samad Vurgun's Enemies)
- Sofia (Alexander Griboyedov's "Woe from Wit")
- Balka (Aleksei Arbuzov's "Irkutsk history")
- Luisia (Friedrich Schiller's "Intrigue and Love")
- Pavel Kohout's "This kind of love"
- William Gibson's "Two on a swing"
- Friedrich Schiller's "Mary Stuart"
- Nina (Mikhail Lermontov's "Masquerade")
- Elisa (George Bernard Shaw's "Pygmalion")
- Tonya (Leonid Malyugin's "Old friends")
- Natasha (Edvard Radzinsky's "104 pages about love")
- Negina (Alexander Ostrovsky's "Talents and Admirers")
- Irina (Anton Chekhov's "Three Sisters")
- Nelli (Fyodor Dostoevsky's "Humiliated and Insulted")
- Shirin (Samad Vurgun's "Farhad and Shirin")
