= Azad Mammadov =

- Azerbaijani: Azad Məmmədov
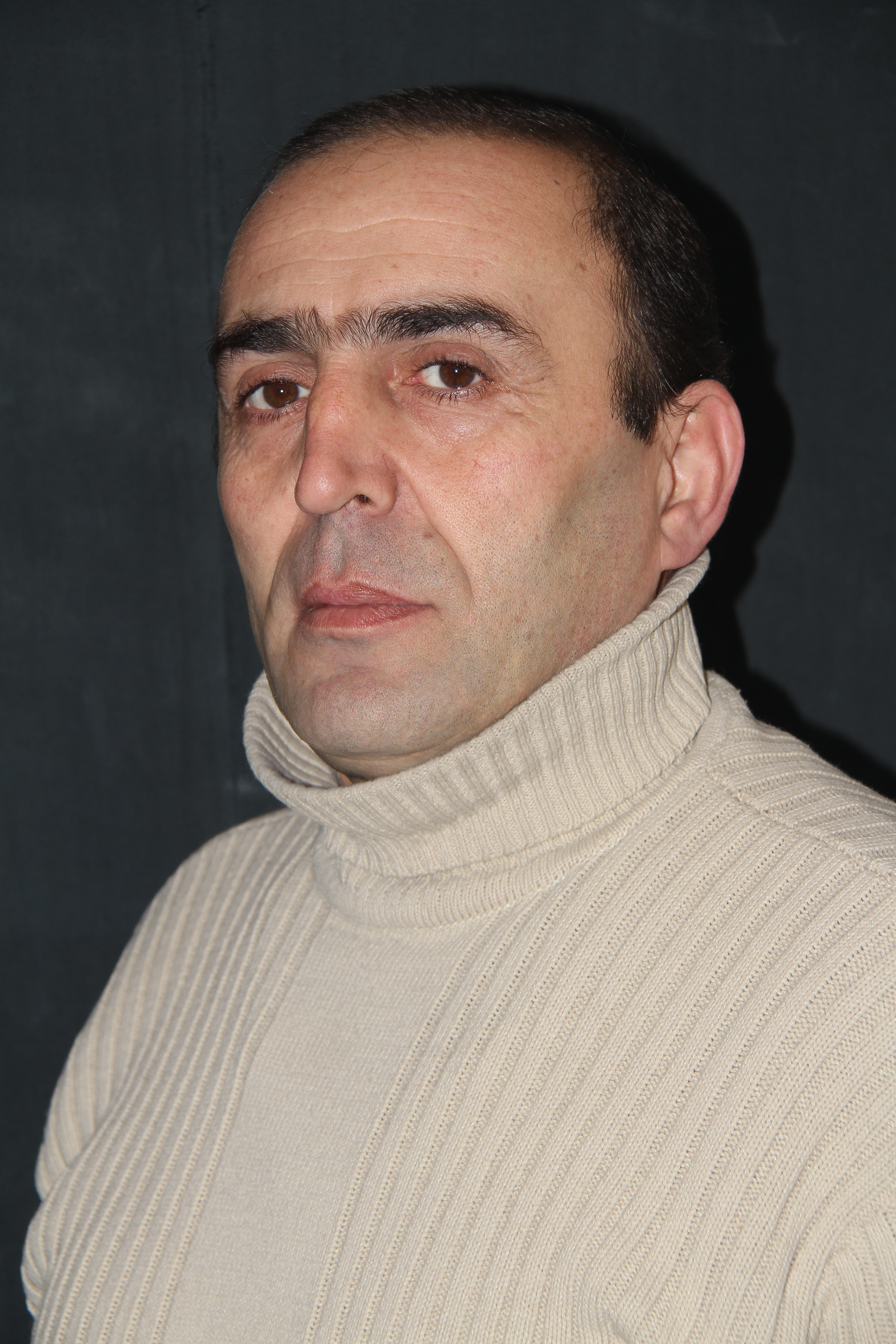
- Born: Məmmədov Azad Əşrəf oğlu December 12, 1964 (age 61); Shusha, Azerbaijan SSR, USSR
- Citizenship: Soviet Union; Azerbaijan
- Education: Azerbaijan State University of Culture and Arts
- Occupation: Actor
- Years active: 1990–present
- Awards: Honored Artist of Azerbaijan Republic

Azad Mammadov (Azerbaijani: Azad Məmmədov, 12 December 1964) is an actor of Shusha Musical Drama Theatre, Honored Artist of Azerbaijan Republic.

== Biography ==
Azad Mammadov was born on December 12, 1964, in Shusha. In 1980–1984 he studied in kamancha class at Shusha Music Technical School named after Mir Mohsun Navvab and later worked here as a teacher. In 1988–1993 he studied at Azerbaijan State University of Culture and Art.

He has been acting as an actor in Shusha State Musical Drama Theatre since 1990, and as Deputy Director since 1994.

Azad Mammadov acted as both an actor and a musician at the concert "Nəğmədir, gülüşdür hər dərdə məlhəm". He has been a music designer for several productions in the theater: Jafar Jabbarly "Aydin", Suleyman Sani Akhundov "Greedy", Abdurrahim bey Hagverdiyev "Daghilan Tifag", Jalil Mammadguluzadeh "Kamancha", Ilyas Afandiyev "You are always with me", Nuraddin Qanbar "Burial of the monkey".

He played the role of a duck (mim) in a pantomime performance of "Üç nöqtə, vergül, nida, sual" (R.Shahsuvarov) at the Him-jim pantomime festival held in 1994, the role of "Hatamkhan Agha" in the performance of "Hekayəti Müsyö Jordan Həkimi-Nəbatat və Dərviş Məstəli Şah Cadükuni Məşhur" (M.F.Akhundov) at "National Classics" Festival in 1999, the role of male ("Musical Letters", F.Mustafa) and "Nikita Ivanich" ("Swansong", A.P.Chekhov) at the Theater Festival "The Completeness of Empty Space" in 2005.

== Awards ==
- The Golden Dervish Award of the Azerbaijan Union of Theater Figures (Together with the creative staff of the play "Əyri oturaq, düz danışaq") — 2002
- Presidential Award – 2005
- Honored Artist of Azerbaijan Republic – 25 June 2013

== Main roles ==
Play	Author	Role
Arshın mal alan	Uzeyir Hajibeyov	Vali
Özümüz bilərik	Suleyman Alasgarov və Shikhali Gurbanov	Mirish
Durna	Said Rustamov və Suleyman Rustam	Hilal
Ayının min bir oyunu	Sultan Majid Ganizade	Rustam bey and Aghajafar Galibani
Marqaritka	Armand Salacrou	Old man
Gözəlləri necə qaçırırlar	Bilal Appayev	Hopay
Xəlifə Leylək	Wilhelm Hauff	Taleteller and wise Salim
Aydın	Jafar Jabbarly	Surkhay and Mirza Javad
Ağıllı adam	Firuz Mustafa	Journalist
Sehirli kreslo	Frigyes Karinthy	Genius
Bayramın birinci günü	Nâzım Hikmet	Rustam
Millət dostları	Abdurrahim bey Hagverdiyev	Safar bey
Dağılan tifaq	Abdurrahim bey Hagverdiyev	Dallak Hagverdi
Kamança	Jalil Mammadguluzadeh	Bakhshi kamancha-player
Sərgüzəşti-vəziri-xani-Lənkəran	Mirza Fatali Akhundov	Haji Salah
Nənəmin şahlıq quşu	Aliagha Kurchayli və Vasif Adigozalov	Gulu
Sən həmişə mənimləsən	Ilyas Afandiyev	Faraj
Şuşa dağlarını duman bürüyüb	Elchin Afandiyev	Doppa Dadash
