= Alim Mammadov =

Azerbaijani actor

Alim Mammadov Alim Məmmədov
- Born: September 25, 1950 (age 75); Ganja, Azerbaijan SSR, USSR
- Occupation: Actor
- Years active: 1967–present

Alim Tahir oghlu Mammadov (Azerbaijani: Alim Tahir oğlu Məmmədov, born September 25, 1950) is an Azerbaijani actor, People's Artiste of Azerbaijan (1992).

== Biography ==
Alim Mammadov was born on September 25, 1950, in Ganja. In 1967, he started working as a supporting actor in the Ganja State Drama Theater. In 1982–1987, he studied at the cultural-educational faculty of the Azerbaijan State Institute of Arts. Since 1977, he has been continuously working as an actor in the Ganja State Drama Theater. The actor has appeared in "Bir janub shaharinda", "Gara Volqa", "Gazalkhan", "Ulukhanli maktabi" and other feature-documentary films produced by "Azerbaijanfilm" film studio.

== Awards ==
- People's Artiste of Azerbaijan — March 4, 1992
- Honored Artist of the Azerbaijan SSR — December 24, 1981
