= Maharram =

Maharram is a given name. Notable people with the name include:

- Maharram Aliyev (born 1951), Deputy Minister of Justice of the Republic of Azerbaijan
- Maharram Bayramov (1928— 1981), Azerbaijani politician
- Maharram Dadashev (1912–1944), Azerbaijani military officer
- Maharram Hashimov (1912–1969), Azerbaijani theatre director
- Maharram Mammadyarov (1924–2022), Azerbaijani scientist
- Maharram Seyidov (1952–1990), National Hero of Azerbaijan
