= Səməd Vurğun, Azerbaijan =

Village and municipality in Shamkir Rayon, Azerbaijan

Coordinates: 40°55′N 46°11′E

Səməd Vurğun is a village and municipality in the Shamkir Rayon of Azerbaijan. It has a population of 1,433. The village was named after Soviet writer Samad Vurgun.
