= Gulkhar Hasanova =

Azerbaijani opera singer (1918–2005)

Gulkhar Hasanova Gülxar Həsənova
- Born: 10 December 1918; Bayramli, Elizavetpol Governorate, Azerbaijan Democratic Republic
- Died: 30 March 2005 (aged 86); Baku, Azerbaijan
- Occupations: Singer, actress
- Spouse: Agadadash Gurbanov
- Children: Hamlet Gurbanov
- Awards

Gulkhar Ibrahim gizi Hasanova (Azerbaijani: Gülxar Həsənova; 10 December 1918 – 30 March 2005) was an Azerbaijani mugham opera singer.

Gulkhar Hasanova (née Sultanova) was born in Bayramli. Originally she wanted to pursue a career in medicine and entered the Baku Medical College. While in college, she became an active member of the amateur drama club and revealed a passion for acting and singing. In 1936, she began acting at the Azerbaijan State Theatre of Young Spectators, while receiving education in acting at the Baku Theatre School. Her musical gift was discovered during one of the performances attended by composer Uzeyir Hajibeyov, who offered Hasanova a job as a soloist at the Azerbaijan State Academic Opera and Ballet Theatre. She continued working at that theatre for the rest of her career. Hasanova performed mainly in mugham operas, a synthetic genre uniting European belcanto with Azeri folk music. She received the most positive reviews for her roles as Leyli in Leyli and Majnun and Arabzangi in Shah Ismayil.

Hasanova also greatly contributed to the training of young opera singers as a music instructor. Throughout her life, she occasionally appeared in minor and mostly uncredited roles in a number of feature films.

In 1982 she was awarded the title of the People's Artist of Azerbaijan.
