= Vagif (play) =

Play by Samad Vurgun

Vagif Azerbaijani: Vaqif
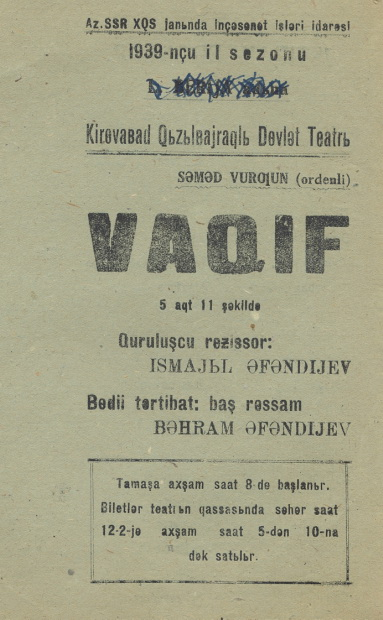
- Playbill of the play on the stage of the Kirovabad Drama Theatre after the name of L. Beria (1939)
- Original language: Azerbaijani
- Written by: Samad Vurgun
- Genre: Tragedy

Premiere
- Date: 1938
- Place: Azerbaijan State Academic Drama Theatre

"Vagif" (Azerbaijani: Vaqif) is a play by the Azerbaijani poet Samad Vurgun, written in 1937 in 3 acts and II scenes. It was dedicated to the fate of the 18th century Azerbaijani poet and statesman Molla Panah Vagif.

== Translations and editions ==
In 1939, the play was translated into Russian by the young playwright Leonid Zorin, in 1940 by Vladimir Gurvich, and in 1941 by Adelina Adalis. After the work was published in Moscow, the famous writers and theatre experts Alexander Fadeyev, R. Wart, O. Litovsky, Ilya Selvinsky, Adelina Adalis, Rachel Miller-Budnitskaya and others wrote articles where they analysed the play "Vagif".

The first edition of the play, translated from Azerbaijani by Gurvich, was published in Moscow and Leningrad in 1941. In 1959, "Vagif. A dramatic chronicle of the 18th century in 3 acts, 11 scenes" was published in Moscow, being translated from Azerbaijani by Adelina Adalis.

== Performances ==
On 5 September 1938, "Vagif" was staged at the Azerbaijan State Drama Theatre in Baku by the director Adil Isgandarov. The artist was Nusrat Fatullayev, the composer was Said Rustamov. The role of Vagif was played by Alasgar Alakbarov and Kazim Ziya, the role of Khuraman - Fatma Gadri and Gulnar Hajiyeva, the role of Eldar - Rza Afganli and Movsum Sanani, the role of Vidadi - Aghadadash Gurbanov, the role of Shah Qajar - Sidgi Ruhulla, and the role of the jester - Sadikhov. This play, staged by Iskenderov, according to the theatre expert Jafar Jafarov, was very popular and lasted for a long time. Jafarov wrote:

The performance caused the warmest and most enthusiastic responses in the republican and central press.

On 24 January 1940, the play "Vagif" was staged in the Baku Russian Drama Theatre by the director Ismail Hidayatzada. The artist was Gusak, the composer was Nina Karnitskaya; The role of Vagif was performed by Shulgin, Eldar by Baykov, Khuraman by Babichev, Vidadi by Zharikov. In 1948, the play was performed on the stage of the Kirovakan Theatre of the Armenian SSR, and in 1952 on the stage of the Armenian Drama Theatre in Tbilisi.

In 1941, the work was awarded the Stalin Prize.

On 8 February 1953, the 500th performance of the play took place at the Azerbaijan State Drama Theatre (Aghadadash Gurbanov played Vidadi, Sidgi Rukhulla - Qajar, Alasgar Alakbarov - Vagif, Rza Afganli and Movsum Sanani - Eldar).

== Reviews ==
The Russian poet and playwright Ilya Selvinsky wrote about the play:

The tragedy "Vagif" contains everything that should be in a tragedy: time, characters, extras, passions, love, hatred, struggle, death. Reading "Vagif", you remember Shakespeare and Pushkin, more precisely - "Hamlet" and "Boris Godunov". But there is a feature in the play that is so characteristic only to Samad Vurgun: it is his broad lyricism. The image of Vagif, like other images of the tragedy, is written in a realistic manner. Not only manners and customs, but even things under the pen of the poet convince us of their authenticity.

== See also ==
- Khayyam
- The Devil
- Sheikh Sanan

== Literature ==
- Valikhanova, Farida (1986). Самед Вургун среди друзей-переводчиков. Язычы. - Premiered in Baku
- Habib Babayev (1981). Самед Вургун: Очерк творчества. Советский писатель. p. 271. - Premiered in Moscow
- Jahid Guliyev (1986). Навсегда в сыновья тебе дан: страницы жизни и творчества Самеда Вургуна. Azernashr. p. 203. - Premiered in Baku
