= Aliagha Aghayev =

Azerbaijani actor

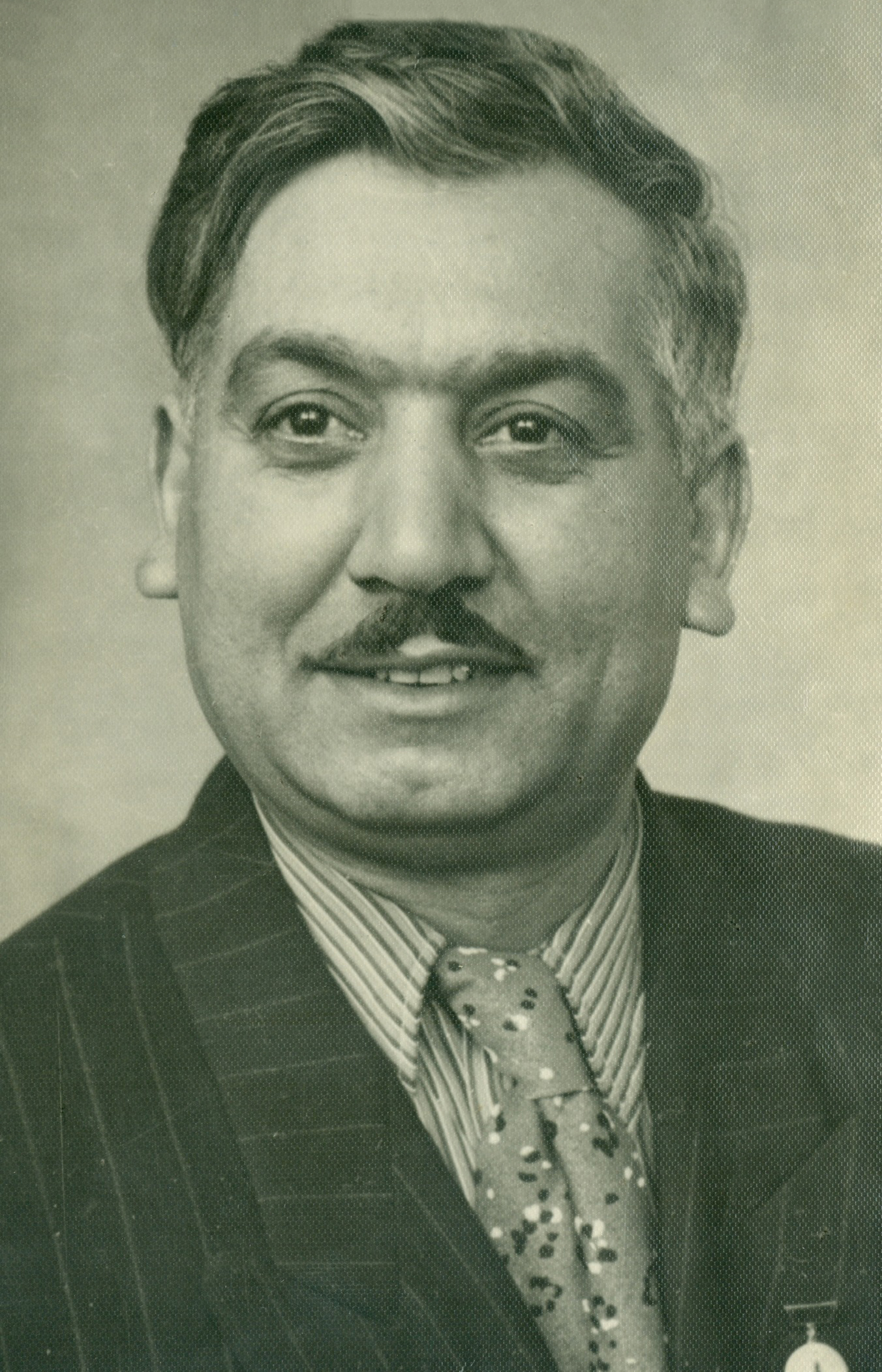
- Born: March 22, 1913; Baku, Baku uezd, Baku Governorate, Caucasus Viceroyalty, Russian Empire (now Azerbaijan)
- Died: November 13, 1983 (aged 70); Baku, Azerbaijani SSR, Soviet Union
- Citizenship: Russian Empire; Azerbaijan Democratic Republic; Soviet Union
- Occupation: Actor
- Years active: 1936–1983
- Spouse: Javahir Isgandarova
- Awards: Honored Art Worker of the Azerbaijan SSR People's Artiste of the Azerbaijan SSR Order of the Red Banner of Labour

Aliagha Ismayil oghlu Aghayev (Azerbaijani: Əliağa İsmayıl oğlu Ağayev; March 22, 1913 – November 13, 1983) was a Soviet and Azerbaijani actor. He was awarded the People's Artiste of the Azerbaijan SSR. He was famous for his comedy roles.

== About ==
Aliagha Aghayev was born on March 22, 1913, in Baku, Russian Empire. After graduating from the 7th class in 1930, he studied at a vocational school at the ship's repair plant named after the Paris Commune. 2 years later, after he completed school, he started to work in the factory. Aliagha Aliyev joined the factory's drama community. His first role was "Haji Gara" in the "Haji Gara" comedy by Mirza Fatali Akhundov.

The actor joined the State Theatre of Young Spectators collective in the late 1930s. He made his first appearance on the stage at professional theater with the Jules Verne drama "The Children of Captain Grant". The actor was admitted to the National Academic Drama Theatre in the fall of 1961. His first original role in this theatre was "Abish Surkhayevich" in Shikhali Gurbanov's comedy "We Got a Job" in 1961. A.Aghayev worked at National Academic Drama Theatre for 22 years.

A.Aghayev's some roles in Academic Theatre — "Vasin" ("Tanya" — Aleksei Arbuzov), "Allanazar" ("Who is Guilty?" — Huseyn Mukhtarov), "Gulamali", "Abishov", "Naghi"("Kozaran Ojaglar", "Village Girl", "Good Man" — Mirza Ibrahimov), "Stephano" ("The Tempest" — William Shakespeare), "Rista Podorovich" ("The Cabinet Minister's Wife" — Branislav Nušić) and others.

He was mostly known for his "Mashadi Ibad" role in "If Not That One, Then This One" movie. His other movie roles are also so famous as "Khan" ("A Magical Coat"), "Shikhali" (Dating"), cashier ("Where is Ahmed?"), storekeeper ("For the Sake of the Law"/"Mehman") and others.

Aghayev died on November 13, 1983, in Baku, Azerbaijan SSR, USSR.

== Awards ==
1. Honored Art Worker of the Azerbaijan SSR — June 17, 1943
2. Order of the Red Banner of Labour — June 9, 1959
3. People's Artiste of the Azerbaijan SSR — February 27, 1954

== Filmography ==
- Case No.777 (1992)
- The Cloth Peddler (1965)
- Bashir Safaroghlu (1969)
- Our Jabish Teacher (1969)
- Crazy Kura (1969)
- The Darvish Detonates Paris (1976)
- A Transverse House of Darling (1982)
- Where is Ahmed? (1963)
- The Meeting (1955)
- For the Sake of the Law (1968)
- Koroghlu (1960)
- Not that one, then this one (1956)
- The Magic Gown (1964)
- Shared Bread (1969)

== See also ==
- List of People's Artistes of the Azerbaijan SSR
