= Javahir Isgandarova =

Azerbaijani stage actress

- Born: Javahir Allahverdi gizi Isgandarova; 3 March 1914; Tbilisi, Georgia
- Died: 4 October 2003 (aged 89); Baku, Azerbaijan
- Occupation: actress
- Spouse: Aliagha Aghayev

Javahir Allahverdi gizi Isgandarova, also known as Javahir Isgandarova (Azerbaijani: Cəvahir İsgəndərova; 3 March 1914, Tbilisi – 4 October 2003, Baku) was an Azerbaijani theater actress, Honored Artist of the Azerbaijan SSR (1954). She was one of the founders of the Azerbaijan State Theater of Young Spectators in Baku.

== Life and career ==
Javahir Isgandarova was born on 3 March 1914 in Tbilisi. She studied at a girls’ school in Baku and from an early age was a member of a drama club. In 1927, Isgandarova played the role of Anna in the performance “Storm” by Latif Karimli. From that day, her career was connected with the Theater of Young Spectators where she was one of the founders.

Isgandarova was married to People's Artist of the Azerbaijan SSR, actor Aliagha Aghayev. The couple had two children, a son and a daughter. After the birth of children Isgandarova left theater to take care of her family. Her son Vagif Agayev worked as a director at the Musical Theater for a long time.

Javahir Isgandarova died on 4 October 2003 in Baku.
