= Maharram Hashimov =

Azerbaijani playwright

Maharram Hashimov Məhərrəm Haşımov
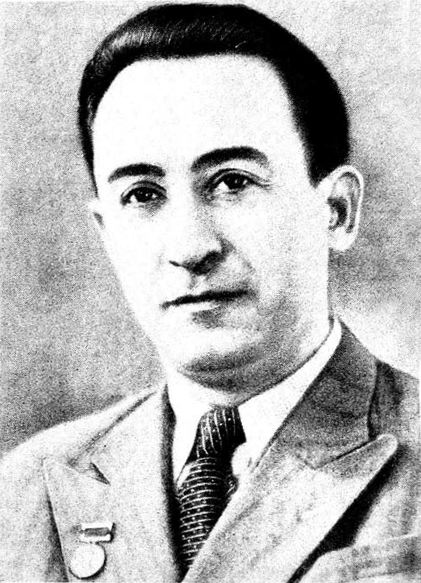
- Born: 2 February 1912; Baku, Baku Governorate, Russian Empire
- Died: 2 May 1969 (aged 57); Baku, Azerbaijan SSR, USSR
- Burial place: II Alley of Honor
- Occupation(s): theatre director, pedagogue
- Years active: 1928–1969
- Awards: Honored Art Worker of the Azerbaijan SSR Order of the Red Banner of Labour Order of the Badge of Honour

Maharram Zakir oghlu Hashimov (Azerbaijani: Məhərrəm Zakir oğlu Haşımov, 2 February 1912 — 2 May 1969) was an Azerbaijani theatre director, screenwriter, actor, film director, People's Artiste of the Azerbaijan SSR (1954), laureate of the Stalin Prize (1951).

== Biography ==
Maharram Hashimov was born on 2 February 1912 in Baku. He graduated from the Lunacharsky State Institute for Theatre Arts in 1936.

Until 1944, he worked as a director and chief director at the Azerbaijan State Theatre of Young Spectators. From 1948 to 1951, he worked as the chief director of the Azerbaijan State Academic Russian Drama Theatre. Maharram Hashimov worked at the Azerbaijan State Academic Opera and Ballet Theater in 1951–1956. From 1956 to 1960, he was again sent to the Russian Drama Theatre and acted as the chief director. Maharram Hashimov was engaged in pedagogical activities at the Azerbaijan State Theater Institute for many years.

In the first half of the 1960s, Maharram Hashimov headed the "Azerbaijanfilm" film studio named after Jafar Jabbarly, during his activity "Our Street", "Leyli and Majnun", "Big Prop", "Work and Rose", "Telephone Girl", "Ahmed where is it?", "Island of Wonders", "Romeo is my neighbor", "The Magic Gown" and many documentary films were shot.

Maharram Hashimov died in 1969 at the age of 57.

== Awards ==
List:

- Honored Artist of the Azerbaijan SSR
- Order of the Badge of Honour (25 February 1946)
- "Stalin" prize (3rd degree) — (1951, for the performance of Imran Gasimov's play "Dawns on the Caspian Sea" at the Azerbaijan State Russian Drama Theater).[1]
- People's Artiste of the Azerbaijan SSR (27 February 1954)
- Order of the Red Banner of Labour (9 June 1959)
- Mirza Fatali Akhundov State Prize of the Azerbaijan SSR (1969)

== Family ==
Maharram Hashimov was married to Rahile Ginzburg. Rahila Ginzburg was one of the famous theater actresses of Azerbaijan and worked in the theater where Hashimov was the director. Rakhile and Maherram had a daughter named Tamilla, who later became an Honored Journalist of Azerbaijan and worked in television.

== Awards ==
- People's Artiste of the Azerbaijan SSR — 27 February 1954
- Honored Art Worker of the Azerbaijan SSR — 23 April 1940
- Stalin Prize (3rd degree) — 1951
- Order of the Red Banner of Labour — 9 June 1959
- Order of the Badge of Honour — 25 February 1946
- Mirza Fatali Akhundov State Prize of the Azerbaijan SSR — 1969
