= Hovk =

Village in Tavush, Armenia

Hovk Հովք
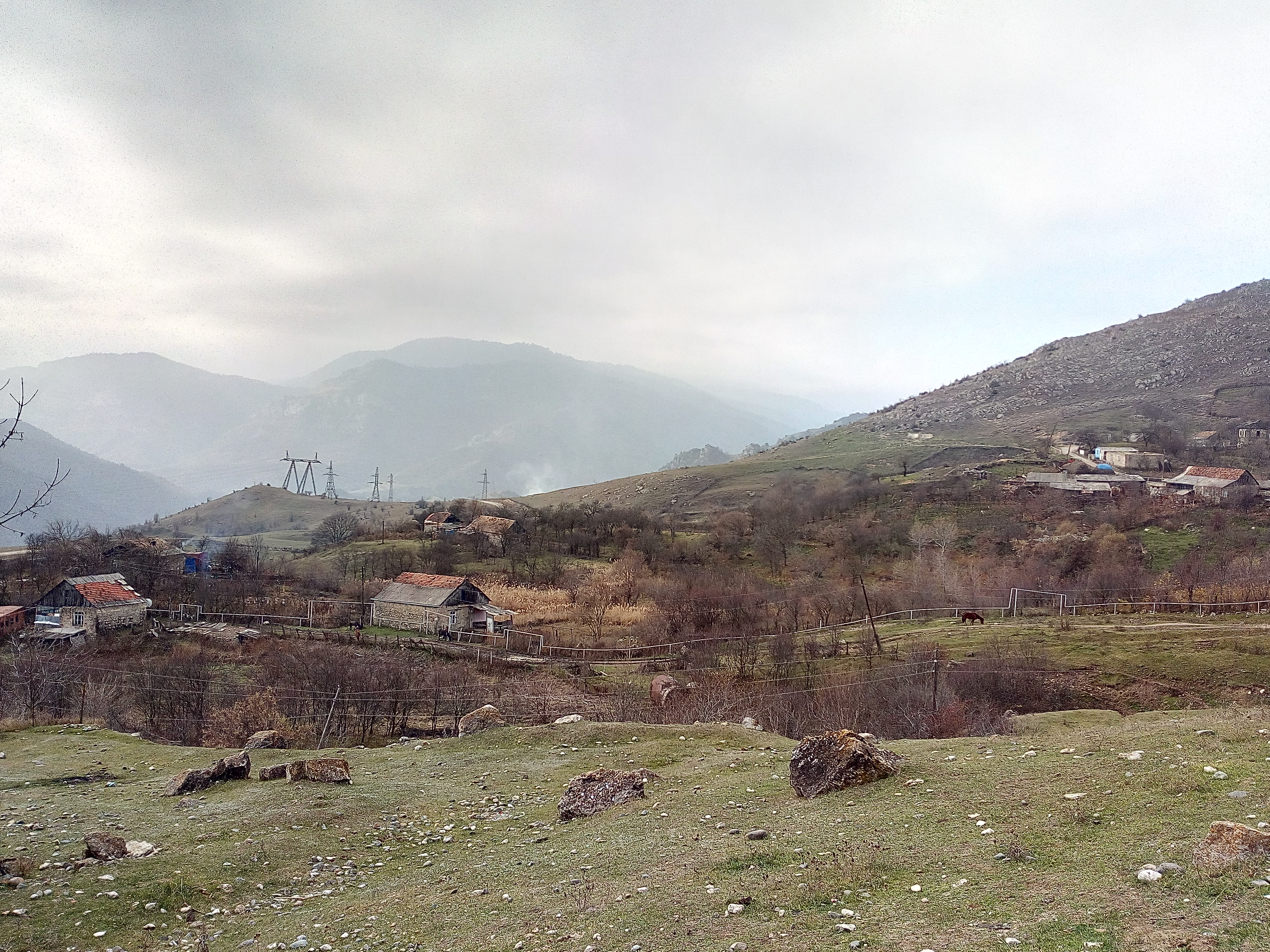

- Location within Armenia Location within Tavush
- Coordinates: 40°47′28″N 45°01′21″E
- Country: Armenia
- Province: Tavush
- Municipality: Dilijan

Population (2011)
  - Total: 435
- Time zone: UTC+4 (AMT)

Hovk (Armenian: Հովք) is a village in the Dilijan Municipality of the Tavush Province in Armenia. In 1988–1989 Armenian refugees from Azerbaijan settled in the village; refugees from Getashen, the villages of Shamkhor as well as from Martunashen (present-day Qarabulaq) resettled in the village.

== Etymology ==
The village was originally known as Haqqikhli. In 1978, it was renamed honor of Azerbaijani poet and dramatist Samed Vurghun (1906-1956), a winner of the Lenin Prize. After the independence of Armenia, on April 3, 1991, by the decision of the Supreme Council of Armenia, Samed Vurghun was renamed Hovk.

== Gallery ==
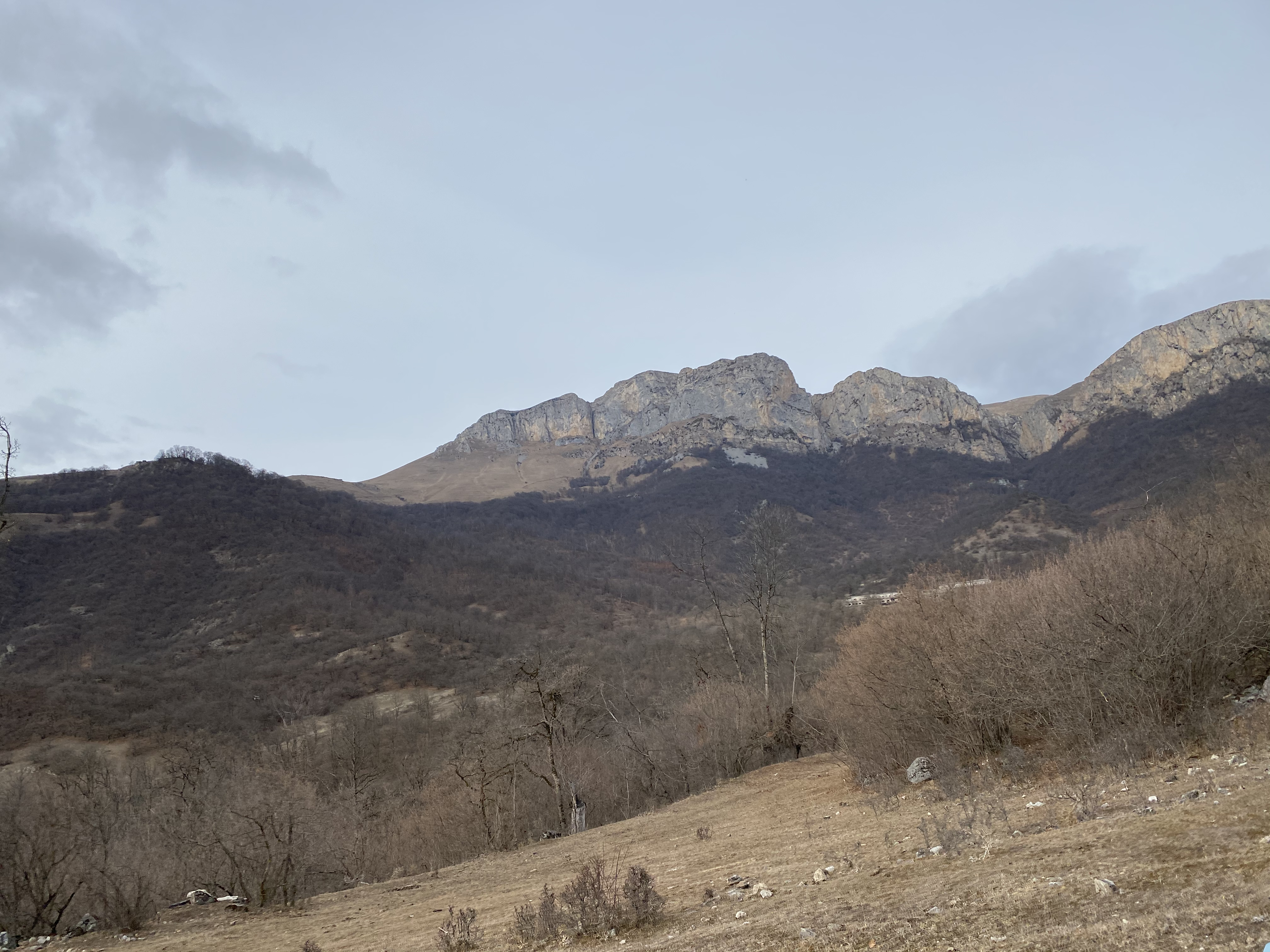
Nature around Hovk

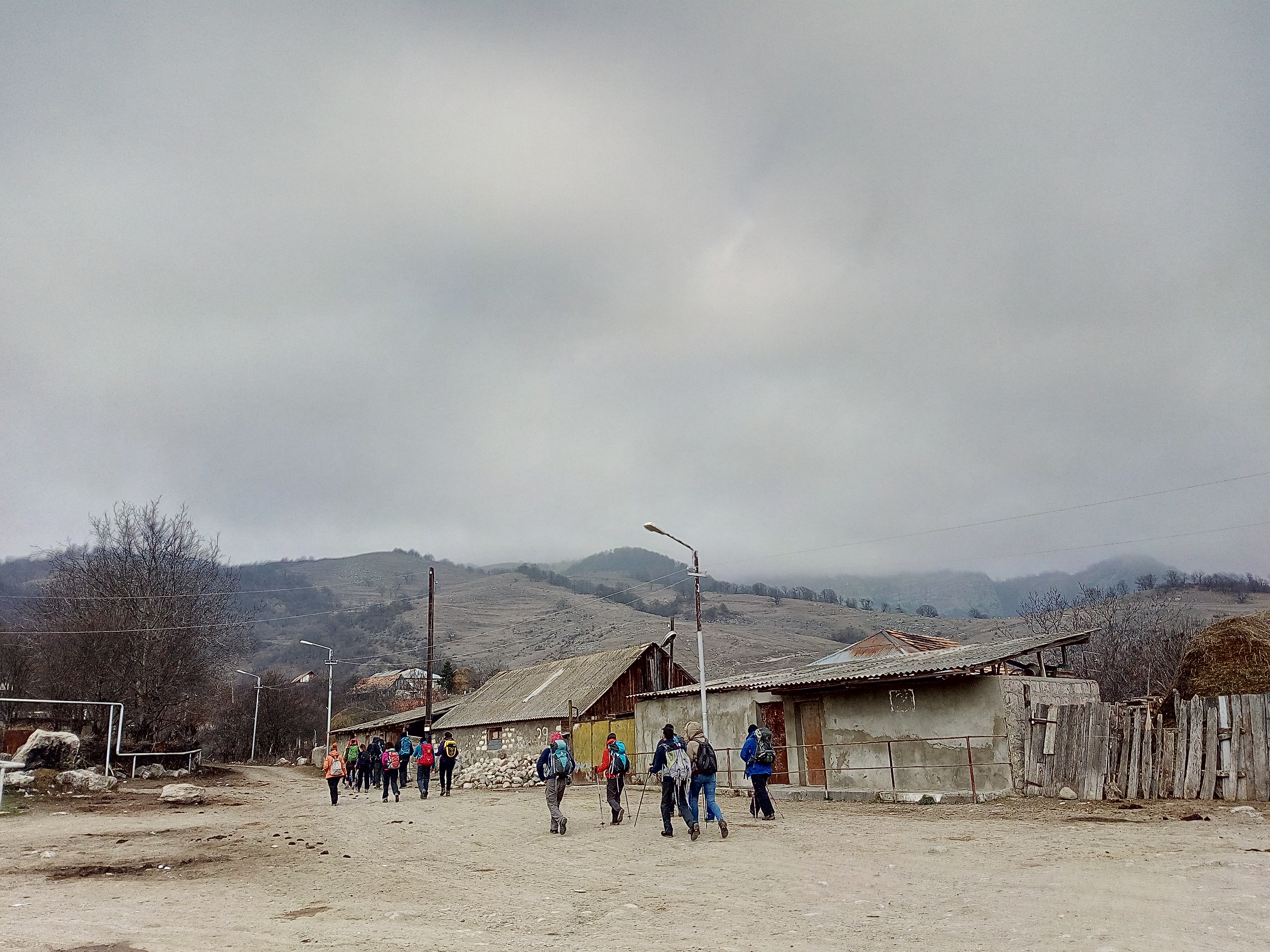
A view of Hovk

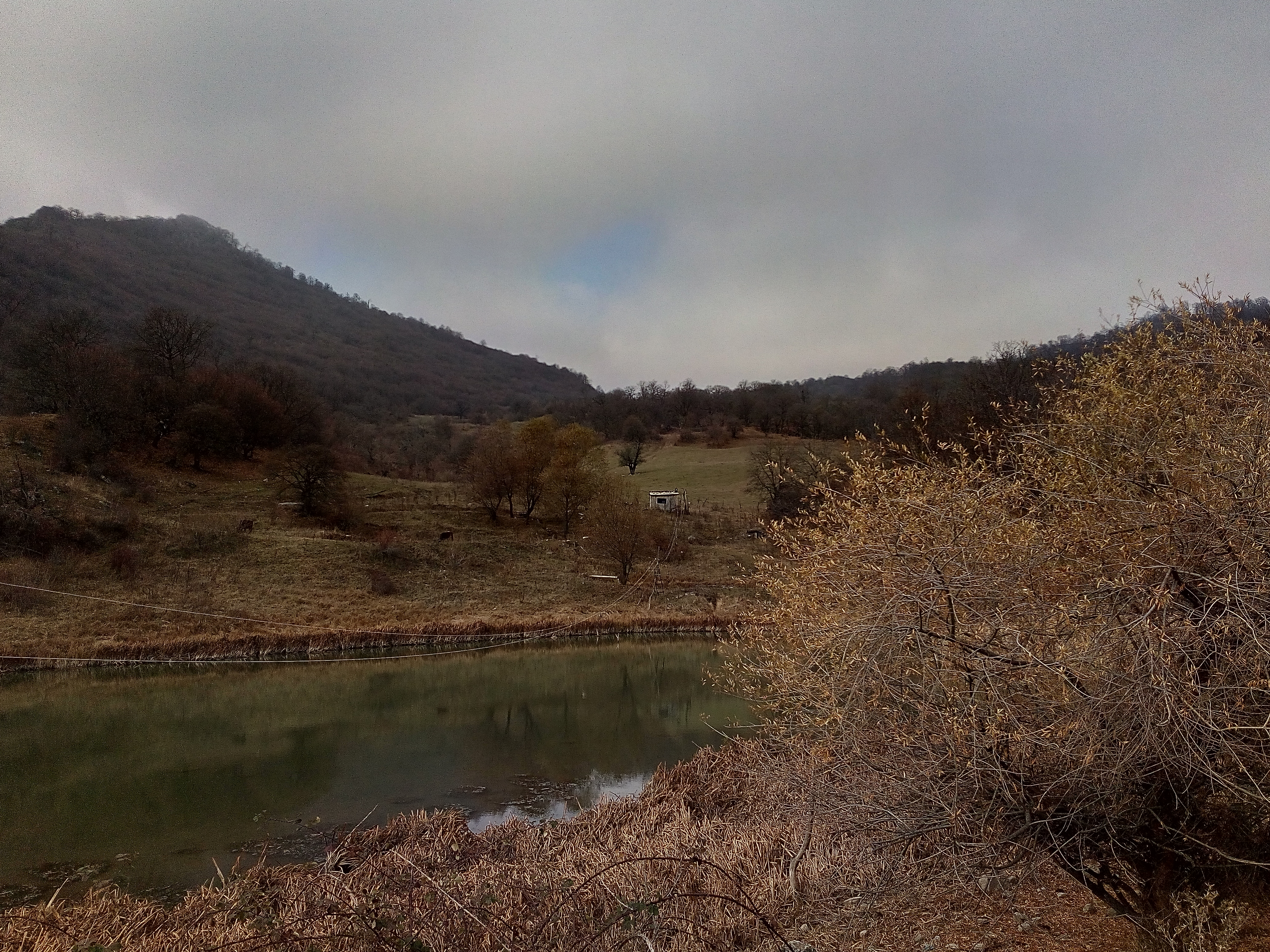
Nature around Hovk
