= Nasiba Zeynalova =

Azerbaijani actress (1916–2004)

Nasiba Zeynalova Nəsibə Zeynalova
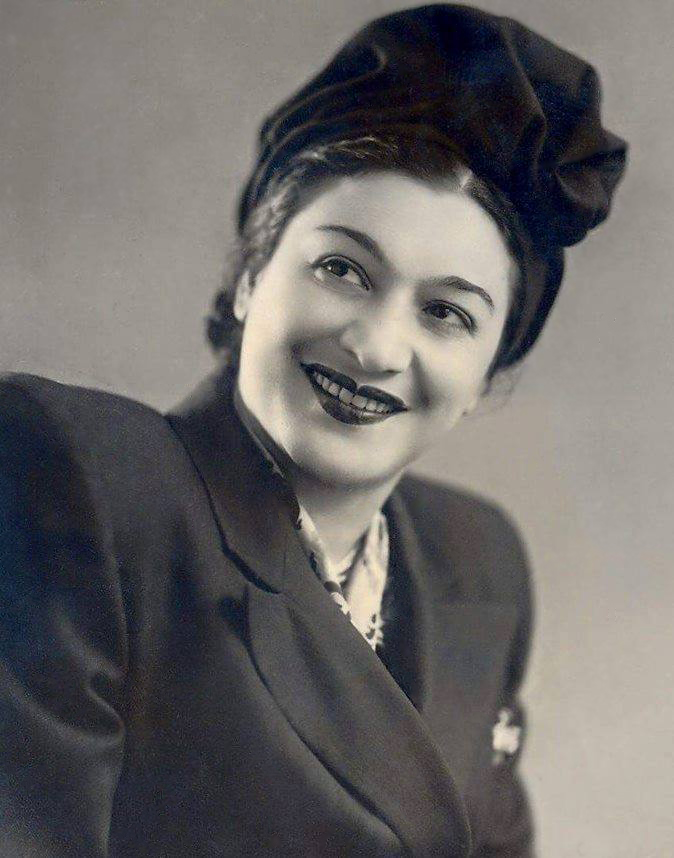
- Nasiba Zeynalova in the 1930s
- Born: 20 April 1916; Baku, Russian Empire
- Died: 10 March 2004 (aged 87); Baku, Azerbaijan
- Occupation: Actress
- Years active: 1932–2004
- Website: http://www.nasiba-zeynalova.az

Nasiba Jahangir gizi Zeynalova (Azerbaijani: Nəsibə Cahangir qızı Zeynalova; 20 April 1916 – 10 March 2004) was a Soviet and Azerbaijani actress. People's Artist of Azerbaijan SSR (1967).

== Life and career ==
Nasiba Zeynalova was born in Baku (then part of the Russian Empire, present-day capital of Azerbaijan), the daughter of merchant and stage actor Jahangir Zeynalov. Her father died during their trip back home in September 1918, via the Caspian Sea.

While in secondary school, she attended dance courses. In 1932 she joined Rza Tahmasib's drama club. In 1937 she joined a vagrant theatre troupe and toured several Azerbaijani towns. In 1938 she started working at the Azerbaijan State Academic Theatre of Musical Comedy. She earned a degree at the Baku School of Theatre.

In the following years, Nasiba Zeynalova acted in 22 films and around 70 plays, as well as in numerous television sketches. She is most remembered for the roles of Fatmanisa in Ogey ana (Stepmother, 1958), Sughra in Bizim Jabish muallim (Our Teacher Jabish, 1969), Jannat in Gayinana (Mother-in-law, 1978), and Auntie Asli in Beyin ogurlanmasi (The Kidnapping of the Groom, 1985). In 1967, she was named People's Artist of Azerbaijan SSR.

== Filmography ==
- Ögey ana (1958)
- Mollanın sərgüzəşti (1960)
- Böyük dayaq (1962)
- Ulduz (1964)
- Qanun naminə (1968)
- Bizim Cəbiş müəllim (1969)
- Dəli Kür (1969)
- O qızı tapın (1970)
- Bizim küçənin oğlanları (1973)
- 1001-ci qastrol (1974)
- Любовь с первого взгляда (1975)
- Xoşbəxtlik qayğıları (1976)
- Qaynana (1978)
- Mən mahnı bəsləyirəm (1978)
- За закрытой дверью (1981)
- Не бойся, я с тобой (1981)
- Bəyin oğurlanması (1985)
- Qəm pəncərəsi (1986)
- Xüsusi vəziyyət (1986)
- Gecə qatarında qətl (1990)
- Güllələnmə təxirə salınır (1993)
- Yuxu (2001)
- Məhəllə (2003)

== Memory ==
On March 17, 2016, the President of the Republic of Azerbaijan, Ilham Aliyev, signed a decree on the celebration of Nasiba Zeynalova’s 100th anniversary.

On January 18, 2017, a literary and artistic evening was held at the Azerbaijan Cultural Center in Vienna to commemorate the 100th anniversary of Nasiba Zeynalova’s birth. During the jubilee event, the feature film Mother-in-Law (Qaynana) was screened for the first time with German subtitles.

== Awards and titles ==
- Honored Artist of the Azerbaijan SSR (May 24, 1960)
- People's Artist of the Azerbaijan SSR (October 21, 1967)
- State Prize of the Azerbaijan SSR (1974)
- Order of the Badge of Honor (June 9, 1959)
- Order of the Red Banner of Labor (July 2, 1971)
- Order of the October Revolution (March 23, 1976)
- Order of Friendship of Peoples (August 22, 1986)
- Shohrat Order (April 20, 1997)
- Medal "Veteran of Labor" (October 30, 1978)
- Jubilee Medal "In Commemoration of the 100th Anniversary of the Birth of Vladimir Ilyich Lenin" (March 31, 1970)
- Medal "For the Victory over Germany in the Great Patriotic War of 1941–1945" (1946)
- Medal "For Valiant Labour in the Great Patriotic War 1941–1945"
- Jubilee Medal "Twenty Years of Victory in the Great Patriotic War 1941–1945" (1965)
- Jubilee Medal "Thirty Years of Victory in the Great Patriotic War 1941–1945" (1975)
- Jubilee Medal "Forty Years of Victory in the Great Patriotic War 1941–1945" (1985)
- Jubilee Medal "Fifty Years of Victory in the Great Patriotic War 1941–1945" (May 1, 1995)
- Personal Pension of the President of Azerbaijan (June 11, 2002)
- Azerbaijan Theater Workers’ Union "Theater Artist" Gold Medal (March 10, 2004)
