= Agadadash Gurbanov =

Azerbaijani actor (1911-1965)

- Ağadadaş Qurbanov
- Born: March 8, 1911; Baku, Baku Governorate, Russian Empire
- Died: June 22, 1965 (aged 54); Salyan, Azerbaijan SSR, USSR
- Occupation: Actor
- Years active: 1927–1965
- Spouse: Gulkhar Hasanova
- Children: 3

Agadadash Gurbanov (8 March 1911, Baku – 22 June 1965, Salyan) was an Azerbaijani theater and cinema actor, one of the founders of the Azerbaijan State Theatre of Young Spectators, performance artist in both tragedy, drama and comedy genre.

== Life ==
Agadadash Gurbanov was born on March 8, 1911, in Baku. The artist died on June 22, 1965. He was buried in Honorary Alley in Baku.

== Career ==
On March 15, 1927, Gurbanov made his debut performance in the play Storm by Latif Kerimli at the Club of Sailors. After that, Agadadash Gurbanov worked in the Workers' Theater of Children (later called the Theater of Young Spectators) in Baku until 1952. Gurbanov then acted in the National Drama Theater from 1952 until the end of his life.

== Theatre performances ==
Gurbanov performed in the following theatrical performances:

- Molla Ibrahimkhalil in Molla Ibrahimkhalil alchemist by Mirza Fatali Akhundzade
- Haji Gambar in Haji Qambar by Najaf bey Vazirov
- Karl Moor in The Robbers by Friedrich Schiller
- Khlestakov in The Government Inspector by Nikolai Gogol
- The Painter by Rabindranath Tagore
- Mirza Samandar in Almaz, Abu Ubeyd in Ad Bride, Ötgun in Return by Jafar Jabbarli
- Sheikh Marwan and Sheikh Sanan in Sheikh Sanan, Sayavush in Sayavush by Huseyn Javid
- Ibrahim Khan and Vagif in Vagif by Samad Vurgun
- Shults in Far on the shores by Imran Gasimov and Hasan Seyidbeyli
- Ivanov in Ophthalmologistas by Islam Safarli
- Demirchi Musa in Toy as by Sabit Rahman
- Jew in Marie Tudor by Victor Hugo
- The Rule of Love as Kemal by Jabbar Majnunbeyov
- Haji Kara in Haji Qara by Mirza Fatali Akhundzade
- Taghi Hussein by Javad Fahmi Bashgut
- Allan in Family name by Hussein Mukhtarov
- Guljamal inGood man by Mirza Ibrahimov
- Professor Mudrov in Shirvan Gözali by Anvar Mammadkhanli
- Akif in Hayat by Mirza Ibrahimov
- Ashraf Bey in Haji Qambar by Najaf bey Vazirov

== Filmography ==
- Sabuhi (1941)
- Shamdan bey (1956)
- Under the Burning Sun (1957)
- The Secret of the Mountain (1959)
- Koroghlu (1960)
- Our street (1961)
- The Telephone Operator (1962)
- Chained man (1964)
- Arshin mal alan (1965)
- Wool shawl (1965)
