= Zarrabi Mosque =

Mosque in Ganja, Azerbaijan

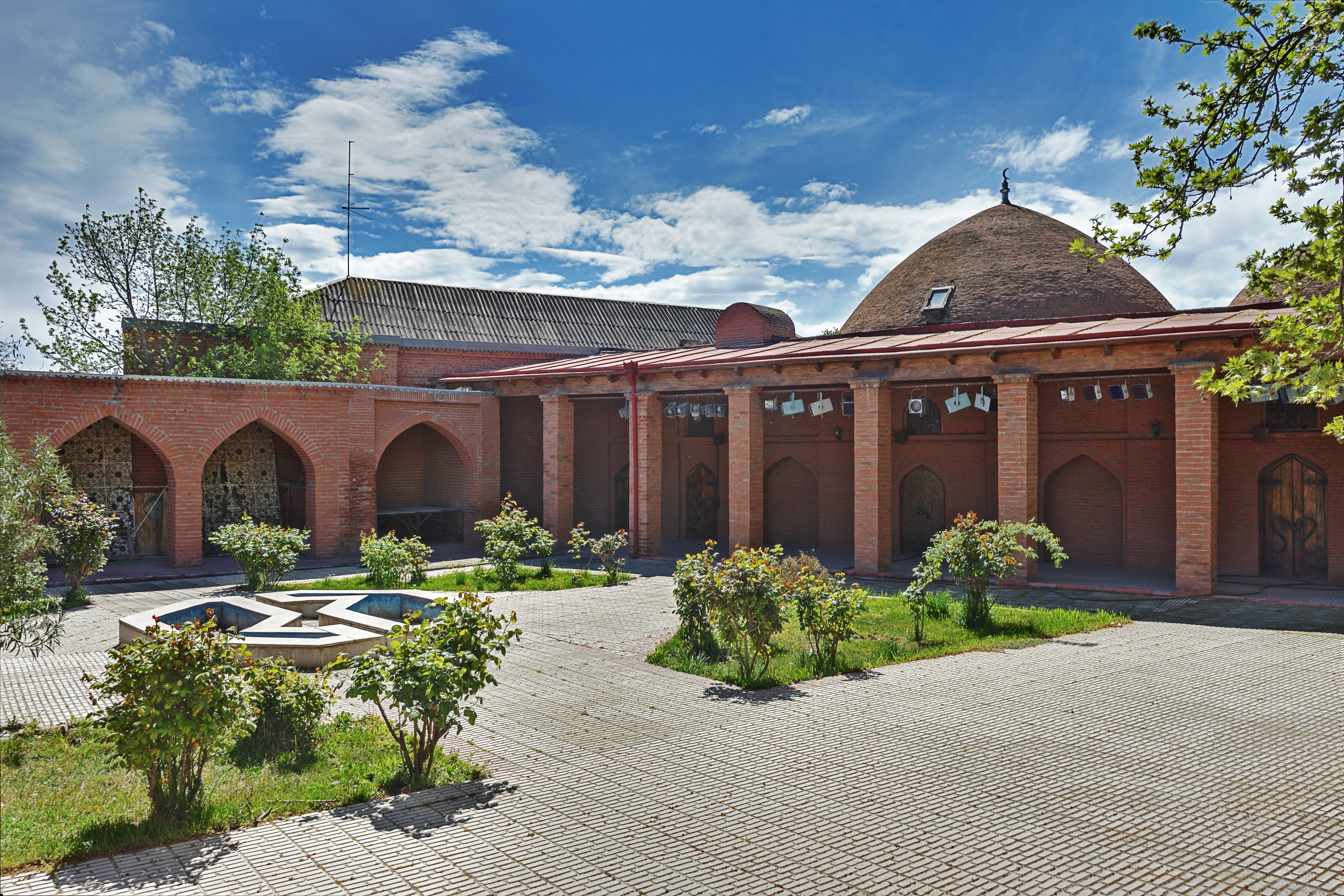
- The former mosque in 2019

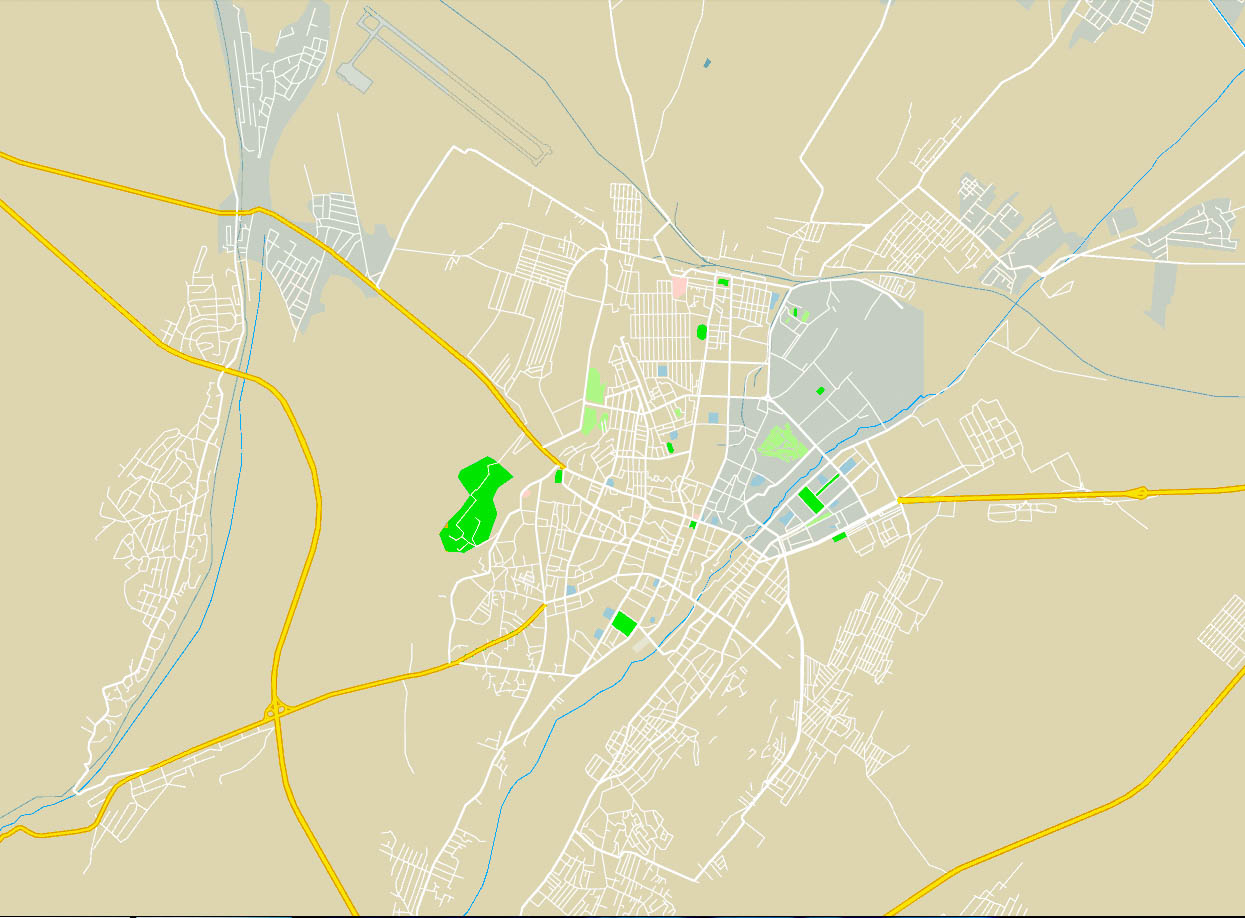
- Location of the former mosque in Ganja

Religion
- Affiliation: Islam (former)
- Ecclesiastical or organisational status: Mosque (19th century–1928); Residence (1928–1979); Theatre (since 1979)
- Status: Abandoned (as a mosque); Repurposed

Location
- Location: Ganja
- Country: Azerbaijan
- Coordinates: 40.670811°N 46.356359°E

Architecture
- Style: Arran School of Architecture
- Completed: 19th century
- Dome: Two

The Zarrabi Mosque is a former mosque and architectural monument located in the city of Ganja, Azerbaijan. The mosque was built in the 19th century and was included in the list of immovable historical and cultural monuments of local significance by the decree No. 132 issued by the Cabinet of Ministers of the Republic of Azerbaijan on 2 August 2001.

Abandoned as a mosque in 1928, the building was used as a residence, and then restored and purposed for use by the Ganja State Drama Theater.

== History ==
The Zarrabi Mosque was built in the 19th century in the Zarrabi neighborhood of Ganja city. Researcher Farrukh Ahmadov notes that the construction of this architectural monument was facilitated by prominent figures of the Zarrabi neighborhood, including Haji Kazanfar Karbalayi Agha oghlu, Mashadi Gasim Haji Ahmadli, Ali Bey Haji Alibeyov, Karbalayi Sur Abdullah oghlu, and others, and was funded by the local community. It is believed that a Zarrabi Mosque also existed in the territory of Ancient Ganja. However, that mosque was destroyed in the earthquake of 1139.

After the Soviet occupation of Azerbaijan, an official campaign against religion began in 1928. In December of that year, the Central Committee of the Communist Party of Azerbaijan transferred many mosques, churches, and synagogues to the balance of clubs to be used for educational purposes. While there were 3,000 mosques in Azerbaijan in 1917, this number dropped to 1,700 by 1927, 1,369 in 1928, and only 17 by 1933. During this period, the Zarrabi Mosque was also closed for worship, and its building was repurposed as a residential dwelling.

Later, local experts and cultural figures appealed to the city administration, requesting permission to house the Poetry Theater in the restored Zarrabi Mosque. The proposal was accepted, and the building was renovated and handed over to the creative team. From 1979 onwards, the Nizami Poetry Theater began operating in the building. Several performances based on motifs from Nizami Ganjavi's "Khamsa" were staged there. Although the theater initially operated on a voluntary basis until 1981, it was later allocated staff positions from the Ganja State Drama Theater.

After Azerbaijan regained its independence, the mosque was included in the list of immovable historical and cultural monuments of local significance by Resolution No. 132 of the Cabinet of Ministers of the Republic of Azerbaijan, dated 2 August 2001.

Since 2008, the building of the mosque, which housed the Nizami Poetry Theater, was merged with the Ganja State Drama Theater and now functions as its open-air stage.

== Architecture ==
The mosque is designed as a two-domed structure in the style of mosques with verandas. The building is divided into three parts: a large prayer hall with an area of 70 m^{2} (750 sq ft), a smaller room with an area of 30 m^{2} (320 sq ft), and a veranda 25 m (82 ft) long and 3 m (9.8 ft) wide. When there was no space left in the prayer room, worshippers would also use the veranda.

== See also ==
- Islam in Azerbaijan
- List of mosques in Azerbaijan
- Theatre in Azerbaijan
