= Adelina Adalis =

Soviet poet (1900–1969)

- Born: Adelína Efímovna Èfrón; 26 July 1900 Saint Petersburg
- Died: 13 August 1969 (aged 69)
- Occupation: Poet, writer and translator
- Genre: Prose poetry

Adelina Adalis (26 July 1900 – 13 August 1969) was a Soviet poet, prose writer and translator.

Alongside Valery Bryusov (1873–1924) and Nikolay Gumilev (1886–1921), she influenced Malaysian literature in the 19th and 20th century.

== Bibliography ==
- Bessonov, B. L. (1994). Ledkovskai︠a︡-Astman, Marina; Rosenthal, Charlotte; Zirin, Mary Fleming (eds.). Dictionary of Russian Women Writers. Greenwood Publishing Group. pp. 1–4. ISBN 9780313262654.
