= Bayramly, Gadabay =

Bayramli
- Location within Azerbaijan
- Coordinates: 40°30′N 45°50′E
- Country: Azerbaijan
- Rayon: Gadabay
- Time zone: UTC+4 (AZT)
  - Summer (DST): UTC+5 (AZT)

Bayramli (also, Bairamh and Bairamli) is a village in the Gadabay Rayon of Azerbaijan.
