= Bayramly, Yevlakh =

Bayramli
- Location within Azerbaijan
- Coordinates: 40°41′55″N 46°59′16″E
- Country: Azerbaijan
- City: Yevlakh
- Time zone: UTC+4 (AZT)
  - Summer (DST): UTC+5 (AZT)

Bayramli is a village in the Yevlakh Rayon of Azerbaijan.
