= Bayramlı, Shamkir =

Bayramli
- Municipality
- Location within Azerbaijan
- Coordinates: 40°55′59″N 45°55′31″E
- Country: Azerbaijan
- Rayon: Shamkir

Population
  - Total: 2,671
- Time zone: UTC+4 (AZT)
  - Summer (DST): UTC+5 (AZT)

Bayramli (also, Bayramly and Bajramli) is a village and municipality in the Shamkir Rayon of Azerbaijan. It has a population of 2,671.

- 15 kilometers from the center of the region.

== The history ==
At the village there are ancient city built «Baydar», relating to the period of 11th - 12th century.

== Population ==
The vast population are Azerbaijanis.

=== Notable people ===
Hasanova Gulkhar Ibrahim qizi (born 10 December 1918) - People's Artist of Azerbaijan.
