= Jahangir Zeynally =

Azerbaijani film director and screenwriter

Jahangir Zeynally Cahangir Zeynallı
- Born: 13 October 1949 (age 75); Baku, Azerbaijan SSR, USSR
- Occupation(s): film director, screenwriter

Jahangir Hasanagha oghlu Zeynally (Azerbaijani: Cahangir Həsənağa oğlu Zeynallı, born October 13, 1949) is an Azerbaijani film director and screenwriter, Honored Art Worker of Azerbaijan (2000).

== Biography ==
Jahangir Zeynally was born on 13 October 1949 in Baku. He studied at the directing faculty of the All-Union State Institute of Cinematography (1970-1975). After completing his studies, he started working at the "Azerbaijanfilm" cinema studio named after Jafar Jabbarly. He made about forty documentaries and one feature film.

On 18 December 2000 he was awarded the honorary title of Honored Art Worker of Azerbaijan.
