= The Stepmother (1958 film) =

- Azerbaijani: Ögey ana
- Directed by: Habib Ismayilov
- Written by: Habib Ismayilov, Anna Ian
- Screenplay by: Jeyhun Mirzayev; Najiba Malikova
- Music by: Tofig Guliyev
- Production company: Azerbaijanfilm
- Release date: 1958
- Running time: 82 min.
- Countries: Azerbaijan SSR, Soviet Union
- Languages: Azerbaijani, Russian, English

The Stepmother (Azerbaijani: Ögey ana) is a 1958 Soviet film shot at the Baku film studio by director Habib Ismailov. The film was shot in the village of Galajig, Ismayilli District. The film tells how Dilara, Ismail's stepmother, manages to win the love of her stepson, for which they both had to go through a difficult test.

== Plot ==
In one of the Azerbaijani villages where young Ismail (played by Jeyhun Mirzayev) lives, his father brings his wife Dilara (played by Najiba Malikova), who works as a doctor, and her daughter Jamila, Ismail's same age and half-sister. Ismail is a well-known mischievous person in the village and teases Jamila all the time, but does not like his stepmother. But he begins to hate her even more after Dilyara shows his father Ismail's school diary, in which there are only deuces. For this, Ismail's father, Arif (played by Fateh Fatullayev), does not take Ismail with him to the mountains, where he supervises the construction of the road.

One day, Ismail throws a bat to Jamila because she complained about him to her mother. Dilara, having learned about this, punishes the naughty boy. Ismail's opinion about his stepmother begins to change when he sees how she saved the life of a seriously ill man. He secretly does his homework and gradually gets used to the new "mother". During another children's fun - a game of racing - Ismail invites Jamila to cross the river, and the girl, having fallen into the water, catches a severe cold. Ismail is tormented by conscience. But then he recalls how his grandmother (played by Hagigat Rzayeva) treated him, giving him tea from a wild rose growing in the mountains. Ismail rushes to the mountains, not knowing that explosive work is being carried out there to build a road. Dilyara finds out where Ismail ran and runs after him, but does not have time. During the explosion, Ismail is seriously injured. Having lost a lot of blood, Ismail is on the verge of death. But Dilara gives him a blood transfusion, thereby saving his life. Waking up, Ismail hugs Dilara, calling her mom, not stepmother, as he did before.

== Awards ==
In the All-Union Film Festival held in Kyiv in 1959, the film was awarded the third prize.

== Connection with the film "Scream" ==
In the film Scream, filmed in 1993, Jeyhun Mirzayev played the grown-up Ismail, now the commander of a battalion fighting in Karabakh for the territorial integrity of Azerbaijan. In this film, at the time when Ismail's wife, along with his little son, are seeing off her husband to the war, there are shots from the film "Stepmother", where young Ismail, seeing off his father to construction work, cries because he did not take him with myself. It is also interesting that the film "Stepmother" is the first acting work of Jeyhun Mirzoev, and "Scream" is the last.

== Cast ==
- Jeyhun Mirzayev - Ismail
- Najiba Malikova as Dilara, Ismail's stepmother
- Fateh Fatullayev as Arif, Ismail's father
- Jeyhun Sharifov - Dadash
- Alasgar Alakbarov - Huseyn
- Hagigat Rzayeva as Gamar, Ismail's grandmother, Arif's mother-in-law
- Almaz Mammadova - Solmaz
- Gadzhimurad Yagizarov - Ayaz
- Nasiba Zeynalova as Fatma, mother-in-law of Gamer
- Ali Kurbanov - Kurbanali
- Shafiga Gasimova - Zeynab
