= Farhad and Shirin (play) =

Play by Samad Vurgun

Farhad and Shirin Azerbaijani: Fərhad və Şirin
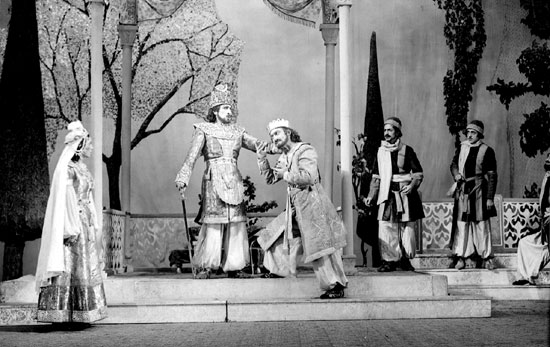
- Scene from the premiere production of the play
- Original language: Azerbaijani
- Written by: Samad Vurgun
- Genre: Drama

Premiere
- Date: 1941

"Farhad and Shirin" (Azerbaijani: Fərhad və Şirin) is the third play of the Azerbaijani poet Samad Vurgun, written in 1941. The play is based on the poem of the classic of poetry Nizami Ganjavi "Khosrov and Shirin". This play was considered one of the best examples of Nizami's poetic embodiment traditions in the Soviet literature.

== Analysis of the work ==
Samad Vurgun comprehensively studied the work of Nizami Ganjavi and embodied the theme of his poem in his play. According to the art critic Habib Babayev, if in Nizami's writing Shirin is consistent and constant in her actions, she fell in love with Khosrov and is faithful to her love to the end, then in Vurgun's work, Shirin loves not only Khosrov, but also Farhad. She kills herself over the corpse of Farhad, who became a victim of false news about the death of his beloved.

Unlike Nizami's poem, which shows the ennobling power of Khosrov's love for Shirin, Samad Vurgun has Khosrov's passion for Shirin - unkind and predatory. Unlike Nizami, Vurgun, as Babayev notes, Farhad and Khosrov are not rivals, they are enemies. In contrast to the traditions of the classical literature of the East, in which a woman was portrayed only as an object of love, in the play of Samad Vurgun, Shirin is shown more active, strong-willed and independent. The Soviet literary critic Arshaluis Arsharuni considers this interpretation of the image to be historically justified. According to him, “in the age of Nizami, in the era of the Eastern Renaissance, a woman really had independence”.

Samad Vurgun introduced into the play a number of new characters who are not in Nizami's poem. Among them is Azer-baba, Farhad's father, a spokesman of folk wisdom.

== See also ==
- Vagif

== Literature ==
- Aliyev, Gazanfar (1985). Темы и сюжеты Низами в литературах народов Востока. Наука. p. 338. - Premiered in Baku
- Guliyev, Jahid (1986). Навсегда в сыновья тебе дан: страницы жизни и творчества Самеда Вургуна. Azernashr. p. 203. - Premiered in Baku
- Babayev, Habib (1981). Самед Вургун: Очерк творчества. Советский писатель. p. 271. - Premiered in Moscow
