= Bayramlı, Tovuz =

Bayramli
- Municipality
- Location within Azerbaijan
- Coordinates: 40°54′39″N 45°40′09″E
- Country: Azerbaijan
- Rayon: Tovuz

Population
  - Total: 2,473
- Time zone: UTC+4 (AZT)
  - Summer (DST): UTC+5 (AZT)

Bayramli (also, Bayramly) is a village and municipality in the Tovuz Rayon of Azerbaijan. It has a population of 2,473.
