= Shikhali Gurbanov =

Azerbaijani writer, philologist and statesman

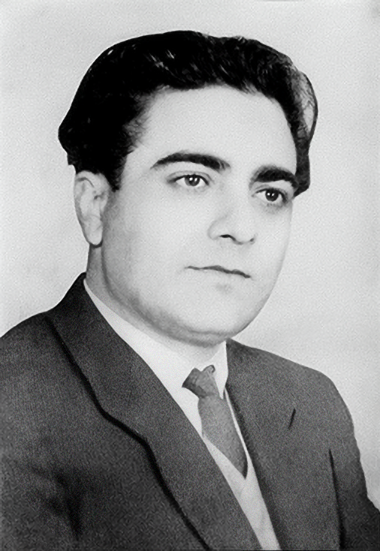
Shikhali Gurbanov

Shikhali Gurban oglu Gurbanov (Azerbaijani: Şıxəli Qurban oğlu Qurbanov; 1925, Baku—May 24, 1967, Baku) was an Azerbaijani writer, philologist and statesman. A street is named after him in Azerbaijan and is part of a culture sector of UNESCO intangible heritage.

== Assassination ==
On May 24, 1967, he was murdered by a lethal injection of cyanic acid, while visiting a dentist. The dentist escaped and was never found.

The murder reportedly happened shortly before the extraordinary plenum of Azerbaijan Communist Party, where Gurbanov was expected to be elected the First Secretary of the Party.

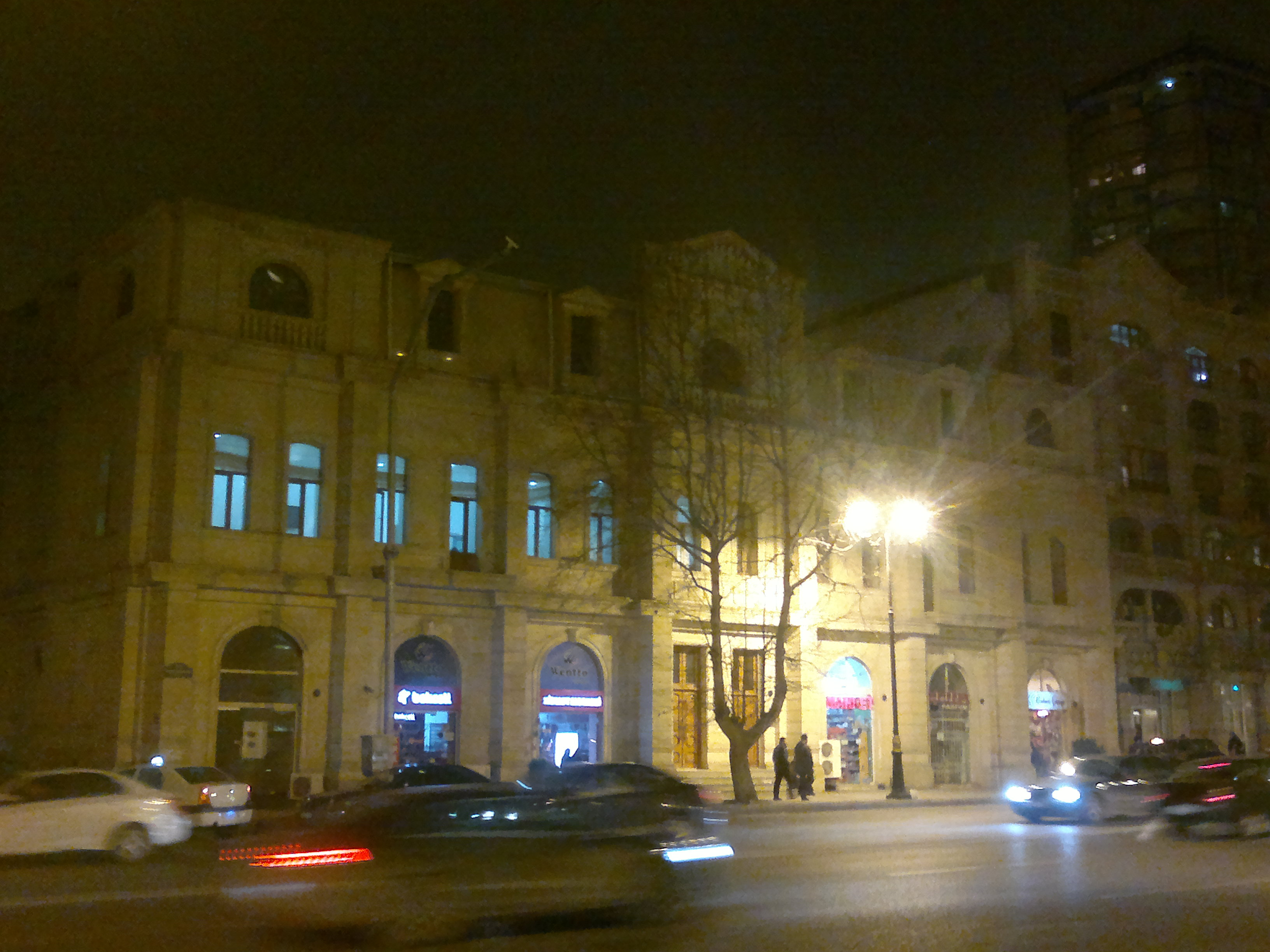
Building on Shikhali Gurbanov Street

== Bibliography ==
- Hasanli, Jamil (2015). Khrushchev’s Thaw and National Identity in Soviet Azerbaijan, 1954–1959. Harvard Cold War studies book series. Lanham: Rowman & Littlefield. ISBN 9781498508131.
