= Azerbaijan State Academic Russian Drama Theatre =

Theatre company in Baku, Azerbaijan

Azerbaijan State Russian Drama Theatre
- Səməd Vurğun adına Azərbaycan Dövlət Rus Drama Teatrı; Азербайджанский государственный русский драматический театр имени Самеда Вургуна
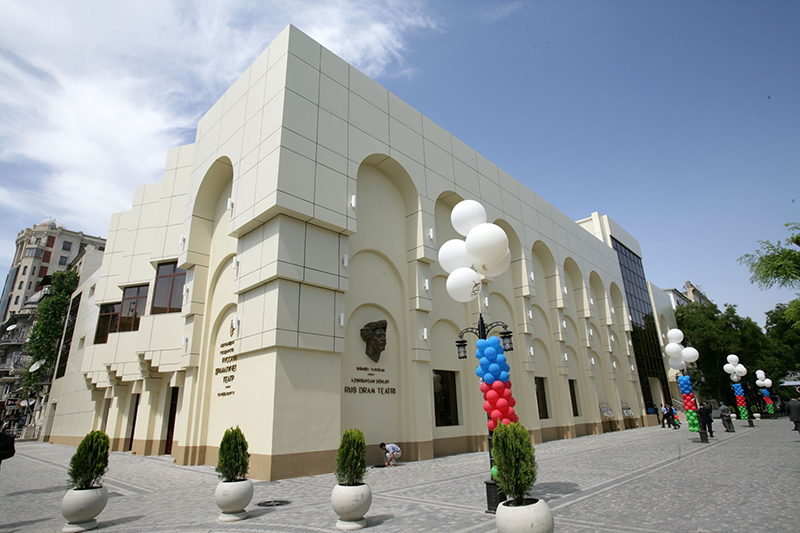
- Interactive map of Azerbaijan State Russian Drama Theatre
- Address: Xaqani Avenue, 7 Baku; Azerbaijan
- Coordinates: 40°22′21″N 49°50′27″E
- Type: Theatre

Construction
- Rebuilt: 2010
- Years active: Since 1937

The Samed Vurgun Azerbaijan State Russian Drama Theatre (Azerbaijani: Səməd Vurğun adına Azərbaycan Dövlət Rus Drama Teatrı, Russian: Азербайджанский государственный русский драматический театр имени Самеда Вургуна), is a performing art located in Baku, Azerbaijan, that produced plays in the Russian language. The performances of the theatre are mainly from the Russian works of art and literature, and the remainder are performances from Azerbaijani and European classical writers.

== History ==
At the end of the 19th century, Russian troupes began to actively perform in Baku. The most famous of these troupes was the theater group led by Polonsky. This troupe performed at the Tagiyev Theater for more than twenty years. The theatre, with its fixed repertoire, props and clothing stores, and many decorative designs, were performing five days a week. With the consent and permission of Polonsky, the building of the Tagiyev Theater was rented to various Azerbaijani theater groups on Fridays.

In February 1918, the building was exposed to a terrible fire. After this accident, the troupe began to collapse. In the spring of 1920, Russia's "Yarasa" theater made a tour of Baku. In April of the same year, the collective collapsed regarding with Red Army's attack. Some members of the troupe did not return to Russia and stayed in Baku. The State Theater of Independent Criticism and Entertainment ("Satiragit") was created in Baku to promote Soviet ideology with the forces of their local actors. Their first performance on the ideology of theater was on December 20, 1920.

The program of the first performances included "Lenin's Rhapsody", "Parrot" and "Karusel" small-scale scenic compositions which were suitable for the variety genre. Changing its repertoire very often, the theater began regular tours to worker districts in Baku. The theatre was renamed the Baku Workers' Theater in 1923 by the decision of the Baku City Executive Committee (in some sources it's called the Baku Russian Workers' Theater).

On October 25, the premiere of the play "The City in the Ring" took place at the theater for the first time. The new troupe consisted of actors who came from Moscow, Odessa, Irkutsk - S. Taneyev, K. Lavretsky, N. Snezhina, L. Litvinova, O. Lanskaya, N. Leshchinskaya, L. Morozova, A. Gorsky, N. Kolomensky, N. Sokolov, S. Klimov, N. Rogozhin and others. The repertoire of the theater was dominated mainly by revolutionary Soviet and foreign drama. From this point of view, "Lyubov Yarovaya" (Konstantin Trenyov), "Armored train 14-69" (Vsevold Ivanov), "Attack" (Vladimir Bill-Beloserkovski), "Bread" and "City of Winds" (Vladimir Kirshon) (Vsevold Vishnevski), "Mom" (Maxim Gorky), "My friend" and "Speed" (Nikolay Pogodin), "Intervensia" (Lev Slavin), "Plato's Crepe" and "Eskradron's Destruction" (Alexander Korneychuk) "(Vasili Gusev)," The Handbag "(Alexey Fayko) took a special place in the theater's creativity.

In 1924, the Practical Training Studio was opened at the Baku Workers Theater, which has been headed by the professionals of its field V. Fedorov and S. Maiorov (directors), M. Zharov (actor) since 1926. The troupe was replenished by artists Faina Ranevskaya, V. Kuznetsov, S. Efimenko and I. Shletenov.

In 1930, the theater was awarded the Red Flag Order for its services and creative successes in promoting revolutionary ideology. The theater, gradually transforming its creative character, the theme circle, expanding the genre searches, was called the Azerbaijan State Red Banner Theater of Russian Dramasince 1937.

In 1937, the theater was renamed the Azerbaijan State Red Banner Theater of Russian Drama. The theater began to make tours the cities of the North Caucasus and Transcaucasia, and later the cities of the entire Soviet Union with the work of directors D. Gutman, E. Loiter, A. Ivanov, F. Fedorov, S. Mayorov, E. Gakkel, A. Ridal, A. Tuganov, A. Gripich, I. Yaroslavsky, I. Idayatzade, K. Stepanova-Kolosova.

In 1956, the theater was named after poet-playwright Samad Vurgun.

The period 60–80 years the theatre's main performances were the works of the G. Akhmedova-Martynova, D. Selimova, I. Khasin, E. Sakharov, E. Beibutov, E. Aliyev, R. Ibragimbekov. The troupe replenished with the names of actors such as M. Yagizarov, T. Galakichieva, E. Nevmerzhitskaya, L. Dukhovnaya, D. Tumarkina, A. Sharovsky, N. Shashik-ogly, then R. Amirbekova, S. Mirzagasanov, L. Chesnakova, N. Tagieva, M. Maharramov, A. Nikushina, Yu. Baliev, N. Baliyeva and others.

Russian Drama Theater named after SamadVurgun was awarded two Orders of the Red Banner of Labor.

The Theater can be divided into three sections: Performances of world classics; performances of Russian classics; Contemporary drama plays by contemporary world and Russian playwrights; Performance of plays of classical and contemporary artists of Azerbaijan. The works by Azerbaijani authors are: "Horsepower" and "Vizier of Lenkoran Khanate" (Mirza Fatali Akhundzade), Sheikh Sanan (Hussein Javid), Aydin, Sevil and 1905, "Vagif", "Farhad and Shirin" and "Khanlar" (SamadVurgun), "The East of the East" (Anwar Mammadkhanli), "The Village Girl" (Mirza Ibrahimov), "You Are Always With Me" (Ilyas Efendiyev) Imran Gasimov and Hasan Seyidbeyli, "Dances on the Caspian" and "Life is so short ..." (Imran Gasimov), "Ports and tales" (Nebi Khazri), "Who will come in the middle of the night?", "Ultimatum", "Park", "Women behind the green door", "Investigation", "House on the sand", "Summer house for a family", "By his own way " (Rustam Ibrahimbeyov) "Summer days of the city" (Anar), "Ah, Paris ... Paris!" And "My husband is mad" (Elchin), "Day of the murder" (Yusif Samadoglu).

== Repertoire ==
Plays primarily to works of Russian literary figures such as Tolstoy, Pushkin, Chekov, Gogol, Lermontov, Mayakovsky, Lavrenyov, as well as Azerbaijani literary figures such as Jafar Jabbarli, Mirza Fatali Akhundov, Ali bey Huseynzade, Najaf bey Vazirov, Huseyn Javid, and also the works of other world literary figures such as Shakespeare, Schiller, Molière, Dumas, Hugo, Balzac, are staged in the theater in Russian. The theater makes performances not just for adults, but for children too.

== Tours ==
On October 25, 2013, Azerbaijan State Russian Drama Theater toured Moscow. The actors of the theater performed the famous comedy of Mirza Fatali Akhundzade, entitled "Monsieur Jordan and Dervish Mesteli Shah" at the Russian State Academic Theater. After this trip, staff of the Azerbaijan State Russian Drama Theater toured Vilnius, Lithuania.

In 2015, the theater toured St. Petersburg to perform "Masquerade" play by Lermontov and "Phaedra" by Jean Racine on the scene of the State Satire Theater on Vasilevsky.

== Directors ==
- Iran Tagi-zade - Honored Artist of Azerbaijan.

== Troupes ==
=== People's Artists of Azerbaijan ===
- Haji Muradov Yagizarov
- Lyudmila Duxovnaya
- Evgenia Nevmerzhitskaya
- Safa Mirzahasanov
- Mabud Maherramov
- Alexandra Nikushina
- Fakhraddin Manafov
- Natalia Sharovskaya

=== Honored Artists of Azerbaijan ===
- Natalia Balieva
- Ayan MirKasimova
- Fuad Osmanov
- Firdovsi Atakishiyev
- Melek Abbaszadeh
- Elena Spitsina
- Naina Ibragimova
- Elmira Aslanova

== Actors ==
- Maria Dubovitskaya
- Boris Brodsky
- Natavan Hajiyeva
- YaroslavTrifonov

- Hajar Agayeva
- ZaurTeregulov
- Farida Nesterenko
- Murad Mammadov
- Elshad Murtuzov

- Bella Safina
- Teymur Rahimov
- Oleg Amirbekov
- Rufat Nazarov
- Joseph Tkach

- Maksud Mammadov
- Salman Bayramov
- Madina Mullaeva

- Natik Huseynov
- Elmira Aslanova
- YagubZeynalov
- Lyudmila Saprykina

- Zumrud Mammadova
- Alexey Saprykin
- Inna Imranova
- Maya Vorobzhanska

- Maryam Adygozalova

== Painters ==
- Alexander Fedorov (Honored Worker of Culture of Azerbaijan)
- Olga Abbasova (Honored Worker of Culture of Azerbaijan)

== Repertoires ==
=== Performances for adults ===
- Athens evenings
- Ali and Nino
- Sunset Boulevard
- In the crystal palace
- Pride and Prejudice
- Lie detector
- Elchin: Hell lodgers.
- Fyodor Dostoyevsky: The Brothers Karamazov, family chronicles.
- Marriage
- Casanova: Love Lessons
- Masquerade
- Meme
- He, she, the window ... lover
- Autumn Sonata
- Petersburg lender
- Signor Todero-bully
- Get away from my dreams (Tahmina and Zaur)
- M.F Akhundzadeh: "Monsieur Jordan, a learned botanist, and dervish Mastalishah, the famous sorcerer", a comedy.
- Ceremony
- Nizami Ganjavi: "Seven beauties"
- Ceremony

=== For children ===
- Valentina Reznikova: "By the Pike Command", a fairy tale.
- Vladimir Neverov: "Guess a fairy tale-1", a fairy tale.
- Vladimir Neverov: "Guess a fairy-tale-5", a fairy tale.

== Gallery ==
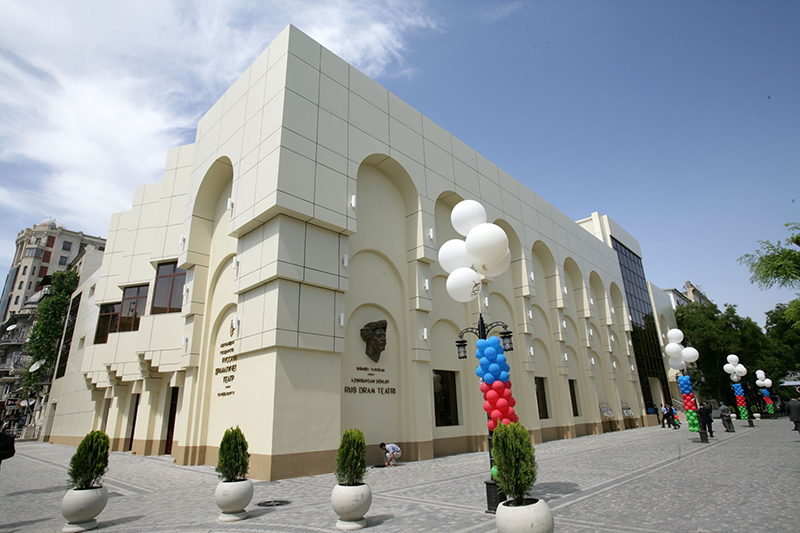

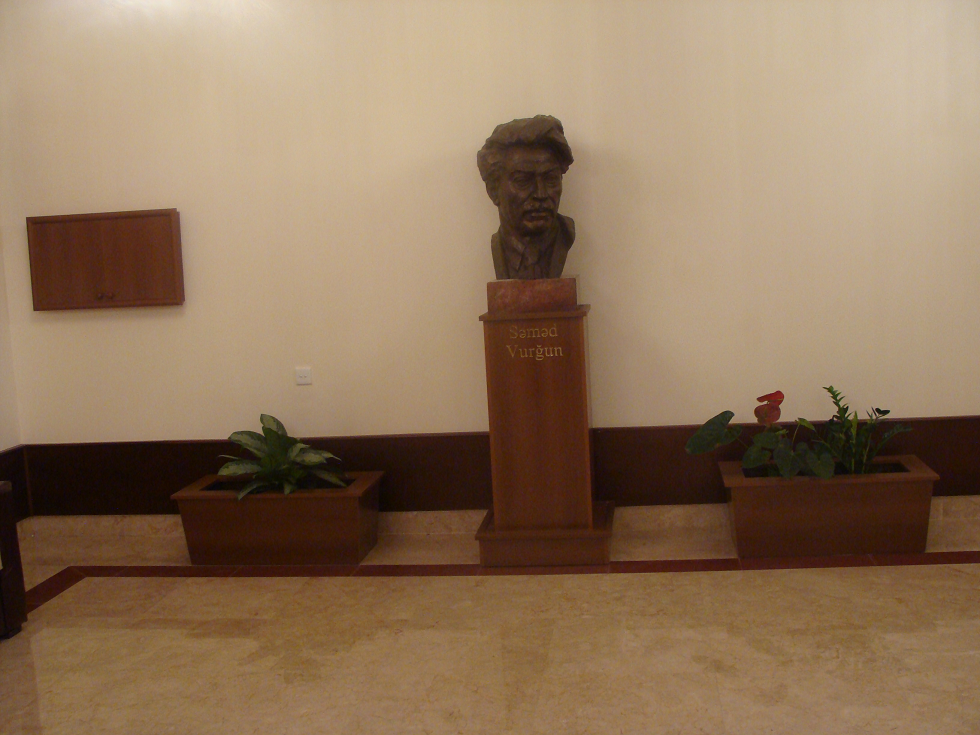

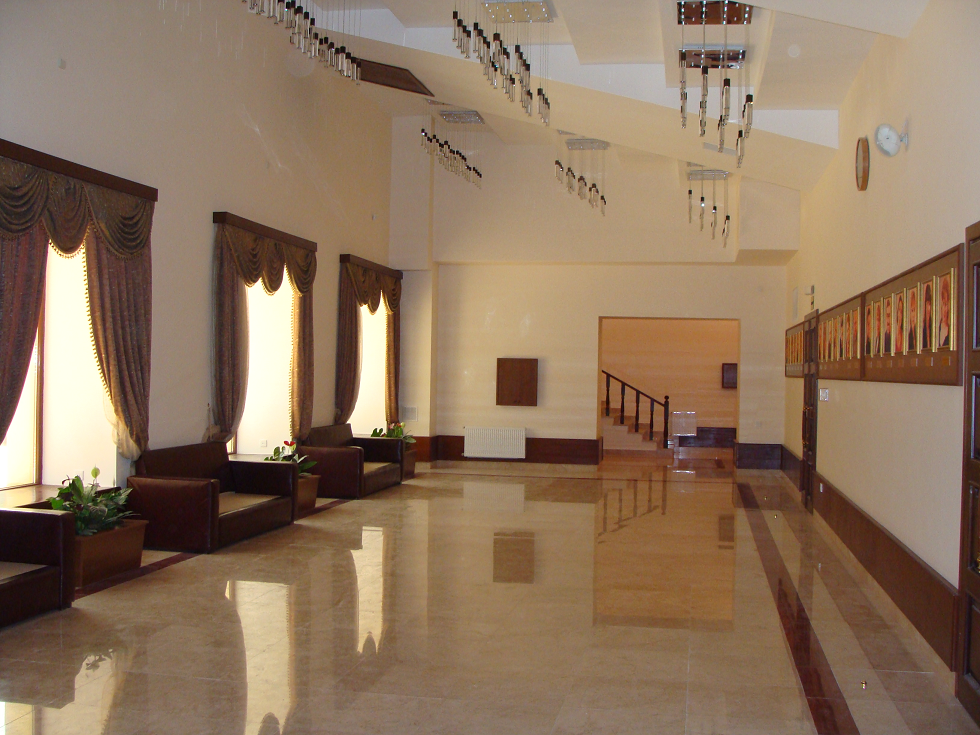

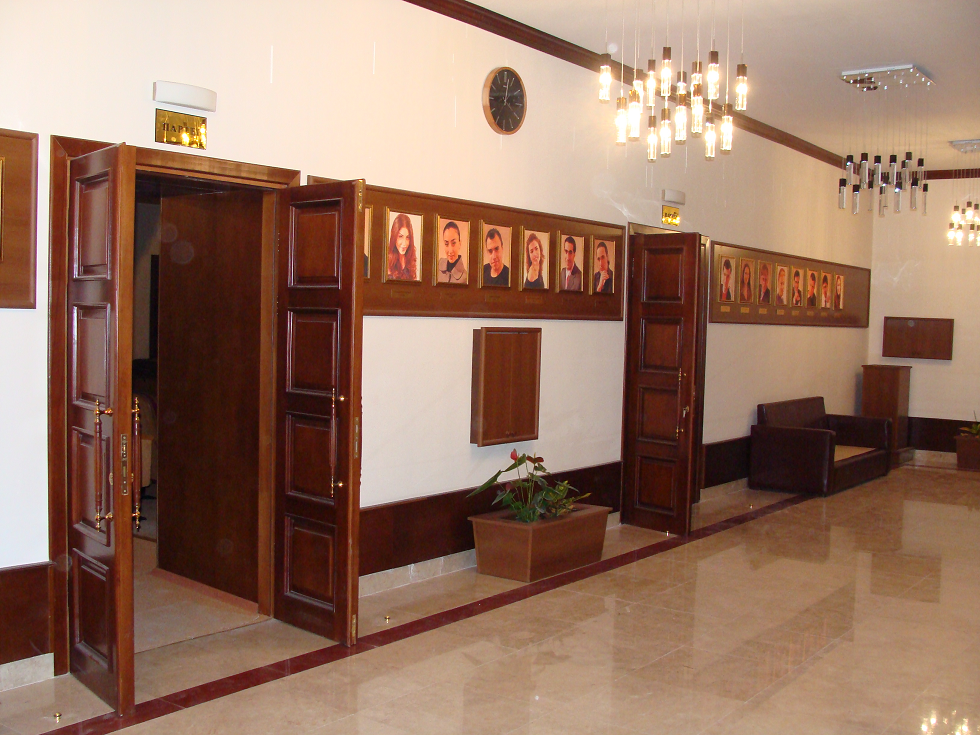

== See also ==
- Theatre in Azerbaijan
- Azerbaijan State Academic National Drama Theatre
- Azerbaijan State Theatre of Young Spectators
