= Fatma Gadri =

Azerbaijani actress

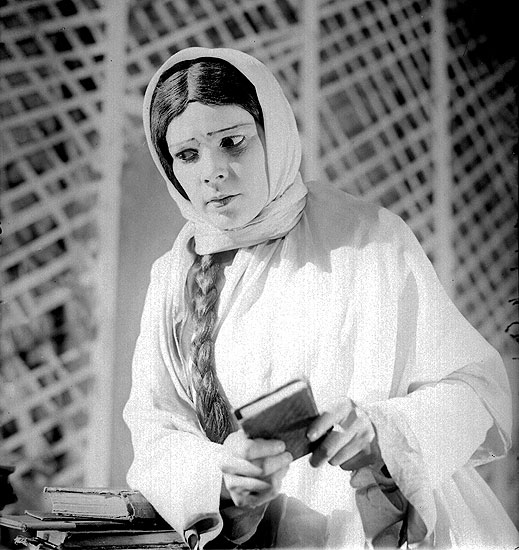
- Fatma Gadri as Gulbahar (play "My mother's book" by Jalil Mamedkulizade)
- Born: Fatma Gadir qizi Gadri; 14 April 1907; Odesa, Kherson Governorate, Russian Empire
- Died: 29 February 1968 (aged 60); Baku, Azerbaijan SSR

Fatma Gadir qizi Gadri (Azerbaijani: Fatma Qədri), also spelled Qadri, Kadri, or Kadry (14 April 1907 – 29 February 1968) was a Soviet and Azerbaijani stage and film actress. People's Artist of the Azerbaijan SSR (1943).

== Career ==
Fatma Gadri was born to a poor family of a merchant acolyte in Odesa (present-day Ukraine). At age 9, she began earning money by working as a full-time nanny for a child from a rich family. At her mother's insistence, she enrolled in a local madrasa (religious school) to receive primary education. In 1922, she was admitted to two post-secondary institutions simultaneously: the Azerbaijan Theatre School and a teachers college, from both of which she graduated in 1926. Choosing the artistic path for her future career, Gadri started working as an actress at the Turkic Labour Theatre in Baku and Ganja. After an unsuccessful surgery on her neck, she was allowed to quit her job at the theater to recover.

After a brief period of acting in the Baku Russian Theatre, she was hired to the Azerbaijan State Drama Theatre in 1935, where she worked for the next 24 years. Soon she was also elected to the Baku City Council and started teaching at the Azerbaijan Theatre School and at a music school in Baku. In 1943, she became People's Artist of Azerbaijan. Physically weak and exposed to illnesses, she often acted out her roles despite bodily pain. This led to emaciation in 1958, when Fatma Gadri suddenly fell unconscious at the Pushkin Moscow Drama Theatre, right before her final act in War and Peace by Sergei Prokofiev, during the troupe's tour in Moscow. After receiving medical treatment for seven months, the doctors forbade her from going up on stage again, fearing for her health.

== Personal life ==
Off stage, Fatma Gadri lived a difficult life. Her first marriage in the early 1920s did not last long, and her only son died in his teenage years. Gadri's second husband died of pneumonia in 1932. These tragic events added to her unstable health and psychological condition. Unable to overcome severe depression after being forbidden to perform in theaters, 60-year-old Gadri died by suicide in her apartment in 1968.
