= Ganja State Drama Theater =

Theater in Azerbaijan

- Gəncə Dövlət Dram Teatrı
- Ganja State Drama Theatre
- Interactive map of Ganja State Drama Theater
- Location: Azerbaijan, Ganja
- Coordinates: 40°40′18″N 46°21′42″E

Construction
- Built: 1980s

Ganja State Drama Theater (Azerbaijani: Gəncə Dövlət Dram Teatrı) is a theater in Azerbaijan.

== History ==
Ganja State Drama Theater (Azerbaijani: Gəncə Dövlət Dram Teatrı) was built by the German entrepreneur Christopher Forer in the 80's of the 19th century. In 1899, the building called "Theater" was given to amateur actors. In 1899, a building was given to amateur actors which they called “Theater”. In 1906 a theater troupe "Ganja Muslim Drama Assembly" was created.

The theater`s first building belongs to the 19th century. First Ganja State Drama Theater was established on November 13, 1921 in Baku. The Theater operated with the name “Tənqid-təbliğ” (Criticism-propaganda) as of 1925. But then the name of the Theatre was changed into “Bakı-işçi-kəndli” (Baku-worker-villager). In December 1932, the Theater moved to Ganja with all its staff and continued its activities here. Among the actors who came to Ganja were Ismail Talibli, Alasgar Alekperov, Aghasadig Garaybeyly, Aghahuseyn Javadov, Mehdi Mammadov, Kazim Ziya, Fatma Gadri, Amir Dadashli and Razmiya Veysalova. In 1933 an actor studio was created at the Theater. Also, the Department for Young Spectators was organized within the troupe.

In October 2014 the foundation of new building of Ganja State Drama Theater was laid within the framework of Presidential Decree. 3 million manat was allocated to the construction of the building. The new building with 13 thousand square meters is located on the bank of Ganja River.

== Festivals ==
The Ganja State Drama Theater participated in the V International Theater Festival that held in September 2012 in the city of Ufa in Bashkortostan. The theater performed the performance "Monsieur Jordan and Dervish Mastali Shah" of Mirza Fatali Akhundzadeh.

In May 2016 the Theater joined festival that held in Ukraine presenting the performance on piece of work by Jalil Mammadguluzade "The congregation of madmen."

In the same year the Ganja State Drama Theatre also attended International Festival held in the city of Konya of Turkey with Elchin's play "Killer" and performance on Turgay Nar's play "Game of Shahrazad".

In July 2018 the Ganja State Drama Theater took part in the 2nd International Theater Festival dedicated to the memory of popular Georgian writer Nodar Dumbadze in Georgia. Ganja State Drama Theater staged the story Helados.

== See also ==
- Theatre in Azerbaijan
- Zarrabi Mosque, used by the theater company for performances
