= Samad Vurgun =

Azerbaijani and Soviet poet, dramatist and academician

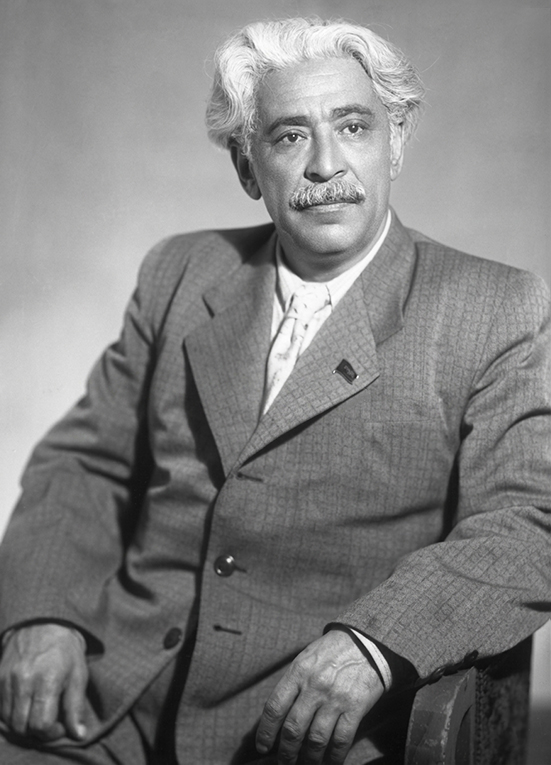
- Samad Vurgun in 1954
- Born: Samad Yusif oghlu Vekilov; 21 March 1906; Yukhary Salahly, Qazakh District, Azerbaijan
- Died: 27 May 1956 (aged 50); Baku, Azerbaijan
- Occupation: Poet

Signature
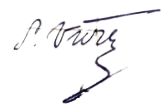

Samad Vurgun (Azerbaijani: Səməd Vurğun [sæˈmæd vuɾˈɣun]; born Samad Yusif oghlu Vekilov; (Note: Azerbaijani: Səməd Yusif oğlu Vəkilov, pronounced [sæˈmæd juˈsif oɣˈlu væˈkilof].) 21 March 1906 – 27 May 1956) was an Azerbaijani and Soviet poet, dramatist, public figure, first People's Artist of the Azerbaijan SSR (1943), academician of Azerbaijan National Academy of Sciences (1945), laureate of two Stalin Prizes of second degree (1941, 1942), and member of the Communist Party of the Soviet Union from 1940.

The Azerbaijan State Academic Russian Drama Theatre and streets in Baku and Moscow, and formerly the city of Hovk in Armenia, are named after him.

Samad Vurgun is the first poet in the literature history of Azerbaijan who was given the title “The Poet of Public”.

== Biography ==
Samad Vurgun was born on 21 March 1906 in Salahly village of Kazakh Uyezd, present day Qazax District of Azerbaijan Republic. Samad's mother died when he was six years old, and he was in the charge of his father and Ayshe khanim, his maternal grandmother. After graduating from school, his family moved to Qazax and Samad entered the teacher's seminary of Qazax with his elder brother Mekhdikhan Vekilov (1902–1975). In 1922, their father and a year later their grandmother died and concern for the future poet and his brother passed to their cousin Khangizi Vekilova. He taught literature at village schools in Qazax, Ganja and Quba. He studied at Moscow State University for two years (1929–1930) and then continued his education at Azerbaijan Pedagogical Institute.

In 1945, the poet was elected the full member of the Academy of Sciences of Azerbaijan SSR. Furthermore, the republican Society of Cultural Relations with Iran was founded in Baku in that year and S.Vurghun was assigned as the chairman of this society. The establishment of the spiritual bridge between Azerbaijan and Iran was achieved through the works of the poet.

Samad Vurghun was assigned the Vice President of Academy of Sciences of the Republic in 1953 in regard with the changes in the life of the country and Republic. He introduced important issues to the social sciences by discussing urgent problems and the project of scientific publication.

In October 1955, the poet fell ill on his visit to Vietnam as a member of the soviet delegation. As a result, he was hospitalized in Beijing, China. He wrote short poems when he was in hospital. He returned to Azerbaijan after a few weeks, but his health got worse.

In 1945, he was chosen as a full member of the Academy of Sciences of Azerbaijan SSR and deputy of the Supreme Soviet of the Soviet Union of the 2nd and 4th convocations (1946–1956).

Samad Vurgun died on 27 May 1956, and was buried in Baku, in the Alley of Honor.

== Works ==
His first work—a poem "Appeal to the youth"—was published in 1925, in "Yeni Fikir" (New Thought) newspaper in Tiflis. It was written as a graduation work from seminary. Samad Vurgun's poetical talent showed itself in the 1930-40s. His poetical collection of poems "Könül Dəftəri" (The Soul's Book) and the book "Şeirlər" (Poems) were published in 1934. During these years, our Literature and Dramaturgy prospered when the poet created new works using foreign words. There was a significant progress in his works in 1935. At that time, the poet created 7 voluminous poems and about 100 poems written in 1934. His poem "Azerbaijan" is one of the pearls of Azerbaijan Literature. His works cover not only the ancient history of Azerbaijan, natural beauties and recourses but also hospitality of Azerbaijani nation.

The poet's first book—"Şairin andı" (Poet's oath)—was published in 1930. The Great Patriotic War was of the utmost importance in Samad Vurgun's life. More than 60 poems, including "Bakının dastanı" (Legend of Baku) were written during wartime. During these years, Samad Vurgun's fame had increased. Leaflets with the poem "To partisans of Ukraine" were thrown from planes to forests in Ukraine to support partisans.

Samad Vurgun's "Ananın öyüdü" poem (Farewell speech of mother) received the highest mark in the contest of the best antiwar poem in the US, in 1943. In New York, the poem was chosen as one of the 20 best poems in world literature with a war theme and distributed among soldiers. In the same year, "House of Intellectuals named after Fuzuli" for holding events and meetings with fighting soldiers was opened on his initiative in Baku.

== Collected verses ==
- The Poet's Oath (1930)
- The Lamp (1932)
- The Parched Books (1947)

== Poems ==
- The Komsomol Poem (1933, unfinished)
- Even (1932)
- Muradkhan (1933)
- Khumar (1933)
- Lokbatan (1933)
- Village morning (1933)
- Death place (1934)
- Bitter memories (1935)
- 26 (1935)
- Gallows (1935)
- Dead love (1935)
- Rebellion (1936)
- Basti (1936)
- A Negro tells (1948)
- Mugan (1949)
- Reading Lenin (1950)
- Aygun (1951)
- The Standard Bearer of Century (1954)

== Dramas ==
- Vagif (1937)
- The sun is rising (1938–1939)
- Two Lovers (1940)
- Farhad and Shirin (1941)
- The Man (1945)

== Plays ==
- Vagif (1937). In this work Samad Vurgun described Molla Panah Vagif's tragic destiny.
- Khanlar (1939). Dedicated to revolutionary Khanlar Safaraliyev's life.
- Farhad and Shirin (1941). Poetica drama based on Nizami's "Khosrow and Shirin" poem's motifs.
- Human (1945).

== Translations ==
- In 1936, Samad Vurgun translated A.S. Pushkin's "Eugene Onegin" poem into Azerbaijani and was conferred "A.S. Pushkin" Medal by the Committee of Pushkin.
- In 1936, Samad Vurgun translated part of Shota Rustaveli's "The Knight in the Panther's Skin" poem and was conferred an honorary diploma of the Georgian SSR.
- In 1939, Samad Vurgun translated Nizami's "Layla and Majnun" poem.
- He also translated a lot of poems of Taras Shevchenko, Maxim Gorky, Ilia Chavchavadze and Zhambyl.

== Awards ==
- People's Poet of the Azerbaijan SSR (1956)
- Stalin Prize of the second degree (1941) – for "Vagif" play
- Stalin Prize of the second degree (1942) – for "Farhad and Shirin" play
- Two Lenin Orders

== Family ==
He was married to Khaver khanim Mirzabeyova and had three children:

Sons: Yusif Samadoglu – People's Writer of Azerbaijan and Vagif Samadoglu – National poet of Azerbaijan (2000) and recipient of Istiglal (Independence) Order (June 2014).

Daughter: Aybeniz Vekilova – Honored Culture Worker.

== Poems dedicated to Samad Vurgun ==
"Speech of my friend Samad Vurgun at lunch in London" – Konstantin Simonov
"To Samet Vurgun" – Nâzım Hikmet

== Memory ==
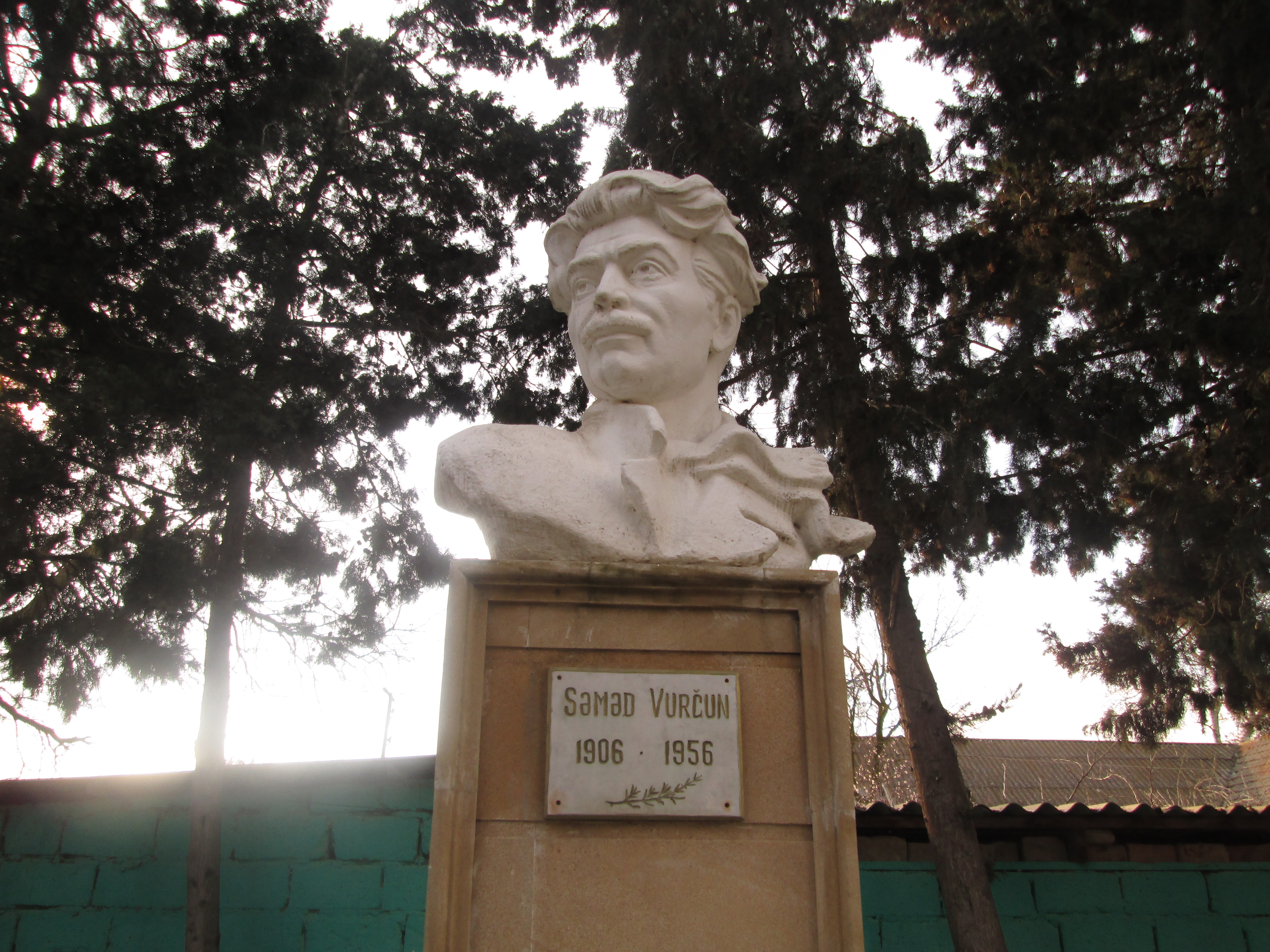
Bust of Samad Vurgun

- In 1976, was released a post stamp of the USSR, dedicated to Samad Vurgun.
- In 2006, was released a post stamp of Azerbaijan, dedicated to Samad Vurgun.

In Azerbaijan 70 streets, 7 libraries, 20 schools, 5 palaces of culture, 5 parks, 4 cinemas are named after Samad Vurgun. (Before the USSR collapse there were 38 collective farms) A street in Moscow (Russia), and Derbent (Dagestan); a library in Kyiv (Ukraine); school #257 in Dushanbe (Tajikistan); a technical school in Plovdiv (Bulgaria); Azerbaijan State Academic Russian Drama Theatre, and a township in Qazax are named after Samad Vurgun.

== Sources ==
- Great Soviet Encyclopedia, 3rd ed.
