= Azerbaijan State Theatre of Young Spectators =

Theater in Baku

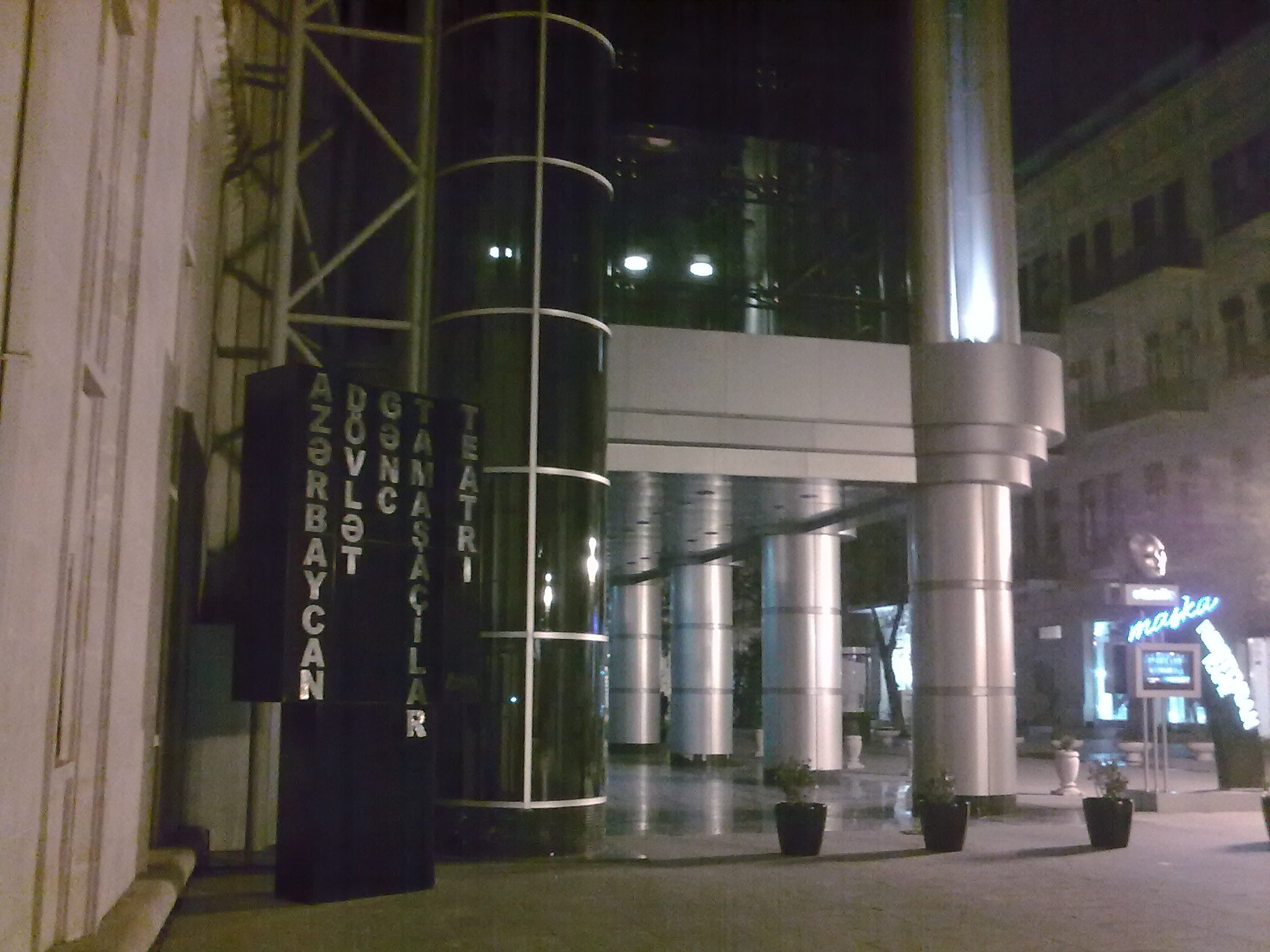

- Location within Azerbaijan

General information
- Location: Baku, Azerbaijan
- Coordinates: 40.3740°N 49.8428°E
- Construction started: 1928

Azerbaijan State Theater of Young Spectators (Azerbaijani: Azərbaycan Dövlət Gənc Tamaşaçılar Teatrı) is a theatre located in the centre of Baku, Azerbaijan.

== History of the theater ==
Azerbaijan State Theater of Young Spectators (ASTYS) was founded in 1928 as Baku Children's Theater according to the Decision of the Commissariat of Public Enlightenment of Azerbaijan dated September 20, 1928. The initial group of actors and directors of the theatre included Aghadadash Gurbanov, Mammadagha Dadashov, Yusif Eminli, Mina Abdullayeva, Yusif Dadashov, Susanna Majidova, Javahir Isgandarova, Suleyman Alasgarov, Huseynagha Sadikhov, Karim Hasanov, Zafar Nematov, Maharram Hashimov, and Alimammad Atayev.

The Russian section of the theater started its activity on November 6, 1928, when a Russian troupe made a performance of the play “Five people” by N.Smirnov and S.Serbakov here for the first time. An Azerbaijani troupe, created on the basis of drama circle of pioneers affiliated with the Baku Club of Sailors became a member of this theatre, in 1930.

Azerbaijani section started on January 30, 1930, with “Against Red tie" by N.Ivanter.

In the first years of its existence, the theatre staged plays of Russian writers, which were constituted the repertoire of Young Spectators' Theatres of other cities of the USSR. In the 1930s, plays of Azerbaijani dramatists were included in the repertoire of the theatre: In the streets by Jafarov and Melik-Yeganov (1932), Nargiz (1936), Ayaz (1937), Gizil Gush (Golden bird) by Seyidzade (1938), and Mammad the Partisan by Isgandarov and Sabit Rahman (1939).

In 1936, the theater was named after Maxim Gorky.

Baku Children's Theater was renamed based on the order of the Commissariat of Public Enlightenment of Azerbaijan on July 18, 1936, and has been called “Azerbaijan State Theater of Young Spectators” since then. The ASTYS was awarded with the Republic Lenin Komsomol Prize Laureate in 1978 and the Order of Honor in 1979.

Azerbaijan State Youth Theater and Baku Camera Theater were united to ASTYS according to the decisions of Cabinet of Ministers of Azerbaijan dated respectively on March 19 and September 30, 2009.

Children's and Youth Theaters of Azerbaijan State Theater of Young Spectators became member of the International Association of Theater for Children and Young People (ASSITEJ) in May 2011 and the national center of ASSITEJ was opened in Azerbaijan after a while.

The small stage of the Theater considered for mono and small volume plays was inaugurated in December 2013.

== Festivals ==
The ASTYS's troupe has been attending international theatre festivals since 2006:

Events	Date	Location	Performance
Gala concert of the 2nd International Theatre Festival	December 2006	Podolsk city of Moscow Oblast, Russia	Fragments from "Arshin mal Alan" operetta by Uzeyir Hajibeyov
International April 23 Children's Festival	April 2007	Alanya, Turkey	"Good and Evil" by Nizami Ganjavi, "Mother Goose" by Rasul Rza and "Play and dance" by Iskandar Joshgun
International April 23 Children's Festival	April 2008	Ankara and Ighdir, Turkey	"Grandma’s trick" by Ahmad Oruj
9th International Theater Festival of Turkic-speaking countries	May–June 2009	Kazan, Russia	"Pary jadu" by Abdurrahim bey Hagverdiyev
12th International Festival of Antique Art	June 2010	Simferopol	"Aesop" by Guilherme Figueredo
32nd International Festival "Fajr"	February 2011	Qurqan, Iran	"Othello" by William Shakespeare
2nd International ArtOkraina mono and small-scale festival of performances	November 2011	Saint Petersburg	"Contrabass" by Patrick Süskind
5th Monodrama International Theater Festival	January 2012	Al-Fujairah Emirate, UAE	"At last..." by Peter Turrini
33rd International Festival "Fajr"	February 2012	Iran	"Don Raffaele il trombone" by Peppino De Filippo
17th International "Belaya Veja" theater festival	September 2012	Brest, Belarus	"Don Raffaele il trombone" by Peppino De Filippo
Colombo International Mono-spectacles Festival	March–April 2013	Sri-Lanka	"Contrabass" by Patrick Süskind
1st Sheki International Theater Festival	September 2014	Sheki, Azerbaijan	"I came, Girls" ("War") by Lars Noren
19th "Belaya Veja" ("White Castle") International Theater Festival	September 2014	Brest, Belarus	"Without words" by Samuel Beckett
1st International Martin McDonagh Festival	October 2014	Perm, Russia	"The Lonesome West" - part of Leenane trilogy by Martin McDonagh
17th Black Sea International Theater Festival	April–May 2016	Trabzon, Turkey	"Old Clown" by Matei Vișniec
21st International Youth Theater Festival "Russian Classics"	May	Lobnya city of Moscow Oblast, Russia	"Diary of a Madman" by Nikolai Gogol
8th International Theater Festival "Gostniy Dvor"	May–June	Orenburgh, Russia	"I came, Girls" ("War") by Lars Noren
2nd International Martin McDonagh Festival	October 2016	Perm, Russia	"The Beauty Queen of Leenane" by Martin McDonagh
11th International Mono-spectacles Festival "Atspindys"	October	Vilnius and Visaginas, Lithuania	"Without words" by Samuel Beckett
3rd International Theater Festival "Hot Heart"	April 2017	Kineshma, Ivanovo Oblast, Russia	"Diary of a Madman" by Nikolai Gogol
14th International Folks Art Festival "Friendship Wreath"	June–July 2017	Bobruysk, Mogilev Oblast, Belarus	"Contrabass" by Patrick Süskind
6th International Festival "Tuganlig" of Turkic speaking theaters	September 2017	Ufa, Russia	"Punishment" by Tamara Valiyeva
1st International Theater Festival "Keyeda" for children and youth	September–October 2017	Elista, Russia	"Tik-tik khanim" by Abdulla Shaig
"Maria" International Mono-Performances Festival	October 2017	Kyiv, Ukraine	"Contrabass" by Patrick Süskind
36th International Theater Festival "Fajr"	January 2018	Tehran, Iran	"Punishment" by Tamara Valiyeva
8th International Theater Olympics	March 2018	India	"Punishment" by Tamara Valiyeva

== Repertoire ==
ASTYS's repertoire includes plays of foreign (William Shakespeare, Martin McDonagh, Hans Christian Andersen, Aleksey Tolstoy) and domestic playwrights, such as Huseyn Javid, Jafar Jabbarli, Mirza Fatali Akhundzada, Ilyas Afandiyev, Suleyman Rustam, Abdurrahim bey Hagverdiyev, Abdulla Shaig, Nizami Ganjavi, Suleyman Sani Akhundov for both adults and schoolchildren.

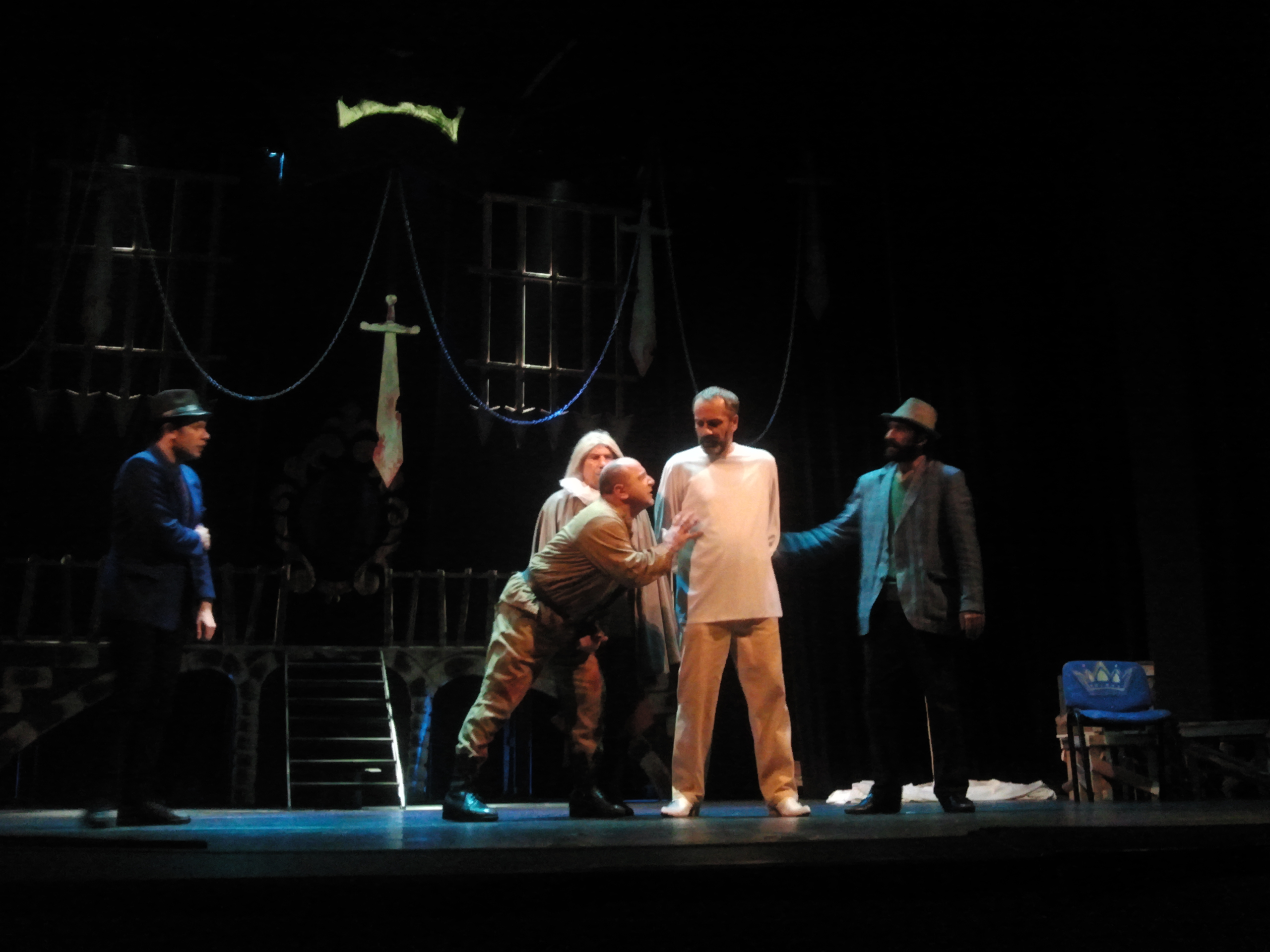
Richard III (Spectacle of Azerbaijan State Theatre of Young Spectators). Directed by Jannat Salimova

Classical drama plays of Russian and foreign dramatists, plays of the Soviet writers and dramatists were also staged on the theater, such as The Government Inspector by Nikolai Gogol, Servant of Two Masters by William Shakespeare, and How the Steel Was Tempered by Nikolai Ostrovsky.

== Projects ==
- "The theater, education and morality";
- "We love the theater";
- "The first student card, the joy of the first acquaintance with the theater";
- "The personalities in the Heights";
- "Martyrs are immortal, homeland is indivisible";
- "I want to talk about theater".

== Theatre personnel ==
Managing director of the ASTYS is Naida Ismayilzada. Bahram Osmanov is the chief director of the theatre.

=== Actors ===
Yasin Garayev, Aghakhan Salmanli, Almaz Mustafayeva, Atabala Safarov, Naiba Allahverdiyeva, Gurban Ismayilov and others.

== See also ==
- Theatre in Azerbaijan
- Azerbaijan State Academic National Drama Theatre
- Azerbaijan State Academic Opera and Ballet Theater
