= Bride of Fire =

Play by Jafar Jabbarli

Bride of Fire Azerbaijani: Od gəlini
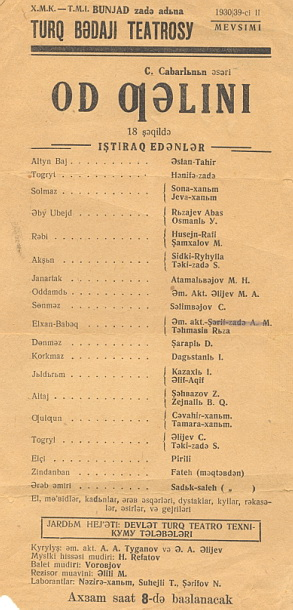
- Plays program. Turkic Art Theatre named after Buniatzade. Season 1930/31
- Written by: Jafar Jabbarli
- Original language: Azerbaijani
- Genre: historical Tragedy

Premiere
- Date premiered: 1928
- Place premiered: Azerbaijan State Academic Drama Theatre

"Bride of Fire" (Azerbaijani: Od gəlini) is a historical tragedy written in 1927 by the Azerbaijani playwright Jafar Jabbarli. It is the first significant work of Jabbarli of the new season. The tragedy is dedicated to Babek uprising against the Arab Caliphate. It was staged for the first time in 1928 in Baku.

== History of creation ==
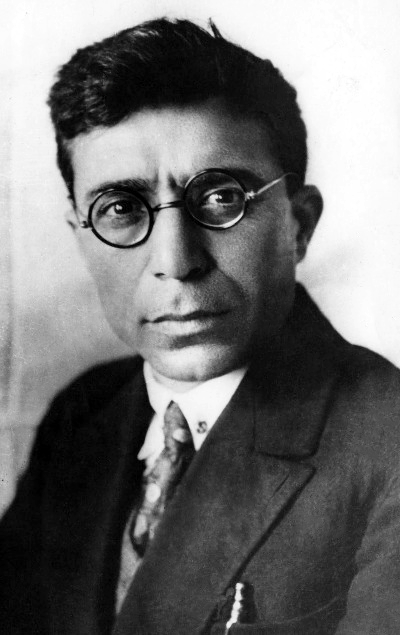
Jafar Jabbarli, the author of the play

The tragedy "Bride of Fire" is dedicated to the real events of the 9th century of the commander Babek fight who led the national liberation movement against the Arab-Islamic conquerors. Babek served as a prototype for the main character of the play - Elkhan.

Initially, the play was called "Babek", but Jafar Jabbarli did not want to limit the ideological and thematic framework of the work to a specific historical event, but sought to give it a broader content.

The work on the play began back in 1925, when Jabbarli finished and presented its first version to the theatre. This version, cumbersome in volume and was imperfect in ideological and artistic terms, consequently this did not satisfy neither the author himself nor the theatre. Therefore, Jafar Jabbarli continued to work on the play, he significantly reduced it and achieved a serious improvement in the artistic qualities of the creation. The Director Alexander Tuganov writes in his memoirs:

“The best example of how carefully Jabbarli worked on the creation, how he strove to perfect every word, is the play the "Bride of Fire".

As Alexander Tuganov recalls in his memoirs, in the three years of hard work, Jabbarli turned 38 scenes of the original version into 18. Having adopted a new version of the play, the theatre began to work intensively on it.

== Production history ==
After "Hamlet" (staged in December 1926), the "Bride of Fire" became the first performance, on the preparation of which the Azerbaijan State Theatre spent so much time and work. The "Bride of Fire" was shown on 16 February 1928 on the stage of the Azerbaijan Drama Theatre. According to Jafarov, “no other work has caused such great enthusiasm in the collective”. The director Alexander Tuganov, also admitted this:

For the many years of my stage activity, when I had to conduct many exciting and creatively rich performances. Undoubtedly, the most exciting one was the Bride of Fire.

The practice of those years did not know any other cases when the same performance went on for several days in a row. The "Bride of Fire" was the first performance to run for four days in a row and then went on with great success for many years. The long stage life of the "Bride of Fire", according to the theatre expert Jafar Jafarov, was explained, “firstly, by the high merits of the play itself, and, secondly, by the fact that the theatre created a spectacular performance, magnificent in terms of brightness and beauty”

The music for the play the "Bride of Fire" was written by the 20-year-old composer Afrasiyab Badalbeyli. This was one of the first works of the composer.

== Analysis of the play ==
A shot from the production of the play the "Bride of Fire". Abbas Mirza Sharifzade as Elkhan, Marziyya Davudova as Solmaz, Ulvi Rajab as Altunbai

In the play the "Bride of Fire", according to the art critic Ismayil Tagi-zade, the protagonist Solmaz is a servant of the fire-worshipers temple and her plot line is only the nominal centre of the work, its main character is Babek. The theatre critic Jafar Jafarov, calling the work a kind of historical-romantic drama, writes that it has no documented history nor historical figures. At the same time, as writes Jafarov, it is historical and paints a “plausible historical picture of fight” of the people “against the Arab invaders and the Islamic religion”.

Elkhan's monologue in the Bride of Fire

The literary critic Mammad Arif writes that the tragedy the "Bride of Fire", staged in the Azerbaijan Drama Theatre in 1928, was "a landmark event in the ideological and artistic development of the national drama". According to Mamed Arif, this play was directed against the Islamic religion. The literary critic Orujali Hasanov wrote that in the play "Bride of Fire" one can already see "the manifestation of the most resolute, mature, and deepest atheism." Hasanov writes that in his last monologue, which Elkhan utters under the gallows, he boldly throws: “No Allah! No Allah! I myself am Allah! I am the creator of life and happiness on earth!”

According to the musicologist Naila Kerimova, until 1928, namely, before the staging of Jabbarlis new historical and heroic play "Bride of Fire", the musical arrangement of the Azerbaijani performances "did not go beyond the framework of the musical editing". Nailya Kerimova notes that the “Bride of Fire” “became a bright event in the theatrical life” and marked the next stage in the development of the theatrical music genre in Azerbaijan, being associated with the name of the young composer Afrasiyab Badalbeyli.

== Pictures ==
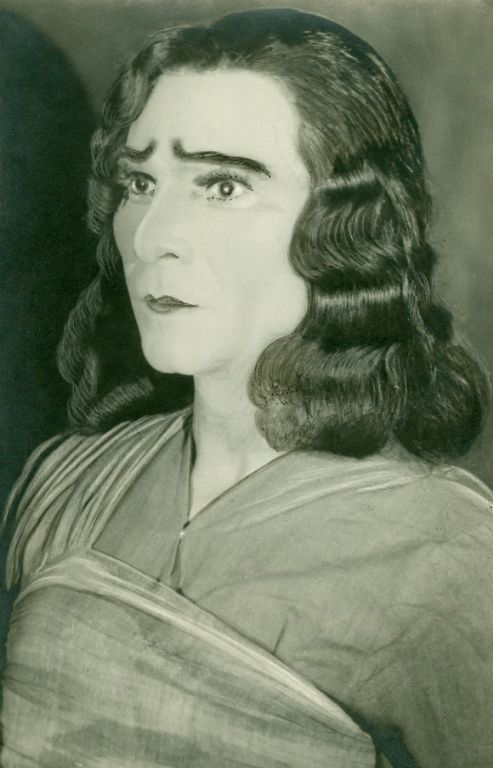
Abbas Mirza Sharifzadeh as Elkhan in Bride of Fire

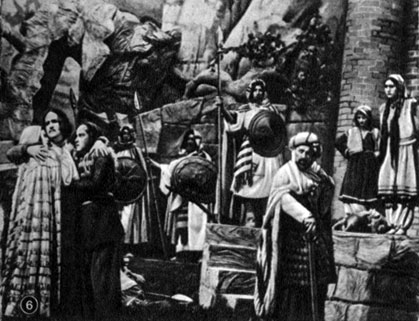

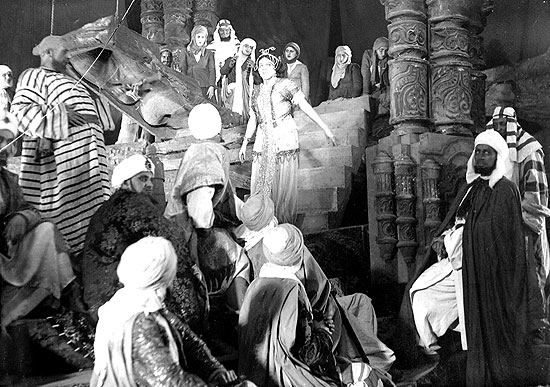

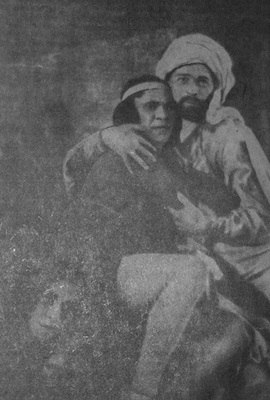

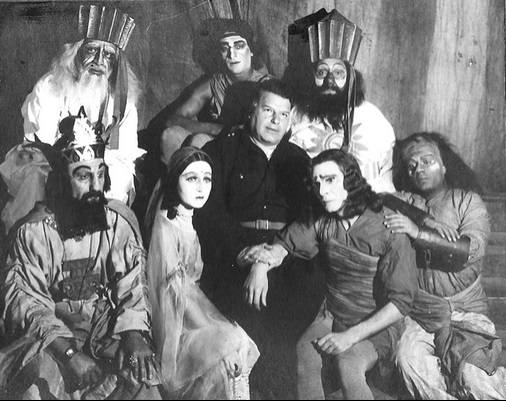
The actors starring in the play, together with the director Alexander Tuganov

== See also ==
- Siyavush
- The Devil
- Sheikh Sanan
