= Səmədabad =

Səmədabad or Samedabad or Samadabad may refer to:

- Səmədabad, Bilasuvar, Azerbaijan
- Səmədabad, Goranboy, Azerbaijan
- Səmədabad, Yevlakh, Azerbaijan
- Samadabad, Fars, Iran
- Samadabad, Gilan, Iran
- Samadabad, East Azerbaijan, Iran
- Samadabad, Razavi Khorasan, Iran
- Samadabad, South Khorasan, Iran
