= Abyss (play) =

Drama by Huseyn Javid

Abyss Azerbaijani: Uçurum
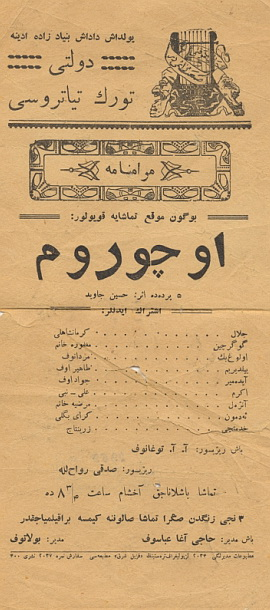
- The plays program. The State Turkic Theater named after D. Bunyatzade
- Written by: Huseyn Javid
- Original language: Azerbaijani
- Genre: Tragedy

Premiere
- Date premiered: 1922
- Place premiered: Azerbaijan State Academic Drama Theatre

"Abyss" (Azerbaijani: Uçurum), or "Uchurum" is a poetic drama, a tragedy in four acts written in 1917 by the Azerbaijani poet and playwright Huseyn Javid. The play was firstly published in 1926 in Baku by the Azerbaijan State Publishing House. It was then republished only in 1968 in the first volume of the "Selected Works" of the Huseyn Javid. The first production of the play took place in 1922. Thus, in the 1922/23 of the theatrical season, the play was staged in the State Turkic Theater named after Dadash Bunyatzade by the director Abbas Mirza Sharifzade.

This is one of H. Javids dramas, in which a special place is occupied by the people who face the injustice of the society and are left alone with their experiences. It was also believed that the play was marked by the pan-Turkic sentiments.

== See also ==
- Khayyam
- The Devil
- Sheikh Sanan
