= National Theatre Day in Azerbaijan =

National Theatre Day in Azerbaijan is celebrated on 10 March.

== History ==
National Theatre in Azerbaijan was created in the 1870s. On March 10, 1873, Baku real school performed the comedy "Adventure-vizier-khan Lankaran" by Mirza Fatali Akhundov. With this performance which was also organized by Hasan bey Zardabi and Najaf bey Vazirov, the national theatre was founded in Azerbaijan.

Theatre in Azerbaijan has ancient traditions such as folk performances, puppet theatre performances ("Maral game", "Kilimarki"), festive performances (Kos-Kosa), religious performances ("Shabih"), and others. While traveling to Azerbaijan in the second half of the XVII century, French traveler Jean Chardin was shown a three-part performance in Chukhursad Beylerbey's, where he was guest. This performance impressed Sharden, so he called it the "opera of the East."

Famous philanthropist Haji Zeynalabdin Taghiyev had important service in the development of the national theatre. He built the first theatre building in Baku. The Azerbaijan scene reared Jahangir bey Zeynalov, Huseynqulu Sarabski, Mirzaga Aliyev, Huseyn Arablinski, Ulvi Rajab, Abbas Mirza Sharifzadeh, Mustafa Mardanov, Mammadrza Sheykhzamanov, Aghasadik Garaybeyli, Aliagha Aghayev, Lutfali Abdullayev, Nasiba khanum Zeynalova, Marziya Mammadova.

As a result of the Azerbaijan Democratic Republic's assistance and intervention, the development of the Azerbaijani theatre has continued. One of the purposeful steps of the government in this area was the organization of the Azerbaijan State Theatre.

The scenes of this theatre were first opened on November 4, 1918, by the play of N.Narimanov's "Nadir Shah" tragedy. The 10th of March, the day of the foundation of the Azerbaijan national theatre is celebrated the Azerbaijan National Theatre Day.

== See also ==
- Theatre in Azerbaijan
- Azerbaijan State Academic National Drama Theatre
- Azerbaijan State Theatre of Young Spectators
