= Sidgi Ruhulla =

Azerbaijani-Soviet actor (1886–1959)

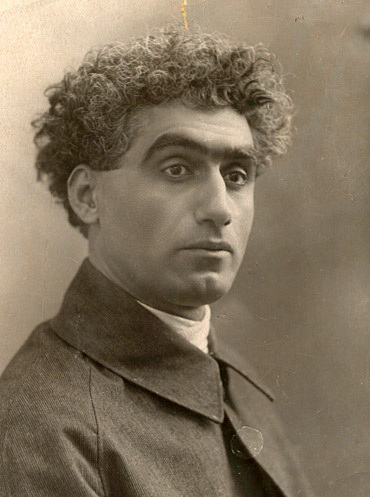
- Born: Ruhulla Akhundov; 9 April 1886; Buzovna, Baku uezd, Baku Governorate, Russian Empire
- Died: 5 May 1959 (aged 73); Baku, Azerbaijan SSR, Soviet Union
- Burial place: Alley of Honor
- Occupations: Actor, theater and opera director
- Years active: 1906–1959
- Awards: People's Artist of the Azerbaijan SSR Stalin Prize Honored Artist of the Azerbaijan SSR

Ruhulla Fatulla oghlu Axhundov (Azerbaijani: Ruhulla Fətulla oğlu Axundov, 9 April 1886 – 5 May 1959) was a Soviet and Azerbaijani actor and theater director. People's Artist of the USSR (1949).

== Biography ==
Ruhulla was born in Buzovna. In 1904, his father, Mullah Fatulla, died, and Ruhulla sold his father's household goods and went to Moscow to study with the money he had saved. However, due to financial difficulties, Ruhulla could not complete his education and returned to Baku.

After he played the role of Sidgi Bey very skillfully in Namık Kemal's play Vatan on 6 November 1910, he took the stage-name Sidgi and became known as Sidgi Ruhulla in the history of theatre.

Ruhulla died in Baku, and was buried in the Alley of Honor.

== Career ==
In the early 20th century, male actors played female roles on the Azerbaijani stage. This lasted until the 20s and 30s of the 20th century. Ruhulla's first role was Telli in the comedy He Has a Name, Not Himself by Najaf bey Vazirov, directed by Huseyn Arablinski and staged on 21 December 1908, in Balaxanı drama association. Ruhulla skillfully performed his first performance as Rustam bey in the tragedy Fakhraddin's Misfortune in the hall of Seamen's Club in Baku. After the performance, Abdurrahim bey Hagverdiyev, Najaf bey Vazirov, Hasan bey Zardabi and others congratulated Ruhulla.

Ruhulla went on to play the roles of Musa in the tragedy of Abdurrahim bey Hagverdiyev The Unlucky Young Man (directed by Huseyn Arablinski, on 4 May 1909, in Yerevan), Tahmas in the tragedy of Nariman Narimanov Nadir-shah (directed by H. Arablinski, 10 May 1909, Yerevan), Berezin in the work of Evgeny Chirikov The Jews (directed by H. Arablinski, 15 May 1909, Yerevan), Qatran Bey in the comedy of Molière Le Médecin malgré lui (directed by H. Arablinski, 20 May 1909, Yerevan), Nadir Shah in N. Narimanov's Nadir-shah tragedy (directed by M. Kazimovski, 8 December 1909, Baku), Fakhraddin in N. Vazirov's Fakhraddin's Misfortune tragedy (directed by M. Kazimovski, 11 December 1909, Baku).

From 1906 until 1920, Ruhulla performed in more than 250 cities and regions. He had visited Moscow, Saint Petersburg, Tabriz, Tehran, Rasht, Qazvin, Isfahan, Shiraz, Samarkand, Bukhara, Merv, Ashgabat, Kharkiv, Kyiv, Tula, Tbilisi, Yerevan, Krasnovodsk, Derbent, Makhachkala, Vladikavkaz, Grozny, Andijan, Ufa, Sarab, Ardabil, Anzali, Kazan, Batumi, Odesa, Rostov, Sukhumi, Yalta, Sevastopol, Simferopol, Tuapse, Sochi.

Ruhulla founded a professional theatre in Tabriz in 1909 with the help of local intellectuals. In 1919, the Department of Enlightenment of South Azerbaijan awarded Ruhulla a gold medal for his contributions to the establishment and development of theatrical culture in South Azerbaijan and Iran.

== Filmography ==
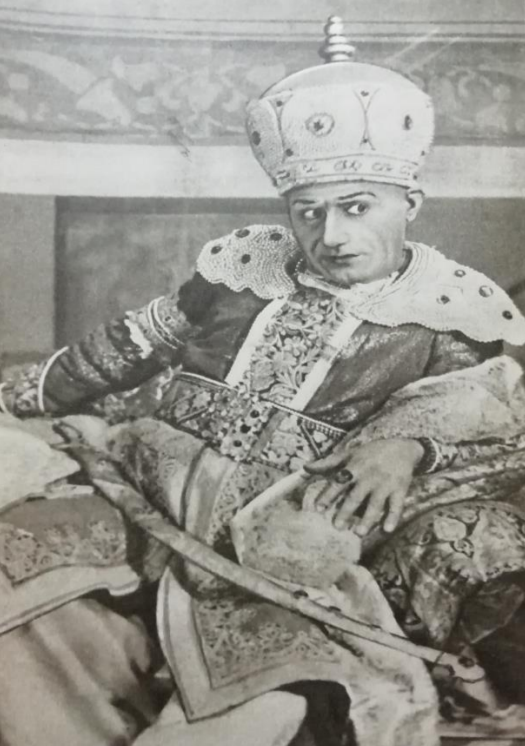
Ruhulla in the role of Agha Mohammad Shah Gajar in Vagif drama

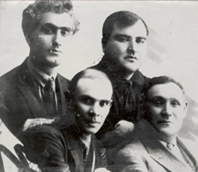
Ruhulla, Hajiagha Abbasov, Abbas Mirza Sharifzadeh and Mirzaagha Aliyev

- In the Name of God (1925)
- Gilanian Girl (1928)
- Haji Gara (1929)
- Golden Bush (1930)
- Peasants (1939)
- Fatali Khan (1947)

== Awards ==
- Honored Artist of the Azerbaijan SSR – 23 April 1931
- People's Artiste of the Azerbaijan SSR – 4 December 1938
- Stalin Prize (2nd degree) – 1948
- Order of the Red Banner of Labour – 22 July 1949
- People's Artist of the USSR – 22 July 1949
- Order of Lenin – 27 October 1956
- Medal "For Labour Valour"
- Medal "For the Defence of the Caucasus"
