= Ramiz Novruz =

Azerbaijani actor (1955–2023)

- Born: 25 May 1955; Samadabad, Pushkin District, Azerbaijan SSR, USSR
- Died: 21 February 2023 (aged 67); Baku, Azerbaijan
- Education: Azerbaijan State University of Culture and Arts
- Occupation: Actor
- Awards: Honored Artist of Azerbaijan

Ramiz Gavvam oghlu Novruzov (Azerbaijani: Ramiz Qəvvam oğlu Novruzov, 25 May 1955 – 21 February 2023) was a theater and film actor from Azerbaijan, People's Artiste of Azerbaijan (1998), Presidential scholarship holder (from 2018), leading stage master of Azerbaijan State Academic National Drama Theatre.

== Biography ==
Ramiz Novruz was born on 25 May 1955, in the Samadabad village of Bilasuvar District. In 1974, he entered the Faculty of Drama and Film Acting of the Azerbaijan State University of Culture and Arts. He graduated from the course led by film director Adil Isgandarov in 1978. By appointment, he was sent to the Sumgayit State Musical Drama Theater. He joined the troupe of Azerbaijan State Academic National Drama Theatre in 1981.

Ramiz Novruz also wrote several plays, two of which were staged. The play "They Haven't Said I Love You Yet" written in 1996, was staged at the Azerbaijan State Academic National Drama Theater in 2002 under the direction of B. Osmanov. In addition, he translated Eduardo De Filippo's Cilindro from Russian into Azerbaijani and staged it as a director, and also played the role of Atilio in this work.

He was a laureate of international theater festivals.

Novruz suffered from stomach cancer for a long time and died on 20 February 2023.

== Awards ==
- Honored Artist of Azerbaijan — 1993
- People's Artiste of Azerbaijan — 1998
- Honorary Diploma of President of Azerbaijan — 29 October 2019
