= Grief of Fakhreddin =

1896 tragedy written by Najaf bey Vezirov

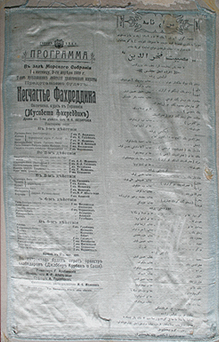
- The tragedy's program on silk with the participation of Huseyn Arablinski. Azerbaijan State Theatre Museum in Baku
- Original title: Azerbaijani: موصیبت فخرالدین
- Written by: Najaf bey Vazirov
- Original language: Azerbaijani
- Genre: Tragedy

Premiere
- Date premiered: 1902

Grief of Fakhreddin (Azerbaijani: موصیبت فخرالدین, Müsibəti-Fəxrəddin) is a tragedy written by the Azerbaijani playwright Najaf bey Vezirov in 1896. This is the first tragedy in the Azerbaijani drama. In this work, the image of a young liberal nobleman, fighting against the patriarchal order, for the transformation of the landlord economy is created.

== History ==
In 1902, for the first time in Baku, a collection of Najaf-bey Vezirovs was published, which included five of his plays, among which was the Grief of Fakhreddin. The rest of the plays were: Heroes of the Present, The Invisible Man, Out of the Rain and Under the Downpour and A Picture of Home Education. In the same year, the tragedy was staged under Vezirovs personal guidance and with the participation of such artists as Huseyn Arablinski and Huseyngulu Sarabski.

In November 1916, with the participation of Mirzaagha Aliyev, the play was again prepared for staging. At the request of the directors, Vezirov came every day, followed the progress of the rehearsals and gave the necessary instructions. But there was not an actress who would play the role of Uris grandmother (Urinana). And when Mirzaagha Aliyev asked Vezirov why he introduces so many women into his plays, since there is no female character on the Azerbaijani stage, Vezirov replied that “we, Azerbaijani playwrights, when writing plays mean not only the modern stage of our life and our today's environment. The time will come when science and culture will step so far that there will be much more women on the stage than men". Finally, on 22 November 1916, the play was staged. And the role of Uris grandmother, wearing a woman's dress and hiding his moustache and beard under a kerchief, was played by Najaf-bey Vezirov himself. Mirzaagha Aliyev recalled that Vezirov “coped with this role and successfully completed it”

== See also ==
- Khayyam
- The Devil
- Sheikh Sanan
