= House-Museum and Memorial Complex of Huseyn Javid =

- Azerbaijani: Hüseyn Cavidin ev-muzeyi və Xatirə Kompleksi
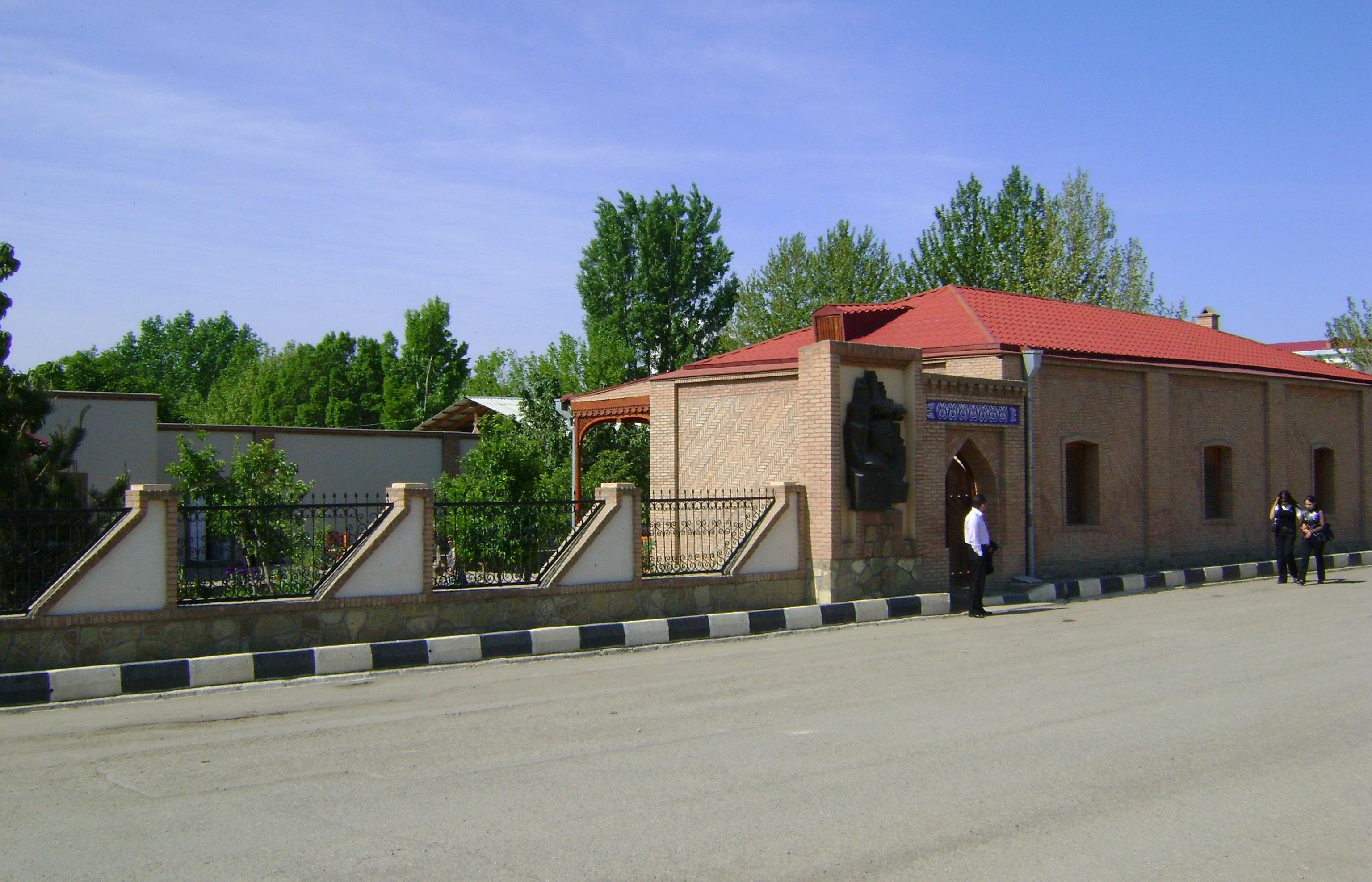

- Location within Azerbaijan
- Established: July 21, 1981; 44 years ago
- Location: Nakhchivan, Nakhchivan Autonomous Republic, Azerbaijan
- Coordinates: 39.215150°N 45.412732°E
- Type: Literature
- Director: Bahruz Akhundov

The house-museum and memorial complex of Huseyn Javid (Azerbaijani: Hüseyn Cavidin ev-muzeyi və xatirə kompleksi) is a memorial museum dedicated to the Azerbaijani poet and playwright, Huseyn Javid. It is located near Mausoleum of Huseyn Javid in the capital of Nakhchivan Autonomous Republic, the city of Nakhchivan.

== History ==
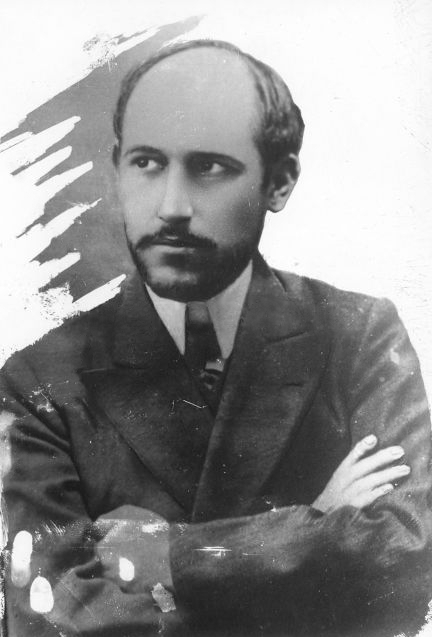
Huseyn Javid

In memory of Huseyn Javid, a prominent figure in literature of Azerbaijan, the museum was established on the decision of Government of Azerbaijan, on July 21, 1981, named "On 100th anniversary of Huseyn Javid". On June 9, 1984, the opening ceremony of the museum took place. Turan Javid, daughter of the poet took an active part in the creation of the museum. For a long time, the museum operated under the name of "House-Museum of Husyn Javid". In 2015 the museum was renamed to "House-Museum and Memorial Complex of Huseyn Javid".

== Exhibition ==
More than 9200 exhibits have been collected in the museum fund. Among them, there are photographs reflecting the life and creativity of Huseyn Javid, first editions of his works, The Devil, published in 1926 and signed by the author, rare copies of "Sayavush" which was published in 1934, posters and programs of anniversaries of prominent artists, dramas put on theater, various memorial and household items.

Manuscript of the book "Knyaz" donated by poet's daughter, Turan Javid, a book consist of letters, are also exhibited in the museum. Documents related to Nakhchivan period of Huseyn Javid's life, most of the precious items displayed at the museum's exposition are also donated by Turan Javid.

The museum also includes the books donated by Mammad Jafar Jafarov, Abbas Zamanov, Mehdi Mammadov, Yashar Garayev, Rafael Huseynov, Yavuz Akhundlu, Isa Habibbeyli, Zahid Akbarov, Ajdar Ismayilov, Huseyn Hashimli and others.

== Research and activity ==
At the same time, the museum also deals with the research of Huseyn Javid's creativity. Catalogs of Huseyn Javid's works, reflecting the stage and publication dates, organizations, institutions and settlements associated with his name, have been compiled. Mobile exhibitions on topics of “Huseyn Javid and theater”, “Huseyn Javid and Nakhchivan Theater”, “Huseyn Javid's dramatic composition”, “Huseyn Javid's life and creativity” were established and demonstrated in the cultural and educational institutions of Nakhchivan AR, the exhibition "Huseyn Javid and theater" was exhibited in Minsk.

The museum staff holds lectures on life and creativity of Huseyn Javid and promotes his literary heritage. The "Huseyn Javid poetry club", which is organized in the museum, organizes meetings and discussions with various creative collectives, Javid scholars, poets and writers.

== See also ==
- ANAS House-Museum of Huseyn Javid
