= Culture of the Azerbaijan Democratic Republic =

Culture of the Azerbaijan Democratic Republic is the official culture of ADR that existed in 1918–1920.

== Press ==
During the two years of the ADR's existence, about 100 titles of newspapers and magazines were published in the country. The press of this period can be grouped as follows:

1. National press promoting the ideas of the Azerbaijan Democratic Republic,
2. Bolshevik press (oppositional),
3. Socialist-revolutionary and menshevik press,
4. Independent informative newspapers and magazines.

Examples of the national press that can be cited include such magazines and newspapers as "Istiglal" (1918–20), "Azerbaijan" (1918–20), "Ravines-Nafisi" (1919), "Gurtulush" (1920), "Madaniyyat" (1920), "Sheypur" (1918–19), "Zanbur" (1919), etc.

Press in Baku, Ganja, Shusha, Tiflis and other cultural and administrative centers was published not only in Azerbaijani-Turkish, but also in Russian, Georgian, Polish, Farsi, Deutsch and other languages.

== Education ==
Ministry of Public Education was headed by Nasib bey Yusifbeyli. There was a Department of Archeology functioning under the Ministry.

On August 28, 1918, the schools were nationalized. Along with schools, men's and women's gymnasiums were opened. In order to train qualified personnel, special pedagogical courses have been opened in Baku, Ganja, Gazakh, Shusha, Nuha, and Guba. There was a commission for the preparation of textbooks in the Azerbaijani language.

In 1919, a special commission on alphabet reform was organized under the leadership of H. Melik-Aslanov.

The Azerbaijani branch of the Transcaucasian Teachers Seminary in Gori was moved to Gazakh. In 1919, Baku University (now Baku State University) was opened.

Such societies as "Turk Ojagi", "Society for the Study of the Muslim East", the National Library, the National Museum "Istiglal", etc. were established.

== Literature ==
The development of the literature of this period was strongly influenced by such intellectuals as Mahammad Amin Rasulzadeh, Alimardan bey Topchubashev, Mirzabala Mammadzadeh, Ahmad bey Agayev, Ali bey Huseynzadeh, Huseyn Javid, Jalil Mammadkulizadeh, Muhammad Hadi, Ahmad Javad, Abdullah Shaig, Salman Mumtaz, Aliabbas Muznib and others.

== Theater ==
Important changes took place in the development of the Azerbaijani theater too. Conditions for the reorganization of theater companies emerged in Baku. The first theater group during this period was “the Hajibeyli Brothers”. The members of the group were Hajiagha Abbasov, Mirzagha Aliyev, Ahmad Aghdamsky, Jalil Baghdadbekov, Huseyn Arablinsky, Huseyngulu Sarabsky, Mukhtar Mahometzade, Rza Darably, Sidgi Ruhulla, Alekper Huseynzadeh, Mammadtagi Bagirzadeh, Baghira Kazimovsky, etc.

Branches of the theater department of the Hajibeyli brothers operated in Shusha and Nakhichevan.

According to the Decree dated October 9, 1918, the management of theater was transferred to the Ministry of Public Education. On October 18, it was decided to purchase the building of the Mailov Brothers Theater (now the Azerbaijan State Academic Opera and Ballet Theater) for the State Theater.

On November 4, 1918, Nariman Narimanov's tragedy "Nader Shah" was staged.

On November 17, 1919, the Azerbaijani theater was nationalized and placed under the auspices of the state.

== Music ==
The first Azerbaijani operas were staged at the State Theater.

In 1919, Uzeyir Hajibeyov wrote a number of choreographic works: "Dagestan "("Gaitagi"), "Azerbaijan", etc. He also wrote the "Anthem of Azerbaijan".

Such folk singers and ashugs as Jabbar Garyagdiogly, Kechachi Muhammad, Seyid Shushinsky, Majid Beibutov and others played an important role in the development of Azerbaijani music.

== Visual art ==
Since the proclamation of the Azerbaijan Democratic Republic, state symbols were created. On November 9, 1918, the Government of the Republic adopted a resolution "On the approval of the Flag".

On March 23, 1919, the government decided to announce a competition for the development of projects for the state emblem, military orders and et cetera.

The sculptor Zeynal Alizadeh took part in the development of the state emblem, orders and medals. On the chest and commemorative medals issued according to his project, the parliament building, flags, a crescent moon, an eight-pointed star, a sunrise, and wreaths of roses were engraved.

Cartoons of the artist Azim Azimzadeh were published in "Zanbur".

The first painting studio was created in 1919. Artist Bahruz Kengerli organized a gallery of images of refugees.

== Architecture ==
It was planned to open a sculpture class at the Baku Technical School. Burned by the Armenian-Dashnak forces in March 1918, the school for girls and "Ismailia" building were restored according to projects of Zivar bey Akhmedbeyov, who served as the chief architect of Baku. On his initiative, a new Shirvan society was established to restore the destroyed city of Shamakhi. A Society of Lovers and Guardians of Islamic Art was also established. Architects Zivar bey Akhmedbeyov, Nabioglu Gajar, engineers Mammad Hasan Hajinsky and Haji Bey Akhundov studied the complex of the Shirvanshahs' Palace.

On January 1, 1920, at a meeting of the Union of Turkish Actors, it was decided to erect a monument on the grave of Huseyn Arablinsky, one of the founders of the national theater art. It was supposed to erect monuments to the martyrs who died during the battle of Baku in September 1918. The Ministry of Public Education allocated 500 thousand manats for the construction of the Nizami Ganjavi Mausoleum in Ganja.

According to decree of the Parliament dated September 1, 1919, more than 100 Azerbaijanis were sent to study at universities in Europe.

== See also ==
Azerbaijan Democratic Republic
