= Khayyam (play) =

Play by Huseyn Javid

Khayyam Azerbaijani: Xəyyam
- Written by: Huseyn Javid
- Original language: Azerbaijani
- Genre: Tragedy

Premiere
- Date premiered: 1970
- Place premiered: Azerbaijan State Academic Drama Theatre

"Khayyam" (Azerbaijani: Xəyyam) is a tragedy written by the Azerbaijani playwright Huseyn Javid, in 1935. It was dedicated to the famous poet and thinker Omar Khayyam, and was firstly published in 1963 in Baku. It was staged in March 1970 at the Azerbaijan Drama Theatre in Baku.

== Play’s history ==
Huseyn Javid wrote the play "Khayyam" in 1935. In the same year, it was awarded the 3rd place in the competition of literary works of the Azerbaijan SSR.

Huseyn Javid once sent the play to his friend who lived in Yerevan. After a long time, in 1957, his daughter, Turan Javid, managed to find it in Yerevan and bring it to Baku.

The play was firstly published in 1963 by the Azerneshr publishing house in Baku.

On 12 March 1970, the play was staged in the Azerbaijan State Academic Drama Theatre named after M. Azizbekov by the Peoples Artist of the USSR, the Professor Mekhti Mammadov. The decoration of the performance and sketches were prepared by the artist Elchin Mammadov, and the music was written by the Peoples Artist of the Azerbaijan SSR, the laureate of the USSR State Prize - Jahangir Jahangirov. The roles were played by Mekhti Mamadov, Shafiga Mamedova, Hasanagha Turabov, Mamedrza Sheikhzamanov, Ismayil Osmanli, and others.

== See also ==
- Siyavush
- The Devil
- Sheikh Sanan
