= Firangiz Sharifova =

Azerbaijani actress

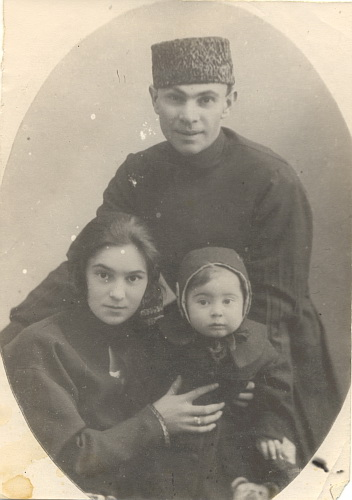
- from Azerbaijan State Theater Museum
- Born: Firangiz Abbasmirza gizi Sharifova; 6 February 1924; Baku, Azerbaijan
- Died: 20 February 2014 (aged 90); Baku, Azerbaijan
- Occupation: actress
- Awards: People’s Artist of Azerbaijan (1969), Shohrat Order (2009)

Firangiz Abbasmirza gizi Sharifova (Azerbaijani: Firəngiz Abbasmirzə qızı Şərifova; 6 February 1924, Baku – 20 February 2014, Baku) was an Azerbaijani theater and film actress, singer, People's Artist of the Azerbaijan SSR (1969). She is best known for her roles in the films The Most Important Interview (1971), Legend of Silver Lake (1984), and Day of Execution (1990).

== Life ==
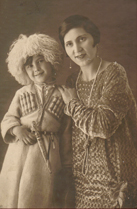
Firangiz Shafirova with her mother Marziyya Davudova

Firangiz Sharifova was born on 6 February 1924 in Baku in the family of the leading figures of the national theater Abbas Mirza Sharifzadeh and Marziyya Davudova. Her father was unjustly arrested in 1937 and shot as an enemy of the people. He was acquitted posthumously in 1956. At the age of six, Sharifova's father took her on stage as the sister of his character Sevyar in the play "Oktay Elolu". At the age of eight, she played Gunduz in “Sevil”. The same year, she entered the first grade of the high school and started to study in Russian.

Sharifova studied at the Baku Choreographic School where she made her first steps in the performances in concerts. In 1941, on the advice of Uzeyir bey Hajibeyov, a close friend and benefactor of her family, she entered the vocal faculty of the Azerbaijan State Conservatory (now the Academy of Music). Sharifova studied at the conservatory for five years and managed to develop the soprano's voice professionally.

== Career ==
In early 1947, Sharifova was admitted to the troupe of the Azerbaijan State Theater of Musical Comedy named after Jalil Mammadguluzadeh (now the State Musical Theater), but two years later the theater was temporarily closed. In 1949, Sharifova began working as an actor in the troupe of the Azerbaijan State Theatre of Young Spectators and soon became one of the main actors in the theater's repertoire. Sharifova remained at the Theatre of Young Spectators until 1961, when she was employed by the Academic National Drama Theater.

In 1965, Sharifova returned to the Young Spectators Theatre and worked there until 2011. In 1958, Firangiz Sharifova was awarded the title of Honored Artist, in 1969 – People's Artist of Azerbaijan, in 2009, she was awarded the Order of Glory.

During her creative life, Sharifova embodied many vivid theatrical images. She performed roles in such productions as "What do you live for?", "Mahmud and Maryam", "White Camel" and many others. Sharifova starred in the films "Country house for one family", "An owl flew in", "The Legend of the Silver Lake", "Leaf fall in the summer season", "Most important interview", "Long Life Chords", "Day of Execution", etc.

Firangiz Sharifova died on 20 February 2014 in Baku at the age of 90.

Sharifova's grandson Eldar Gasimov won the Eurovision Song Contest 2011.
