= Samanabad (disambiguation) =

Samanabad (Urdu: and Persian: سمن آباد) can refer to:

- Samanabad is a suburb of Lahore, Punjab, Pakistan
- Samanabad Town is an administrative town (tehsil) of Lahore, Punjab, Pakistan
- Samanabad (Karachi) is a suburb of Gulberg Town in Karachi, Sindh, Pakistan
- Samanabad, Iran, a village in South Khorasan Province, Iran
