= Topal Teymur (play) =

Historic drama by Huseyn Javid

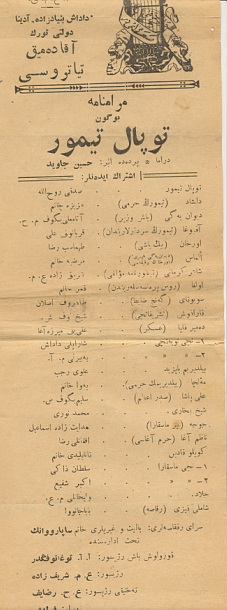
- Poster of the spectacle. 1926. Azerbaijan State Academic Drama Theatre
- Original language: Azerbaijani
- Written by: Huseyn Javid
- Genre: Drama
- Setting: 1925

Premiere
- Date: 1926
- Place: Azerbaijan State Academic Drama Theatre

Topal Teymur – is a play, historic drama in five acts written by Huseyn Javid, an Azerbaijani poet and playwright, in 1925. Topal Teymur is a 1926 play about Timur, the Central Asian conqueror. It premiered in 1926 in Baku.

It was considered that the poet idealized feudal conquerors and that “Timur was idealized with his ideas of consolidation of Turkic, Tatar, and Mongolian peoples under the flag of integrated Turan Empire.” Some people said that there is a detachment toward modernity in the play and some found out nationalistic motifs.
