= Marziyya Davudova =

Azerbaijani actress

- Mərziyyə Davudova
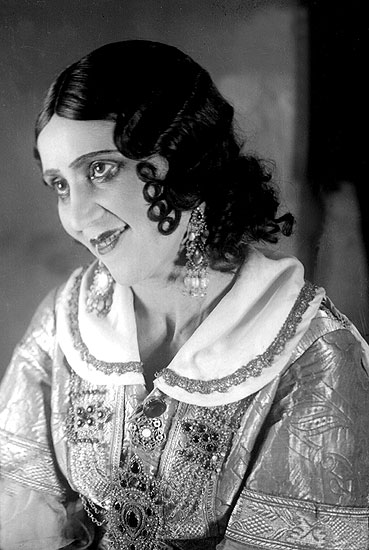
- Born: December 8, 1901; Astrakhan, Russian Empire
- Died: January 6, 1962 (aged 60); Baku, Azerbaijan SSR, Soviet Union
- Occupation: Actress

Marziyya Yusuf gizi Davudova (Note: Azerbaijani: Mərziyyə Yusif qızı Davudova; Tatar: Мәрзия Йосыф кызы Давытова-Әдһәмова, romanized: Mărzii͡a Ǐosyf kyzy Davytova-Ădḣămova; Russian: Марзия Юсуф кызы Давудова, romanized: Marziya Yusuf kyzy Davudova) (8 December 1901 – 6 January 1962) was a Soviet Azerbaijani, Astrakhan Tatar actress who starred in theatre and silent film. She was awarded the People's Artist of the USSR (1949).

== Early life and career ==
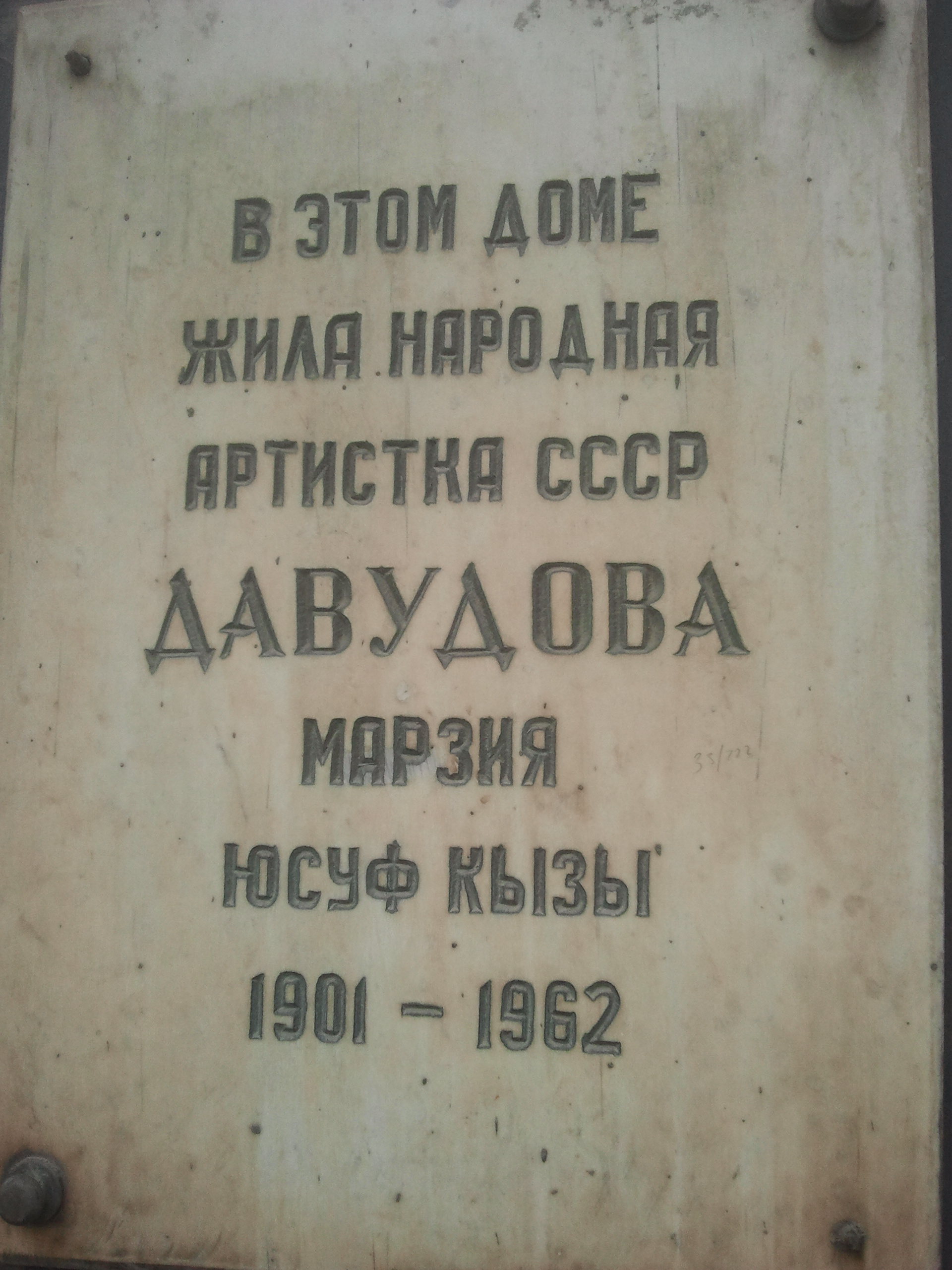
Plaque on building where Azerbaijani actress Marziyya Davudova lived in Baku

Marziyya Davudova was born on 8 December 1901 in Astrakhan, Russian Empire (now Russia), into a family of Astrakhan Tatar origins. She graduated from the Jamiyyat-i Kheyriyya Islamiyya school. In 1917, she debuted as an actress at the local Astrakhan Tatar Drama Theatre.

In 1918, her talent was noticed by Azerbaijani actor Huseyn Arablinski who was visiting Astrakhan at the time. After the play and a short interview, Arablinski invited Davudova to pursue an acting career in Baku. In 1920, she settled in Baku, Azerbaijan and joined the Arablinski theatre troupe, acting at the Azerbaijan State Academic National Drama Theatre.

Many of her early roles portrayed the government-propagated heroic and independent image of the new-era Soviet woman, as seen in Sevil by Jafar Jabbarly, Hayat by Mirza Ibrahimov, Lyubov Yarovaya by Konstantin Trenyov, etc.

== Later life and death ==
Throughout her career, she also starred in films such as Bakhtiyar, Haji Gara, Bir aila, Bakinin ishiglari, Bir mahallali iki oghlan, Koroghlu, Asl dost, etc. Her last role was that of the Mother in a theatre play based on Alexis Parnis's Aphrodite's Island in 1961.

She was awarded the following awards: the Honored Artist of the Azerbaijan SSR (1933); the People's Artiste of the Azerbaijan SSR (1936); the People's Artist of the USSR (1949); and Stalin Prize (or USSR State Prize) of the second degree (1948) for her role in the play "Morning of the East" by E. G. Mammadkhanli.

Davudova died on 6 January 1962 in Baku, aged 60, after a long struggle with cancer.

== Personal life ==
Marziyya Davudova was the partner of actor and director Abbas Mirza Sharifzadeh, who was executed by a Soviet Union firing squad for his political activities and connections. She was the mother of actress Firangiz Sharifova, and great-grandmother of Eurovision Song Contest 2011 winner Eldar Gasimov.

== See also ==
- List of People's Artistes of the Azerbaijan SSR
