= Ulvi Rajab =

Azerbaijani actor (1903–1938)

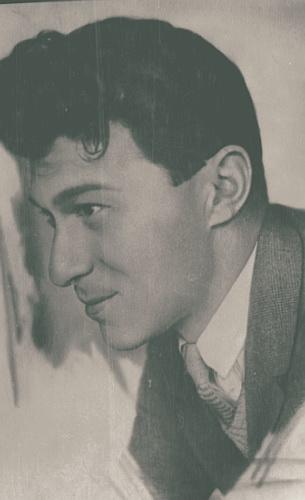
- Born: Ulvi Rajab Molla oghlu Shashygzade; 1903; Janivri, Batum Oblast, Russian Empire
- Died: 2 January 1938 (aged 34–35); Baku, Azerbaijan SSR, USSR

Ulvi Rajab (Azerbaijani: Ülvi Rəcəb; 1903, Janivri, near Batumi – 2 January 1938, Baku) was an Azerbaijani stage actor.

== Life and career ==
He was born Ulvi Shashikadze (Georgian: ულვი შაშიკაძე) in the village of Janivri (presently in Adjara, Georgia) to a Muslim Georgian family. His stage name Rajab derived from his father's first name. He lost his father at an early age. He received primary education in Istanbul where he went with his aunt, but dropped out following the beginning of World War I and began making a living. In 1918, he returned to Batumi where he attended the play Othello staged by an Azerbaijani theatre troupe led by Huseyn Arablinski at the local Actors' Society. He decided to join the troupe but appeared in minor roles until 1922, when he replaced an absent actor as Soltan bey in The Cloth Peddler and was recognized for his talent. Following the political turmoil of the early 1920s, Rajab began working as an actor at the Azerbaijani State Drama Theatre in Tiflis, Georgia. In 1925, the theatre's stage director Alexander Tuganov was invited to work for the Azerbaijan State Academic Drama Theatre in Baku, Azerbaijan. Tuganov accepted the invitation and offered the young and promising Rajab a position in the theatre. Rajab worked at the Drama Theatre in Baku as an actor for the rest of his life. In 1933, he was awarded the title of Honorary Artist of Azerbaijan. Critics described Rajab's performances as one where "realistic depth is combined with romantic emotion".

Rajab's repertoire consisted of roles in various genres, including heroic (Siyavush in Siyavush by Huseyn Javid, Mikhail Yarovoy in Enemies by Konstantin Trenyov, etc.), tragic (Hamlet in Hamlet and Othello in Othello by William Shakespeare, Elkhan in The Fire Bride by Jafar Jabbarly, etc.), romantic (Romeo in Romeo and Juliet by William Shakespeare and Sheikh Sanan in Sheikh Sanan by Uzeyir Hajibeyov), and dramatic (Borodin in Fear by Alexander Afinogenov, Satin in The Lower Depths by Maxim Gorky, etc.)

In 1937, in the midst of Great purge in the Soviet Union he was arrested, charged with "counter-revolutionary activity". Reportedly the accusation stemmed from Rajab owning a collection of records of Turkish folk music. He was found guilty by the Military Board of the Supreme Court of the Soviet Union and executed by firing squad on 2 January 1938. On 7 December 1955, the sentence was revoked and Rajab was posthumously exonerated.

His nephew Nodar Shashygoghlu was an acclaimed Azerbaijani actor.
