= Govhar Gaziyeva =

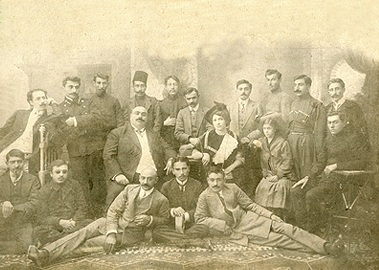

Govhar Ahmad qizi Gaziyeva (Azerbaijani: Gövhər Qazıyeva; 1887, Tiflis, Russian Empire – 1960, Azerbaijan Province, Iran) was an Azerbaijani stage actress who performed under the alias Goyarchin (Azeri for "dove"). Debuting in 1910, she is considered the first Azerbaijani and the first Muslim woman in the world to appear on stage.

== Early life and acting career ==
Govhar Gaziyeva was born in Tiflis (present-day capital of Georgia) to a family of intellectuals. She graduated from the Institute of Noble Maidens, where she had received education in Russian. According to theatre historian Adila Ismayilova, she was homeschooled by a foster Russian family where her father had placed her. Gaziyeva married at an early age and moved with her husband to Central Russia. Her eldest son Ismayil was born in Voronezh in 1906. A year later, she left her husband and moved back to Tiflis with her child.

At the turn of the twentieth century, Tiflis was an important center of cultural development for various peoples of the Caucasus, including for Azeris. Amateur Azeri actors established numerous theatrical troupes, the largest ones being Dram Cəmiyyəti and Səadət which Govhar Gaziyeva joined in 1906, playing minor roles. Her first major performance was that in Najaf bey Vazirov's play Fəxrəddin Faciəsi which was staged on 9 October 1910 at the Georgian Nobility Theatre. In the next few years, she acted in over ten different roles in both Azeri and foreign plays in Tiflis, Baku, Erivan, and Nakhchivan including the role of Gulnaz in Uzeyir Hajibeyov's operetta If Not That One, Then This One. She continued acting despite the fact that the appearance of a Muslim woman unveiled on stage remained a topic of controversy.

Gaziyeva performed alongside Huseyngulu Sarabski, Huseyn Arablinski and most notably Mirzaagha Aliyev, whom she married in 1912. Following their wedding, Aliyev insisted that Govhar Gaziyeva put an end to her career as an actress, and in the same year, the couple moved to Baku permanently.

== Later years ==
For his involvement in anti-Czarist activities, Aliyev was arrested and exiled to Astrakhan in 1913. Being estranged from each other, the couple decided to divorce. No longer an actress, Gaziyeva left Baku for Warsaw where she entered a medical program at St. Sophia Hospital and returned to Baku in 1915 as a licensed midwife. In the 1920s Gaziyeva left Azerbaijan and emigrated to Iran with her third husband, where she lived for the rest of her life. Photographs depicting her acting career are currently displayed at the Azerbaijan State Theatre Museum.
