= In the Name of God (1925 film) =

Bismillah
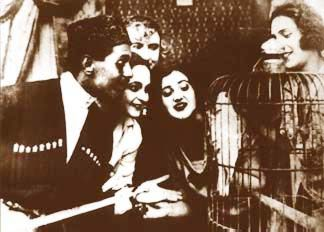
- The actors from film "Bismillah"
- Azerbaijani: Bismillah; Russian: Бисмиллах
- Directed by: Abbas Mirza Sharifzadeh
- Written by: Pavel Blyakhin
- Starring: Mirza Aga Aliyev, Mustafa Mardanov, Kazim Ziya, Mohsun Sanani,
- Production company: Baku Film Studio by the State Film Factory
- Release dates: November 17, 1925 (Soviet Union and Azerbaijan Soviet Socialist Republic)
- Running time: 57 minutes
- Countries: Azerbaijan SSR, Soviet Union
- Language: silent film (Russian credits)

Bismillah (Azerbaijani: Bismillah, lit. 'In the Name of God'; Russian: Бисмиллах) is a 1925 Soviet Azerbaijani propaganda film, the first film by the Azerbaijani director Abbas-Mirza Sharifzade, it is a silent film drama (Russian subtitles) about religious fanaticism and with an anti-Islamic theme. The movie was shot at a time when there was a fight against the Islamic religion in the country. The film was considered a significant success of Azerbaijani cinematography, and starred a nearly all-Azerbaijani cast.

== Plot summary ==
The film takes place before the October Revolution (1917) in Azerbaijan. A poor peasant (who is named Kuli or Gulu), is a Shia Muslim that has boundless faith in god. The peasant's brother is an oil worker and brings his friend Jafar with him to their village to lead revolutionary agitation through underground meetings. The peasant attends one of his brother's meetings, which had raised religious doubts within him.

The peasant doesn't know what to do with his feelings of doubt and decides to speak with the Mullah, an Islamic religious leader. The Mullah was able to find out from him the names of the participants in the underground meeting from speaking with the peasant. A wave of arrests swept through the village, and among those arrested was the peasant. Once a Revolution takes place and the Bolsheviks arrive, the peasant is empowered and realizes the deception on the part of the Mullah. He decides to take the Mullah to the newly established "People's Court" where he finds justice.

== History ==
On 22 April 1925, the newspaper Bakinsky Rabochiy wrote that the shooting of the film Bismillah based to the script of Pavel Blyakhin, and entrusted to Sharifzade. The newspaper Kommunist on 27 April, wrote that it, “was filmed with the participation of the Turkic (i.e., Azerbaijani) actors”. On 1 June of the same year, a film studio was opened at the State Film Factory, the director's part of which was headed by Abbas Mirza Sharifzade. Ajdar Nejad, on 31 May 1925 in the newspaper Kommunist, wrote that the movie In the Name of God, which stopped a year before for some reason, had been filming for a month already under the administration of Sharifzade, and that it would be presented no later than 25 July in the honour of Muharram.

On 13 July, the film Bismillah was shown to students, artists and invited spectators. On 24 July, the Berlin cinematographers returning from Iran, being in the photo-cinematography department of Azerbaijan, wished to send the film, along with a number of others, to Berlin. "Sovkino" ordered 12 copies of the film. In October, the film was shown in Moscow too. In Kharkov, 4 copies of this movie were also ordered for Ukraine. Asad Tahir wrote that such Western films as “Muslim Woman”, “Istanbul Beggar”, “The Thief of Bagdad” cannot compete with the film “Bismillah” in terms of the oriental themes presentation, since this movie itself “was filmed in the East, by an "Oriental production", with eastern actors. Aziz Sharif wrote that by shooting the film “Bismillah”, Abbas-Mirza Sharifzade proved that he is a gifted director. The Soviet government actively used this film as anti-Islamic propaganda.

The screenplay writer Pavel Blyakhin continued his anti-religious theme with his film "Judas" (1930) (Russian: Иуда, romanized: Iuda). A related film in this genre is titled, "From Under the Arches of the Mosque" (1928) (Azerbaijani: Iz-pod svodov mecheti; Russian: Из-под сводов мечети) by director Kazimir Gertel (Russian: Казимир Гертель), and stars actor Kamil Yarmatov.

After Sharifzade was executed in 1938, his name was cut from the credits of all the films he shot.

== Cast ==
- Mustafa Märdanov, a hired servant
- Ibrahim Azeri, as Jafar
- Mirzaagha Aliyev, as Mullah
- Kazım Ziya, as Mullah
- Mohsun Sanani
- Mirmahmud Kazimovski

== Literature ==
- Mămmădli, Gulam (1985). Abbas Mirzə Şərifzadə [Abbas Mirza Sharifzadeh (collection of documents telling about life, creativity and work)] (in Azerbaijani). Baku: İshig. p. 242.
