= ANAS House-Museum of Huseyn Javid =

- Azerbaijani: AMEA Hüseyn Cavidin Ev Muzeyi
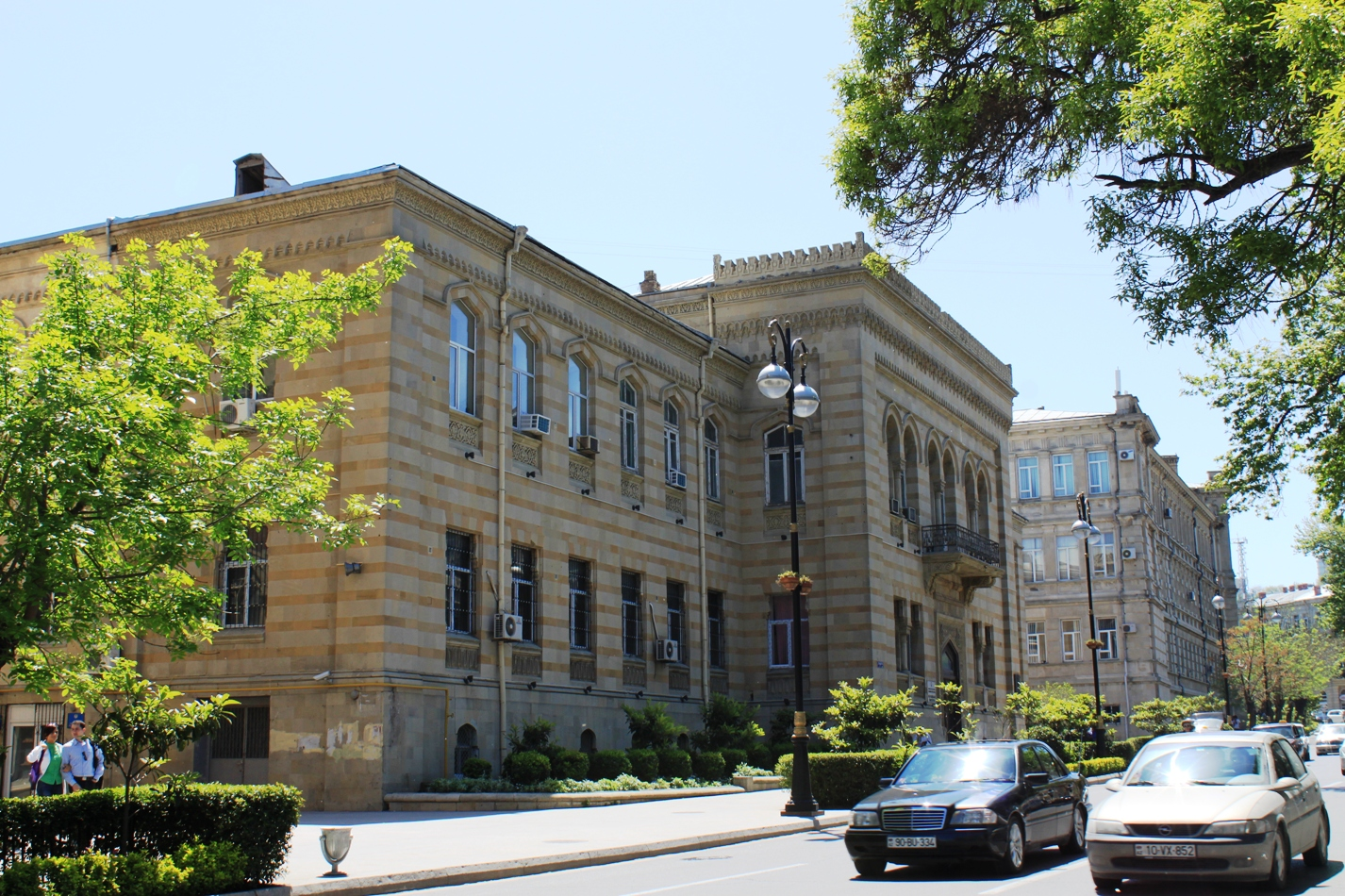

- Location within Azerbaijan
- Established: July 21, 1981; 44 years ago
- Location: Baku, Azerbaijan
- Coordinates: 40.368261°N 49.833100°E
- Director: Gulbaniz Babakhanli
- Website: huseyncavid.az

Huseyn Javid's House Museum is a scientific research institute incorporated into the Science Department of the Azerbaijan National Academy of Sciences (ANAS). The museum was created at the house where Azerbaijani poet and playwright Huseyn Javid lived during 1920–1937.

== History ==
The home museum was created with the aim of perpetuating and promoting the life and activity of the philosopher, playwright Huseyn Javid under the leadership of Heydar Aliyev. The opening of this museum was considered according to the decree “On 100th Anniversary of Huseyn Javid" by the Central Committee of the Communist Party of Azerbaijan on July 21, 1981. According to the decision of the Cabinet of Ministers of the Republic of Azerbaijan No. 160 dated July 10, 1995, Huseyn Javid's House Museum was created and subordinated to the Azerbaijan Academy of Sciences.

== Exhibits ==
The sections of the museum include "Cavid Studies", "Scientific Massive Studies", "Scientific Funds", "Scientific and Artistic Design", "Scientific Exposition", "Scientific Information and Library" are engaged in scientific research in the field of collection, protection, research and propagation of heritage of Huseyn Javid.

The museum consists of four rooms with a total area of 245 m^{2}.

There are around 4,000 exhibits in the main part of the museum, and 200 exhibits in the scientific part.

More than 600 exhibits, including household items and clothing items, books published by Huseyn Javid, programs and banners of stage works, performances and family photographs, model of the mausoleum of Huseyn Javid in Nakhchivan, painting devoted to poet, and other fine art works, his son Ertughrul Javid's compositions include note manuscripts, books used, paintings, pontoon shafts, letters and other documents were displayed.

== See also ==
- House-Museum and Memorial Complex of Huseyn Javid
