= Xəsədərli =

- Location within Azerbaijan
- Coordinates: 40°42′06″N 46°41′20″E
- Country: Azerbaijan
- Rayon: Goranboy
- Municipality: Səmədabad
- Time zone: UTC+4 (AZT)
  - Summer (DST): UTC+5 (AZT)

Xəsədərli (also, Xasadarlı and Khasadarly) is a village in the Goranboy Rayon of Azerbaijan. The village forms part of the municipality of Səmədabad.
