= Siyavush (play) =

Legendary-historic play by Azerbaijani poet Huseyn Javid

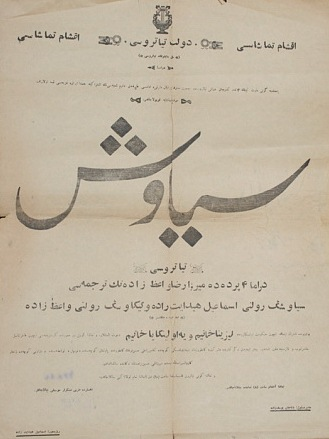
- Poster of the spectacle. Azerbaijan State Academic Drama Theatre
- Written by: Huseyn Javid
- Original language: Azerbaijani
- Genre: Tragedy
- Setting: 1933

Premiere
- Date premiered: 1934
- Place premiered: Azerbaijan State Academic Drama Theatre

Siyavush (Azerbaijani: Səyavuş) is a legendary-historic play, a tragedy in five acts written by Huseyn Javid, an Azerbaijani poet and playwright in 1932-1933. It is based on motifs of an ancient story from “Shahnameh” poem by Ferdowsi, to the 1000th anniversary of the poet. In 1934, the play was published and then staged by Ismayil Hidayetzade.

The play is about a destiny of young Siyavush, who lapses into philosophic thoughts about assignment of a human being, happiness and meaning of the life. Siyavush has been brought up on heroic traditions of the nation. He follows a “Be fair” behest and stands up for the interest of nation. Siyavush perishes without finding the truth and fairness both in Iran and Turan and he understands that the truth is only in the struggle against despotism.

== Photos ==
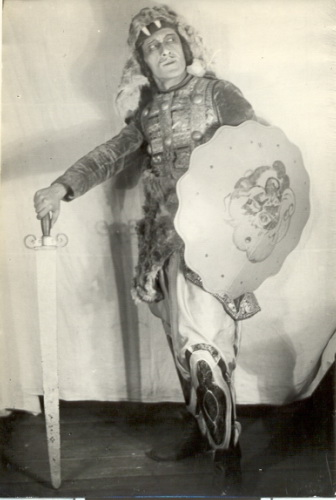
Ulvi Rajab as Siyavush. Azerbaijan State Academic Drama Theatre. 1934.

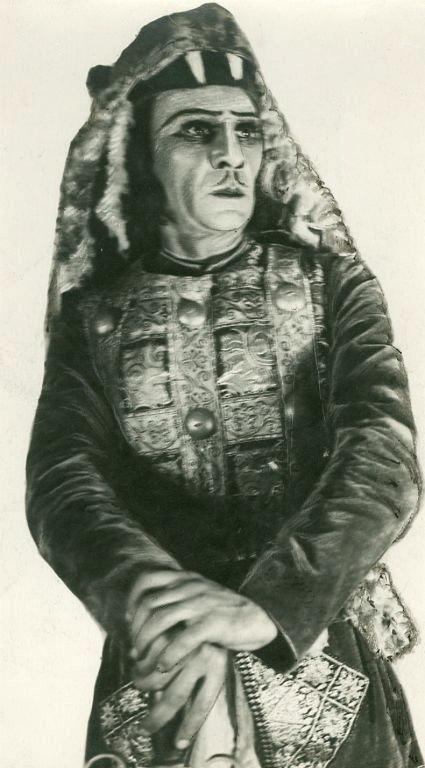
Abbas Mirza Sharifzadeh as Siyavush.
