= Samadabad, Fars =

Samadabad صمداباد
- Village
- Location within Iran
- Coordinates: 29°43′49″N 51°32′50″E
- Country: Iran
- Province: Fars
- County: Kazerun
- Bakhsh: Central
- Rural District: Deris

Population (2006)
  - Total: 128
- Time zone: UTC+3:30 (IRST)
  - Summer (DST): UTC+4:30 (IRDT)

Samadabad (Persian: صمداباد, also Romanized as Şamadābād) is a village in Deris Rural District, in the Central District of Kazerun County, Fars province, Iran. At the 2006 census, its population was 128, in 28 families.
