= Səmədabad, Goranboy =

Səmədabad
- Municipality
- Location within Azerbaijan
- Coordinates: 40°41′06″N 46°38′58″E
- Country: Azerbaijan
- Rayon: Goranboy

Population
  - Total: 1,245
- Time zone: UTC+4 (AZT)
  - Summer (DST): UTC+5 (AZT)

Səmədabad (also, Samedabad) is a village and municipality in the Goranboy Rayon of Azerbaijan. It has a population of 1,245. The municipality consists of the villages of Səmədabad and Xəsədərli.
