= Samadabad, Gilan =

Samadabad صمداباد
- Village
- Location within Iran
- Coordinates: 36°47′31″N 50°11′40″E
- Country: Iran
- Province: Gilan
- County: Rudsar
- Bakhsh: Rahimabad
- Rural District: Shuil

Population (2006)
  - Total: 33
- Time zone: UTC+3:30 (IRST)
  - Summer (DST): UTC+4:30 (IRDT)

Samadabad (Persian: صمداباد, also Romanized as Şamadābād) is a village in Shuil Rural District, Rahimabad District, Rudsar County, Gilan Province, Iran. At the 2006 census, its population was 33, in 10 families.
