= Samadabad, East Azerbaijan =

Samadabad صمداباد
- Village
- Location within Iran
- Coordinates: 38°19′17″N 46°59′00″E
- Country: Iran
- Province: East Azerbaijan
- County: Heris
- Bakhsh: Central
- Rural District: Bedevostan-e Sharqi

Population (2006)
  - Total: 61
- Time zone: UTC+3:30 (IRST)
  - Summer (DST): UTC+4:30 (IRDT)

Samadabad (Persian: صمداباد, also Romanized as Şamadābād) is a village in Bedevostan-e Sharqi Rural District, in the Central District of Heris County, East Azerbaijan Province, Iran. At the 2006 census, its population was 61, in 14 families.
