= Mausoleum of Huseyn Javid =

Burial site in Nakhchivan, Azerbaijan

Huseyn Javid Mausoleum
- Hüseyn Cavid məqbərəsi
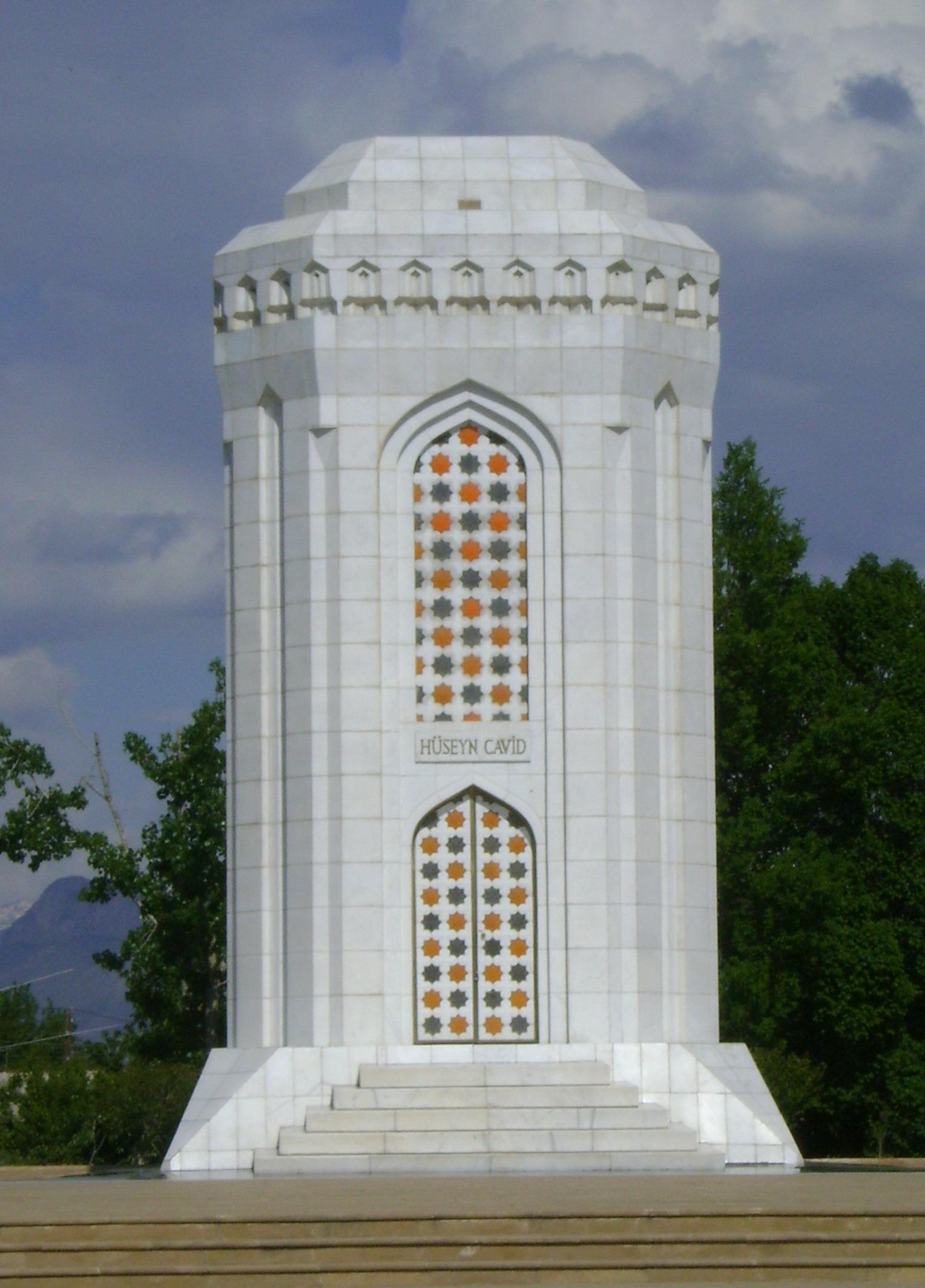
- Mausoleum of famous Azerbaijani poet Huseyn Javid at Nakhchivan City (Nakhchivan Region of Azerbaijan Republic)
- Interactive map of Huseyn Javid Mausoleum
- Location: Nakhchivan, Azerbaijan
- Designer: Rasim Aliyev and Omar Eldarov
- Type: Mausoleum
- Completion date: 1996
- Dedicated to: Huseyn Javid

Mausoleum of Huseyn Javid (Azerbaijani: Hüseyn Cavid məqbərəsi) – is a mausoleum erected on a grave of Huseyn Javid, an eminent Azerbaijani poet and playwright, in Nakhchivan.

== History ==
The complex was erected on the initiative Heydar Aliyev, the third president of Azerbaijan. Graves of Mishkinaz khanim – Huseyn Javid’s wife, Ertoghrul – Huseyn Javid’s son and Turan khanim – Huseyn Javid’s daughter are also in a vault of the mausoleum. The mausoleum was built on October 29, 1996 on the occasion of the 114th anniversary of Huseyn Javid’s birth.

== Architectural features ==
The mausoleum, built in Nakchivan-Maragha architectural style, consists of two parts – upper and lower. There is Huseyn Javid’s bust in the internal part of the mausoleum. Rasim Aliyev - Honored Architect of Azerbaijan is the author of the project and Omar Eldarov – People’s Artist of Azerbaijan is its sculptor.
