= Sumgait State Musical Drama Theater =

Sumgayit State Musical Drama Theater.

Sumgait State Musical Drama Theater is a professional theater operating in Sumgayit, Azerbaijan. It is named after Huseyn Arablinski.

== History ==
The Sumgait State Drama Theater was created in September 1968. In 1969, the Azerbaijani government decided to name the theater after Azerbaijani theater figure and director Huseyn Arablinski. This was enacted as a decision of the Cabinet of Ministers of Azerbaijan SSR and by the order of the Ministry of Culture.

The theater raised its curtain on March 14, 1969 with Mirza Fatali Akhundzadeh's "Monsieur Jordan, the Botanist, and Dervish Mastali-shah", directed by Jannat Salimova. It was established by order of the Republic's Minister of Culture on 10 July 1968. On the following day, the British poet John Patrick's work was performed, produced by Nasir Sadigzade. In 1974 the theater was given the status of "Sumgait State Drama Theater" by the decision of the Ministry of Culture.

== Repertoire ==
Theater interior

The repertoire of the theater includes the plays of classic and contemporary Azerbaijani, Russian and foreign playwrights.
