= Cinema of the Russian Empire =

The Cinema of the Russian Empire (Pre-reform Russian orthography: Синематографъ Россійской Имперіи) roughly spans the period 1907 - 1920, during which time a strong infrastructure was created.

In April 1896, just four months after the first films were shown in Paris, the first cinematic apparatus appeared in Russia. The first films seen in the Russian Empire were via the Lumière brothers, in Moscow and St. Petersburg in May 1896. In the same month, the first film was shot in Russia, by Lumière cameraman Camille Cerf, a record of the coronation of Nicholas II at the Kremlin in Moscow. The first permanent cinema was opened in St Petersburg in 1896 at Nevsky Prospect, No. 46.

The first Russian movies were shown in the Moscow Korsh Theatre by artist Vladimir Sashin. After purchasing a Vitagraph projector, Sashin started to make short films, which by August 1896 were being demonstrated to theatre audiences after the theatre performance had ended.

== See also ==
- Film studios of the Russian Empire
- Cinema of the Soviet Union
- Cinema of Russia
