= Səmədabad, Bilasuvar =

Səmədabad
- Municipality
- Location within Azerbaijan
- Coordinates: 39°32′38″N 48°19′17″E
- Country: Azerbaijan
- Rayon: Bilasuvar

Population
  - Total: 2,432
- Time zone: UTC+4 (AZT)
  - Summer (DST): UTC+5 (AZT)

Səmədabad is a village and municipality in the Bilasuvar Rayon of Azerbaijan. It has a population of 2,432.
