= Sheikh Sanan (play) =

1915 play written by Huseyn Javid

Sheikh Sanan Azerbaijani: Şeyx Sənan
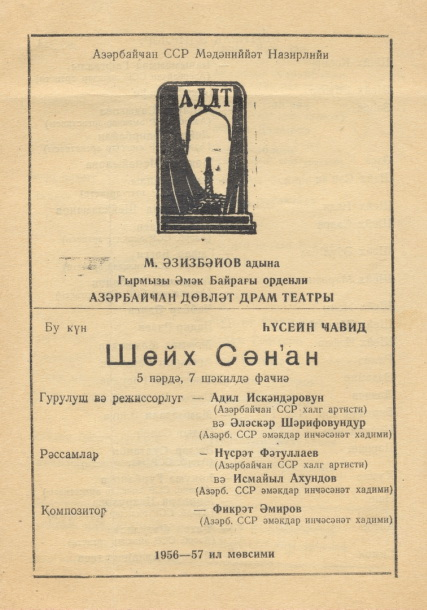
- Poster of the spectacle. 1956-1957. Azerbaijan State Academic Drama Theatre
- Written by: Huseyn Javid
- Characters: Sheikh Sanan; Khumar others
- Original language: Azerbaijani
- Genre: Tragedy
- Setting: 1914

Premiere
- Date premiered: 1921
- Place premiered: Azerbaijan State Academic Drama Theatre

Sheikh Sanan (Azerbaijani: Şeyx Sənan), is a verse play, tragedy in five acts, written by an Azerbaijani poet and playwright Huseyn Javid about love of a Muslim sheikh - Sanan to a Georgian-Christian girl Khumar. It is based on an old story first made famous by the Persian poet Attar Neyshapuri in The Conference of the Birds. As it was noted, a romantic riot against the anti-humanistic reality of religion is expressed in images of the main heroes of the play – Sanan and Khumar. Sanan, being a true believer Muslim and a notable scientist, dissuades from Islam and rejects its basis, blames all religions for separation of people. Sheikh Sanan opposes the world of love, friendship and humanity to the world of blind faith and dead religious dogmatics. Such anti-clerical thoughts, which had been already said by the poet in numerous lyrical works, were summed up in the play.

The play was written in 1912-1914, during Javid’s lifetime in Tiflis and Nakhchivan. In 1915-1916, the play was published in various newspapers, in Baku. As a book it was published in 1917, by a publishing house of “Achig Soz” newspaper. For the first time it was staged in 1921, on a stage of the State Theatre. It was repeatedly published in 1926, 1958 and 1968.

== Plot ==
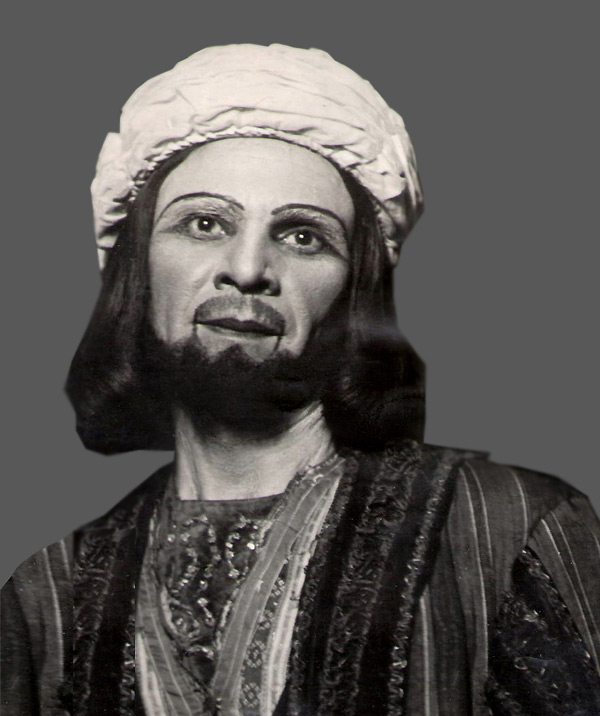
Abbas Mirza Sharifzadeh in the role of Sheikh Sanan

Two images – Sanan and Khumar – stand in the center of the play. Sanan - a person of high intellect and moral purity, getting a religious education, penetrates into it with great hesitations. He began to keep away from people who believe in religious tales and looks for the God in himself. Hesitations of Sanan calls the anger of fanatics surrounding him and this anger strengthens after they know about Sanan’s love to the Georgian girl Khumar – a marvelous beauty, whom he had seen in his dream and after long searches found her in reality. He loved the girl in Tiflis and agreed with conditions of the girl’s father that he will burn the Quran and become a swineherd.

Neither national, nor religious prejudices couldn’t redeem Sanan’s love to Khumar, in which they saw the highest demonstration of human being and destroyed all barriers standing on their way. In the name of love, Sanan ultimately broke off with the environment surrounding him and lapsed from Quran. He made sure that religion is an evil, which sows seeds of discords among nations and separates people. A theme of ideal love is opposed to violence, fanaticism and prejudices in the play. But, finally, Sanan and Khumar gained the victory over surrounding them evil. Persecuted by fanatics, they found their salvation in death.
