= Samadabad, South Khorasan =

Samadabad صمداباد
- Village
- Location within Iran
- Coordinates: 32°10′59″N 58°57′51″E
- Country: Iran
- Province: South Khorasan
- County: Khusf
- Bakhsh: Jolgeh-e Mazhan
- Rural District: Qaleh Zari

Population (2006)
  - Total: 11
- Time zone: UTC+3:30 (IRST)
  - Summer (DST): UTC+4:30 (IRDT)

Samadabad (Persian: صمداباد, also Romanized as Şamadābād; also known as Samanābād, Samandābād, and Samaudābād) is a village in Qaleh Zari Rural District, Jolgeh-e Mazhan District, Khusf County, South Khorasan Province, Iran. At the 2006 census, its population was 11, in 6 families.
