= The Devil (Javid play) =

1918 verse play by Huseyn Javid

The Devil Azerbaijani: İblis / ابلیس
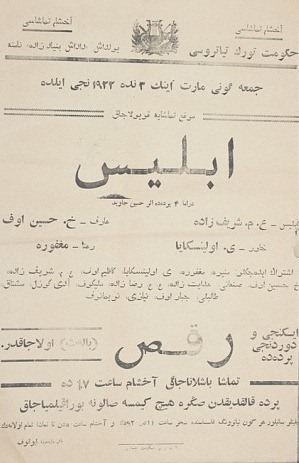
- Poster. 26 May 1922. State Turkic Theatre
- Original language: Azerbaijani
- Written by: Huseyn Javid
- Characters: Devil; Arif; Vasif; Rena; Ibn Yemin; Khaver; Elkhan
- Genre: Tragedy
- Setting: 1918

Premiere
- Date: December 21, 1920
- Place: Azerbaijan State Academic Drama Theatre

Iblis (Azerbaijani: İblis / ابلیس) is a verse play (verse dram), tragedy in four acts of an Azerbaijani poet and playwright Huseyn Javid, written in 1918. Ideological credo of Javid is revealed in the play, a mystic flaw is strongly expressed and the poet's thoughts about a problem of human's happiness followed by the imperialistic war are reflected in the poem.

Initially the tragedy was staged in 1920, by Abbas Mirza Sharifzadeh. It is noted that, at the beginning of the 1920s the play had a great success. “Iblis” is considered as the first verse play of Azerbaijan, which was put on the stage. It is also noted that the play is significant not only for its complex philosophic character, and also for a romantic style.

The play was published in 1924, for the first time. Later, it was published in 1927, 1959, 1969, 1982, 2001 and 2005. In the Small Soviet Encyclopedia of 1931, the work was called a poem. It is considered one of the best plays of Huseyn Javid.

== Roles ==
- Iblis
- Angel
- Old Sheikh – a grey-haired solitary
- Khaver – old sheikh’s granddaughter
- Arif – modestly-dressed young man
- Vasif – a Turkish officer (Arif’s youngest brother)
- Junior officer – Vasif’s comrade
- Rena – a beautiful nurse (Turkish girl)
- Ibn Emin – an Arab, 45 years aged officer
- Wounded officer of the Russian Army – a young man
- Negro – Ibn Emin’s batman
- Ghost of Rena's grandfather
- Elkhan – an officer (a deserter and brigand)
- Officers, warriors, brigands, dancers (Arab), strong men, ghosts, musicians and others.

== Plot ==
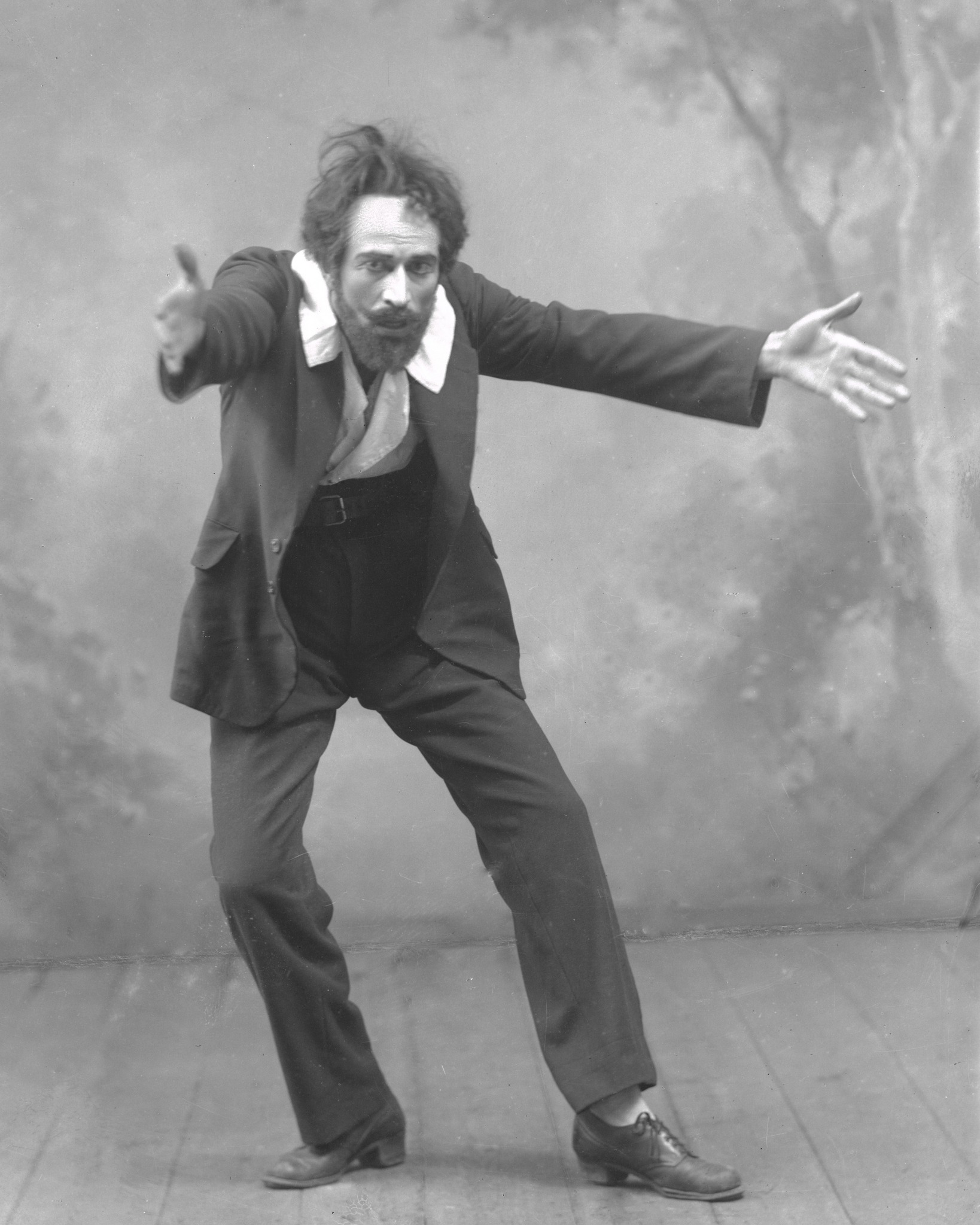
Kazim Ziya in the role of Arif. Azerbaijan State Academic Drama Theatre. 1922. Stage director Abbas Mirza Sharifzadeh

Events take place in the Near East during World War I. Arif - the main hero of the play – is very humane and romantic young man. With the help of Iblis image, Huseyn Javid created a character of people, who sell their souls to the devil for money. According to the author, souls of these people aren’t free, they are in captivity of the devil and the devil rules the souls of people, for whom the material welfare is considered the main stimulus.

Arif was puzzled with occupational wars, violence of people, crime and betrayal, but by the grace of the God he sees the salvation of humanity, believes in his confluence with the free world. But, eventually Arif obeys to the Satan, becomes a murderer of his wife and brother and also becomes a greedy for gold and wealth. He could not only reunite with the dreamed world, but also became shabby. Arif, who lived with great ideas, couldn’t become higher than a simple man and finally drag out a miserable existence.

== History of staging ==
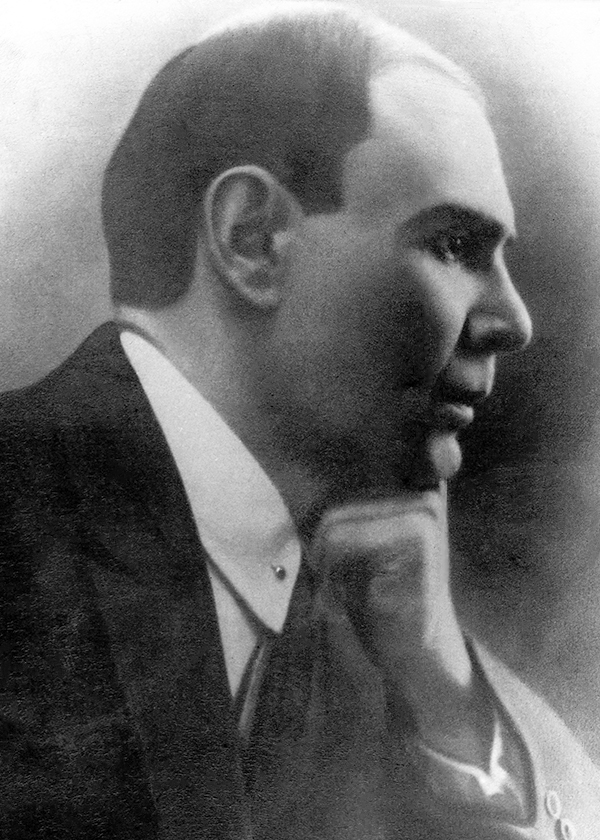
Abbas Mirza Sharifzadeh, the first actor of "Iblis" role

For the first time, the play was put on the stage of the State Theatre on December 21, 1920 by Abbas Mirza Sharifzade. “Iblis” is considered as the first verse drama of Azerbaijan, which was put on the stage. The first staging of “Iblis” is considered as a significant event in the theatrical life of Azerbaijan. Then, the theatre used all available facilities in order to make a colorful romantic spectacle. Despite minor technical means, the theater achieved interesting views for war, fire scenes, effective disappearance and appearance of personages. A scene of feast in the last act was also very interesting. Ballet was broadly used in the play.

Iblis’s piece was played by Sharifzade himself. Critics noted that this character created by Sharifzade, didn’t remind of the “European” Mephistopheles at all. And whereas the poet was far from a presentation of the Devil’s appearance, which was typical for the Eastern folklore (where it was often described as blind in one eye). It is considered that Iblis created by Sharifzade was strict, magnificent, angry, embodying evil and revenge, spreading fear and confusion, was pathetic and ironic. And when Iblis assumed the aspect of human, the actor played a piece of an experienced old man, inclined to philosophic thoughts seeming humane, calling sympathy of surrounding him people. It is also noted that “a romantic ardor, by which a quite complex philosophic subject matter of the play is revealed in the theatre” called “warm sympathy of the spectators”. In December, 1920 a premiere of the play was held in Tashkent with a staging of Uzbek State Troup in Azerbaijani.

For the second time the tragedy was played in Azerbaijan State Drama Theatre a year later, in 1921, with that very staging. Then it was staged by such stage directors as Alexander Ivanov (in 1922) and Alexander Tuganov (in 1926). Theater expert Ilham Rahimli noted that these stagings had either positive or negative moments.

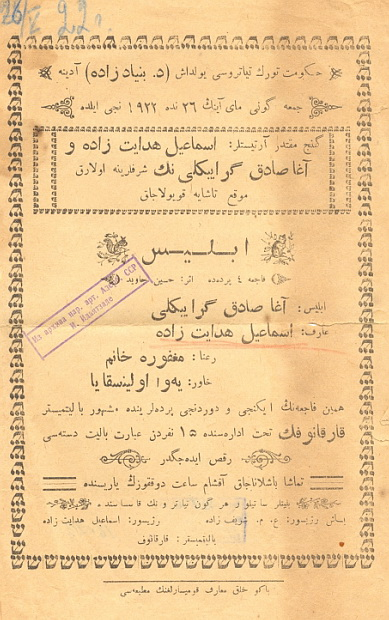
Poster of the spectacle staged on May 26, 1922 in honor of Ismayil Hidayetzade and Aghasadyg Garaybeyli. Azerbaijan State Academic Drama Theatre

Already in the first years of the Soviet power's existence, the play was translated into Uzbek language. In 1923, the play was staged in Uzbek language.

It was noted that in 1921-1924's the play was staged in Uzbekistan by efforts of Hamza – a cultural figure of Uzbekistan. Influence of this play on development of theatrical art in Uzbekistan and in other republics of Middle Asia was also mentioned. In 1924, the play was put on the stage in Tashkent.

The last staging of the play, during the author's lifetime, was held in 1925.

In 1983, while preparing for the 100th anniversary of Huseyn Javid, Azerbaijan State Academic Drama Theatre included “Iblis” tragedy in their repertoire. Artistic council of the theatre entrusted the staging of the spectacle to Mehdi Mammadov. Mehdi mammadov's “Iblis” possessed a philosophic and psychological depth. The spectacle was staged “in a style of a synthesis of monumentalism and modernism”. The stage director showed the essence of the tragedy's subject matter on the basis of international political relations, because of which it is considered that the spectacle was “original, fresh, compositionally grandiose and majestic”. It was also noted that, an eternal conflict between good and evil, humanity and the Devil's home was expressed through Huseyn Javid's poetry. The Devil's home was expressed through a modern threat of atom and hydrogen bomb. Aydin Azimov's “horror influencing” music, which is based on tremolo string and ostinato beats of timpani, dissonances of woodwind and brass instruments of orchestra created panicky condition of humanity before the terrible.

== Analysis of the play ==
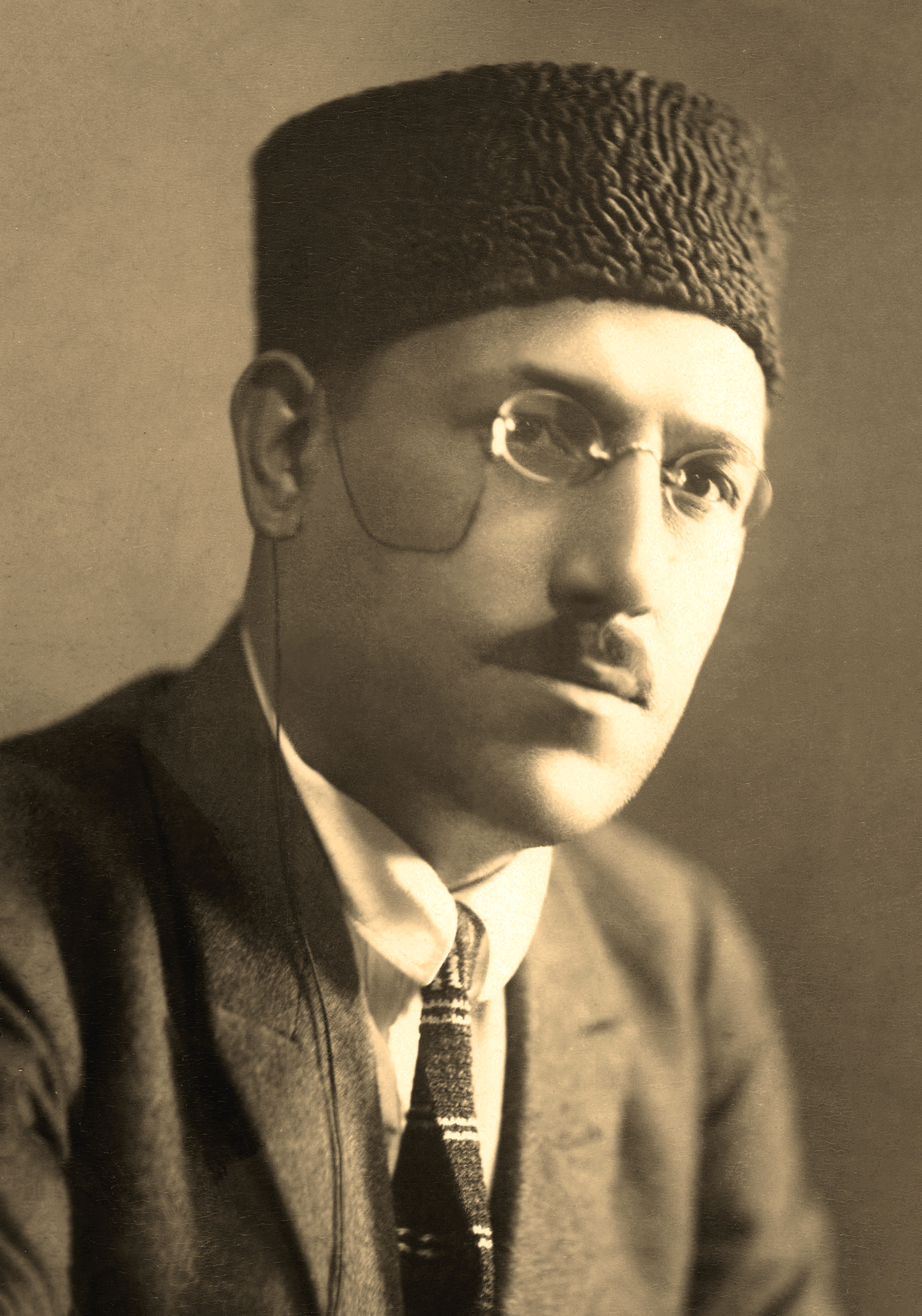
Huseyn Javid, author of the play

As it was pointed out, in the play Huseyn Javid protests against devastating wars and their inspirers, unmasks rotten philosophy of non-resistance to evil, and also “naïve hope of people for triumph of good beginning in the capitalistic world”. It is considered that the dram was written under a perceptible influence of Goethe’s “Faust”, but a literary critic Ali Nazim calls it “Faust’s” imitation. After publication Javid's drama was compared with Pushkin. In investigations of 1937, a tendentious character was given to its popularity; for instance, in B.V.Chobanzade’s work he is referred to Ali Nazim’s citation about Huseyn Javid as “he was the one of rare talents in the whole Soviet Union”.

It is also considered that critics directed to anti-humanistic nature of imperialism were sounded in the dram. It is noted that humanistic ideas of the author were realized in Iblis's image – an image of “evil”, the unmasker of human's betrayals and crimes. Huseyn Javid denies a well-known belief about that “the devil is the source of all human troubles” in his work. The poet says, no, all misfortunes come from human's self-interest, from “ruthless kings”, “emirs, shahs, tsars and beys of any country”, form “priests of different religions”.

Poet and publicist Mikayil Rzaguluzade thinks that Javid attempted to solve the issue abstractly, in non-social plan, without revealing imperialistic reality of wars and bloody battles in concrete historical images. It is also noted that there were a lot of Pan-Turkism mistakes of the author, too. Even before the author's arrest, it was stated that Javid's conversion to a peculiar combination of rationalism and subjectivism, social idealism and mysticism were also marked in “Iblis”.

According to literary critic Ali Nazim, the main heroes of the drama – Arif, Vasif and Iblis – were different variations of pivotal image of Javid's creativity. It was also outlined that this is also the image of "Turkish bourgeois intelligentsia of war-time and pre-revolutionary period, which is spiritually a dualist", which is an embodiment of all socio-psychological and ideological-political reality of Javid's group of intelligents. Nazim writes that in play Javid “comes out in a mask of the Demon on one hand, and in form of Arif, - on the other.”

Hamid Arasli noted that, the influence of the Turkish poet Tevfik Fikret is quite perceptible in a language, visual methods and techniques of this tragedy, and that the “Iblis” play revealed a new stage in the history of Azerbaijan's dramaturgy, besides with “Sheikh Sanan” play.

== Screening ==
In 2007, a film of a film-director Ramiz Hasanoglu called “Javid’s life” and written according to the screen script of Anar – People's Writer of Azerbaijan – was released. A tragic destiny of Huseyn Javid (plays Rasim Balayev) against the background of his works, such as “Sheikh Sanan”, “Siyavush”, “Lame Teymur” were shown in the film. Character of Iblis (plays Mammad Safa), a negative hero, became prevailing personage of the film. As it was decided, this character had to be played by one of the actors as a symbol of universal evil, but proceeding from the author's ideas about the multi-faced evil, Iblis appears or in the image of a mystic devil, or an investigator of NKVD, or a lazy priest and or a terrorist-murderer. Sowing death around him, the Iblis himself remains immortal...

In the film, evil bursts into Javid's life, attempting to break it, trying to get it under its own control, make it an acquiescent tool of its evil will. There was shown that neither the arrest, nor a forcible separation with dears and the death itself couldn’t crack Javid down. As the script writer notes, a conditional and symbolic form of the play can be realized in ballet or rock-opera genres, but not in a movie. That is why the idea of eternal evil was used as a basis of the film and the destiny of Javid was thread on it. According to Anar, universality of this idea embodied in the images of such personalities as Stalin, Mussolini and Baghirov.
