= Abbas Mirza Sharifzadeh =

Azerbaijani actor

- Abbas Mirzə Şərifzadə
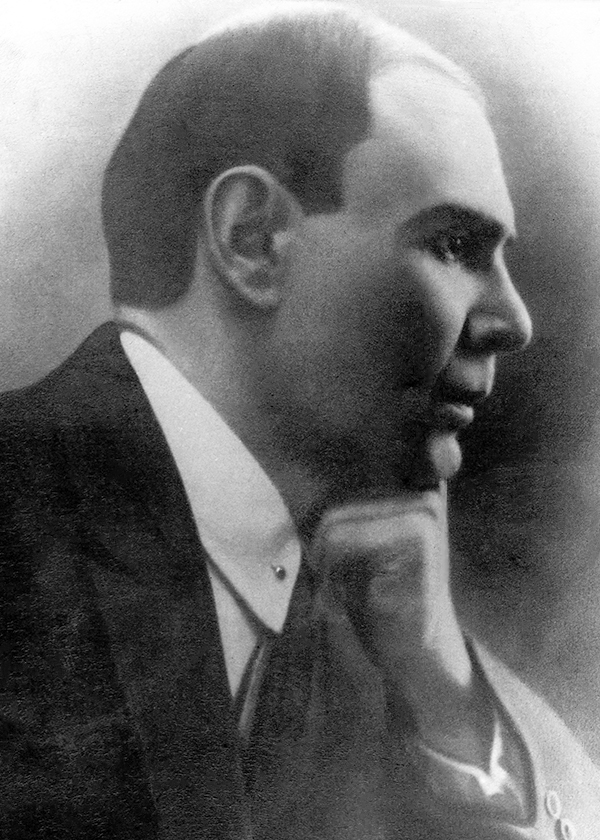
- Abbas Mirza Sharifzadeh
- Born: Abbas Mirza Mirza Abdulrasul oghlu Sharifzadeh; March 22, 1893; Shamakhi, Baku Governorate, Russian Empire
- Died: 16 November 1938 (aged 45); Baku, Azerbaijan SSR, USSR
- Other name: Abbas-Mirza Sharif-Zade
- Education: Azerbaijan State Academic Drama Theatre
- Occupation: Actor
- Years active: 1908–1937
- Spouse: Hanifa Akchurina
- Partner: Marziyya Davudova
- Children: 3

Abbas Mirza Mirza Abdulrasul oghlu Sharifzadeh (Azerbaijani: Abbas Mirzə Mirzə Əbdülrəsul oğlu Şərifzadə; 22 March 1893 in Shamakhi – 16 November 1938 in Baku) was a Soviet Azerbaijan actor of opera, theatre, and silent film; a film director; and a film editor. He was awarded the title Honored Artist of the Azerbaijan SSR (1935).

== Early life and theatre career ==
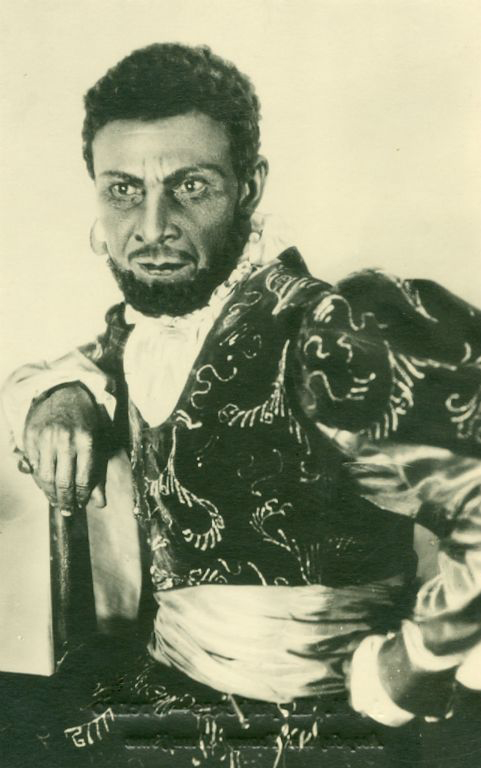
Abbas Mirza Sharifzadeh playing Othello

Abbas Mirza Sharifzadeh was born into a family of a teacher, who taught at Seyid Azim Shirvani's Usul-i Jadid school. After the 1902 Shamakhi earthquake, the family moved to Baku, where Sharifzadeh became a member of a drama club at his school.

In 1908, he started acting in serious plays, including The Imaginary Invalid. He was part of the theatre troop of the Gadzhibekov family (which included Uzeyir Hajibeyov). But he had not gained fame until a successful portrayal of Agha Mohammad Khan Qajar in Abdurrahim bey Hagverdiyev's play of the same name in 1911. Not having received any professional training in dramatic arts Sharifzadeh was remembered for his outstanding performance of primary roles in stagings of both local and Western pieces. In 1916, he starred in the play the Grief of Fakhreddin, as the lead role Fakhraddin.

== Career as a film actor and director ==
Sharifzadeh first appeared on screen in the 1916 Russian movie Knyaz Temir-Bulat. In 1924, he played the role of the Khan in the Azerbaijani film Baygush ("Owl"). His other notable role was in the movie Avaz-avaza ("An eye for an eye") in 1929.

Sharifzadeh directed both feature films and documentaries. The former directed by him include Bismillah ("In the Name of God", 1925), Haji Gara (1929) and Mahabbat oyunu ("The Game of Love", 1935); and the latter, Azerbaijana sayahat ("A Journey to Azerbaijan", 1924) and Shakhsei-vakhsei (1929).

== Arrest and execution ==
On 4 December 1937, at the peak of the Great Purge, Sharifzadeh was arrested on the counts of espionage, after the performance of "Macbeth" at the Azerbaijan State Academic National Drama Theatre. The evidence used against him were his frequent visits to the Iranian consulate in Ganja in 1932. The real reason for those visits, according to his colleagues, were friendly relations between a group of stage actors, of which Sharifzadeh was part, and the Iranian consul who admired Azerbaijani theatre and would often invite them for reunions.

His émigré brother's active role in the formation of the Azerbaijan Democratic Republic in 1918–1920 contributed to the government's will to get rid of the actor. Sharifzadeh was also accused of promoting via theatre the works of the earlier arrested poets Mikayil Mushfig and Huseyn Javid (the former would later be executed and the latter would be exiled to Siberia). On 19 October 1938 he was found guilty on all charges and executed by firing squad less than a month later. He was exonerated posthumously after Joseph Stalin's death.

== Personal life ==
In 1919, Sharifzadeh was married to Hanifa Akchurina, and together had two sons (born 1922 and 1923). He later lived with actress Marziyya Davudova, with whom they had their daughter Firangiz Sharifova (born 1924), an actress. Their great-grandson was the winner of Eurovision 2011 Eldar Gasimov.

Sharifzadeh's family

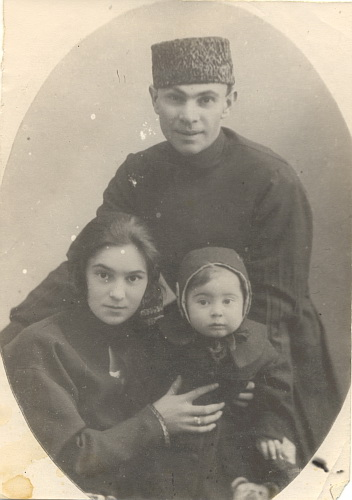
Sharifzade with wife Hanifa Akchurina and son Ertogrul

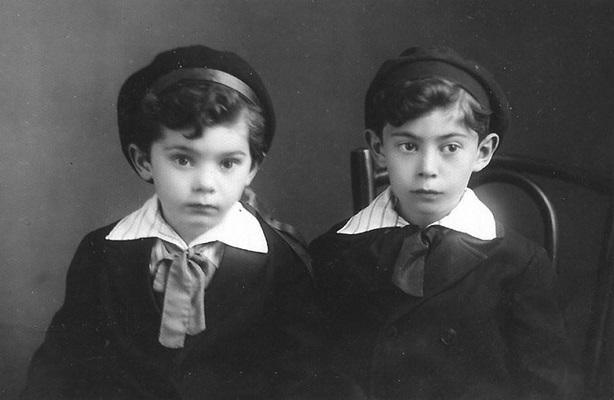
Sharifzade's two sons, Ertogrul and Karatay

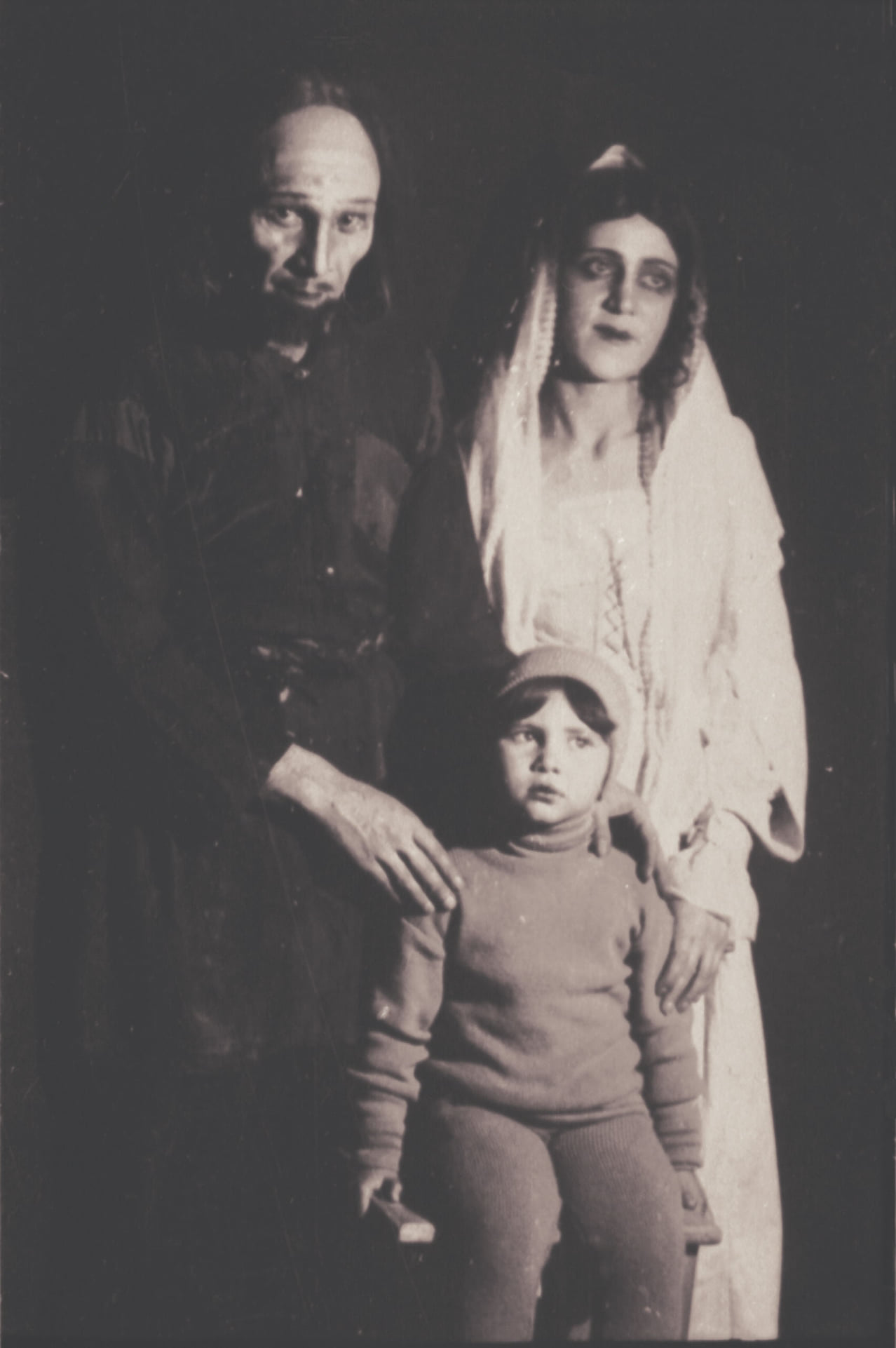
Sharifzade with partner Marziyya Davudova and their daughter Firangiz Sharifova

== Filmography ==
=== As actor ===
Filmography as actor
Date	Work	Role	Notes
1916	Prince Demir Bulat (Azerbaijani: Knyaz Demir Bulat; Russian: Князь Демир Булат)	actor	A silent film melodrama about complex relationships.
1924	Owl (Azerbaijani: Baygush; Russian: Сова)	Khan, elderly peasant	
1924	An Eye-for-an-Eye (Azerbaijani: Avaz-avaza)		

=== As filmmaker ===
Filmography as filmmaker
Date	Work	Role	Notes
1925	Bismillah	director	
1929	Haji Gara (Azerbaijani: Haci Qara; Russian: Гаджи-Кара)	director	Screen adaptation of the play "Sona" by Mirza Fatali Akhundov
1935	The Game of Love (Azerbaijani: Mahabbat oyunu; Russian: Игра в любовь)	director	A romantic comedy silent film.

== See also ==
- List of People's Artistes of the Azerbaijan SSR
