= Huseyn Javid =

Azerbaijani poet and playwright (1882–1941)

Huseyn Javid Hüseyn Cavid
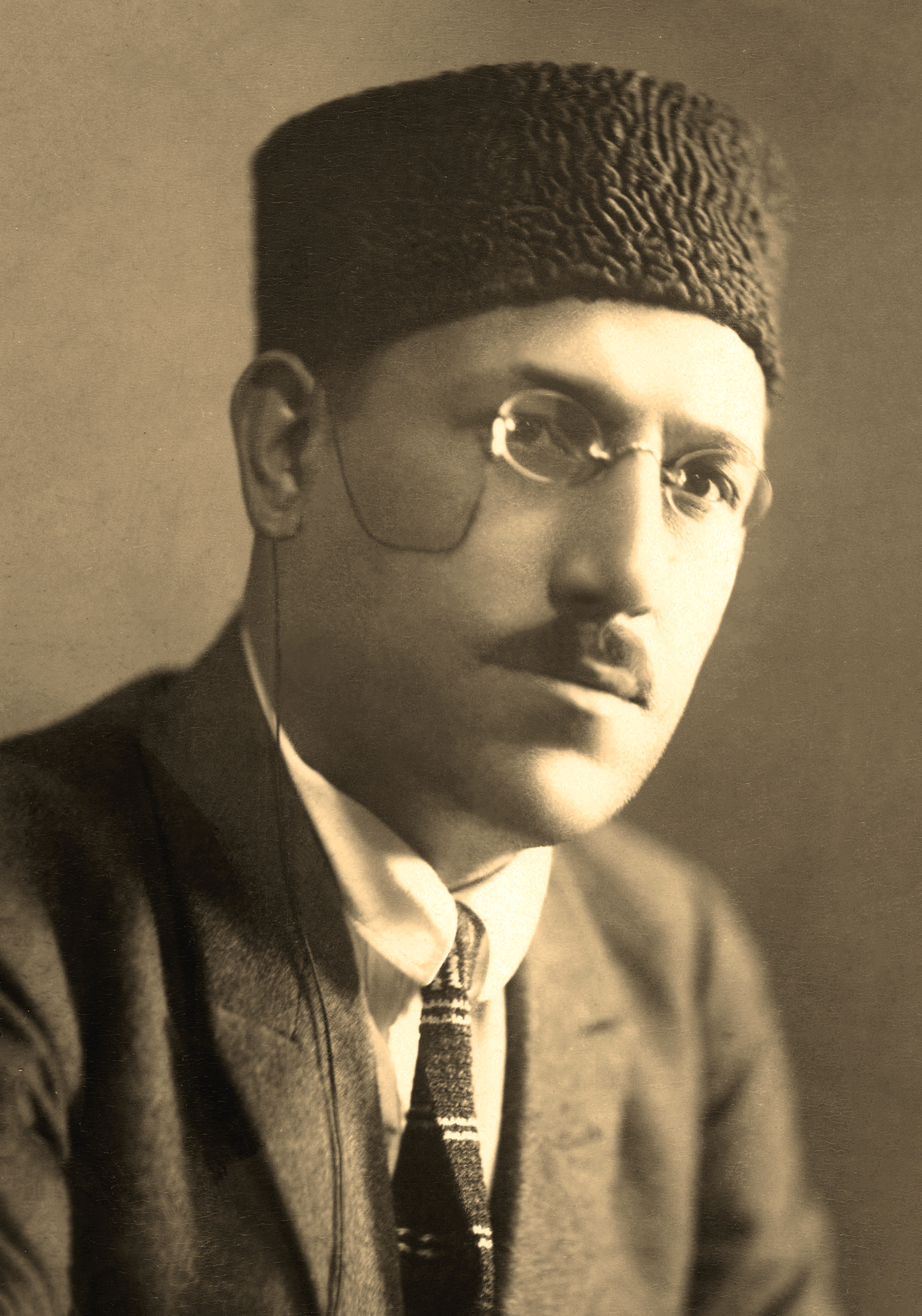
- Born: Huseyn Abdulla oghlu Rasizadeh; October 24, 1882; Nakhchivan
- Died: December 5, 1941 (aged 59); Shevchenko, Tayshetsky District, Irkutsk Oblast
- Burial place: Huseyn Javid Mausoleum
- Occupations: Poet, playwright
- Notable work: Iblis (The Devil)

Huseyn Javid (Azerbaijani: Hüseyn Cavid), was born Huseyn Abdulla oghlu Rasizadeh (24 October 1882 in Nakhchivan – 5 December 1941 in Shevchenko, Tayshetsky District), was a prominent Azerbaijani poet and playwright of the early 20th century. He was one of the founders of progressive romanticism movement in the contemporary Azerbaijani literature. He was exiled during the Stalin purges in the USSR.

== Life and career ==
Huseyn Abdulla oglu Rasizadeh was born in 1882 to a family of a theologian in Nakhchivan in the Erivan Governorate. After completing his elementary education at a religious school in 1898, Javid pursued his mid-school education in the Maktab-i Tarbiya of Mashadi Taghi Sidgi. In 1899–1903, Huseyn Javid studied in the Talibiyya Madrasah in Tabriz. After obtaining a degree in literature at the Istanbul University in 1909, Javid worked as a teacher in Nakhchivan, Ganja and Tiflis, and starting from 1915 in Baku.

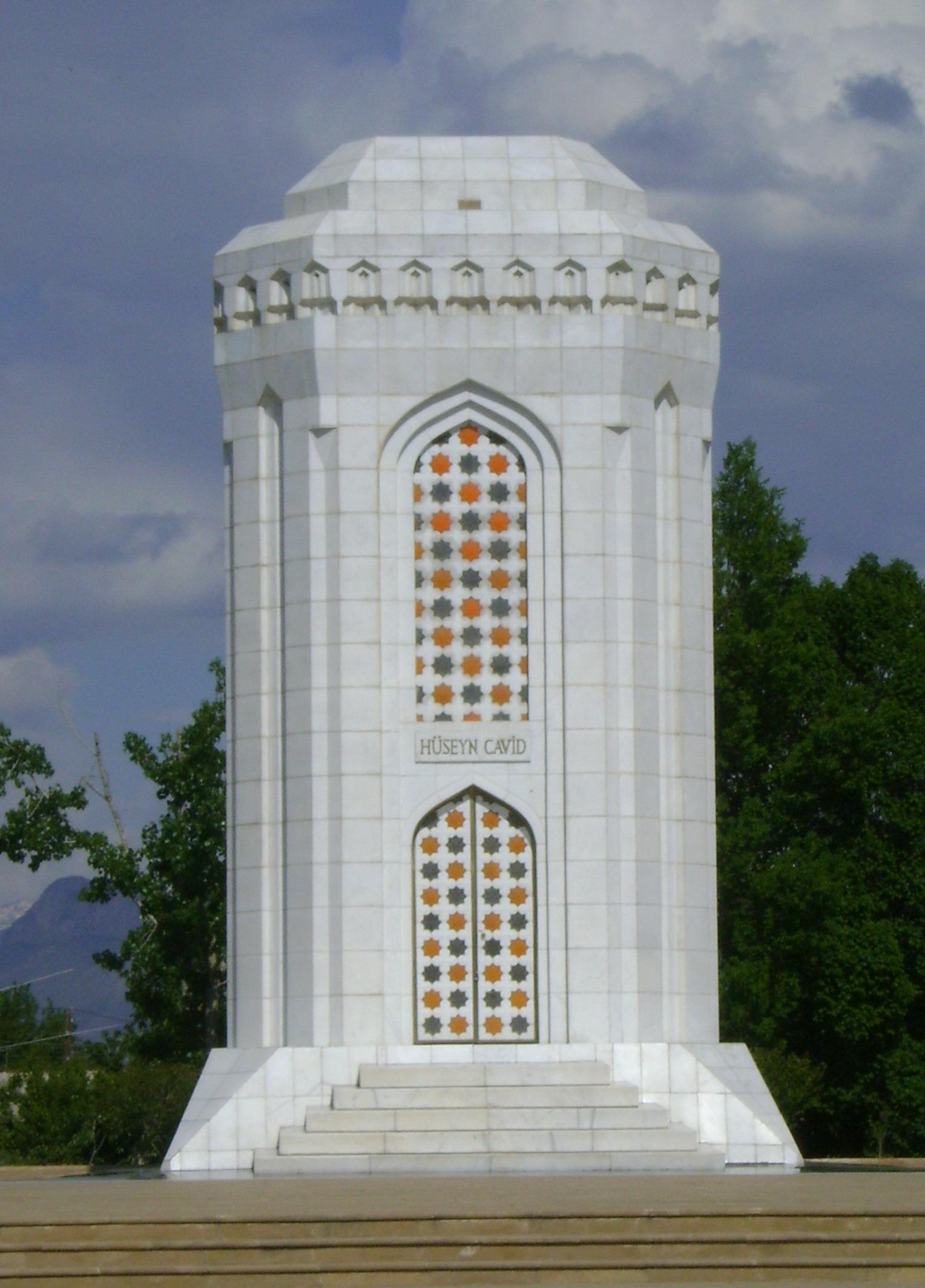
Huseyn Javid Mausoleum, Nakhchivan

Huseyn Javid's first book of lyrical poems titled Kechmish gunlar ("The Past Days") was published in 1913. However, Javid was known more as a playwright. His philosophical and epic tragedies, and family dramas introduce a new line of development in Azerbaijani literature. In his literary tragedy Sheikh Sanan (1914), Huseyn Javid philosophized about the idea of a universal religion to lift interreligious barrier between humans. His most famous creation, Iblis (The Devil) written in 1918, exposed all oppressive forces as the supporters of "humans are wolves to each other" philosophy and "the 20th century cultural savages", and summarized them in the character of Satan. In his works, Javid criticized any form of colonialism and oppression.

During the 1920s and 1930s, Huseyn Javid authored a number of historical epics, such as Peyghambar (The Prophet) in 1922, Topal Teymur (Timur) in 1925, Sayavush (Siyâvash) in 1933 and Khayyam (Khayyám) in 1935.

=== Arrest, exile and death ===
Huseyn Javid wrote during the time of Collectivization and Stalin purges in the Soviet Azerbaijan. In the worst times of totalitarianism, he refused to serve as propagandist of "revolutionary socialist achievements". Javid was arrested in 1937 on trumped-up charges of being a "founding member of a counter-revolutionary group that was plotting an overthrow of the Soviet power".

His arrest was a part of the nationwide campaign of purge against intelligentsia. The Soviet government exiled Huseyn Javid to the Far East to the city of Magadan, Siberia in the late 1930s. He died on 5 December 1941 in the village of Shevchenko (Tayshetsky District). Huseyn Javid was officially exonerated in 1956. His repatriation came only on Javid's 100th birthday in 1982, when his remains were moved from Shevchenko back to his homeland of Nakhchivan and reburied in a mausoleum built in Javid's honor. Monument to Javid was built in King's Park in Podgorica in 2013.

One of the primary work of Huseyn Javid is his “Iblis (The Evil)” tragedy, written in 1918. The author concludes all his observations during the processes were happening at the beginning of the 20th century. Javid creates his main character “evil”. In this work of tragedy the author touches several pressing issues which concerned him, such as wars and their tragic consequences, the causes of wars (including human ego) and his philosophical views regarding the future destiny of the world.

== List of works ==
=== Works of Huseyn Javid up to 1920 ===
Name	Year	Genre
Ana (Mother)	1913	Drama
Maral	1912	Drama
Kechmish Gunlar (The Old Days) (book)	1913	Poems
Sheikh Sanan	1914	Tragedy
Sheyda	1916	Drama
Bahar Şəbnəmləri (Spring dews)(book)	1917 (includes the poems written in 1905-1916)	Poems
Uçurum (Abyss)	1917	Tragedy
İblis (The Devil)	1918	Tragedy

=== Works of Huseyn Javid during Soviet period ===
Name	Year	Genre
Peyğəmbər (Prophet)	1922	Drama
Afat	1922	Tragedy
Topal Teymur (Tamerlane)	1925	Drama
Knyaz	1929	Tragedy
Siyavush	1933	Tragedy
Shahla	1934	Play
Khayyam	1935	Tragedy
İblisin intiqamı (The Revenge of the Devil)	1936	Play

== Family members ==
Mushkunaz Javid (wife) was born in 1902 in Nakhchivan. She died in 1976. His son was Artogrul Javid (1919) was born in Baku. He studied at Azerbaijan Pedagogical University (1940). In 1941–1942, he studied at Azerbaijan Conservatorium. Uzeyir Hajibeyov was his teacher. Artogrul devoted his first work – “9 Lariasiya” to his teacher. He died in 1943. Artogrul's grave is situated next to his parents in Nakhchivan.

== Memorial museum of Huseyn Javid ==
In 1981, the Azerbaijan Communist Party decided the establishment of memorial museums of Huseyn Javid in Baku and Nakhchivan for the “100 years anniversary of Huseyn Javid”. This initiation was realized in 1995 by the order of Heydar Aliyev. The area of the home museum in Baku is 245 m^{2}. In exposition of the home museum of Huseyn Javid, there are more than 600 exhibits which includes his and his family's personal belonging, his publications and works, photos etc.

The home museum of Huseyn Javid was opened in 1984 in Alixan street, where Javid was born. There are about 6000 exhibits. Besides preserving personal belongings and writings of Huseyn Javid, the museum researches his works.

== Huseyn Javid Mausoleum ==
The mausoleum was built on his grave in 1996, for the 114th anniversary of Huseyn Javid. The architect was Rasim Aliyev. Heydar Aliyev participated in the opening ceremony.

== See also ==
- House-Museum and Memorial Complex of Huseyn Javid
- ANAS House-Museum of Huseyn Javid
