= Mirzaagha Aliyev =

Azerbaijani actor

- Mirzəağa Əliyev
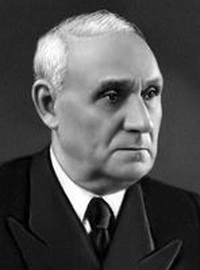
- Born: 1883; Hövsan, Caucasus Viceroyalty, Russian Empire (present-day Azerbaijan)
- Died: October 25, 1954 (aged 70–71); Baku, Azerbaijani SSR, Soviet Union

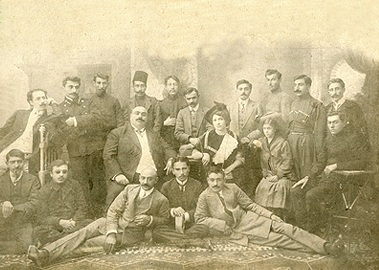
Aliyev and Govhar Gaziyeva with the actors of Erivan theatre in 1911

Mirza Ali oghlu Aliyev (1883 – October 25, 1954) was an Azerbaijani actor. People's Artist of the USSR (1949). He won two Stalin Prizes in the second degree (1943, 1948).

== Personal life ==
He was briefly married to actress Govhar Gaziyeva.

== See also ==
- List of People's Artistes of the Azerbaijan SSR
