= Huseyn Arablinski =

Azerbaijani actor

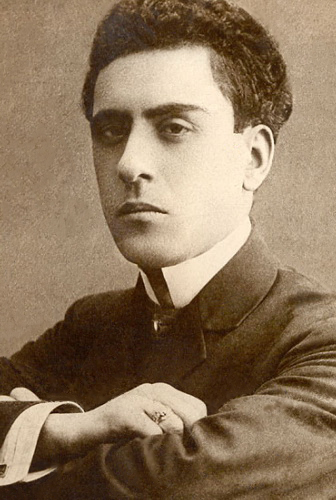
Huseyn Arablinski

Huseyn Arablinski (Azerbaijani: Hüseyn Ərəblinski), born Huseynbala Mammad oghlu Khalafov (1881, Baku – 17 March 1919, Baku), was an Azerbaijani actor.

== Life and career ==
Born to a poor family, Huseyn Arablinski lost his father at a young age. He was sent by his mother to a religious school. Soon not being able to pay for it, young Huseyn had to drop out. However, with the help of Habib bey Mahmudbeyov, a local teacher who made it possible for children from poor families to attend school, Arablinski was admitted to the 3rd Russian-Muslim School. Mahmudbeyov was also the one who roused young Arablinski's interest in acting. One of the theatres agreed to have Mahmudbeyov's students act out incidental and minor characters. Despite scrupulous preparation, Arablinskis first performance was unsuccessful. In 1897–1900 he continued to act in small roles.

Arablinski's real talent was revealed in 1905, when a troupe of Azeri actors, of which he was a member, was going on a tour to the city of Lankaran to perform the play Musibat-i Fakhraddin ("Fakhraddin's Tragedy") by Najaf bey Vazirov. It was soon reported that the actor for the main role had fallen ill and could not attend the rehearsals. The role was given to the 24-year-old Arablinski, who made an outstanding performance, and in the following years was often chosen for that role. His other stage roles Shah (Agha Mohammad Khan Qajar by A.Hagverdiyev), Khlestakov (The Government Inspector by N.Gogol), Heydar bey (Haji Gara by M.F.Akhundov), Othello (Othello by W.Shakespeare), etc. The stage name Arablinski was in fact the surname of one of the young females in the audience. The actor fell in love with her during the troupe's tour to Derbent in 1906, when she met him shortly after the play to express her admiration of his talent.

Beginning in 1907, Huseyn Arablinski worked as a stage director. In 1916 he starred in the silent movie V tsarstve nefti i millionov ("In the Realm of Oil and Millions", dir. Boris Svetlov) as Lutfali bey.

== Death ==
In the Soviet publications Arablinski's murder was usually blamed on the government of the short-lived Azerbaijan Democratic Republic. However, in reality, the actor was killed by his cousin motivated by personal issues. Arablinski's deeply religious family was never in favour of his career choice. Their relationship became even more strained when Huseyn shaved his moustache to facilitate his stage performance as female characters.

== Legacy ==
The Sumgayit State Musical Drama Theater was named after Arablinski.
