= Azerbaijan State Academic National Drama Theatre =

Coordinates: 40.3953°N 49.8822°E

Azerbaijan State Academic Drama Theatre
- Azərbaycan Akademik Milli Dram Teatrı
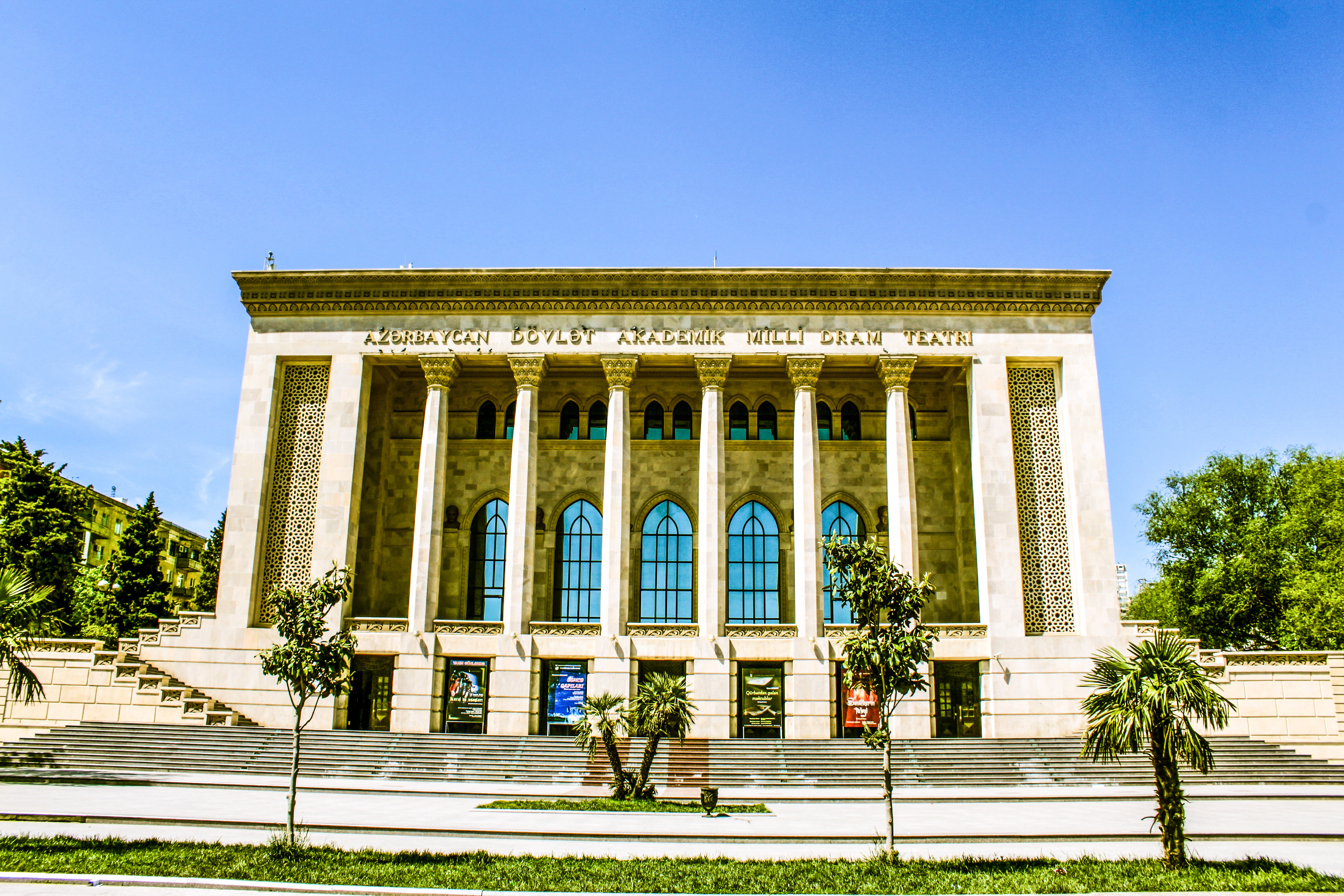
- Interactive map of the Azerbaijan State Academic Drama Theatre area

General information
- Type: Theatre
- Location: Baku, Azerbaijan
- Completed: 1919

The Azerbaijan State Academic Drama Theatre (Azerbaijani: Azərbaycan Akademik Milli Dram Teatrı) is an academic theatre of drama in Baku, Azerbaijan.

== History of the theatre ==
The theatre has its origins in national holidays and dances. Elements of theatricality were contained in many kinds of national creativity accompanying national festivities, traditional holidays and other occasions. On 10 March 1873, under the guidance of Hasan bey Zardabi and with the participation of students of the Real School of Baku, comedy "Vizier of Lankaran khanate" by M.F.Akhundov's was staged. The professional Azerbaijani theatre was originated after this very performance. In 1919, separated troupes joined up, and the theatre acquired the state recognition.

Then Azerbaijan Dramatic Theatre had different names in different years-"State Theatre", "United State Theatre", "Azerbaijani Turkic Drama Theatre" and others. Through 1923–1933, the theatre was named after Dadash Bunyatzade, but in 1933–1991, it was named after Meshadi Azizbekov. In 1991, the theatre was renamed to the "Azerbaijan State Academic Drama Theatre".

== Activity ==
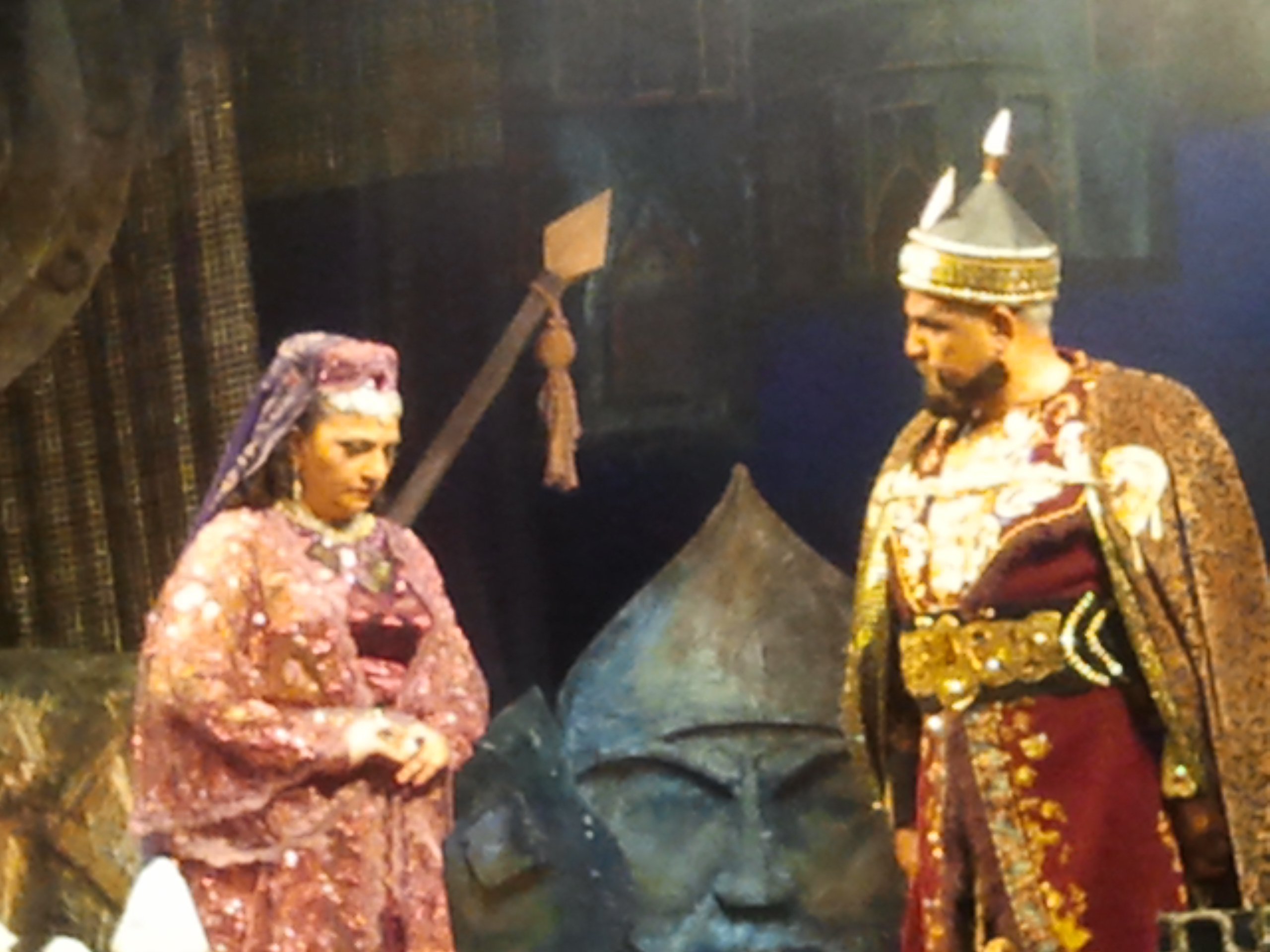
Amir Teymur (Spectacle of Azerbaijan State Academic Drama Theatre). Directed by Mehriban Alakbarzadeh

During the Soviet period, the theatre was awarded many awards of the USSR for successful activity. Such actors as Huseyn Arablinski, Mukhtar Dadashev, Jahangir Zeynalov, Mirzaagha Aliyev, Sidgi Ruhulla, Alasgar Alakbarov, Adil Isgenderov, Barat Shekinskaya, Leyla Badirbeyli and other famous actors played at the theater during its activity period. Plays to works of Jafar Jabbarli, Mirza Fatali Akhundov, Ali bey Huseynzade, Najaf bey Vazirov, Huseyn Javid, Sabit Rahman, Nariman Narimanov, Ilyas Efediyev, also to works of other world classics such as Shakespeare, Schiller, Molière, Dumas, Hugo, Balzac, Pushkin, Lermontov, Tolstoy, Gogol were staged in the theatre.

The troupe of the theatre was repeatedly on tours, to: Moscow, Saint Petersburg, Kazan, Tbilisi, Tashkent, Ashgabat, Turkey, Germany and Cyprus. Some performances were awarded state grants of the USSR and Azerbaijan.

== Troupe ==
People's actors

•Sayavush Aslan

•Yashar Nuri

•Nureddin Guliyev

•Basti Bekirova

•Firangiz Mutallimova

•Rafael Dadashov

•Ilham Alesgerov

•Zarnigar Atakishiyeva

•Telman Adigozalov

•Meleyke Esedova and others

Honoured actors

•Asger Mamedoglu

•Sabir Mamedov

•Jafar Namig Kamal

•Sadig Imanov

•Saida Guliyeva

•Parviz Bagirov and others

Chief director

•Merahim Farzalibeyov
