= Treatise =

Formal and systematic written discourse on some subject

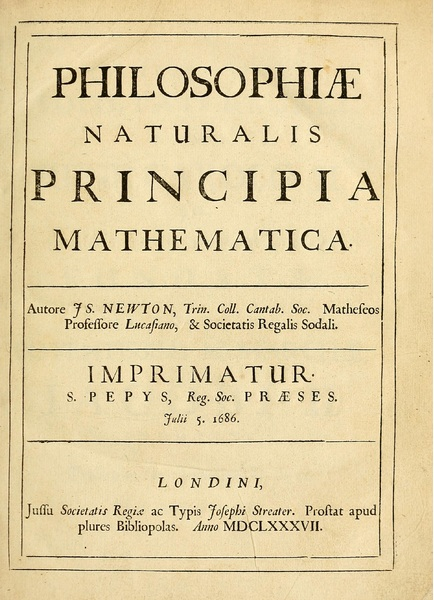
Title page of Sir Isaac Newton's Mathematical Principles of Natural Philosophy (1687)

A treatise is a formal and systematic written discourse on some subjects concerned with investigating or exposing the main principles of the subject and its conclusions. A monograph is a treatise on a specialized topic.

== Etymology ==
The word "treatise" originated in the early 14th century. It is derived from the Anglo-French term tretiz, which itself comes from the Old French traitis, meaning "treatise" or "account." This in turn was derived from the verb traitier, which means "to deal with" or "to set forth in speech or writing".

The etymological lineage can be traced further back to the Latin word tractatus, which is a form of the verb tractare, meaning "to drag about" or "to deal with".

== Historically significant treatises ==
=== Table ===
The works presented here have been identified as influential by scholars on the development of human civilization.

Title	Author	Year of first edition	Subject	Influence reference
The Art of War	Sun Tzu	~500BCE	War	Reference
The Elements	Euclid	~300BCE	Mathematics	Reference
Arthashastra	Kautilya	~200BCE	Statecraft	Reference
De architectura	Vitruvius	~30BCE	Architecture	Reference
Almagest	Claudius Ptolemaeus	200s	Astronomy	Reference
The Book of Pastoral Rule	Pope Gregory I	590	Ethics	Reference
Vivekacūḍāmaṇi	Adi Shankara	700s	Philosophy	Reference
First Grammatical Treatise	Anonymous	1200s	Linguistics	
De re aedificatoria	Leon Battista Alberti	1485	Architecture	Reference
The Prince	Niccolò Machiavelli	1532	Politics	Reference
De revolutionibus orbium coelestium	Nicolaus Copernicus	1543	Astronomy	Reference
Discourse on the Method	René Descartes	1637	Philosophy	Reference
La Géométrie	René Descartes	1637	Mathematics	Reference
Two Treatises of Government	John Locke	1660	Government	Reference
Philosophiæ Naturalis Principia Mathematica	Isaac Newton	1687	Physics	
Treatise on Light	Christiaan Huygens	1690	Physics	
Opticks	Isaac Newton	1704	Physics	Reference
Principles of Human Knowledge	George Berkeley	1710	Philosophy	
A Treatise of Human Nature	David Hume	1739	Philosophy	
Introductio in analysin infinitorum	Leonhard Euler	1748	Mathematics	
The Wealth of Nations	Adam Smith	1776	Political Economy	Reference
Treatise on Instrumentation	Hector Berlioz	1844	Music	
Gray's Anatomy	Henry Gray	1858	Biology	
On the Origin of Species	Charles Darwin	1859	Biology	Reference
The Letters of Kamal-ud-Dawla	Mirza Fatali Akhundov	1865	Philosophy	Reference
Das Kapital	Karl Marx	1867	Political Economy	Reference
A Treatise on Electricity and Magnetism	James Clerk Maxwell	1873	Physics	Reference
The Principles of Quantum Mechanics	Paul Dirac	1930	Physics	Reference
The General Theory of Employment, Interest and Money	John Maynard Keynes	1936	Economics	Reference
Theory of Games and Economic Behavior	John von Neumann, Oskar Morgenstern	1944	Economics	

=== Discussion ===
==== Euclid's Elements ====
Euclid's Elements has appeared in more editions than any other books except the Bible and is one of the most important mathematical treatises ever. It has been translated to numerous languages and remains continuously in print since the beginning of printing. Before the invention of the printing press, it was manually copied and widely circulated. When scholars recognized its excellence, they removed inferior works from circulation in its favor. Many subsequent authors, such as Theon of Alexandria, made their own editions, with alterations, comments, and new theorems or lemmas. Many mathematicians were influenced and inspired by Euclid's masterpiece. For example, Archimedes of Syracuse and Apollonius of Perga, the greatest mathematicians of their time, received their training from Euclid's students and his Elements and were able to solve many open problems at the time of Euclid. It is a prime example of how to write a text in pure mathematics, featuring simple and logical axioms, precise definitions, clearly stated theorems, and logical deductive proofs. The Elements consists of thirteen books dealing with geometry (including the geometry of three-dimensional objects such as polyhedra), number theory, and the theory of proportions. It was essentially a compilation of all mathematics known to the Greeks up until Euclid's time.

==== Maxwell's Treatise ====
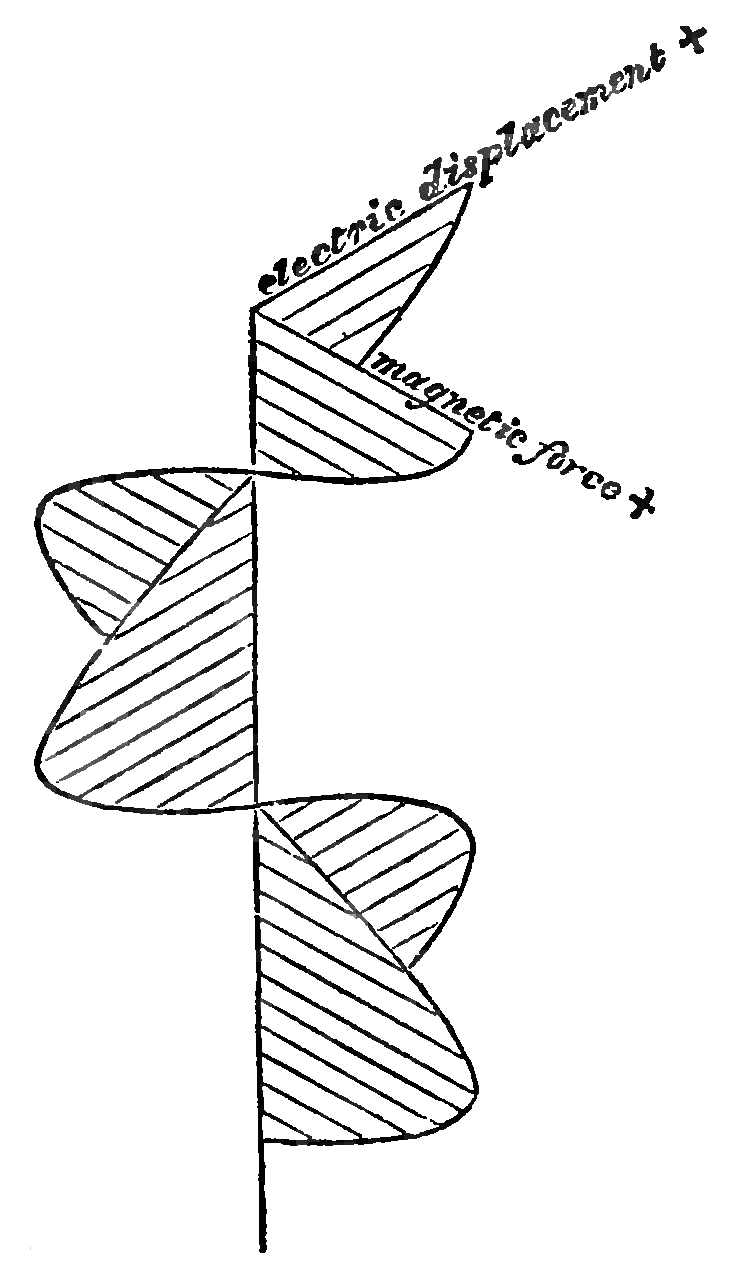
Fig. 66 in Volume 2 is an illustration of an electromagnetic wave

Drawing on the work of his predecessors, especially the experimental research of Michael Faraday, the analogy with heat flow by William Thomson (later Lord Kelvin) and the mathematical analysis of George Green, James Clerk Maxwell synthesized all that was known about electricity and magnetism into a single mathematical framework, Maxwell's equations. Originally, there were 20 equations in total. In his Treatise on Electricity and Magnetism (1873), Maxwell reduced them to eight. Maxwell used his equations to predict the existence of electromagnetic waves, which travel at the speed of light. In other words, light is but one kind of electromagnetic wave. Maxwell's theory predicted there ought to be other types, with different frequencies. After some ingenious experiments, Maxwell's prediction was confirmed by Heinrich Hertz. In the process, Hertz generated and detected what are now called radio waves and built crude radio antennas and the predecessors of satellite dishes. Hendrik Lorentz derived, using suitable boundary conditions, Fresnel's equations for the reflection and transmission of light in different media from Maxwell's equations. He also showed that Maxwell's theory succeeded in illuminating the phenomenon of light dispersion where other models failed. John William Strutt (Lord Rayleigh) and Josiah Willard Gibbs then proved that the optical equations derived from Maxwell's theory are the only self-consistent description of the reflection, refraction, and dispersion of light consistent with experimental results. Optics thus found a new foundation in electromagnetism.

The science of electromagnetism has made it possible to develop new technologies that have since become commonplace. One such example is Wireless communication, which did not require long and expensive cables and was faster than even the telegraph. Guglielmo Marconi adapted Hertz's equipment for this purpose in the 1890s. He achieved the first international wireless transmission between England and France in 1900 and by the following year, he succeeded in sending messages in Morse code across the Atlantic. Seeing its value, the shipping industry adopted this technology at once. Radio broadcasting became extremely popular in the twentieth century and remains in common use in the early twenty-first.

After contemplating Maxwell's Treatise, Gibbs and Oliver Heaviside independently sought to develop a new set of mathematical methods for physics and engineering known as vector calculus to replace the theory of quaternions, in vogue at the time but not ideal for describing electromagnetic phenomena. The modern notations for the vector cross and dot products were invented by Gibbs, whereas the idea of using bold letters to denote vectors came from Heaviside. But it was Maxwell himself who began the process of modernizing his own equations by identifying and naming some of the key vector operations, such as the "curl" and the "convergence" (or negative divergence) of a vector field, and the "slope" (or gradient) of a scalar field. Gibbs' lecture notes were later developed into a textbook, Vector Analysis (1901), by one of his students, Edwin Bidwell Wilson, and the subject itself has been applied to phenomena other than those of electricity and magnetism. On the other hand, Heaviside was largely responsible for shaping how people understood and applied Maxwell's work for decades to come. He wrote Maxwell's equations in the form familiar today, just four equations. He also made considerable progress in electrical telegraphy, telephony, and the study of the propagation of electromagnetic waves. Furthermore, the "operational calculus" employed by Heaviside in his work on electromagnetism and electrical engineering attracted much attention in the early twentieth century and was ultimately developed into the modern theory of the Laplace transform, now of ubiquitous usage and a standard part of the undergraduate curricula for the mathematical sciences and engineering.

One of Maxwell's guiding principles was that electromagnetic phenomena could be explained in terms of mechanical processes involving the stationary luminiferous ether, a hypothetical medium through which light travels, and this was how physicists initially interpreted the results of Hertz's experiments. However, the 1887 experiment of Albert Michelson and Edward Morley found no evidence for the Earth's motion through the ether. George Francis FitzGerald and Lorentz independently explained the Michelson–Morley experiment by proposing the contraction of objects as they move, a major step towards Albert Einstein's special theory of relativity. With special relativity, Einstein not only explained the FitzGerald–Lorentz contraction but also discarded the ether altogether.

But while Heaviside sought to banish potential functions from the theory, Maxwell's decision to keep them proved prescient. As Richard Feynman indicated in a 1964 lecture, "In the general theory of quantum electrodynamics, one takes the vector and scalar potentials as fundamental quantities."

== See also ==
- Compilation thesis
- Edited volume
- Legal treatise
- Tractate
- Tractatus
- Thesis (Dissertation)
- Academic publishing
- Collection of articles
