= The story of Monsieur Jourdan, a botanist and the dervish Mastalishah, a famous sorcerer =

Play by Mirza Fatali Akhundov

The story of Monsieur Jourdan, a botanist and the dervish Mastalishah, a famous sorcerer Azerbaijani: Hekayəti Müsyo Jordan həkimi nəbatat və Dərviş Məstəli şah cadukuni-məşhur
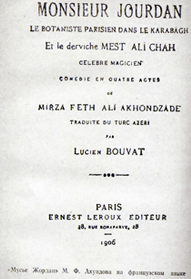
- Title page of the 1906 Paris edition
- Original language: Azerbaijani
- Written by: Mirza Fatali Akhundov
- Genre: comedy

Premiere
- Date: 1851

“The story of Monsieur Jourdan, a botanist and the dervish Mastalishah, a famous sorcerer” (Azerbaijani: Hekayəti Müsyo Jordan həkimi nəbatat və Dərviş Məstəli şah cadukuni-məşhur) the second comedy in four acts by the Azerbaijani writer and playwright Mirza Fatali Akhundov, written in 1850 in the Azerbaijani language. It is noted that the comedy was directed against the medieval feudal ideology, against superstitions. Translated by the author into Russian, it was published in 1851 in the Kavkaz newspaper. The first production on the Russian stage, in the author's own translation, took place in the same year in St. Petersburg. The play was staged in Tiflis in 1852, and in Nakhchivan in 1883.

Monsieur Jourdan's prototype was the French natural scientist Claude Thomas Alexis Jordan (1814-1897), who actually came to Transcaucasia for scientific studies and researched, in particular, the flora of Karabakh, where the comedy is set. It is even assumed that M. F. Akhundov was personally acquainted with the French scientist and talked with him, which helped him to create the artistic image of the scientist. It is noted that in his work M. F. Akhundov provides true data about the scientific activities of Alexis Jourdan and the amendments he made to the classification of the plants.

== Plot ==
The action takes place in Karabakh in 1848. The French botanist, member of the Royal Academy, Jourdan comes here to study the local plant species. He is visiting the ruler of the Tekle-Muganly nomad camp, Hatamkhan-agi. His nephew, the young Shahbaz, is attracted by Jourdan's stories about Paris and is going to go there together with Jourdan to study sciences. However his fiancée, Sharafnis, and the aunt, Shahrabanu-khanum, do not want this. To hinder the trip, they resort to the help of the famous dervish Mastali, who came from Iran. For a hundred ducats, which Mastali got from the naive and superstitious women, he begins to destroy the capital of France. Mastali casts terrible spells, summons spirits and devils and gives them the order to destroy Paris with one blow, just as he destroys its image. Dervish rushes to the planks spread on the floor, depicting a sinful city, and with one strong blow shatters them to smithereens. Suddenly there was a strong knock at the door and Monsieur Jourdan, who entered in excitement, announced that Paris was destroyed and that he must immediately return to France. The women were frightened by the quick execution of Mastali's magical actions. Even the dervish himself, in fear of what he had done, hides behind a curtain so that no one would find him. And to the question of Hatamkhan who came running: "Who ruined Paris?" Jourdan replies: "Devils!... Satan!... Villains!" Women have no doubts that Paris was destroyed by the dervish Mastali. In fact, there was a revolution in Paris, and the king fled. Frightened by this, Jourdan must immediately leave Karabakh. He leaves, but Shahbaz remains. Women triumph.

== Screen adaptation ==
In 1976, at the Azerbaijanfilm studio, based on the comedy directed by Shamil Mahmudbeyov and Kamil Rustambeyov, the movie “The Darvish Detonates Paris” was shot. Monsieur Jourdan was played by the Honoured Artist of the RSFSR Sergei Yursky, the dervish was played by the Honoured Artist of the Azerbaijan SSR Mirza Babayev. The People's Artist of the USSR Adil Isgandarov (Hatamkhan-agha), People's Artist of the Azerbaijan SSR Leyla Badirbeyli (Shahrabanu-khanum), Hasanagha Turabov (Rashid-bey) and others also starred in the film.

== See also ==
- Hekayati Molla Ibrahim-Khalil Kimyagar
