= Racism in Iran =

Racism in Iran encompasses various manifestations of racism between the inhabitants of the country. A UN panel in 2019 said "Arabs, Kurds, and other minorities in Iran face discrimination because of their ethnicity." In 2010, The Committee on the Elimination of Racial Discrimination (CERD) of the UN urged Iran to tackle racism against Arab, Azeri, Balochi, and Kurdish communities and some communities of non-citizens. Iran has been found by groups like CERD, Human Rights Watch, and Amnesty International to be marginalizing and discriminating against people of non-Persian ethnicity via government crackdowns on dissent and hampering access to health and housing services, with ethnic Persians dominating the central government of Iran.

== Arabs ==
Epithets such as Mush-Khor (lit. 'rodent eaters' in Persian) and Marmulak-Khor (lit. 'lizard eaters') are used for both Sunni and Shiite Arabs.

== Azerbaijanis ==
In 1926, the Azerbaijani language became prohibited in Iran for the first time. The head of the state at the time, Reza Shah appointed Dr. Mohseni as the chair of the "Cultural Office of Azerbaijan", who was infamous for his order:

Put donkey reins on whoever dares to speak Turkish in the classroom and throw them in the stable amongst the donkeys.

Tork-e Khar is a phrase traditionally used for Azerbaijanis and Turks, literally meaning the "Turk donkey".

== Afghans ==
The word "Afghani" or "Noonkhoshk" is used for Afghan People. Noonkhoshk means 'Dry bread' And Afghani is a term used to mock an Afghan person.

== See also ==
- Iranian nationalism

== Bibliography ==
- Asgharzadeh, Alireza (11 June 2007). Iran and the Challenge of Diversity: Islamic Fundamentalism, Aryanist Racism, and Democratic Struggles. Palgrave Macmillan US.
- Hagigat, Moshe-hay S.; Rezaei, Farhad; Rhode, Harold; Seliktar, Ofira; Zarabadi, Ladan; Zimmt, Raz (18 March 2015). Identities in Crisis in Iran: Politics, Culture, and Religion. Lexington Books.
- Zia-Ebrahimi, Reza (2016). The Emergence of Iranian Nationalism: Race and the Politics of Dislocation. Columbia University Press. ISBN 978-0231175760.
