= National Library of Azerbaijan =

- Azərbaycan Milli Kitabxanası
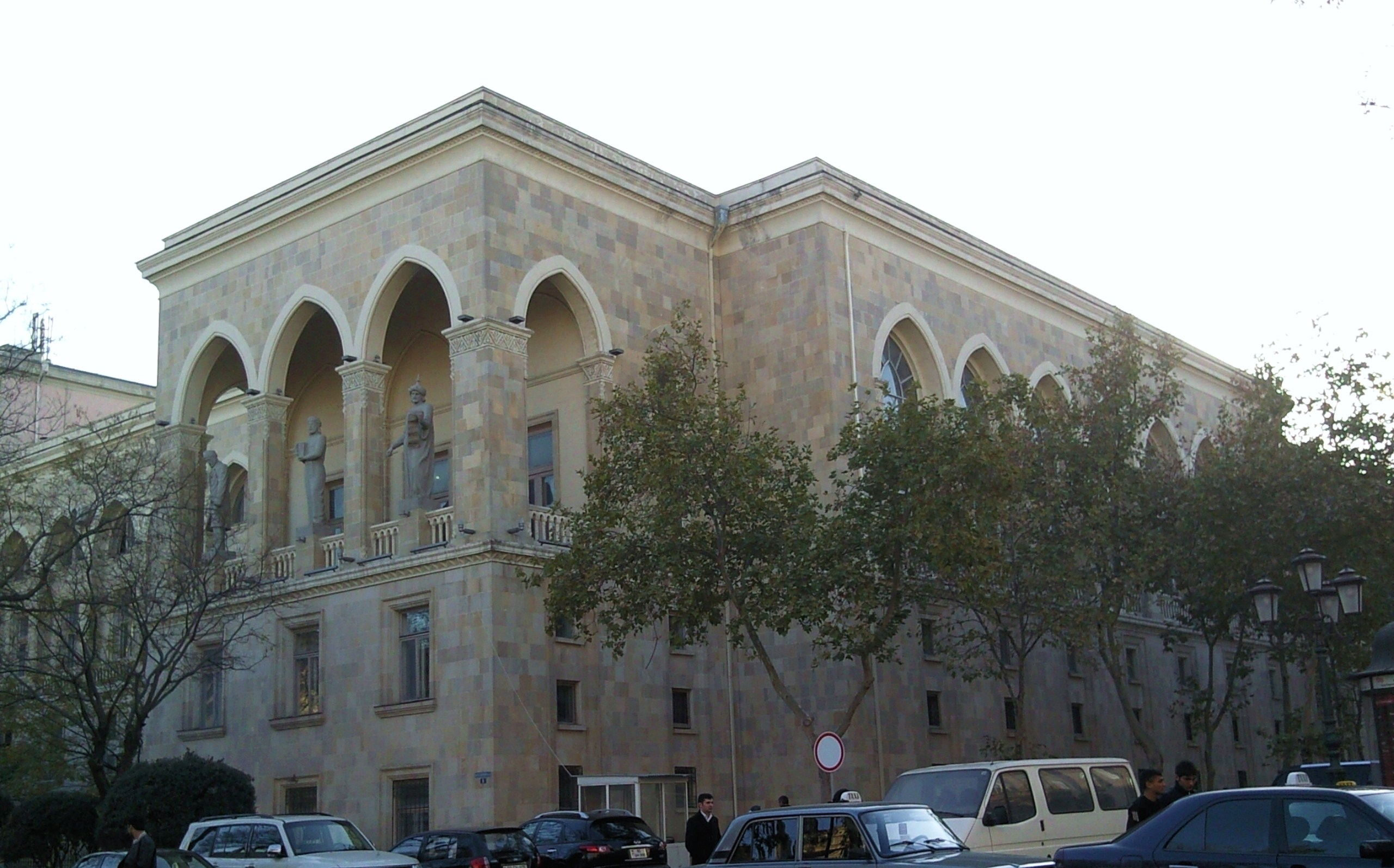
- 40°22′27″N 49°50′45″E
- Location: Baku, Azerbaijan
- Type: National library
- Established: 1923 (103 years ago)

Collection
- Items collected: Books, journals, newspapers, magazines, sound and music recordings, patents, databases, maps, stamps, prints, drawings and manuscripts
- Size: 4,513,000 items
- Legal deposit: Yes

Access and use
- Access requirements: Registration

Other information
- Employees: more than 300
- Website: ANL.az

The National Library of Azerbaijan (Azerbaijani: Azərbaycan Milli Kitabxanası), officially named the Mirza Fatali Akhundov National Library of Azerbaijan (Azerbaijani: Mirzə Fətəli Axundov adına Azərbaycan Milli Kitabxanası) after Mirza Fatali Akhundov, is the national library of the Republic of Azerbaijan, located in Baku and founded in 1923. It is named after Mirza Fatali Akhundov, an Azerbaijani dramatist and philosopher, the author of numerous dramatic works that laid the foundation for dramaturgy in Azerbaijan and the creator of "The Letters of Kamal-ud-Dawla", his greatest literary-philosophical treatise. The library is located on Khagani Street and overlooks Rashid Behbudov Avenue and Nizami Street. Its façades feature the statues of various writers and poets: Nizami Ganjavi, Mahsati, Uzeyir Hajibeyov, Shota Rustaveli, Alexander Pushkin and several others.

A vast, eight-stage repository occupies the four floors of the building and is equipped with special elevators, which deliver the books to the outlets. The capacity of the reading rooms is 500 seats. Orders are also accepted by e-mail upon electronic registration.

The library includes 25 sections and 26 sectors. The fund of the library covers approximately 4,513,000 publishing materials.

== History ==
Library facade

The Azerbaijan National Library (ANL) founded on May 23, 1923. The building was designed by Azerbaijani architect Mikayil Huseynov. It was initially known as the "General Library and State Book Storage" of Azerbaijan. On July 11, 1939, the library gained its present name. In 1962, the library was finally granted permission to create exchange ties with the Bibliothèque nationale de France. In 2004, by the decision of the Cabinet of Ministers, the library was given the status of "National Library". In 2005, it joined the Conference of European National Librarians, which includes 54 libraries in Europe.

In 2005, the Department for Foreign Literature was established to participate in international book exchanging and to cooperate with relevant departments of foreign libraries, as well as the organizations operating in the field of library. The department cooperates with more than 60 countries including Jordan, Egypt, Russia, Sweden, Estonia, Georgia, etc.

In 2000, the National Library named after M.F. Akhundov established an internet hall. In 2001, a training center was opened by the library. It uses an automated management system since 2003.

In 2023, the 100th birthday of the National Library was celebrated.

== Present day ==
Today, the building houses books, journals, newspapers, magazines, sound and music recordings, patents, databases, maps, stamps, prints, drawings and manuscripts, including copies of all the newspapers published during the Soviet period.

The National Library of Azerbaijan is also the official and central repository of the country. It receives four copies of every new book and two copies of every magazine and newspaper published in Azerbaijan.

The library, the only one of its kind in the country, has microfilm and photos of newspapers published in Azerbaijan before the Bolshevik Revolution.

== Usage of the National Library ==
Citizens of Azerbaijan, as well as citizens from other countries, who have reader card may use the library free of charge. But some services such as scan of the documents, photocopy, ordering book from other/foreign libraries are payable.

Any Azerbaijani and foreign citizen may get a reader card by submitting their identification documents such as IDs or passports and driving license. The reader card is given to all user groups for once use. Usage of reader card not belonging to you is forbidden. Library items are given to the readers by control paper, which is filled in by the reader at the control point.

Entering the library halls with mobile phones in general mode, outdoor clothes and cameras, as well as with big bags is forbidden. The library allows the readers to use their personal laptops. But plugging flash drives and discs into the computers of the library is also forbidden.

It is strictly forbidden to photocopy the documents protected in the Rare Books Fund and museum of the library, the archives of the Azerbaijan Literature Department and the newspapers printed in the newspaper fund, and the manuscripts of the Notaries and Fonts Department. Photocopies of these literatures are only permitted by the department for organization of electronic resources. It is forbidden to take literature from the Rare Books Fund and the Azerbaijan Literature Archive Fund.

== Reading halls ==
Library foyer

Every citizen of Azerbaijan/ other countries with a reader card can use the periodical press hall. Four-year magazines (125 in Azerbaijani and 20 in Russian) and five-year newspapers (236 in Azerbaijani and 22 in Russian) in the hall which has 67 seats.

Exhibition hall has been established to hold literary events, book presentations, meetings with authors, and exhibitions. All the events are open to all users.

There are 1,869 items, including 757 in Azerbaijani and 1,112 in Russian in the reading hall for exact and technical sciences. The readers may request books from the basic book collections.

Approximately 2,500 copies of magazines and newspapers in various languages are stored in foreign language hall with 20 seats for users. The hall has been provided with alphabetical catalogs of the books in different languages.

The rare books, as well as the books about Azerbaijan covering the period until 1920 are stored in the rare book and library museum.

Humanitarian sciences hall with 36 seats introduces 4,237 items (2,072 in Azerbaijani and 2,165 in Russian) and provides the users with alphabetical and systematic catalogs.

The Students hall rendering services especially to higher school students and the young is up to 250 seats. Approximately 9,500 items (in the Azerbaijani and Russian languages) including encyclopedias, guidebooks, dictionaries, etc. and covering different fields of science are in the use of the readers in the hall provided with alphabetical and systematic catalogs.

16 readers can use the music publication hall at the same time. There are sound records, copies of Azerbaijani and foreign compositions, copies of music handwritings and draft theatrical plays of Azerbaijani composers and playwrights, as well as copies of music books in different languages stored in the hall.

== The National Library's international relations ==
- A Memorandum of cooperation in the field of the library was signed between the national library of Azerbaijan and national library of Estonia on June 6, 2010.
- The National Library of Azerbaijan signed a memorandum of understanding on cooperation with the Swiss National Library on May 4, 2011.
- The National Parliamentary Library of Georgia signed a memorandum on mutual relations with national library of Azerbaijan on 20 December 20013.
- A memorandum of understanding on mutual cooperation was signed between the National Library of Azerbaijan and the St. St. Cyril and Methodius National Library of Bulgaria on April 17, 2015.
- Partnership Agreement regarding Partnership in the European Library was signed by the National Library of Azerbaijan and the Foundation of Dutch Law on Stitching Conference of European National Librarians on May 2, 2016
- A Memorandums on cooperating in the field of libraries was signed between national libraries of Azerbaijan, Russia and Egypt on September 29, 2017.
- National Library named after M.F.Akhundov signed a memorandum on cooperation with the Austrian National Library.
- A memorandum of understanding was signed between the National Library of Azerbaijan and the Qatar National Library on April 17, 2018.
- A Memorandum on cooperation in the field of libraries was signed between the National Library of Azerbaijan and the National Library of Belarus .
- A Memorandum on cooperating was signed between the Azerbaijan National Library and the National Library of Morocco on April 7, 2015.
- A memorandum of understanding was signed between the National Library of Azerbaijan and the Regents of the University of California, on behalf of its Los Angeles Campus (UCLA) on January 9, 2018.

== See also ==
- Sabir Central City Library
