= Hekayati-Molla Ibrahim-Khalil Kimyagar =

1851 play written by Mirza Fatali Akhundov

Hekayati Molla Ibrahim-Khalil Kimyagar
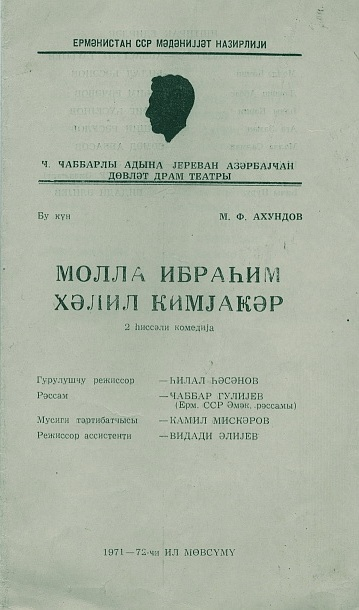
- The poster of the play at the Yerevan Azerbaijan Theatre
- Written by: Mirza Fatali Akhundov
- Original language: Azerbaijani
- Genre: Comedy

Premiere
- Date premiered: 1851

Hekayati Molla Ibrahim-Khalil Kimyagar (Azerbaijani: Hekayəti-Molla İbrahim Xəlil kimyagər, lit. 'The Story of Mullah Ibrahim-Khalil the Chemist') is the first comedy of the Azerbaijani writer and playwright Mirza Fatali Akhundov, written in 1850 in the Azerbaijani language.

According to Aziz Sharif, the comedy ridiculed the lovers of easy money - the citizens of Nukha, who believed in the alchemist's power. At the same time, Sharif notes that a positive image is also derived in the comedy - that of the poet Haji-Nuri, who considers his personal abilities and work to be the basis of a person's well-being. According to Hamid Algar, the dervish and mullah are the secondary targets of the satire in comedy, and Akhundov makes it clear in this play that he views religion as the equivalent of the superstition. Algar suggests that the Azerbaijani poet Mirza Shafi Vazeh could have been the prototype of the poet Haji-Nuri. Yashar Garaev and Fuad Gasimzade write that by creating the image of the poet Haji-Nuri in the artistic world of Akhundov, “the birth of light forces in society is also captured”.

An English translation appeared in London in 1886 by Guy Le Strange under the name The Alchemist. Another one was published in 1890 by Alexander Rogers.

== See also ==
- Eastern poem on the death of Pushkin
