= The Letters of Kamal-ud-Dawla =

Kamal-ud-Dawla
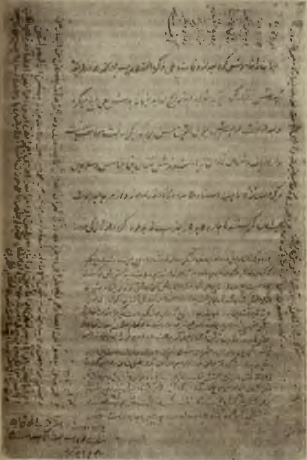
- Original title: Kəmalüddövlə məktubları
- Original language: Azerbaijani
- Written by: Mirza Fatali Akhundov
- First publication: 1924
- Genre: treatise

The Letters of Kamal-ud-Dawla (Kəmalüddövlə məktubları), also known as "Three Letters of the Indian Prince Kamal-ud-Dawla to the Persian Prince Jalal-ud-Dawla and the latter's reply — treatise by the Azerbaijani writer Mirza Fatali Akhundov, written in 1865 and considered the author's most significant critical and publicistic work. The treatise presents the correspondence between the Indian prince Kamal-ud-Dawla and the Persian prince Jalal-ud-Dawla. Through the exchange of letters — written by the Indian prince Kamal-ud-Dawla upon his return to Iran from an extended journey across Europe and America, and the replies from Jalal-ud-Dawla, who was in Cairo — the author critiques the foundations of Islamism and religious doctrines, the despotic feudal state, and Iran’s ruling aristocratic elite, while depicting scenes of Eastern despotism, the deceit and venality of the mullahs, and the poverty, disenfranchisement, ignorance, and enslavement of the people.

== Background ==
After returning from Istanbul, M.F. Akhundov again compiled a second draft of the alphabet and sent it to Tehran. In this draft, he showed the letters from right to left, fearing fanatical Iranian clerics, but the reactionary Iranian government, especially Naser al-Din Shah Qajar himself, completely ignored his ideas on this matter. In addition, he wrote a third draft on the alphabet issue and sent it to the Turkish Grand Vizier Mehmed Emin Âli Pasha. In that draft, he wrote a critique of the article by Turkish scholar Suavi about the indispensability of changing the Islamic alphabet and added to it, but in countries where Islamic ignorance prevailed, his projects could not be implemented. The writer, who was impressed by this, wrote the poem "On the New Alphabet" in Persian in 1868. In this poem, he severely criticized the ignorance-loving heads of state of Iran and Turkey.

In those years, M.F. Akhundov wrote political, social, critical and philosophical articles such as "Criticism of Mollayi-Rumi's Masnavi", "On a Single Word", "Reply to Yuma", "The Situation of the Turkish Army Around Baghdad in 1618", etc. The writer's greatest and most serious work during this period was the treatise "Letters of Kamal-ud-Dawla". The sharp criticism of religion and spirituality in this work could have posed a threat to M.F. Akhundov's life in the then environment dominated by ignorance and fanaticism. He wrote about this: "I began to write "Kamal-ud-Dawla" in order to destroy the foundations of this religion, to remove fanaticism, to awaken the peoples of Asia from the sleep of heedlessness and ignorance, and to prove the necessity of Protestantism in Islam."

"Letters of Kamal-ud-Dawla" were written in Azerbaijani; subsequently, they were translated by the author himself into Persian and Russian. It proved impossible to publish the "Letters" during Akhundov's lifetime. They were first published (in part) only in 1924 in Baku by the Committee on the New Alphabet, and in full in 1938 by the Azerbaijan Branch of the Academy of Sciences of the USSR.

== Content ==
Kamal-ud-Dawla and Jalal-ud-Dawla are princes. Both were forced to emigrate to Egypt due to political persecution. Kamal-ud-Dawla's homeland, India, was ruled by the British, who had removed Kamal-ud-Dawla's father, Aurangzeb, from power and taken over the country. Jalal-ud-Dawla, however, could not stand the tyranny and oppression of the despot in his homeland, Iran, and was forced to emigrate to Egypt.

Apparently, both princes cannot come to terms with the situation prevailing in their countries, they feel sorry for the backwardness of their homelands, and they are looking for ways to escape the disaster they have suffered.

Kamal-ud-Dawla sets out on a journey, first to America, then to European countries. His journey is not simply for sightseeing or entertainment, but to learn the reasons for the backwardness of his country and people, as well as the peoples of the East, to get acquainted with the socio-political structure of advanced countries - in short, to study the main conditions for their progress. After visiting Western countries, this wise traveler, at the request of his friend Jalal-ud-Dawla, goes to his homeland, Iran.

=== Kamal-ud-Dawla's 1st letter ===
In his first letter, Kamal-ud-Dawla writes that he has returned to Iran after traveling through England, America, and Europe. He laments the plight of his fellow countrymen, reflecting on how Iran once enjoyed a prosperous state and a happy populace. He is distressed by the loss of that former happiness and grandeur, holding the Arabs responsible for this decline. He states: "The people are ignorant and unaware of global civilization." He believes that the despotic regime and the religious fanaticism of the clergy have weakened Iran. However, he clarifies that he does not consider any specific sect superior to Islam itself; rather, he favors the form of religion that enables people to attain happiness in this world. He cites examples illustrating the extent of fanaticism among Iranians.

=== Kamal-ud-Dawla's second letter ===
In his second letter, he states that he knows his writings will yield no benefit, even if they are read and understood. He urges that a solution be found to enable the people of Iran to read and write. In fact, Akhundzade himself had devised an alphabet and even presented it to the Ottoman state, though it was rejected. Here, through the voice of Kamal-ud-Dawla, Akhundzade advocates for the new alphabet he had long desired. He remarks that a despot should not rejoice at the ignorance of the Iranian people, for none of them last forever; he cites the example of Nadir, noting the well-known fate that befell such a fearsome despot. After addressing Molla Sadiq’s words, he declares that no other people hold such absurd beliefs. He then reflects on divine justice, discussing the human hope for paradise and the fear of hell. He asserts that the Arab tribes are unparalleled in fabricating lies, just as Iranians are unmatched in their willingness to believe them. Kamal-ud-Dawla counters Molla Sadiq’s falsehoods with facts drawn from various sources and draws comparisons based on both religious and scientific perspectives. Finally, he discusses the Surahs, citing evidence from them to reinforce his arguments. He knows that Jamal al-Dawla will say, "Divine wisdom is beyond questioning!" Yet, he cannot accept this; he challenges him and demands that he admit his lack of knowledge. In the work, Kamal al-Dawla’s stance is extremely sharp and uncompromising. He believes that conviction must be grounded in reason and wisdom and must be capable of explanation; otherwise, it cannot be relied upon. "The Islamic faith can endure and persist only if people grasp its essence through consciousness and understanding." Having presented various arguments from the beginning of the second letter, Kamal al-Dawla concludes by saying: "Enough is enough! How long will you pursue futile desires? The time has come to dedicate your five senses to achieving success and attaining virtue."

=== Kamal-ud-Dawla's third letter ===
In the third letter, he discusses the fables recounted by Molla Cabbar. Yet, he protests once more: "Do something, after all – embrace progress, aspire to civilization. How long will you slumber in the sleep of ignorance?" After conversing with those in Molla Cabbar’s circle, he concludes: "Oh Lord, what a strange state of affairs. The entire world has changed, the children of the world have come of age, yet the people of Iran are only just beginning to stammer." In this letter, he discusses existence – how and from what it originated. Here, too, he takes a very firm stance, arguing that if the people cannot distinguish truth from falsehood, someone will inevitably emerge every day to bring about their ruin.

=== Jamal al-Dawla's reply letter ===
Jamal al-Dawla receives all three of his letters and writes a reply. In terms just as sharp as Kamal al-Dawla’s, he asks: "Have you lost your mind? Don't you know that before Islam, Iranians were fire-worshippers?" He declares adherence to that faith a misfortune. He says: "How can you call that state of the Persian nation 'felicity'? What a pity!" He discusses Ferdowsi specifically in response to Kamal al-Dawla, who had cited the poet in his letters to justify his own position. Like Kamal al-Dawla, he labels him irreligious. He argues: "If the capacity to distinguish truth from falsehood, a philosophical nature, and compassion for the plight of humanity ran in your lineage, why then did your ancestors not embrace the hollow beliefs of the Indians?" Jamal al-Dawla enumerates the worst aspects of the Indians and exposes their most reprehensible traits. He tells him: "I told you to travel through Iran and speak with your coreligionists to lift your spirits; I did not tell you to pit our religion and sect against one another." Jamal al-Dawla maintained that if the religions and sects of others are valid, why shouldn't ours be? In the end, Jamal al-Dawla concludes: "If you were such a philosopher—and, in your own estimation, so well-versed in the highest matters of statecraft – and if you knew that despotism is a bad thing, then why didn't you impart these ideas to Aurangzeb? Had you done so, he might have acted upon them, and the English would not have come to wrest his country from him and reduce the nation to wretchedness. Our monarch may be a despot, but – thank God – he is one of our own; we have not fallen into the hands of a foreign nation like yours."

== Essence and philosophical meaning ==
The treatise "Letters of Kamal-ud-Dawla" is one of Akhundov’s most significant critical-philosophical works. In his “Letters of Kamal-ud-Dawla” Akhundov named the great French enlighteners Montesquieu and Voltaire as his teachers. Scholars of Akhundov's legacy have written that he referred to Montesquieu and Voltaire when addressing issues such as atheism, freedom, matter, and others. The common and distinctive features found in the treatises of Montesquieu and Voltaire with Akhundov's "Letters of Kamal-ud-Dawla" are the following: commonality of form and partly of content, orientation towards the people, similarity in the characters of the heroes, in the study of the state system, etc.

Akhundov emphasizes that religion and the structure of the state should serve human well-being in this world, rather than demanding suffering for the sake of the afterlife. Letters of Kamal-ud-Dawla is a trenchant philosophical and socio-political work directed against religious fanaticism, despotic rule, and societal backwardness. Mirza Fatali Akhundov set out to completely eradicate religious fanaticism and despotism in the East. He viewed his work as an uncompromising intellectual weapon capable of shattering the foundations of the blind faith that underpinned the people's submission. Due to its radical anti-religious stance, the work faced severe bans and persecution.

The treatise "Letters of Kamal-ud-Dawla" is officially recognized in the West today as one of the first and most pivotal manifestos of secularism and Enlightenment in the Muslim East; consequently, it is actively studied at English-language universities via digitized scholarly databases.

== Literature ==
- Algar, Hamid (1984). "Akhundzade". literature. I. Encyclopædia Iranica: 735–740.
