= Eastern poem on the death of Pushkin =

- by Mirza Fatali Akhundov
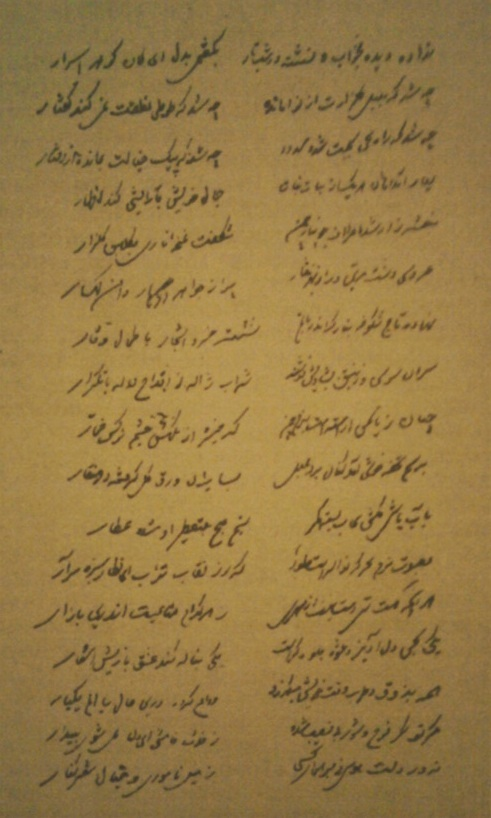
- Autograph of poem
- Translator: Mirza Fatali Akhundov
- First published in: Moskovsky Telegraph (in Russian translation)
- Country: Russian Empire
- Language: Persian
- Genre(s): Qasida
- Publication date: 1837

"Eastern poem on the death of Pushkin" is a Persian qasida (elegy) by the Azerbaijani author Mirza Fatali Akhundov, composed in 1837. This poem was his first published work. In 1837, Akhundov prepared a Russian prose translation of his poem, and his friend Alexander Bestuzhev a versified one. It was published for the first time, in Akhundov's translation, in the journal Moskovsky Telegraf. The poem was also published in the journal Moskovsky Nablyudatel, with an editorial note welcoming the poem as a tribute not merely to Pushkin but to Russian culture as a whole. Bestuzhev's translation was published in 1874 in the journal Russkaya Starina. The original version of the poem was found and published only in 1936 (translator Pavel Antokolsky).
