= Mirza Fatali Akhundov =

Iranian Azerbaijani author (1812–1878)

- میرزا فتحعلی آخوندزاده
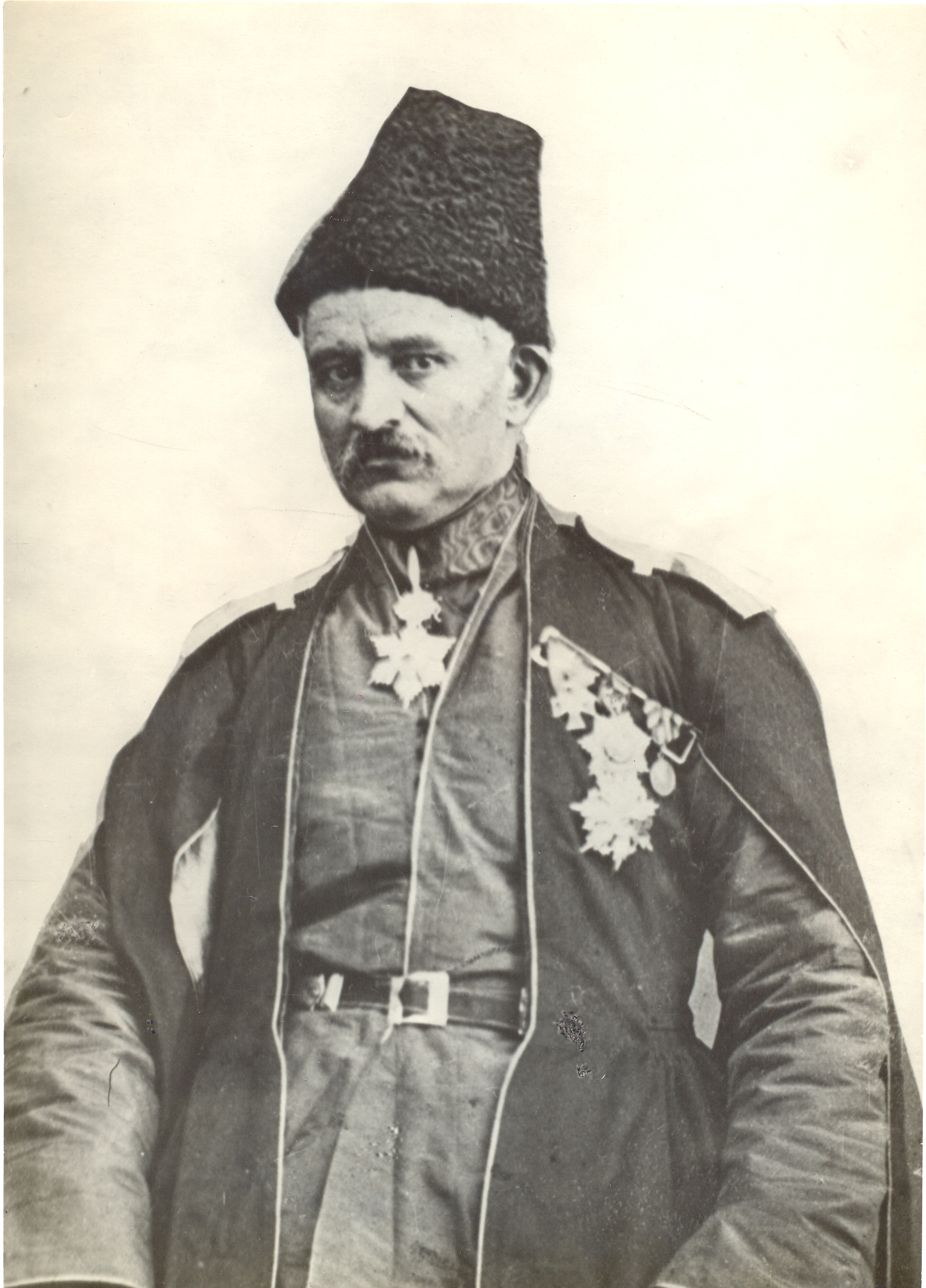
- Born: 12 July 1812; Nukha, Shaki Khanate, Qajar Iran
- Died: 9 March 1878 (aged 65); Tiflis, Tiflis Governorate, Russian Empire
- Occupations: Playwright, philosopher
- Writing career
- Language: Azerbaijani, Persian, Russian

Mirza Fatali Akhundov, (Note: Azerbaijani and Persian: میرزا فتحعلی آخوندزاده; Russian: Мирза́ Фатали́ Аху́ндов (spelled Мирза Фетъ-Али-Ахундовъ in his time).) also known as Mirza Fatali Akhundzade, or Mirza Fath-Ali Akhundzadeh (12 July 1812 – 9 March 1878), was a celebrated Iranian Azerbaijani author, playwright, atheist, philosopher, and literary critic who lived most of his life in the Russian Empire. He became famous mainly for his European-inspired plays written in Azerbaijani.

Akhundzade singlehandedly opened a new stage of development of Azerbaijani literature. Through Persian translation, his plays also played an important role in the birth of modern Iranian theater. He was also the founder of the materialist and atheist movement in the Republic of Azerbaijan and one of the forerunners of modern Iranian nationalism. He also advocated switching the Azerbaijani writing system from the Perso-Arabic script to the Latin alphabet.

According to the historian and political scientist Zaur Gasimov, the entirety of Akhundzadeh's intellectual landscape was "densely entangled with Persian thought". Akhundzadeh defined his kinsmen as Turki, but at the same time considered Iran his fatherland. Politically, he has been described as "a tsarist official of impeccable loyalty", and he viewed Russian rule as a force for modernisation in the Caucasus.

== Background and upbringing ==
Belonging to a relatively wealthy family, Akhundov was born in 1812 in the town of Nukha (present-day Shaki), which served as the capital of the Shaki Khanate. A khanate was a type of administrative unit governed by a hereditary or appointed ruler subject to Iranian rule. During the Russo-Iranian war of 1804–1813, the Shaki Khanate was occupied by the Russian Empire, who had installed Jafar Qoli Khan Donboli as their deputy.

Akhundov's grandfather, Haji Ahmad, originally lived in Rasht in northern Iran before relocating to Tabriz in northwestern Iran. His father Mirza Mohammad-Taqi had previously served as the deputy of the nearby town Khamaneh, but was dismissed by the Qajar crown prince of Iran, Abbas Mirza. Mirza Mohammad-Taqi subsequently became a merchant and relocated to Nukha, where he married Akhundov's mother Na'na Khanum in the same year. Her uncle was Akhund Haji Ali Asghar, a Shia clergyman belonging to the Moqaddam family of Maragheh. Akhundov felt a connection to the contemporary Russian poet Alexander Pushkin, due to his mother's lineage, which included an African ancestor who had served under the Iranian shah (king) Nader Shah (r. 1736–1747).

In 1813, Iran and Russia agreed to the Treaty of Gulistan, which resulted in Shaki, along with other territories, coming under Russian rule. The following year, Jafar-Qoli Khan's death led many of the province's inhabitants—who had relied on his support—to migrate elsewhere. In 1814, Akhundov was taken by his parents to Khamaneh. However, Na'na Khanum eventually became dissatisfied with living among the family of Mirza Mohammad-Taqi's first wife, and in 1818, she decided to leave Khamaneh, taking Akhundov with her. She went to Meshgin, where her uncle Haji Ali Asghar resided. This marked the last time Akhundov would see his father. Many years later, Akhundov attacked the idea of men having more than one wife as an evil and corrupting practice that not only oppressed women but also caused permanent animosity and friction between the wives and their children.

Akhundov was adopted by Haji Ali Asghar, thus becoming known as "Haji Ali Asgharoglu" or simply "Akhundzade". Haji Ali Asghar was in charge of Akhundov's early education, which included the memorization of the Quran, teaching of fiqh (Islamic jurisprudence) and Arabic and Persian literature. Akhundov first stayed in the village of Hurand with his mother and Haji Ali Asghar. When Akhundov became seven years old the following year, he was registered in a school. In 1825, Akhundov, his mother and Haji Ali Asghar briefly stayed at Nukha before moving to Ganja. Some months later, the Russo-Iranian War of 1826–1828 erupted.

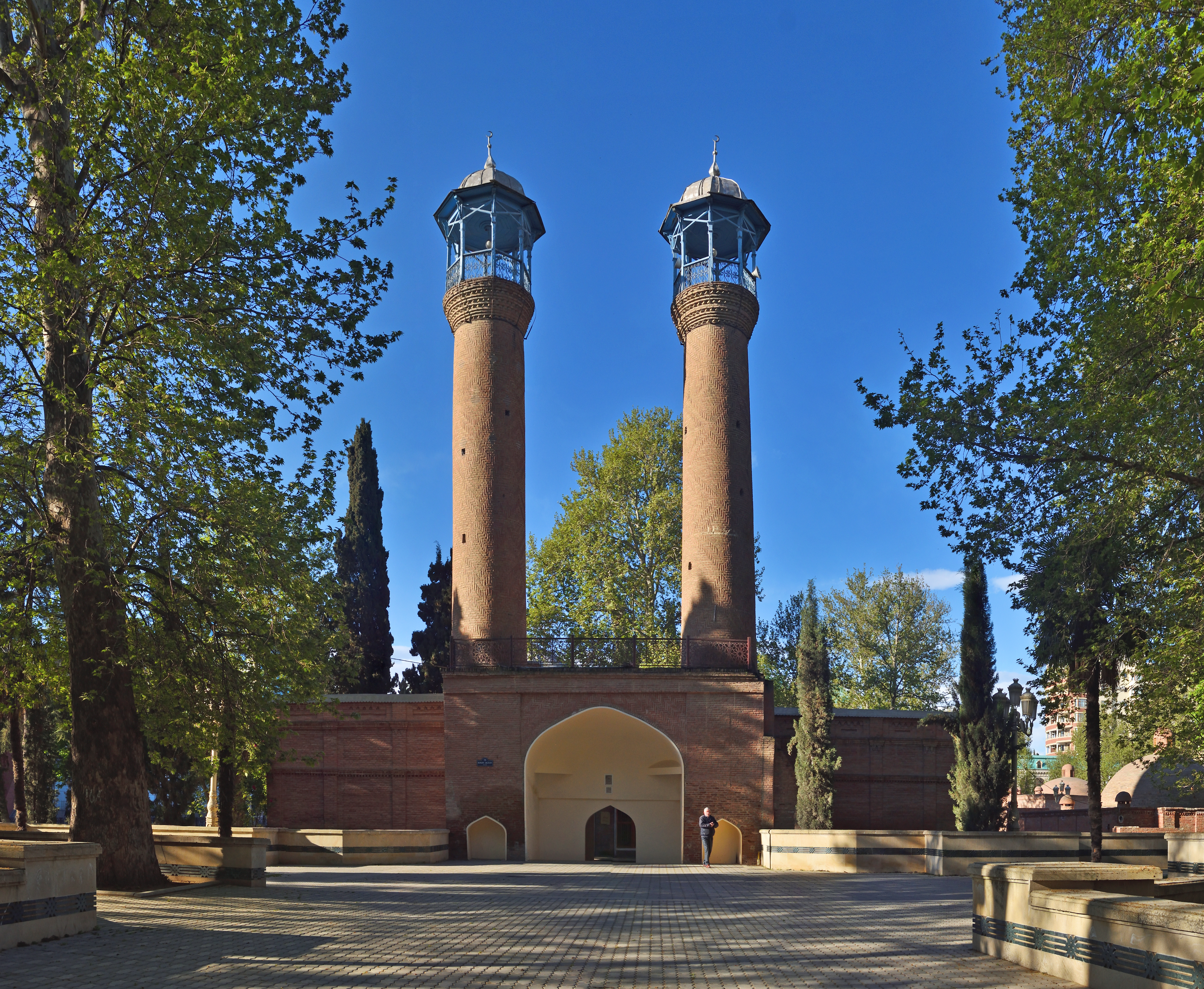
The Shah Abbas Mosque in Ganja, where Akhundov studied and met Mirza Shafi Vazeh, who steered him from becoming an Islamic clergyman

Haji Ali Asghar and his family endured difficulties throughout the war, losing their possessions. Following the conclusion of the war and another Iranian defeat, Haji Ali Asghar and his family relocated to Nukha. There he continued teaching Akhundov Arabic and Persian literature. In 1832, Akhundov was sent to the Shah Abbas Mosque in Ganja to study logic and Islamic jurisprudence with the Shia theologian Akhund Molla Hossein. This was arranged by Haji Ali Asghar, who wanted Akhundov to become an Islamic clergyman.

Mirza Shafi Vazeh, a mystic, poet, and calligrapher who had been associated with mystical and atheistic ideas, was someone Akhundov encountered while studying in Ganja. Initially, Akhundov planned to learn calligraphy from Mirza Shafi, but their conversations quickly strayed into topics such as Islam, philosophy, mysticism, and the activities of the Shia clergy. Akhundov was adamant on learning Islamic law and jurisprudence in order to become a member of the Shia religious hierarchy, but this changed when he met Mirza Shafi. Akhundov wrote about the impact Mirza Shafi had on him:

One day, this honourable man [Mirza Shafi], asked me: "Mirza Fath Ali what is your intention in studying [Islamic] sciences?" I answered that I wished to become a clergyman. He said, "Do you wish to become a hypocrite and a charlatan?" I was surprised and shocked ... Mirza Shafi looked at me and said: "Mirza Fath Ali, do not waste your life among this abominable group of people and choose another profession". When I asked him about the reasons for his hatred of the clergy, he began to reveal matters which until then had remained hidden to me ... Until the return of my second father from pilgrimage, Mirza Shafi inculcated in me all the elements of mysticism, and lifted the curtain of ignorance from my eyes. After this incident, I began to hate the clergy and I changed my intentions.

Haji Ali Asghar disapproved of his Akhundov's new aspirations and had him moved back to Nukha in 1833. Despite this, he still agreed for Akhundov to attend the newly established Russian school there. There Akhundov started learning Russian, but the following year he was forced to stop at the school due to being too old for it.

== Later life ==
In 1834, Akhundzade moved to Tiflis (present-day Tbilisi, Georgia), and spent the rest of his life working as a translator of Oriental languages in the service of the Russian Empire's Viceroyalty. Concurrently, from 1837 onwards he worked as a teacher in the Tbilisi uezd Armenian school, then in the Nersisian School. In Tiflis his acquaintance and friendship with the exiled Russian Decembrists Alexander Bestuzhev-Marlinsky, Vladimir Odoyevsky, poet Yakov Polonsky, Armenian writers Khachatur Abovian, Gabriel Sundukian and others played some part in the formation of Akhundzade's Europeanised outlook.

Akhundzade's first published work was "The Oriental Poem" (1837), a Persian lament on the death of Alexander Pushkin. But the rise of Akhundzade's literary activity comes in the late 1850s. In early 1850s, Akhundzade wrote six comedies (Hekayati Molla Ibrahim-Khalil Kimyagar, The story of Monsieur Jourdan, a botanist and the dervish Mastalishah, a famous sorcerer, Adventures of the Lankaran Khanate Vizier, etc.) – the first comedies in Azerbaijani literature as well as the first samples of the national dramaturgy. The comedies by Akhundzade are unique in their critical pathos and analysis of the realities in Azerbaijan of the first half of the 19th century. These comedies found numerous responses in the Russian other foreign periodical press. Through Persian translation, his plays also played an important role in the birth of modern Iranian theater. The German Magazine of Foreign Literature called Akhundzade a "dramatic genius" and "the Azerbaijani Molière." Akhundzade's sharp pen was directed against everything that he believed hindered the advance of the Russian Empire, which for Akhundzade was a force for modernisation, in spite of the atrocities it committed in its southern advance against Akhundzade's own kin. According to Walter Kolarz, Akhundzade "was so completely devoted to the Russian cause that he urged his compatriots to fight Turkey during the Crimean War."

In 1859 Akhundzade published his short but famous novel The Deceived Stars. In this novel he laid the foundation of Azerbaijani realistic historical prose, giving the models of a new genre in Azerbaijani literature. Through his comedies and dramas, Akhundzade established realism as the leading trend in Azerbaijani literature.

According to Ronald Grigor Suny, Akhundzade influenced Turkish nationalist intellectuals in the late 19th and early 20th centuries, as did other intellectuals from the Russian Empire.

== Iranian nationalism ==
Akhundzade identified himself as belonging to the nation of Iran (mellat-e Iran) and to the Iranian homeland (vatan). He corresponded with Jalal al-Din Mirza (a minor Qajar prince, son of Bahman Mirza Qajar, 1826–70) and admired this latter's epic Nameh-ye Khosrovan (Book of sovereigns), which was an attempt to offer the modern reader biographies of Iran's ancient kings, real and mythical, without recourse to any Arabic loanword. The Nameh-ye Khosrovan presents the pre-Islamic past as one of grandeur, and the advent of Islam as a radical rupture.

Mirza Aqa Khan Kermani (1854–1896) was one of Akhundzade's disciples. Three decades later he endeavoured to disseminate Akhundzade's thought while also significantly strengthening its racial content. Mirza Aqa Khan Kermani also followed Jalal-al-Din Mirza in producing a national history of Iran, A'ine-ye sekandari (The Alexandrian mirror), extending from the mythological past to the Qajar era, again to contrast a mythicised and fantasised pre-Islamic past with a present that falls short of nationalist expectations.

According to Tadeusz Swietochowski:

In his glorification of the pre-Islamic greatness of Iran, before it was destroyed at the hands of the "hungry, naked and savage Arabs," Akhundzadä was one of the forerunners of modern Iranian nationalism, and of its militant manifestations at that. Nor was he devoid of anti-Ottoman sentiments, and in the spirit of the age-long Iranian-Ottoman confrontation, he ventured into his writing on the victory of Shah Abbas I over the Turks at Baghdad. Akhundzadä is counted as one of the founders of modern Iranian literature, and his formative influence is visible in such major Persian-language writers as Malkum Khan, Mirza Agha Khan Kirmani, Zein ul-’Abdin Maraghai, and Mirza ʻAbd ul-Rahim Talibof. All of them were the advocates of reforms in Iran. If Akhundzadä had no doubt that his spiritual homeland was Iran, Azerbaijan was the land where he grew up and whose language was his native tongue. His lyrical poetry was written in Persian, but his work that carry messages of social importance are written in the language of the people of his native land, which he called Turki. With no indication of a split personality, he combined larger Iranian identity with Azerbaijani—he used the term vatan (fatherland) in reference to both [...].

Reza Zia-Ebrahimi too considers Akhundzade as the founding father of what he calls 'dislocative nationalism' in Iran. According to Zia-Ebrahimi, Akhundzade found inspiration in Orientalist templates to construct a vision of ancient Iran, which offered intellectuals disgruntled with the pace of modernist reform in Iran a self-serving narrative where all of Iran's shortcomings are blamed on a monolithic and otherized 'other': the Arab. For Zia-Ebrahimi, Akhundzade must be credited with the introduction of ethno-racial ideas, particularly the opposition between the Iranian Aryan and the Arab Semite, into Iran's intellectual debates. Zia-Ebrahimi disputes that Akhundzade had any influence on modernist intellectuals such as Malkum Khan (beyond a common project to reform the alphabet used to write Persian) or Talibov Tabrizi. His real heir was Kermani, and these two intellectuals' legacy is to be found in the ethnic nationalism of the Pahlavi state, rather than the civic nationalism of the Constitutional movement.

Akhundzade argued that the Arabs and Islam were responsible for the downturn of Iranian civilisation and argued that Iranians should look back to their glorious pre-Islamic civilisation. In the Maktubàt-e Kamàl od-Dowleh beh Shàhzadeh Jamàl od-Dowleh (Letters from Kamal od-Dowleh to Prince Jalal od-Dowleh, 1860, hereafter Maktubàt) his vision on the glorious pre-Islamic past is portrayed. Just like Jalal ed-Din Mirza Qajar, with whom he corresponded, he argued that Arabic loan words, the Arabic alphabet, and Islam should be removed. If this is accomplished, then according to him Iran can return to its glorious state. He was the first to compile these ideas into a coherent nationalist ideology, which makes him the father of Iranian nationalism. While Akhundzade is said to have been an atheist, he was very sympathetic to the Zoroastrian religion and corresponded with the Zoroastrian scholar Manekji Limji Hataria. However, per Zia-Ebrahimi, he appears to have known next to nothing about the religion.

== Alphabet reform ==
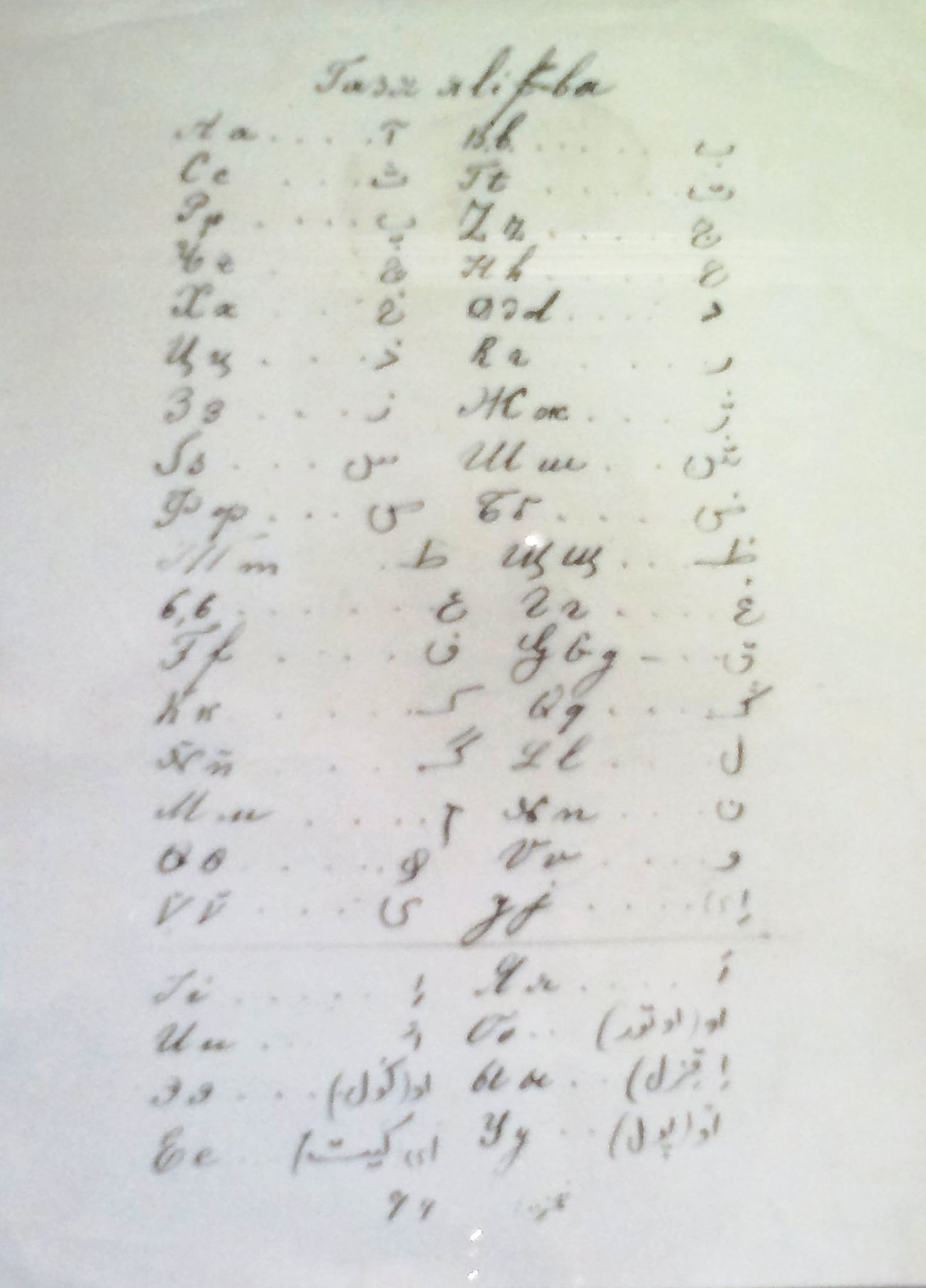
Project of new Latin-Cyrillic alphabet by Akhundov

Akhundzade was a keen advocate for alphabet reform, considering the Perso-Arabic script inadequate for representing Turkic sounds. He began his work on alphabet reform in 1850. His first efforts focused on modifying the Perso-Arabic script so that it would more adequately satisfy the phonetic requirements of the Azerbaijani language. First, he insisted that each sound be represented by a separate symbol with no duplications or omissions. The Perso-Arabic script expresses only three vowel sounds, whereas Azeri needs to identify nine vowels. Later, he openly advocated the change from Perso-Arabic to a modified Latin alphabet. The Latin script which was used in Azerbaijan between 1922 and 1939 and the currently used Latin script were based on Akhundzade's third version.

== Family ==
Akhundov married Tubu Khanum, his mother's cousin, in 1842. He had 13 children, of whom only two (Nisa and Rashid) reached maturity. His second marriage was to Nazli Beyim, a descendant of Javad Khan, with whom he fathered Sayrabayim. He married off both Nisa and Sayrabayim to Khan Baba Mirza from the Bahmani family. His grandson Fatali was executed during the Great Purge in 1938.

== Legacy ==
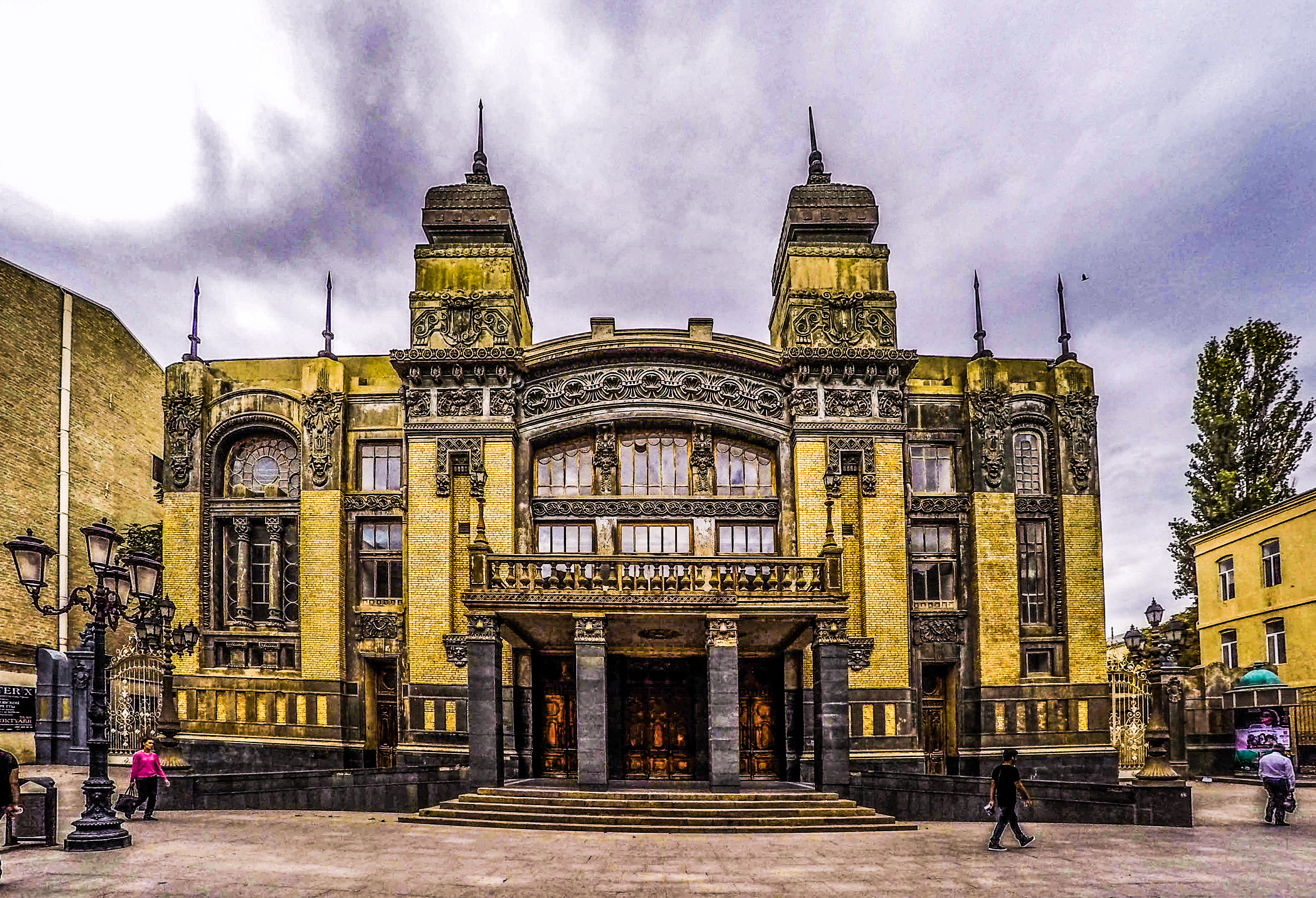
Akhundov Azerbaijan State Academic Opera and Ballet Theater

Besides his role in Azerbaijani literature and Iranian nationalism, Akhundzadeh was also known for his harsh criticisms of religions (mainly Islam) and remains the most iconic Azerbaijani atheist. National Library of Azerbaijan and Azerbaijan State Academic Opera and Ballet Theatre, as well as a couple of streets, parks, and libraries, are also named after Akhundzade in Azerbaijan. A cultural museum in Tbilisi, Georgia that focuses on Georgian-Azerbaijani cultural relations is also named after him.

Punik, a village in Armenia, was also named in Akhundzade's honor until very recently. TURKSOY hosted a groundbreaking ceremony to declare 2012 as the year of Mirza Fatali Akhundzade.

== House museum ==
House Museum of Mirza Fatali Akhundov
- Mirzə Fətəli Axundovun ev muzeyi
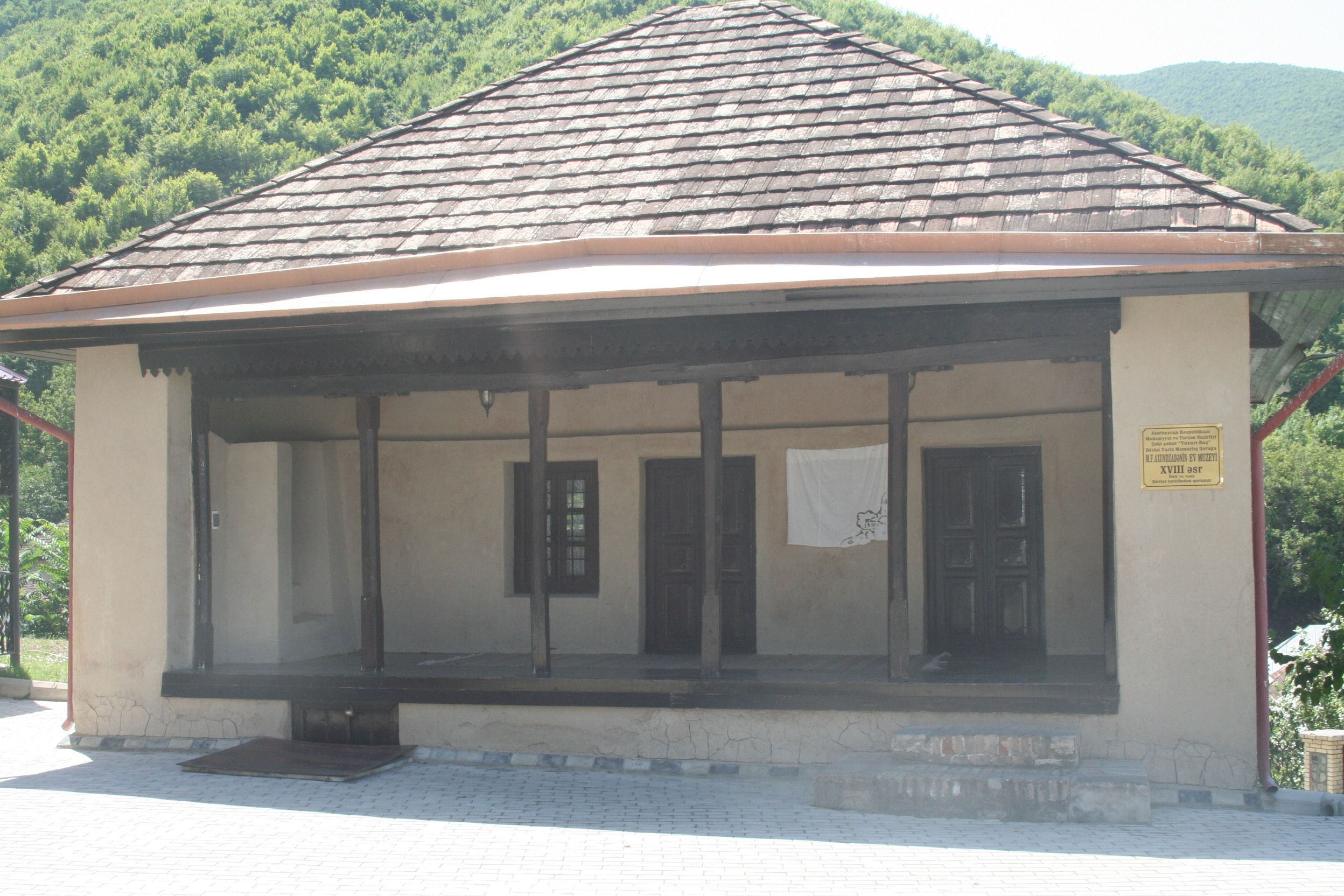
- House Museum of Mirza Fatali Akhundov; July 30, 2015
- Established: 1940
- Location: Shaki; Azerbaijan
- Coordinates: 41°12′N 47°12′E

Mirza Fatali Akhundov's house museum is located in Shaki. Akhundov was born in this house and spent his childhood and adolescence here. This museum is also the first memorial museum opened in Azerbaijan.

=== History ===
The house was built in 1800. In 1811, it was taken by Mirza Fatali Akhundov's father Mirza Mohammad Taghi. Mirza Fatali Akhundov was born here in 1812. Two years later, Akhundov's father moved with his family to Khamna village near Tabriz. Mirza Fatali's parents divorced when he was 13 years old. Later, in 1825, Akhundov returned to Shaki with his family. From this period, his mother's uncle Akhund Haji Alasgar began to take care of him. In 1833 he entered the Russian school opened in Shaki, and after studying there for a year he went to Tbilisi in 1834. In 1940, a museum was established in this house. In 2012, in honor of the 200th anniversary of Akhundov, the museum was overhauled.

=== Description ===
The museum consisted of two small interlocking rooms. There is another building near the house. It was built later and an exposition on the life and work of the great writer was created here. M. F. Akhundov's house museum consists of 2 buildings, an exposition hall dedicated to his life and work and the house where Akhundov was born.

The house was built of raw brick in the Shaki architectural tradition around 1800 and consists of two rooms, a balcony and a basement. There is a wooden structure between the floors. The stove also shows that the building was built in an oriental style. Antiques are exhibited in the rooms. In the past, there were stone and brick walls in the yard, a brick arched gate in the eastern style, and another two-storey, basement house made of raw bricks belonging to Mirza Fatali Akhundzadeh's cousins.

The Exposition Hall was built in 1975. The house-museum of Mirza Fatali Akhundzadeh was repaired in 2011–2012. The museum displays 248 exhibits.

=== Photos ===
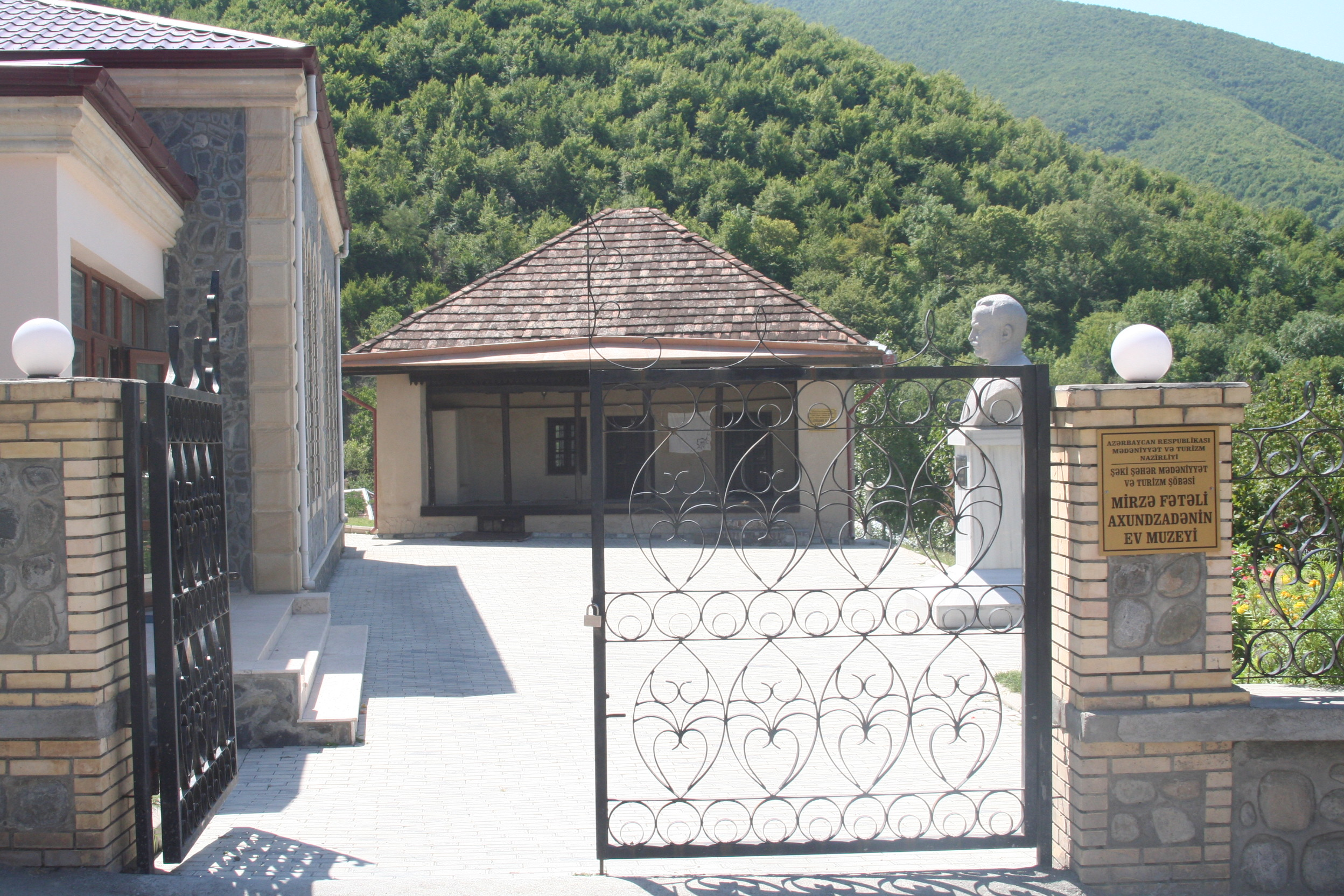

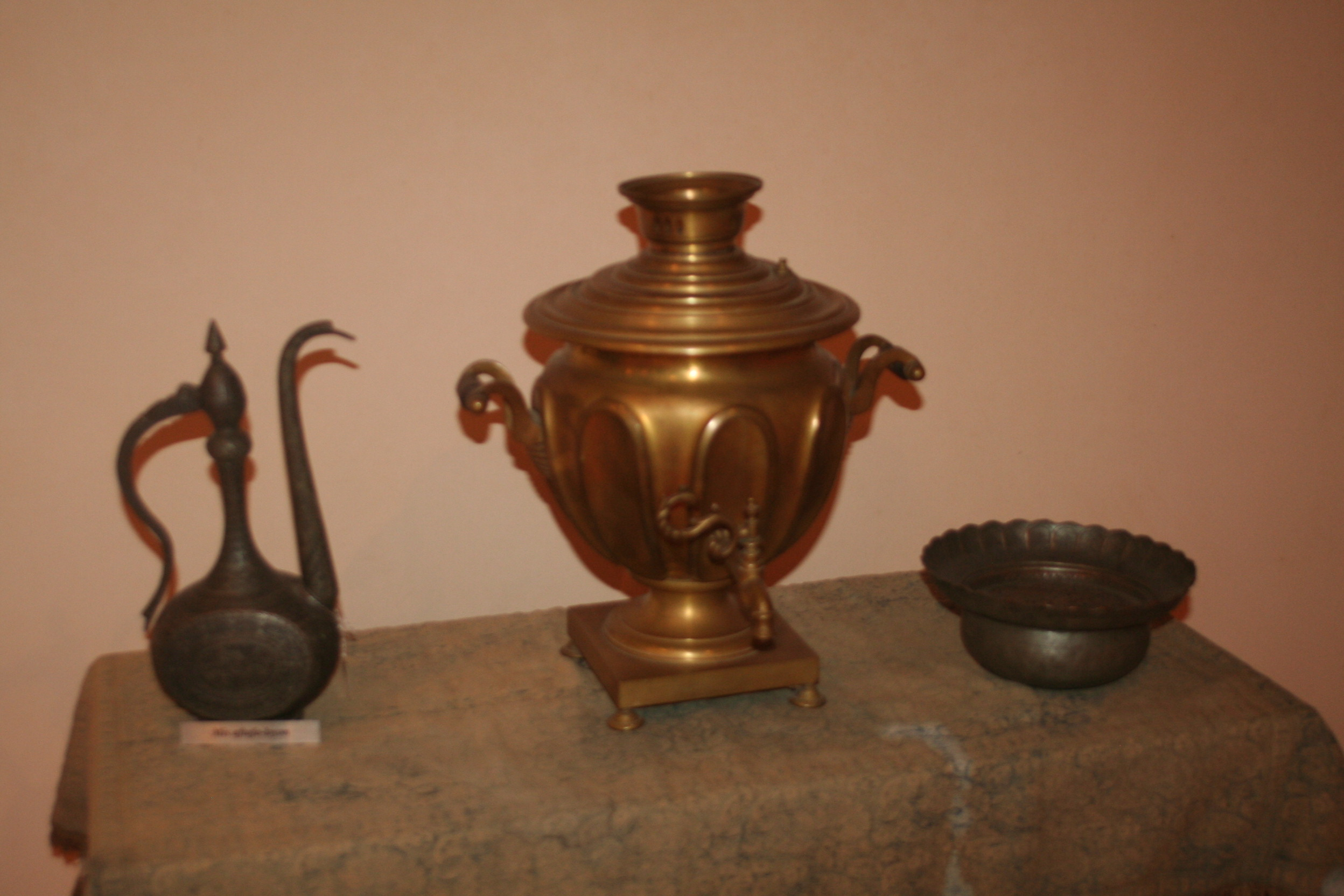

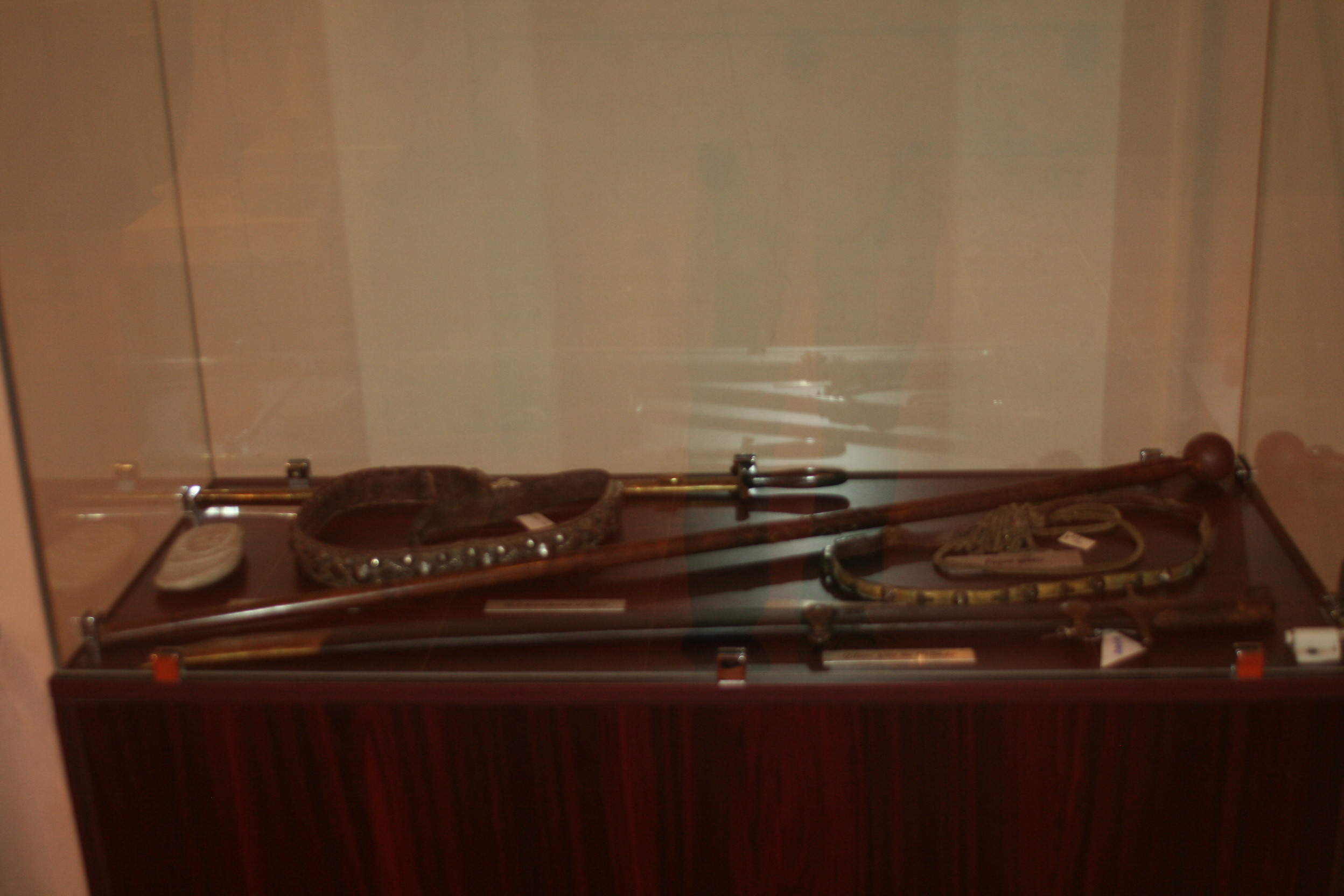

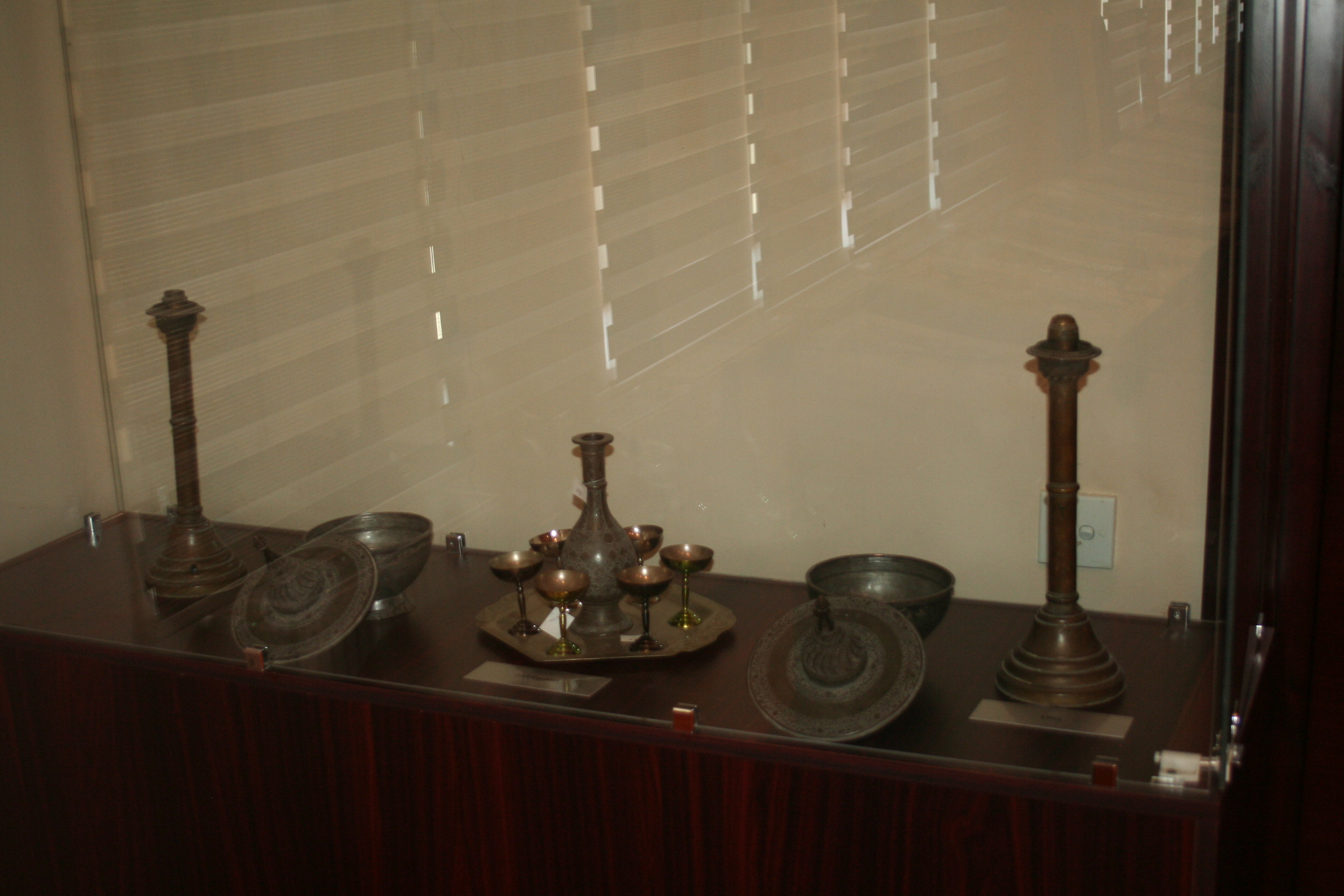

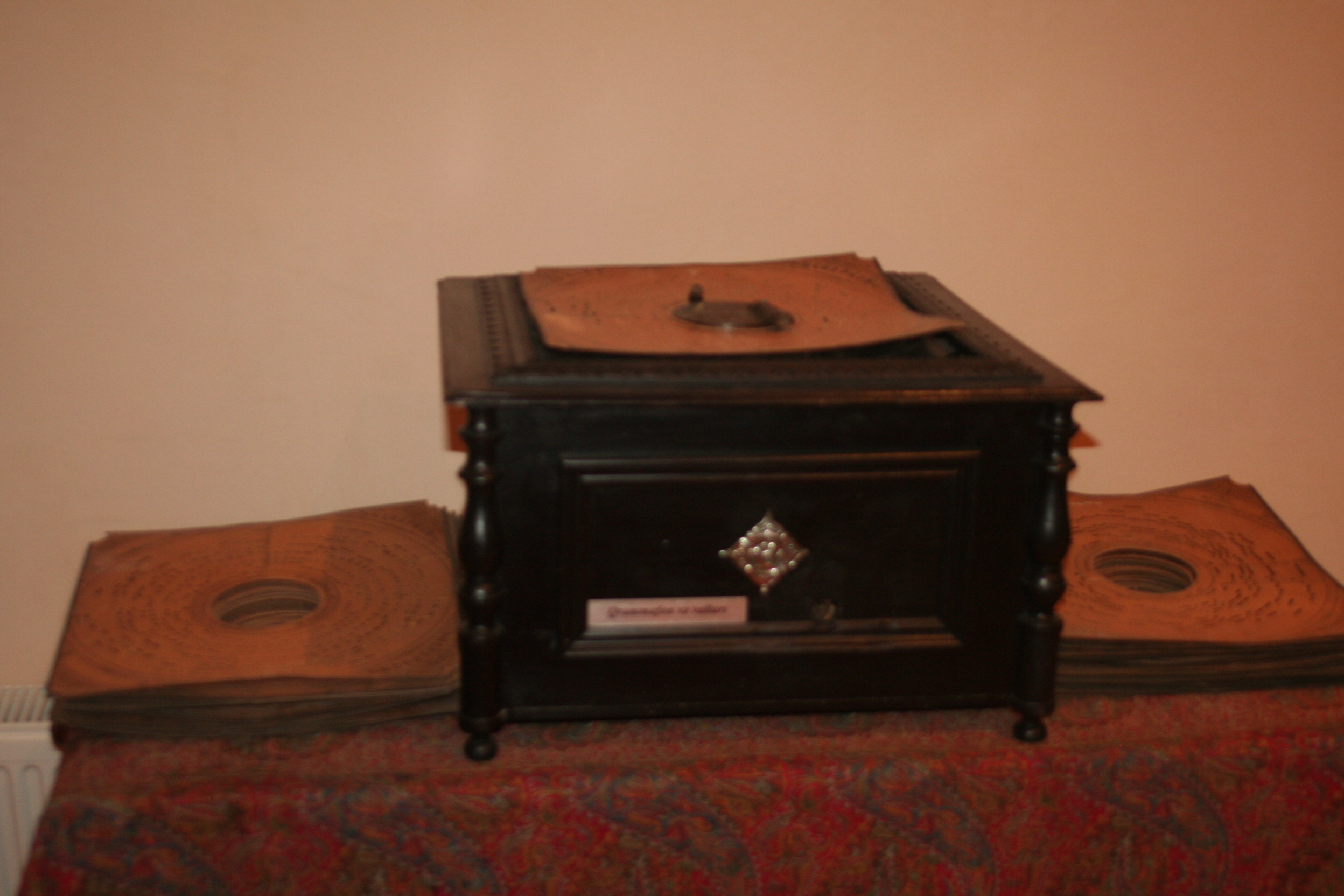

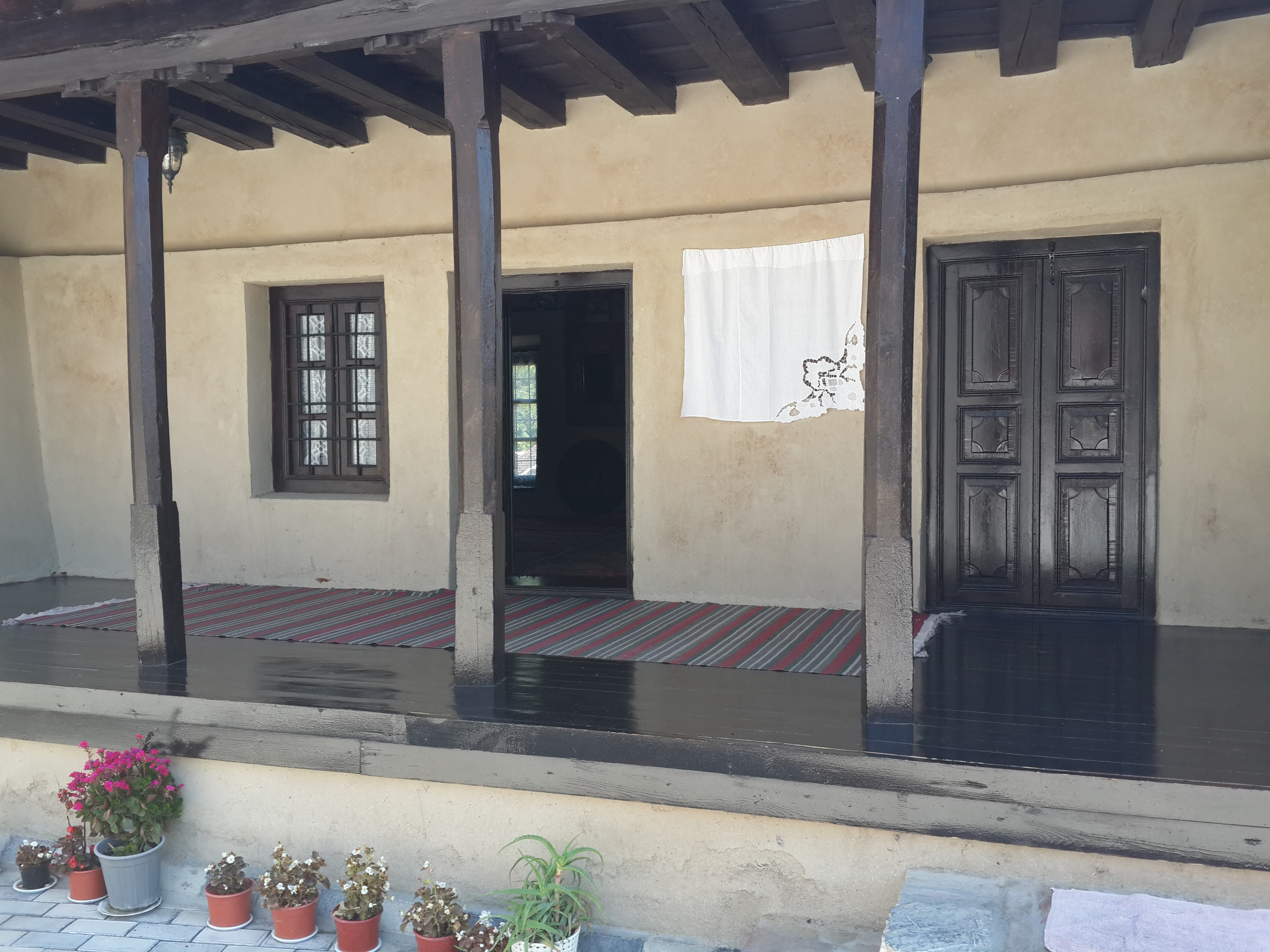

== Bibliography ==
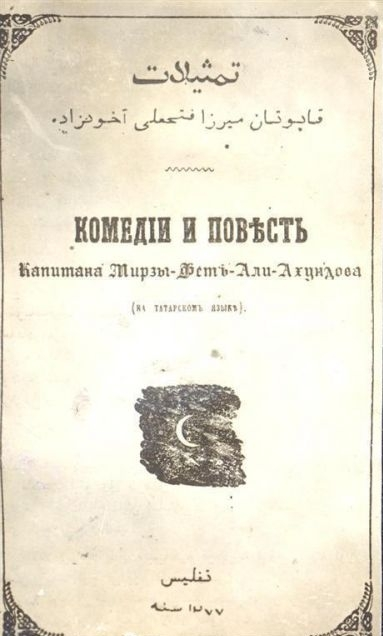
Tamsīlāt-i Kaputan Mīrzā Fath-ʿAlī Āḵūndzāda (Collection of plays of Mirza Fatali Akhundzade). Tiflis, 1859

Major works:

- Komedii Mirzy Fet-Ali-Akhundova (Комедии Мирзы Фетъ-Али-Ахундова (Comedies of Mirza Fatali Akhundov)). Tiflis, 1853.
- Tamsīlāt-i Kaputan Mīrzā Fath-ʿAlī Āḵūndzāda (Collection of plays of Mirza Fatali Akhundzade). Tiflis, 1859.

Works on literary criticism:

- Qirītīkah (Criticism)
- Risālah-i īrād (Fault-finding treatise)
- Fann-i kirītīkah (Art of criticism)
- Darbārah-i Mullā-yi Rūmī va tasnīf-i ū (On Rumi and his work)
- Darbārah-i nazm va nasr (On verse and prose)
- Fihrist-i kitāb (Preface to the book)
- Maktūb bih Mīrzā Āqā Tabrīzī (Letter to Mīrzā Āqā Tabrīzī)
- Uṣūl-i nigārish (Principles of writing)

== See also ==
- Mirza Fatali Akhundov National Library of Azerbaijan
- Mirza Fatali Akhundov State Prize of the Azerbaijan SSR

== Sources ==
- Abdolmohammadi, Pejman (2015). "Remarks on the Origins of Secularism and Nationalism in Iran: The Case of Mirzā Fatḥʿalī Āḫūndzāde". Eurasian Studies. 13 (1–2): 153–179. doi:10.1163/24685623-12340008.
- Algar, Hamid (1969). "Malkum Khān, Ākhūndzāda and the Proposed Reform of the Arabic Alphabet". Middle Eastern Studies. 5 (2). Taylor & Francis: 116–130. doi:10.1080/00263206908700123. JSTOR 4282282. (registration required)
- Algar, Hamid (2020). "Āḵūndzāda". Brill. doi:10.1163/2330-4804_EIRO_COM_5031.
- Algar, Hamid (2023) [1973]. Mirza Malkum Khan: A Biographical Study in Iranian Modernism. University of California Press. ISBN 978-0520022171.
- Amanat, Abbas; Martin, V.; Arjomand, S. A.; Ettehadieh, M.; Sirjani, S.; Soroudi, S. (2020). "Constitutional Revolution". Brill. doi:10.1163/2330-4804_EIRO_COM_7812.
- Ashraf, Ahmad; Gnoli, Gherardo (2020). "Iranian Identity". Brill. doi:10.1163/2330-4804_EIRO_COM_11030.
- Bournoutian, George (1976). The Khanate of Erevan Under Qajar Rule: 1795–1828. University of California. ISBN 978-0-939214-18-1.
- Bournoutian, George (2021). From the Kur to the Aras: A Military History of Russia's Move into the South Caucasus and the First Russo-Iranian War, 1801–1813. Brill. ISBN 978-90-04-44515-4.
- Gasimov, Zaur (2022). "Observing Iran from Baku: Iranian Studies in Soviet and Post-Soviet Azerbaijan". Iranian Studies. 55 (1). Cambridge University: 37–59. doi:10.1080/00210862.2020.1865136.
- Gould, Rebecca (2016). "The critique of religion as political critique: Mīrzā Fatḥ ʿAlī Ākhūndzāda's pre-Islamic xenology". Intellectual History Review. 26 (2): 171–184. doi:10.1080/17496977.2016.1144420. S2CID 147780901.
- Gould, Rebecca Ruth (2018). "Memorializing Akhundzadeh: Contradictory Cosmopolitanism and Post-Soviet Narcissism in Old Tbilisi" (PDF). Interventions: International Journal of Postcolonial Studies. 20 (4): 488–509. doi:10.1080/1369801X.2018.1439397. S2CID 151546731.
- Masroori, Cyrus (2007). "French Romanticism and Persian Liberalism in Nineteenth-century Iran: Mirza Aqa Khan Kirmani and Jacques-Henri Bernardin de Saint-Pierre". History of Political Thought. 28 (3). Imprint Academic Ltd.: 542–556. JSTOR 26222657. (registration required)
- Molavi, Mohammad Ali (2018). "آخوندزاده". The Great Islamic Encyclopaedia (in Persian).
- Kia, Mehrdad (1995). "Mizra Fath Ali Akhundzade and the Call for Modernization of the Islamic World". Middle Eastern Studies. 31 (3). Taylor & Francis: 422–448. doi:10.1080/00263209508701062. JSTOR 4283735. (registration required)
- Kia, Mehrdad (1998). "Women, Islam and Modernity in Akhundzade's Plays and Unpublished Writings". Middle Eastern Studies. 34 (3). Taylor & Francis: 1–33. doi:10.1080/00263209808701230. JSTOR 4283950. (registration required)
- Mazinani, Mehran (2015). "Liberty in Akhundzadeh's and Kermani's Thoughts". Middle Eastern Studies. 51 (6): 883–900. doi:10.1080/00263206.2015.1026897. S2CID 143161479.
- Parsinejad, Iraj (2003). A History of Literary Criticism in Iran, 1866-1951: Literary Criticism in the Works of Enlightened Thinkers of Iran--Akhundzadeh, Kermani, Malkom, Talebof, Maragheʼi, Kasravi, and Hedayat. Ibex Publishers. ISBN 978-1588140166.
- Rezaei, Mohammad (2021). "The Origins of the Early Iranian Enlightenment: The Case of Akhundzade's 'Qirītīkā'". Contemporary Review of the Middle East. 8 (1): 9–21. doi:10.1177/2347798920976274. S2CID 230559505.
- Sanjabi, Maryam B. (1995). "Rereading the Enlightenment: Akhundzada and His Voltaire". Iranian Studies. 28 (1/2). Cambridge University Press: 39–60. doi:10.1080/00210869508701829. JSTOR 4310917. (registration required)
- Seidel, Roman (2018). "The Reception of European Philosophy in Qajar Iran". In Pourjavady, Reza (ed.). Philosophy in Qajar Iran. Brill. ISBN 978-9004385610.
- Swietochowski, Tadeusz (2004) [First published 1985]. Russian Azerbaijan, 1905–1920: The Shaping of a National Identity in a Muslim Community (1st paperback ed.). Cambridge University Press. ISBN 978-0-521-52245-8.
- Yilmaz, Harun (2013). "The Soviet Union and the Construction of Azerbaijani National Identity in the 1930s". Iranian Studies. 46 (4): 511–533. doi:10.1080/00210862.2013.784521. S2CID 144322861.
- Zia-Ebrahimi, Reza (2010). "An Emissary of the Golden Age: Manekji Limji Hataria and the Charisma of the Archaic in Pre-Nationalist Iran". Studies in Ethnicity and Nationalism. 10 (3): 377–390. doi:10.1111/j.1754-9469.2011.01091.x. ISSN 1754-9469.
- Zia-Ebrahimi, Reza (2016). The Emergence of Iranian Nationalism: Race and the Politics of Dislocation. Columbia University Press. ISBN 978-0231175777.
