= Reza Zia-Ebrahimi =

British scholar (born 1977)

Reza Zia‑Ebrahimi
- Born: 1977 (age 48–49)
- Occupations: Historian of nationalism and race
- Employer: King’s College London

Academic background
- Education: University of Oxford (PhD)
- Thesis: The Emergence of Iranian Nationalism: Modernity and the Politics of Dislocation 1860-1940 (2011)
- Doctoral advisor: Homa Katouzian

Academic work
- Discipline: Historian
- Institutions: King's College London

Reza Zia-Ebrahimi is a historian of race and nationalism at King's College London.

== Life and works ==
=== Selected publications ===
- Zia-Ebrahimi, Reza (2016-04-05). The Emergence of Iranian Nationalism. Columbia University Press. doi:10.7312/columbia/9780231175760.001.0001. ISBN 978-0-231-17576-0.
- Zia-Ebrahimi, Reza (2021). Antisémitisme et islamophobie: une histoire croisée (in French). Éditions Amsterdam. ISBN 978-2-35480-221-9.
