= List of museums in Azerbaijan =

This is a list of museums in Azerbaijan.

	List of museums	Picture	Date	Place
1.	Palace of the Shirvanshahs		15th-century	Baku
2.	Azerbaijan State Carpet Museum		1967	Baku
3.	Azerbaijan State Museum of Art		1936	Baku
4.	Azerbaijan State Museum of History		April 2, 2002	Baku
5.	Baku Museum of Miniature Books		2002	Baku
6.	Baku Museum of Modern Art		20 March 2009	Baku
7.	Ganja State History-Ethnography Museum		1924	Ganja
8.	Independence Museum of Azerbaijan		7 December 1919	Baku
9.	Historical-ethnographic museum of Khinalig village		2001	Quba
10.	Nizami Museum of Azerbaijan Literature		1939	Baku
11.	Aghdam Bread Museum		25 November 1983	Agdam
12.	Museum of Archaeology and Ethnography		1976	Baku
13.	Villa Petrolea		1882	Baku
14.	Uzeyir Hajibeyov's House Museum		20 November 1975	Baku
15.	ANAS House-Museum of Huseyn Javid		July 21, 1981	Baku
16.	House-Museum of Jalil Mammadguluzadeh (Baku)		1978	Baku
17.	House-Museum of Samad Vurgun		6 October 1975	Baku
18.	House-Museum of Nariman Narimanov		6 November 1977	Baku
19.	Lahij Museum of Local History		1985	İsmailli District
20.	Institute of Manuscripts of Azerbaijan		1986	Baku
21.	Nakhchivan State Museum of History		1924	Nakhchivan
22.	Stone Chronicle Museum		2015	Baku
23.	Hasanbey Zardabi Natural History Museum		1930	Baku
24.	Azerbaijan Customs History Museum		March 23, 2006	Baku
25.	Azerbaijan Medicine Museum		1986	Baku
26.	House-Museum of Sattar Bahlulzade		2014	Baku
27.	House-Museum of Azim Azimzade		1968	Baku
28.	House-Museum of Mammed Said Ordubadi (Baku)		1979	Baku
29.	House-Museum of Leopold and Mstislav Rostropovich		1998	Baku
30.	House-Museum of Jafar Jabbarly (Baku)		1979	Baku
31.	House-Museum of Uzeyir Hajibeyov (Shusha)		1959	Shusha
32.	Azerbaijan State Agriculture Museum		1924	Baku
33.	Azerbaijan State Museum of History of Religion		17 September 1990	Baku
34.	Rinay		1989	Baku
35.	House-Museum of Bulbul		1976	Baku
36.	Nakhchivan Memorial Museum		2000	Nakhchivan
37.	The Museum Center (Baku)		1991	Baku
38.	The Petroglyph Museum		26 December 2011	Qobustan, Baku
39.	Shusha Museum of History		1969	Shusha
40.	Azerbaijan Railway Museum		2019	Baku
41.	Azerbaijan State Museum of History of Karabakh		February 1991	Shusha
42.	Nakhchivan Literature Museum		June 12, 1967	Nakhchivan
43.	Azerbaijan State Theatre Museum		1934	Baku
44.	Azerbaijan Museum of Geology		1982	Baku
45.	Palace of Shaki Khans		1968	Sheki
46.	Palace of Nakhchivan Khans		1998	Nakhchivan
47.	Palace of Lankaran Khans		1978	Lankaran
48.	Baku Khans' Palace		2020	Baku
49.	Absheron Museum of History and Local Studies		1983	Baku

== See also ==
- List of libraries in Azerbaijan
- List of museums by country
