= Azerbaijan Museum of Geology =

Museum in Azerbaijan

- Azərbaycan Geologiya Muzeyi
- Established: 1982
- Location: Baku, Azerbaijan
- Coordinates: 40.3731°N 49.8202°E

The Azerbaijan Museum of Geology is located in Azerbaijan. The main activity of the museum is the presentation of rocks, minerals and ore samples, which characterize the country's mineral and raw material base.

== History ==
The museum was founded in 1969 as an area museum. In 1982, the museum was given the status of "Azerbaijan Museum of Geology" by the decision of the Council of Ministers of the former Soviet Union of Azerbaijan.

On May 21, 2008, President of the Republic of Azerbaijan Ilham Aliyev signed a decree on the allocation of one million manat from the Presidential Reserve Fund to improve the activities of the Ministry of Natural Resources and the Ministry of Environment. As part of this order, the museum has undergone extensive repair and reconstruction, and the structure of the museum has been modernized to modern requirements. The museum area is increased to 630 square meters. December 25, 2010, the opening ceremony of the museum after the overhaul.

== Exposition ==
In the exposition hall of the museum there are more than 5,000 ore, non-ore, construction materials, ornamental and facing stones, natural stone, mineral, paleontological findings, geological maps of various content reflecting the mineral resources of Azerbaijan as well as from other regions of the world, albums, booklets and other exhibits.

In 2016–2017, a total of 15 exhibits, including quartz minerals and decorative stones, were transferred to the foundation of the museum. These exhibits were found in the Dashkesan and Khyzy regions, as well as in the Lesser Caucasus and the northeast of the Greater Caucasus. One of the samples, quartz mineral, was found in the Zagatala region.

In February 2018, a specimen was transferred to the foundation of the museum - a mineral interspersed with galena, sphalerite and quartz, which was found in the Soyugbulag, Gadabay and is believed to belong to the Middle Jurassic period of the Mesozoic era. In addition, in the first half of the year, 2 more exhibits were transferred to the museum.

There are six sections in the museum to create a clear idea of the natural wealth of the earth in the Republic of Azerbaijan.

=== Regional geology ===
The Regional Geography section includes distinct geological maps reflecting stratigraphy, lithology, petrography, tectonics, magnetism, morphology, mud volcanoes, underground mineral waters and mineral deposits. The geological map of the republic is based on relief on the scale of 1: 100 000. This section also includes geological, quaternary deposits of Azerbaijan, mud volcanoes, minerals, maps of the oil and gas states, as well as the geological map of the Caucasus in the scale of 1: 500,000. is displayed. In addition, Kern samples and geological cross-section from deep wells drilled in Saatli are preserved. This section also featured more than 510 rare rocks, ore, mono-mineral and druza, geodata samples.

=== Mineral raw material base of the Republic ===
Mineral raw material base of the Republic consists of two sections.

In the sculptures and podiums section of the Scythian Mineral Deposits have been taken from various fields of the republic and are composed of black, color, noble and others. Geometric maps, cross-sections, photographs of mountain industry objects, special stands, albums are displayed.

Nonmetallic raw materials the building materials sources section begin with a stand reflecting underground, mineral, thermal and fresh water. Mining, dolomite, zeolite, quartz, calcite (sulphate), sulfur arsenic, listvenite, obsidian-perlite, barite, kaolin, bentonite, natural dye and many other examples from the important fields and manifestations of mountain-chemistry and the mountain industry are demonstrated. A great part of the exposition is made of natural decorative stones and stands.

=== Petrography ===
In the petrography section, intrusive, effusive, sedimentary and metamorphic rocks were sampled. Besides rock samples brought from different regions of Azerbaijan, rocks from other regions of the world complete the petrography collection.

=== Mineralogy ===
In the section of mineralogy, the basis of the exposition forms samples of exchange from many regions of the world to complete the collection of minerals and collections from the territory of our republic. Crystal aggregates of minerals, free elements, sulfides, oxides, halide, carbonates, silicates, borates, phosphates, and sulphides and hydroxides are demonstrated here.

=== Paleontology ===
In the section Paleontology, remains of fauna and flora covering age periods from Silur to Neogene.

=== Photography ===
In the photo section, panoramas describing geologically interesting corners of the republic, minerals deposits, stone quarries and portraits of prominent geologists. Photographs transmitted by specialist geologists are used to design exhibits and stands.

== See also ==
List of museums in Azerbaijan
