= Azerbaijan Customs History Museum =

- Azerbaijani: Azərbaycan Gömrük Tarixi Muzeyi
- Established: March 23, 2006; 20 years ago
- Location: Baku, Azerbaijan
- Type: Customs
- Collection size: 600+
- Website: museums.createch-group.net

Azerbaijan Customs History Museum is a museum of State Customs Committee of the Republic of Azerbaijan, located in Baku, Azerbaijan.

== History ==
The museum was established by the State Customs Committee of the Republic of Azerbaijan on March 23, 2006, with order No. 034. The work on the establishment of the Azerbaijan Customs History Museum was completed on the eve of the 15th anniversary of the State Customs Committee of the Republic of Azerbaijan. On January 27, 2007, a section of the Museum of the History of Customs, the union of "Azerterminalcomplex" was opened.

In 2008 the Museum was accepted into the Azerbaijan National Committee of the International Council of Museums. Since September 2008 the museum is a member of the International Association of Customs Museums. In 2010, the "Azerterminalcomplex" section transformed into a branch of the Museum of Customs History. After confirmation from the Ministry of Culture and Tourism of Azerbaijan, the branch of the museum obtained its own fund and permanent exposition.

== Exhibition ==
Most of the museum's collection is arranged of cultural, scientific, historical and artistic cultural assets seized by customs officers and seized by the judicial authorities. From time to time most of these examples of art have been donated to museums, scientific institutions, and religious organizations, churches and mosques in Baku.

Exhibits of the Customs Museum are exhibited mainly in EU countries.

The collection of the museum is broadly focused on both thematic and regional aspects. The museum collection mainly consists of documents and photographs reflecting the customs history, as well as works of art created by various masters. The museum exhibition covers different periods, as well as exhibits exported for smuggling from Azerbaijan. The Azerbaijan Customs History Museum, which exhibits various antique goods and other works of historical and artistic value, is evidence of the fight against smuggling of customs officials and serves as a sign of observance of national interests and moral values. Until 2006, customs officers were transferring all confiscated art objects to museums. Later they began to systematize the found antiques, which were tried to be exported abroad.

The collection of the branch of the Customs History Museum has a modern fine art department represented by painting, sculpture, art and crafts. The first millennium excavations, carpets, oriental sculptures, copper items, ancient coins, antique and ancient icons, jewelry, firearms, weapons of the 17th-19th centuries, Quran and Bible copies, that were confiscated while trying to be exported from Azerbaijan are kept in the department. This department was created by the joint efforts of the museum and the Union of Artists of Azerbaijan.

Azerbaijan Customs History Museum exhibits confiscated historical and religious books, icons, other religious and religious rites and historical and cultural objects that have been confiscated as of today. For the first time, a museum was established by the State Customs Committee in 1999 for the transfer of religious books and icons confiscated by the Azerbaijani customs authorities in relevant religious assemblies.

== Philately ==
Below is a gallery of postage stamps depicting the exhibits of Azerbaijan Customs History Museum

Exhibits of the customs museum depicted on postage stamps

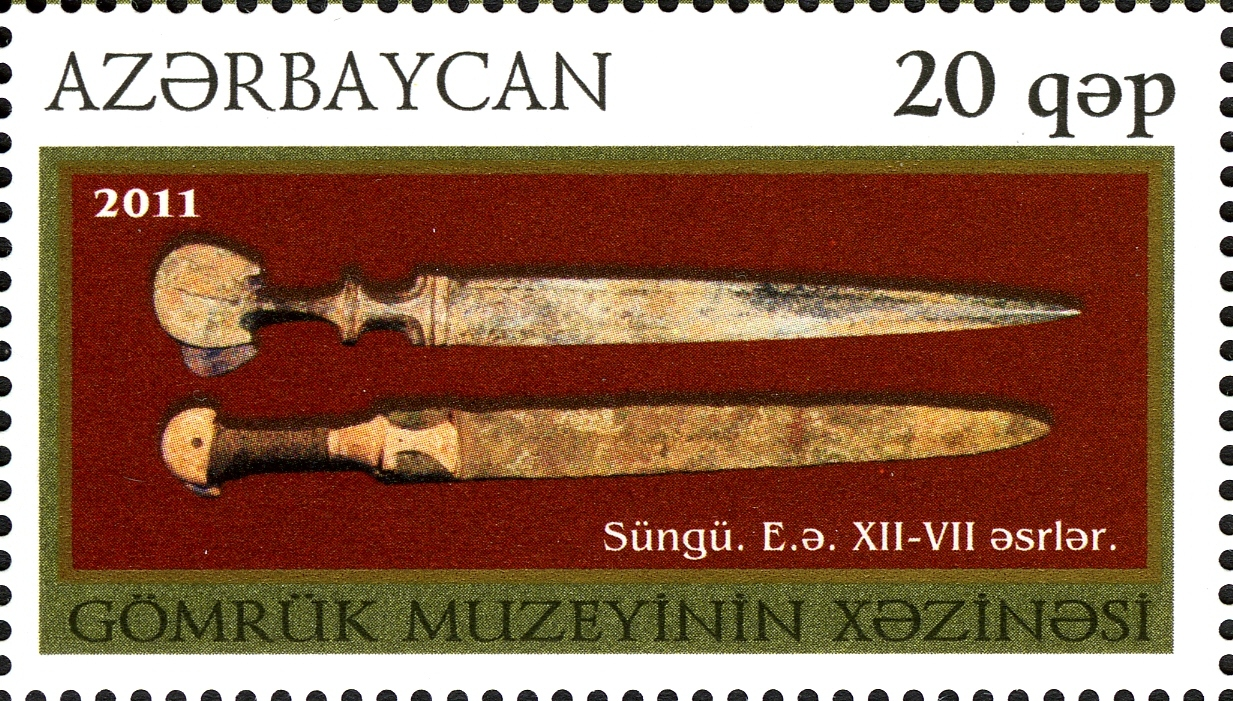

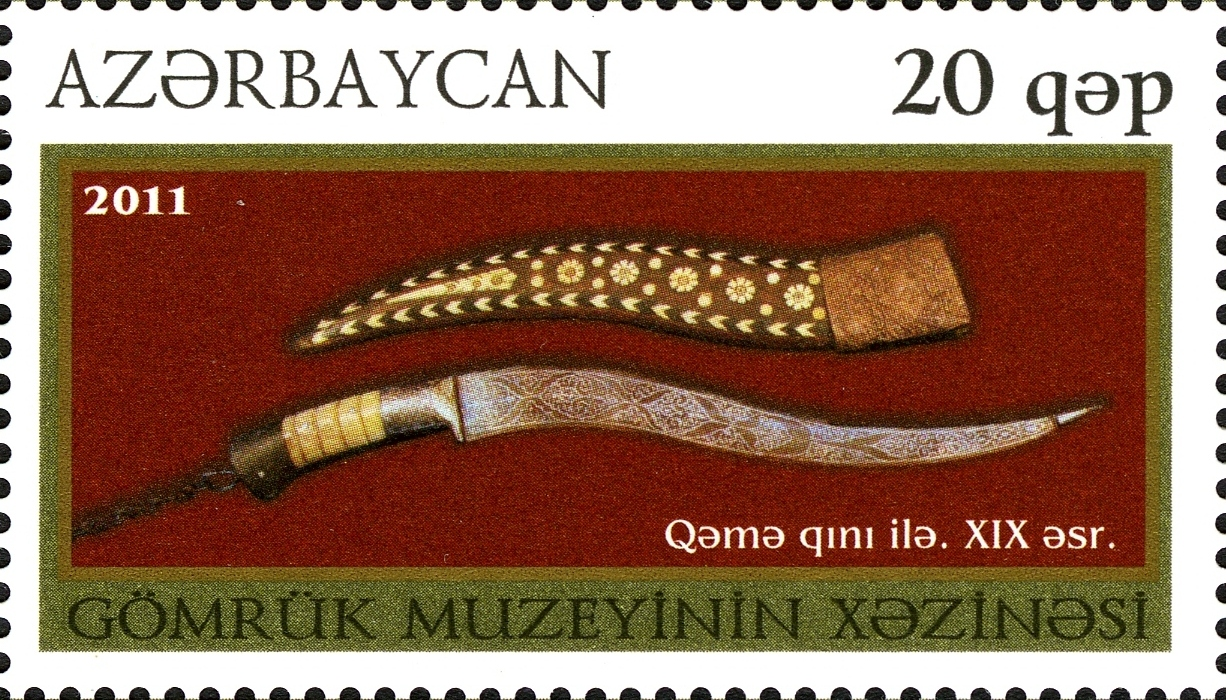

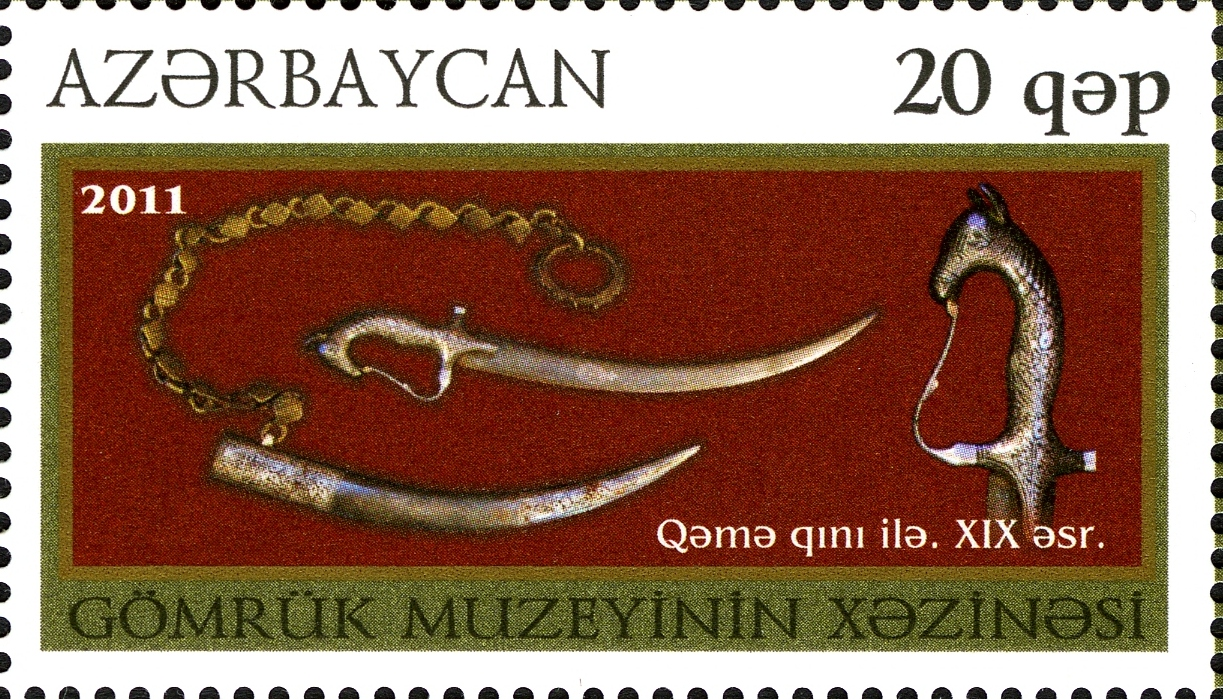

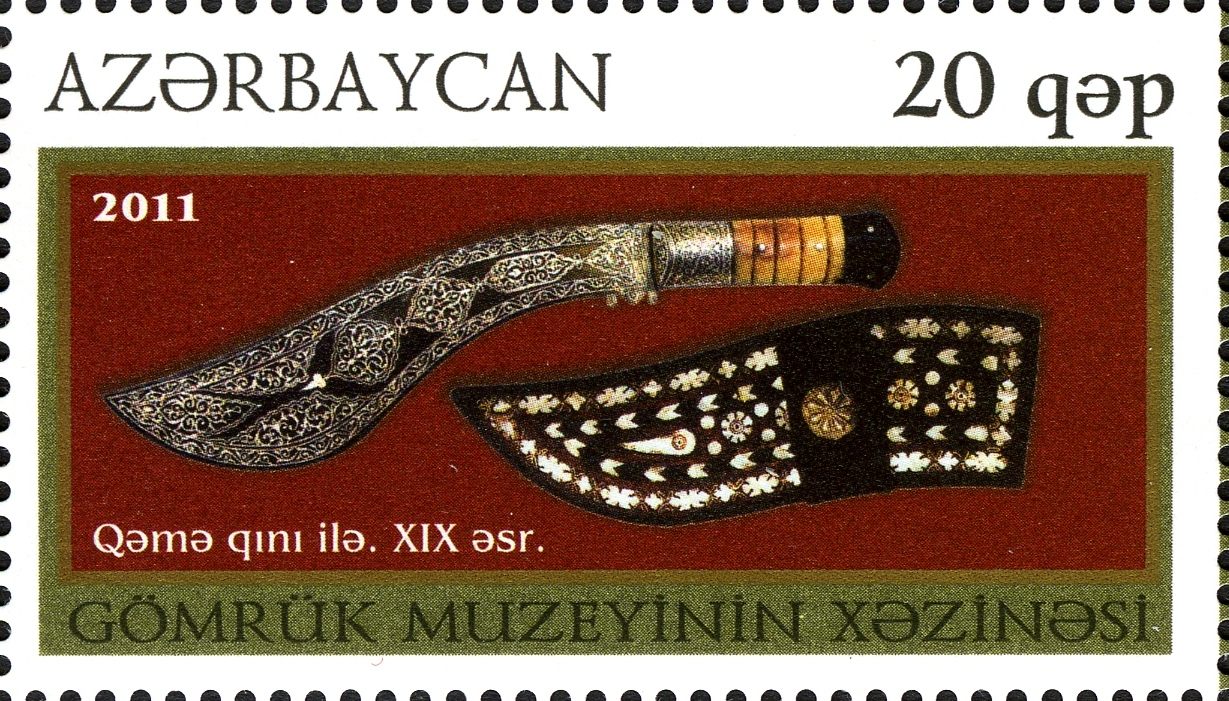

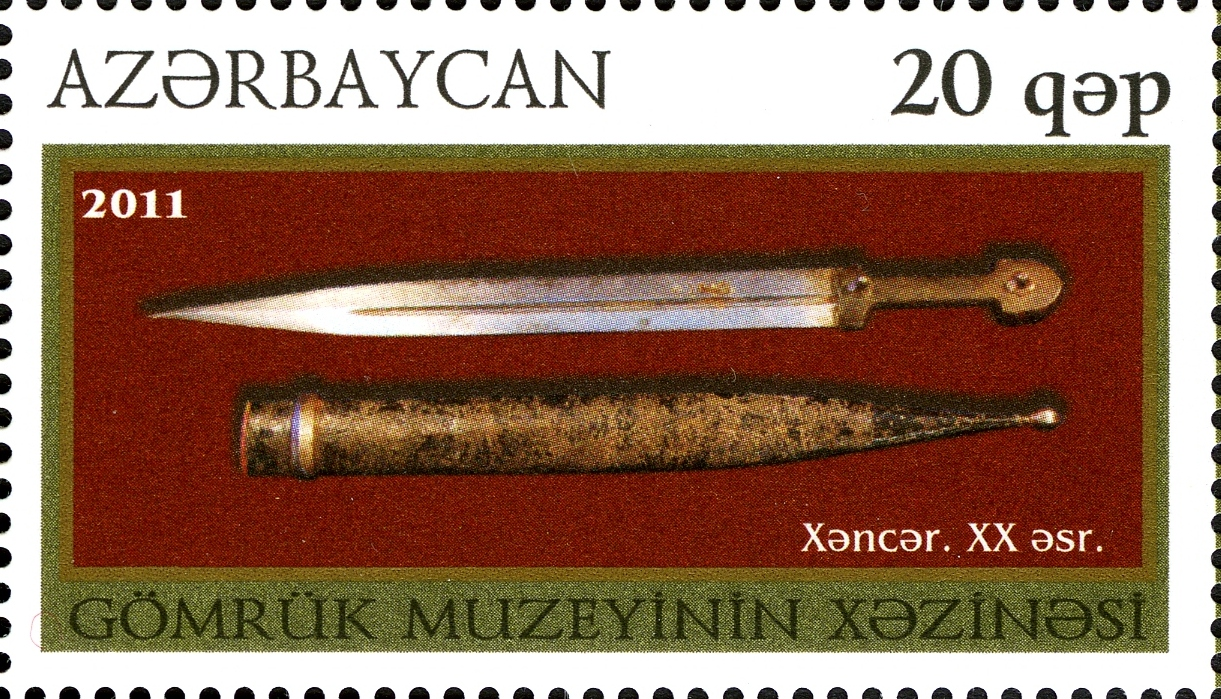

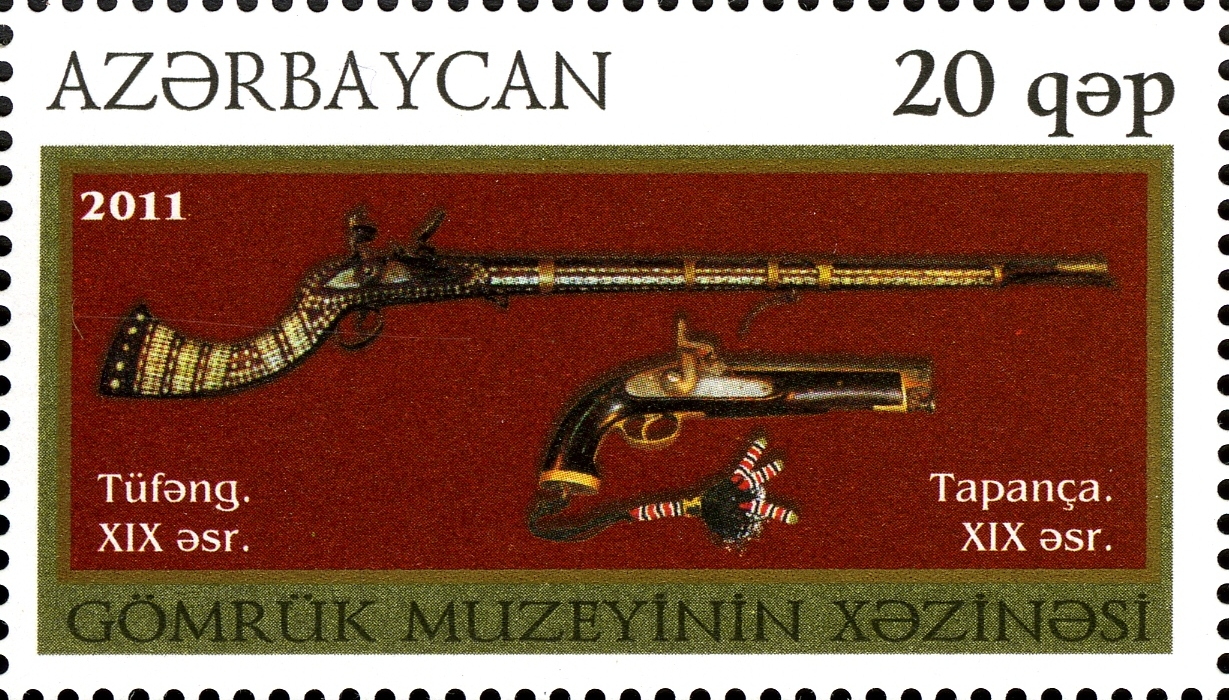

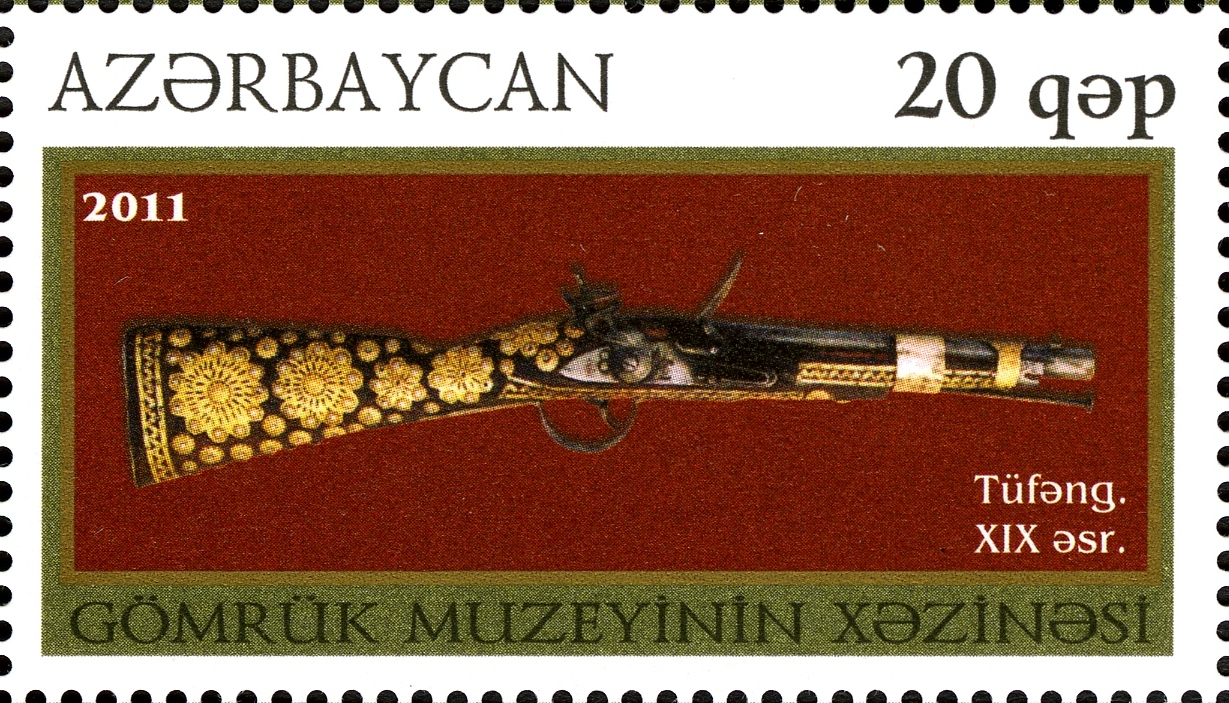

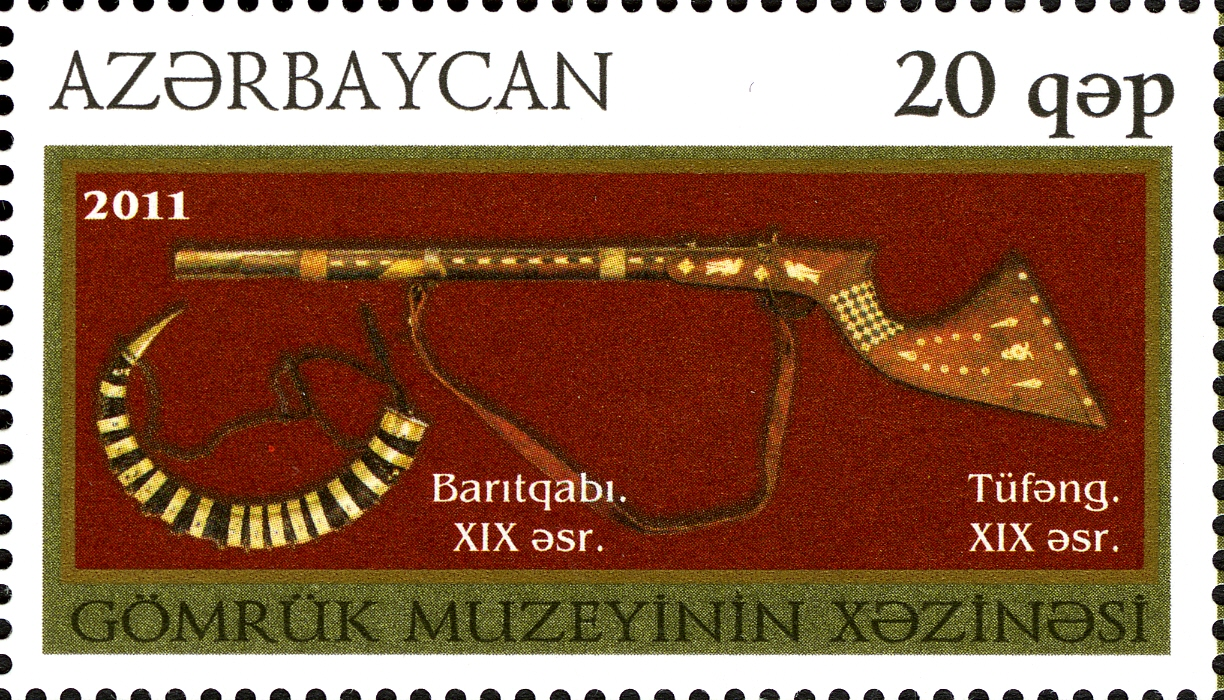
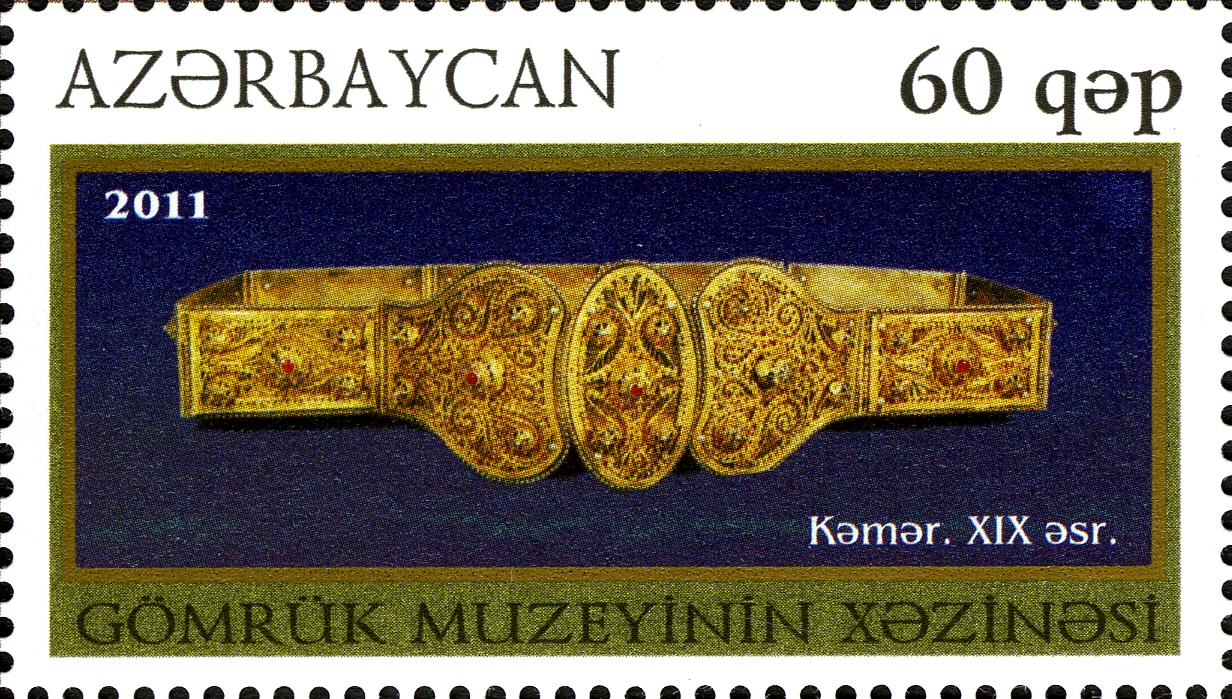

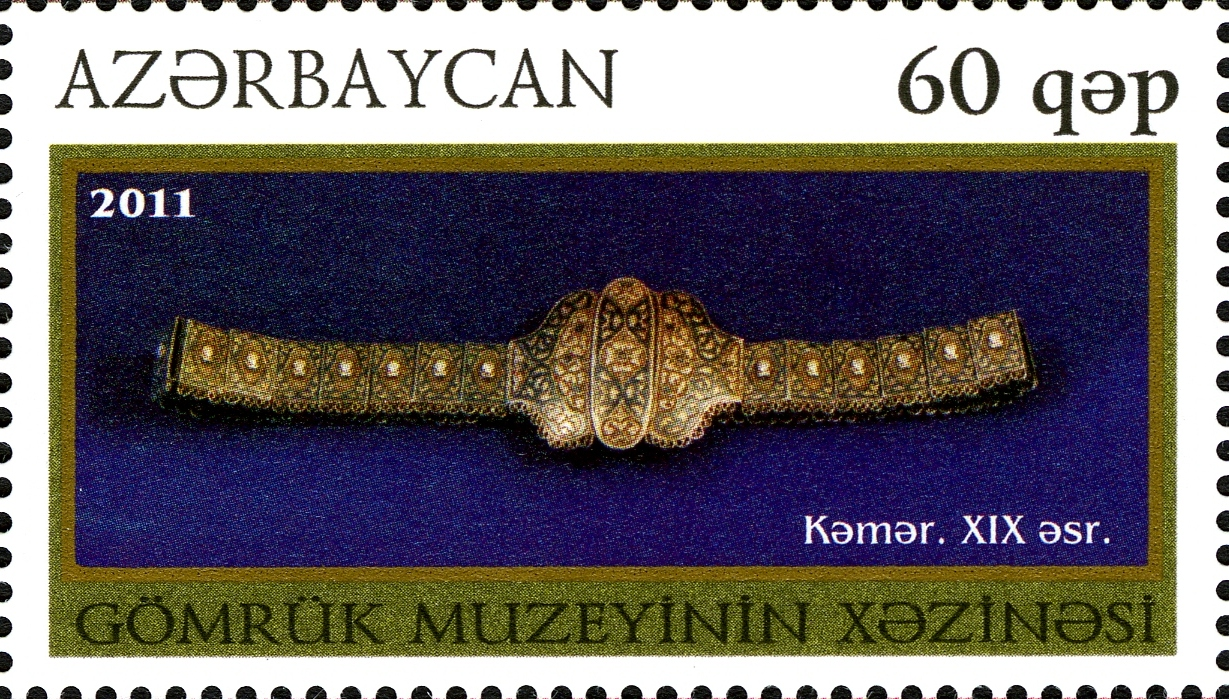

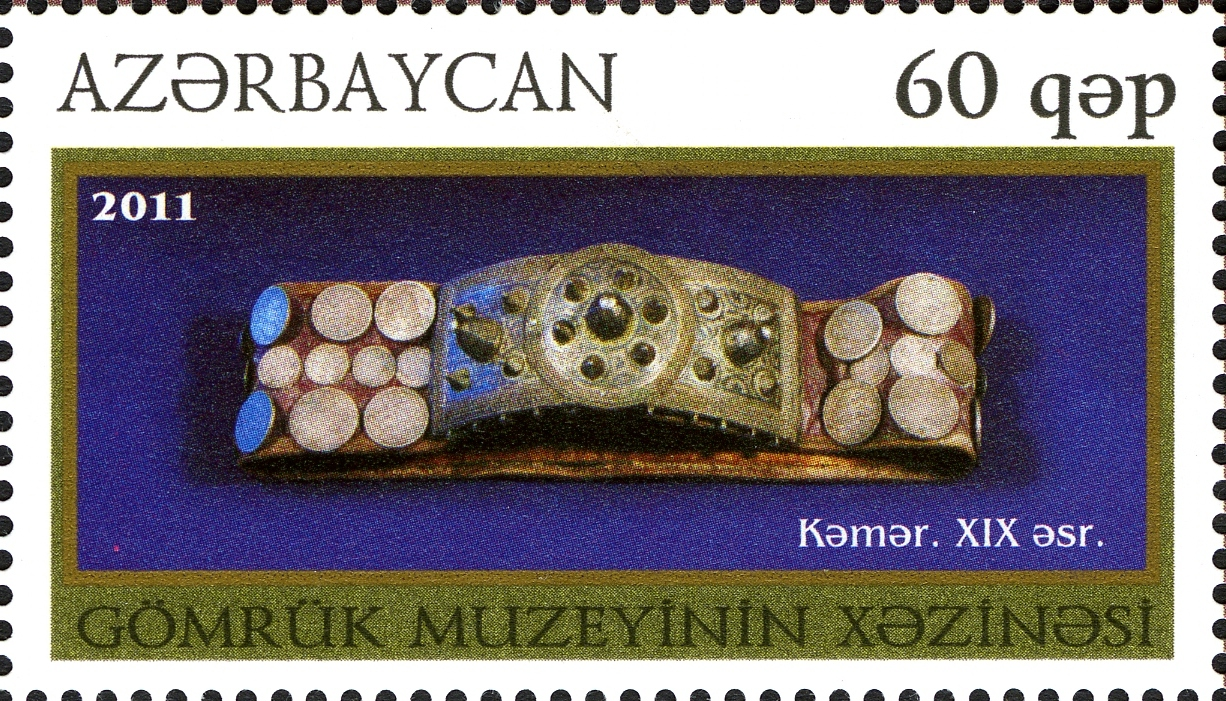

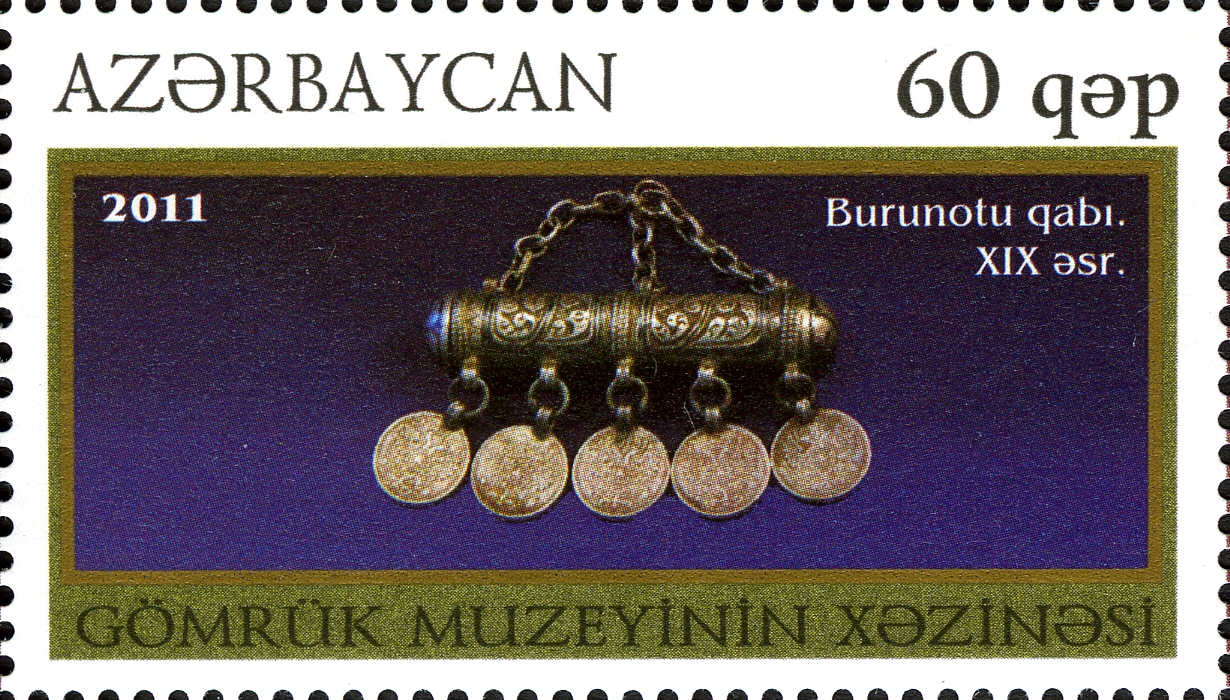

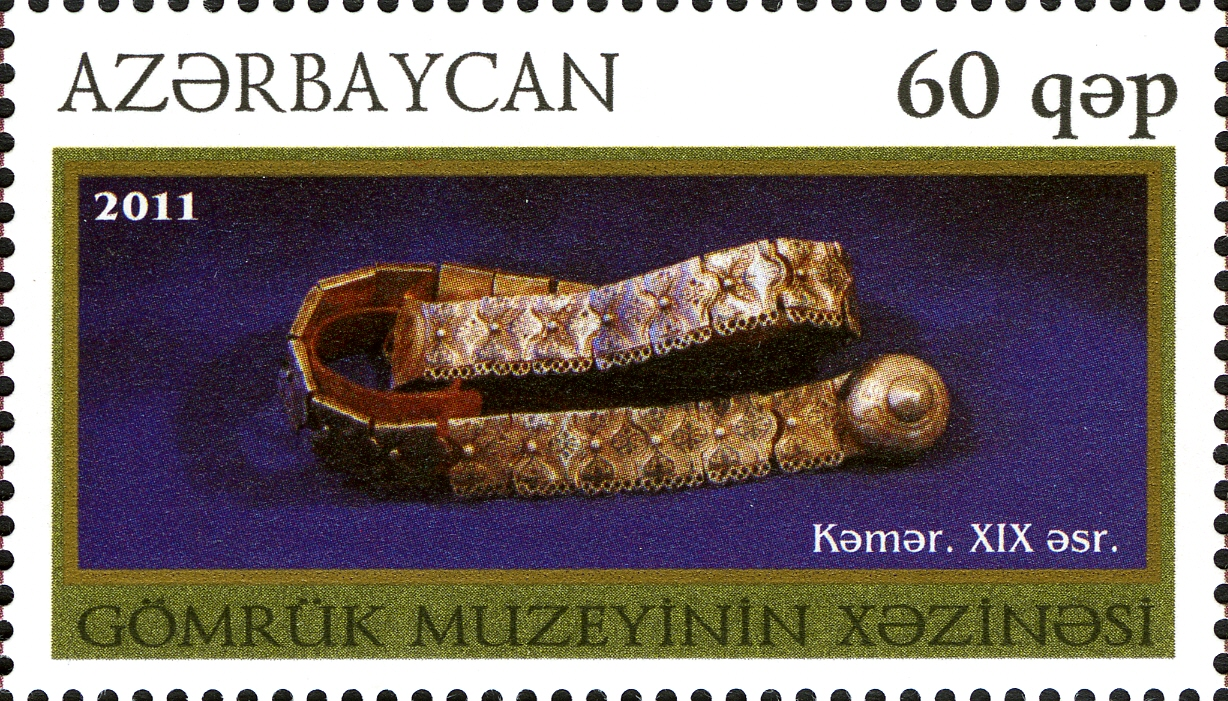

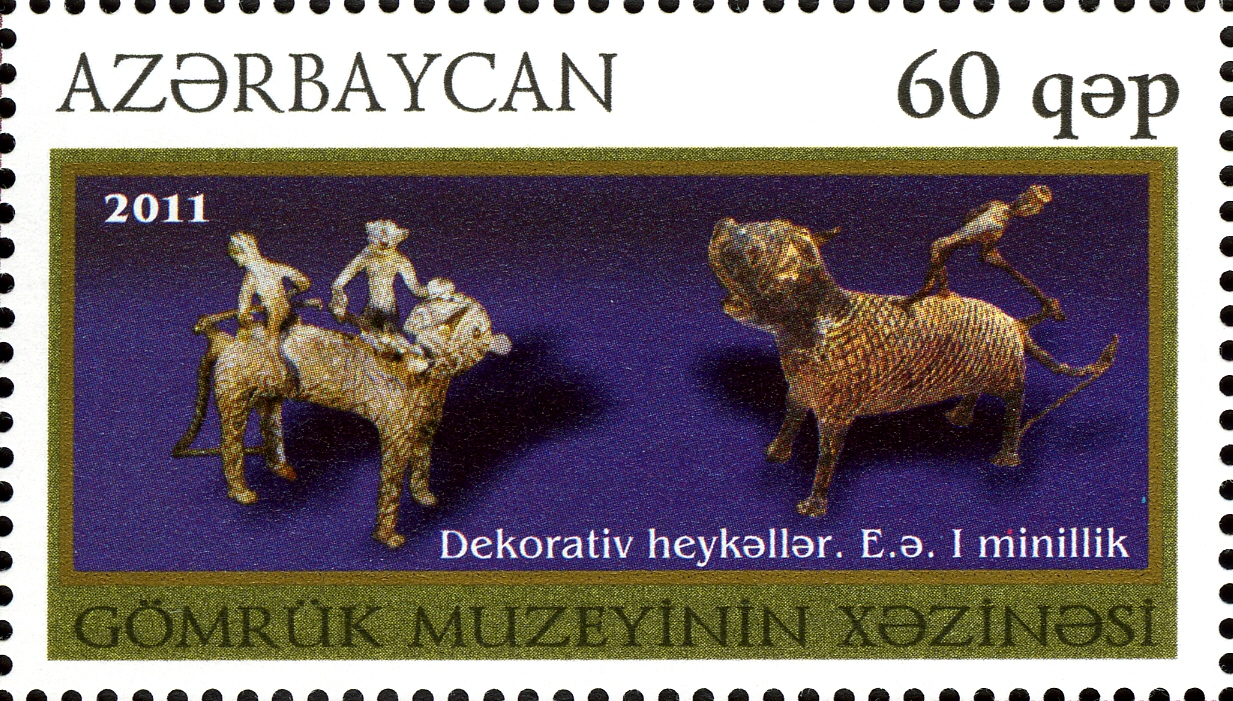

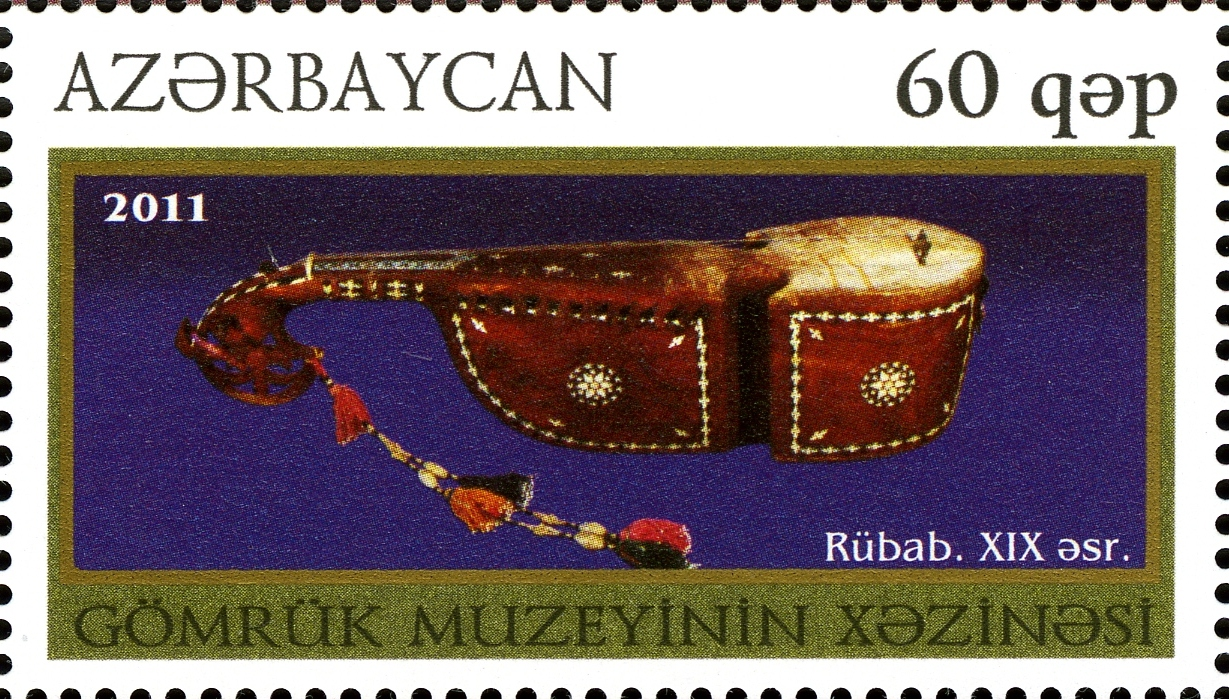

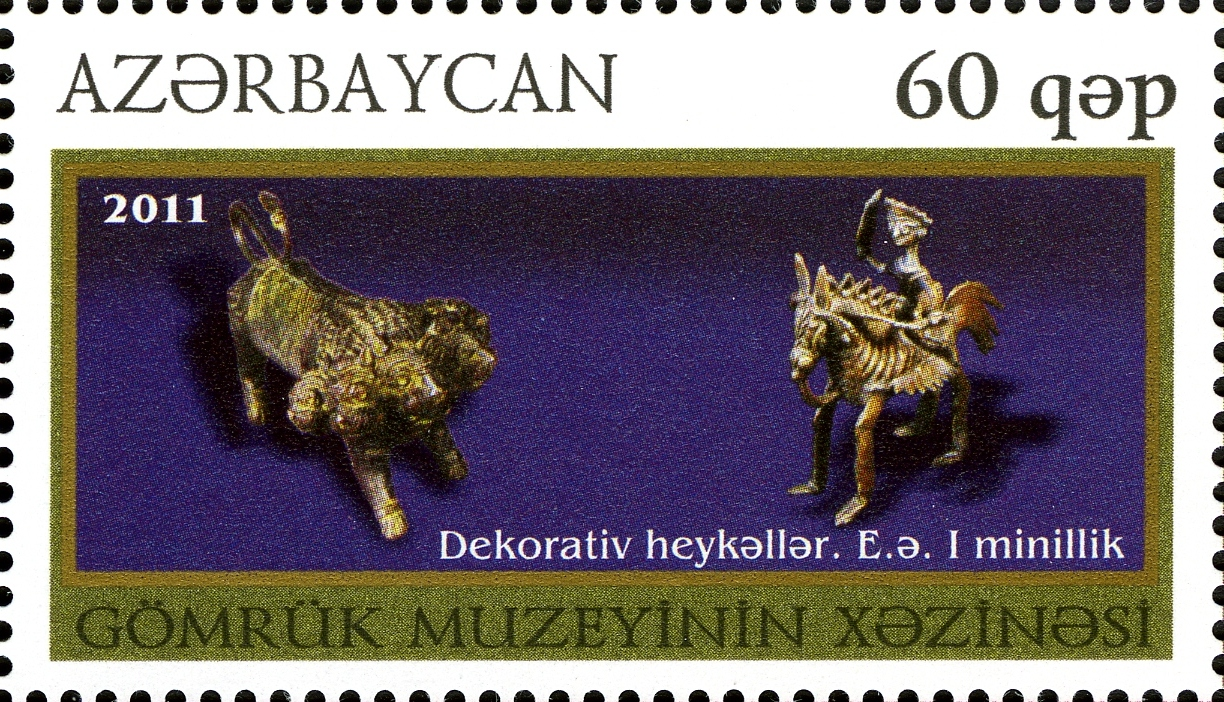
