= House-Museum of Sattar Bahlulzade =

- Səttar Bəhlulzadənin ev-muzeyi
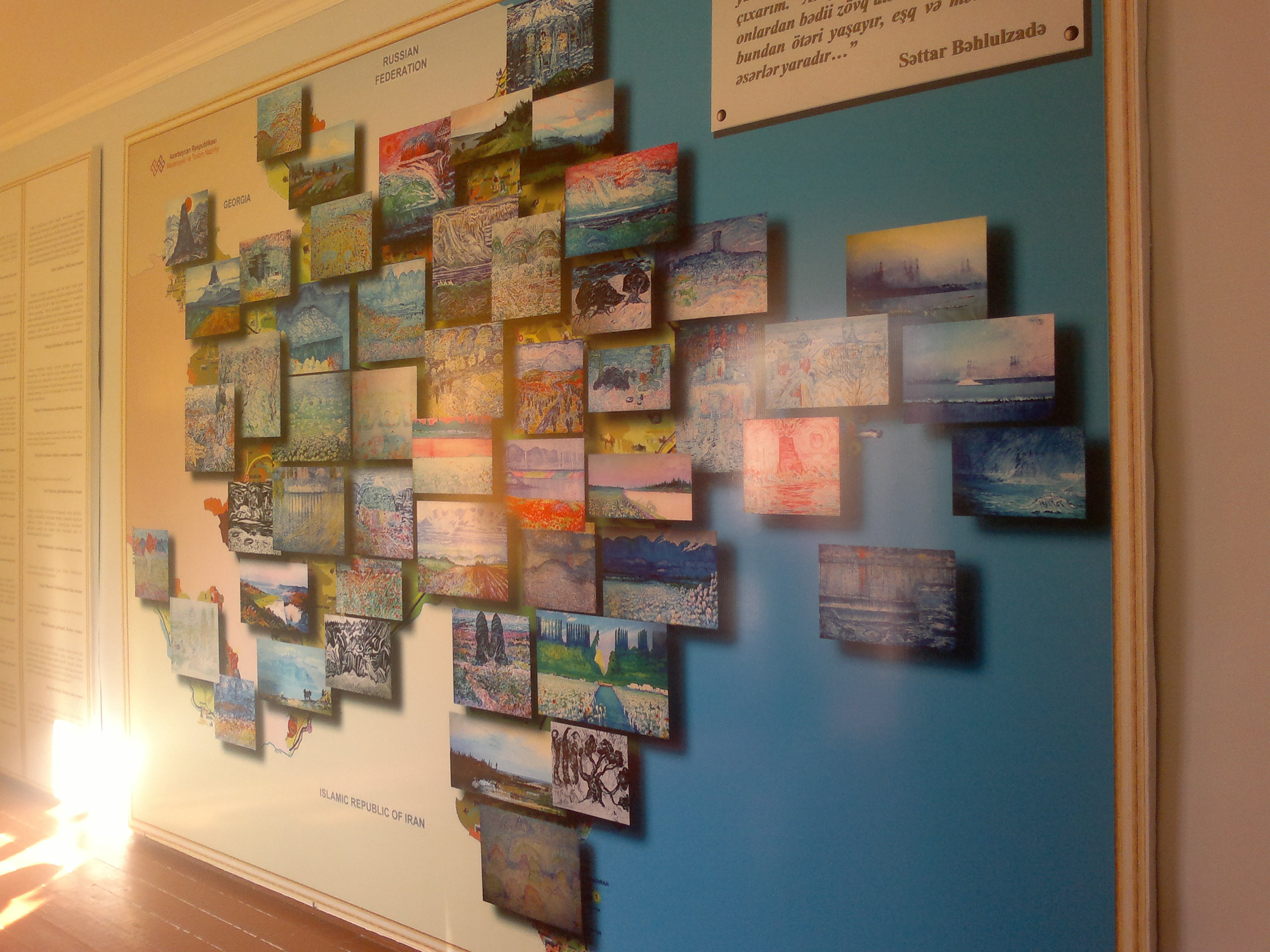
- Established: 2014
- Location: Baku, Azerbaijan
- Director: Irada Abdinova
- Website: http://bahlulzade.az/

Sattar Bahlulzade's House Museum is a house-museum created for Sattar Bahlulzade, one of the most prominent representatives of the Azerbaijani painting school, the Honored Art Worker of Azerbaijan (1960), the People's Artist of Azerbaijan (1963), and the State Prize laureate of the Azerbaijan SSR (1972).

== History ==
For the first time, Sattar Bahlulzade's House Museum was organized in a two-minaret mosque built in 1981 by oil trader Murtuza Mukhtarov in the village of Amirjan where the artist was born. There the personal things and copies of the paintings were presented.

In 1989, the artist's house-museum was closed due to the restoration of the mosques` activity, and his works and personal belongings were transferred to the Azerbaijan State Art Museum named after Rustam Mustafayev.

The museum was created in accordance with the relevant decree of the national leader Heydar Aliyev in 1994. On May 23, 2014, in the village of Amirjan, Surakhani district of Baku, the Ministry of Culture and Tourism hosted an opening ceremony after the renovation, restoration and exposition of the house-museum.

== Exposition ==
The museum consists of a two-floor house and yard. The exposition of the museum includes 5 rooms on the second floor with a corridor.

The interior includes the reproduction of the artist's "Jorat Melons", painter's brushes, dyes, the artist's press pages of various years, as well as articles published in scientific publications, together with personal and official photos and reproductions of his famous works. Congratulatory telegrams addressed to the painter on various remarkable events, catalogs of S. Bahlulzade in different languages, invitations to his personal exhibitions, personal documents and other exhibits of historical significance are displayed on the showcases. As well as the artist`s personal books, books presented by art friends to the artist, books about him also are placed on the showcases. Sattar Bahlulzadeh's works are exhibited in all rooms of the museum.

The house-museum is mostly funded by the nephew of Sattar Balulzade, Rafael Abdinov. In 2014, Sattar Bahlulzadeh's personal exhibition consisting of the artist`s graphic works, which were not exhibited anywhere as of that time and were kept in private collections, has been held.

The catalog of cartoons by S.Bahlulzadeh which were published in “Kommunist” newspaper between 1931 and 1933, was prepared and published, at the same time an exhibition of these cartoons was held.

== Gallery ==
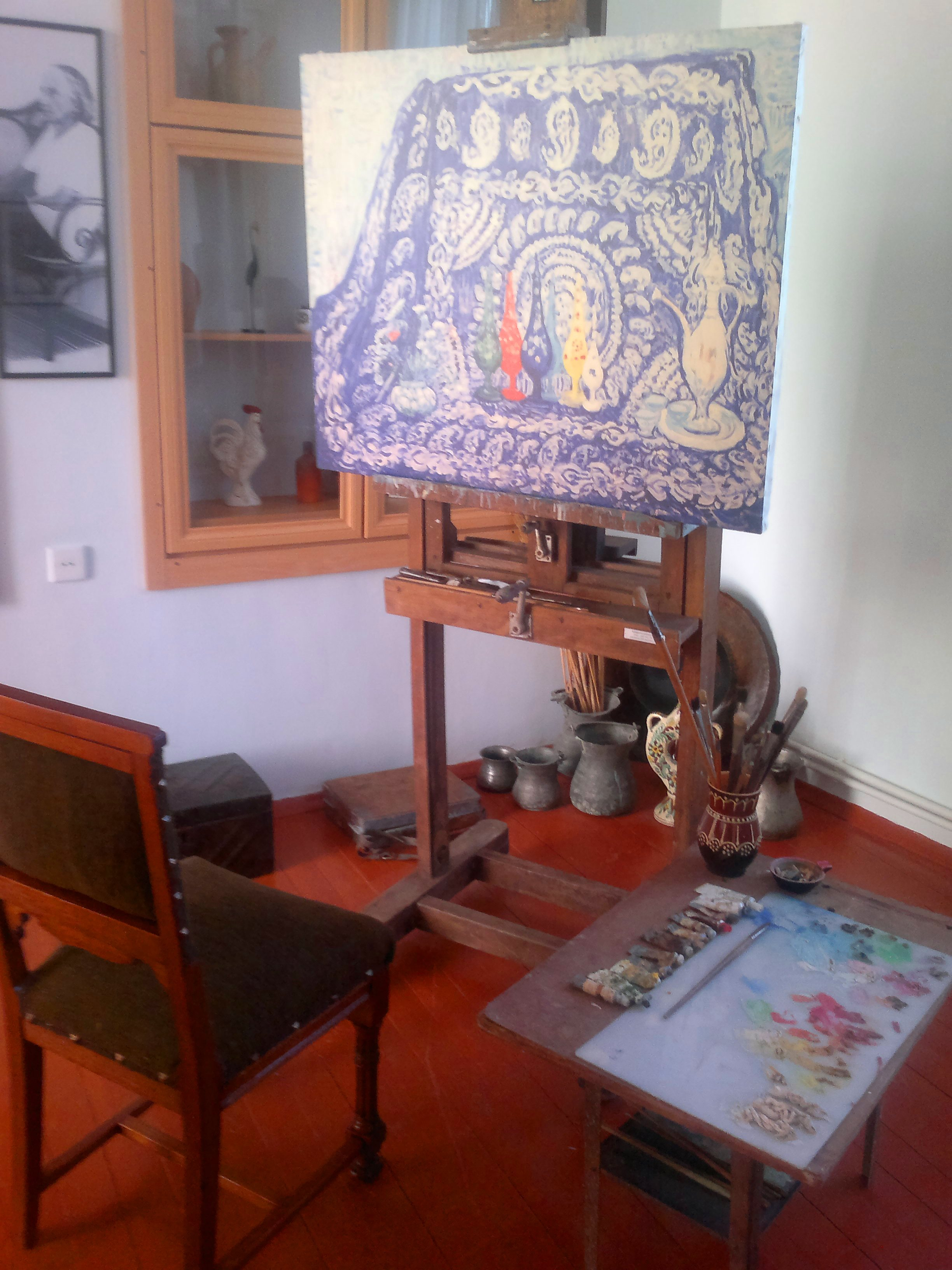
The artist's workshop

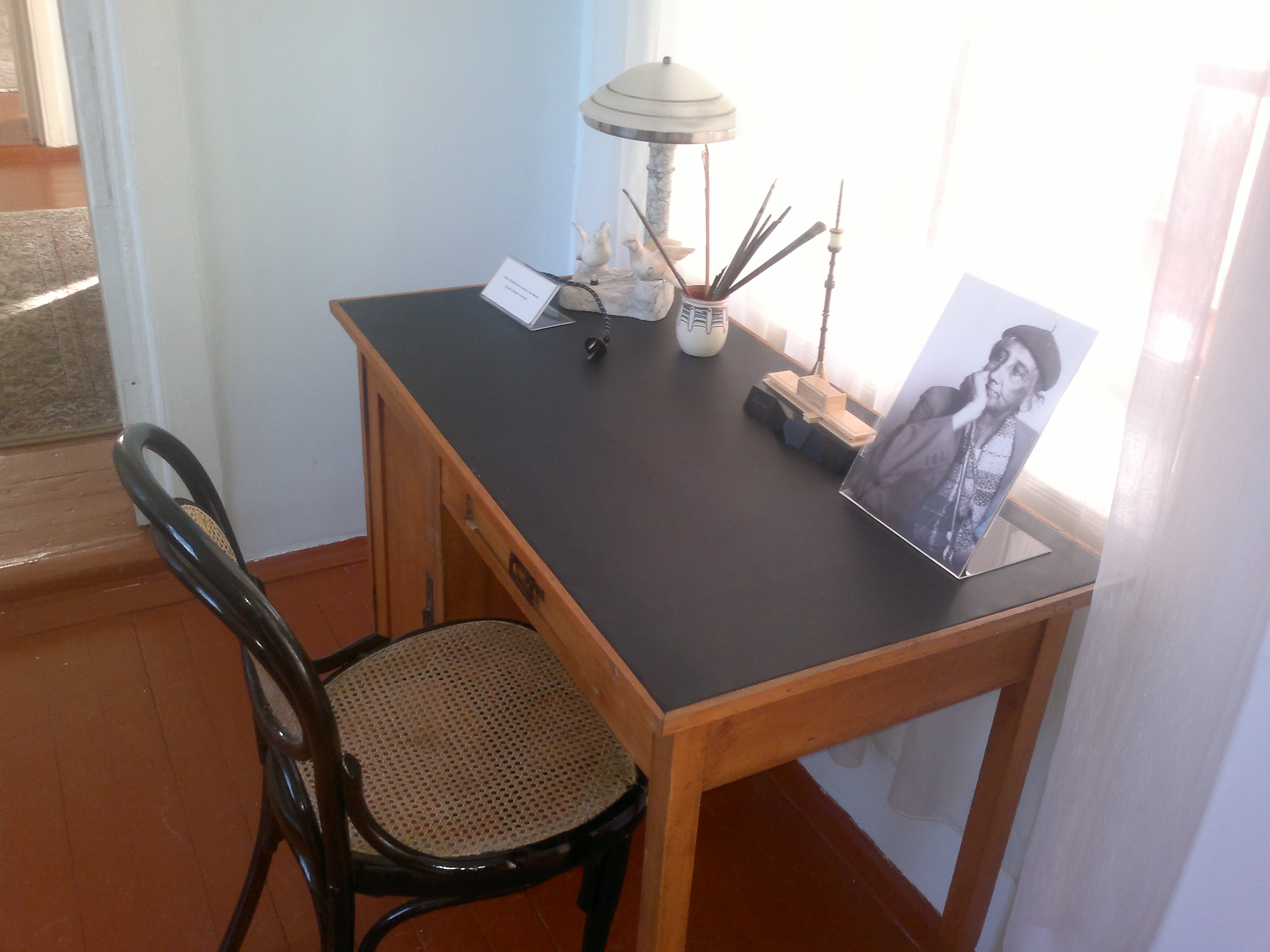
The artist's desk

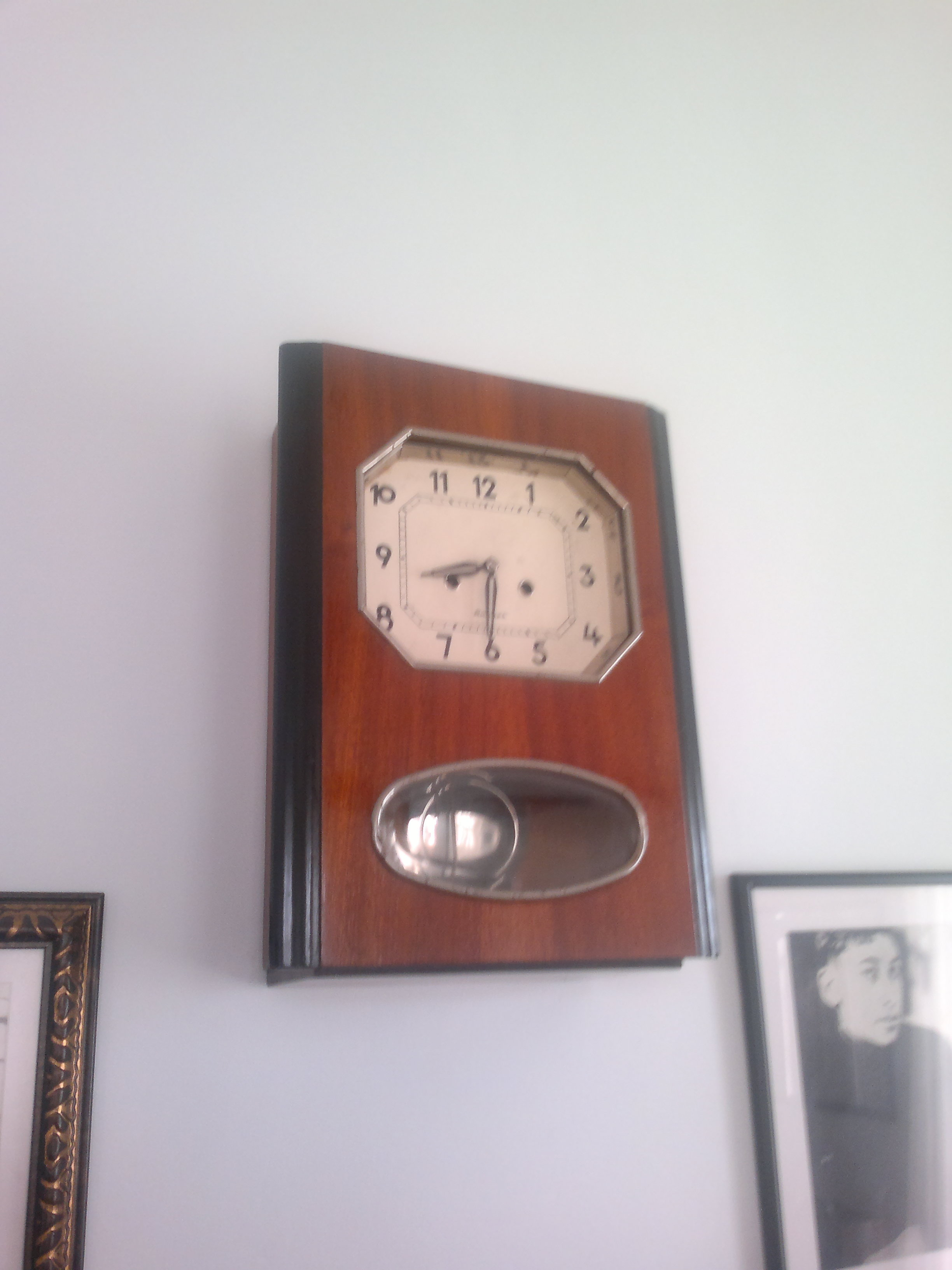

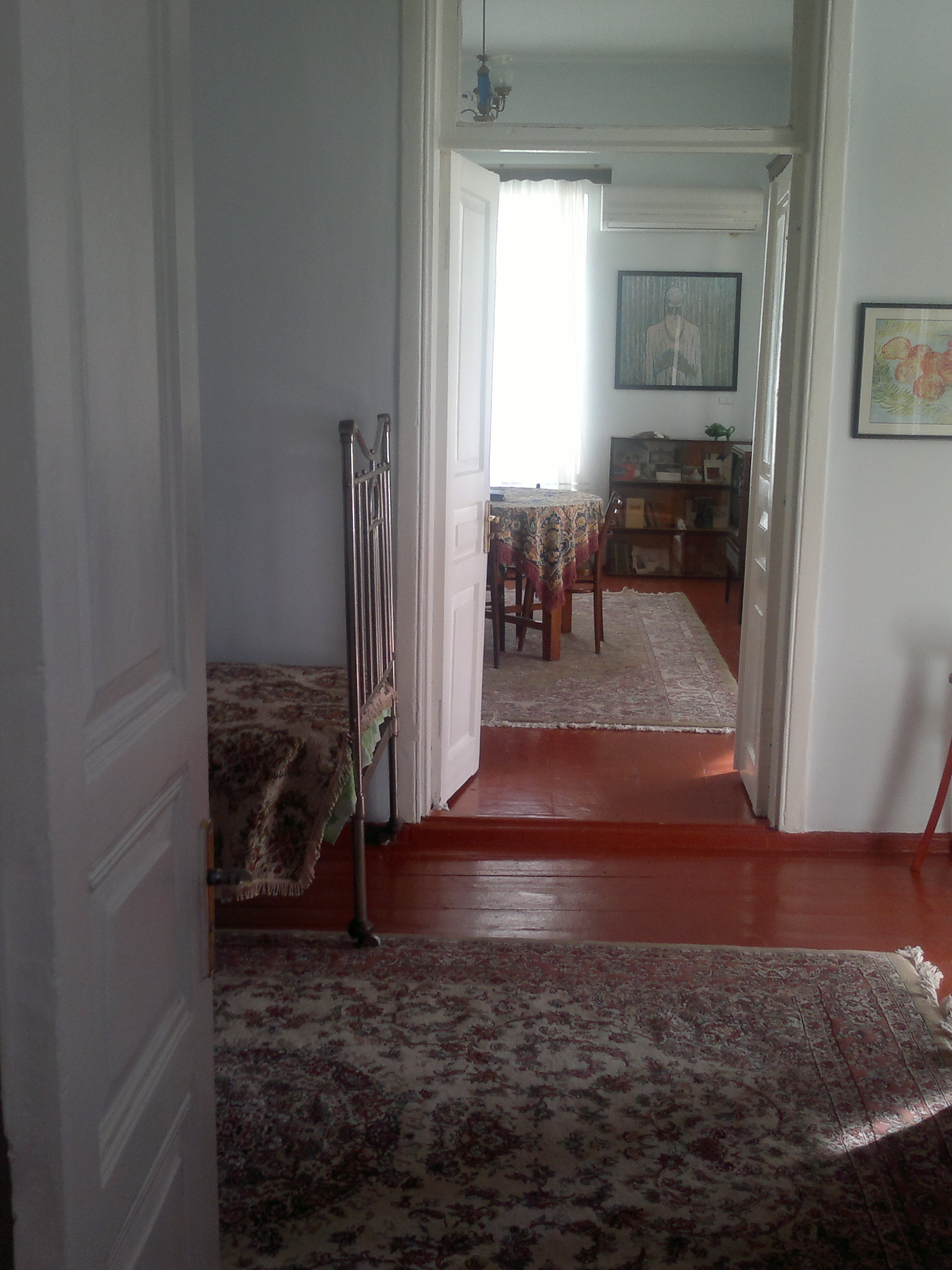

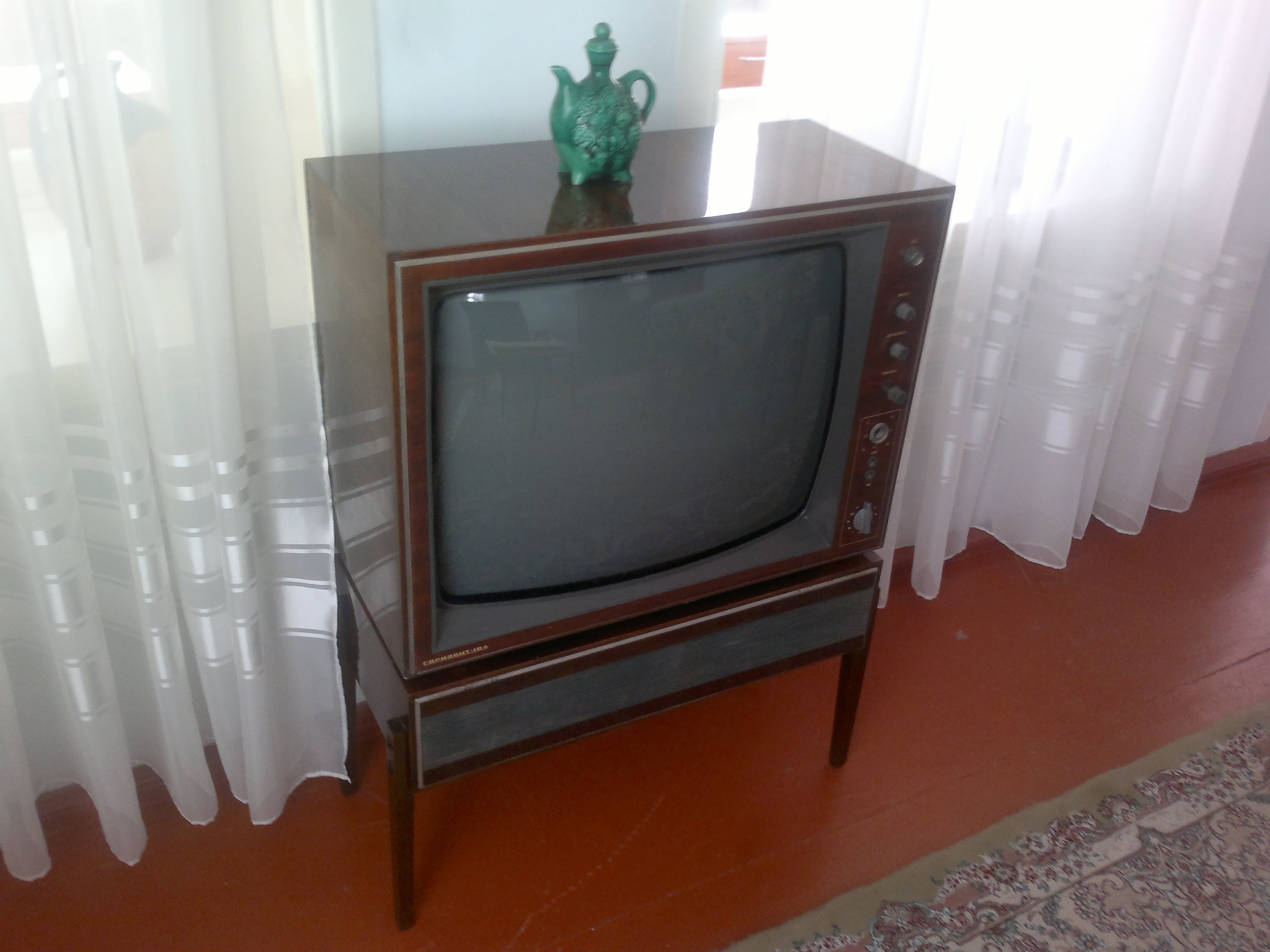

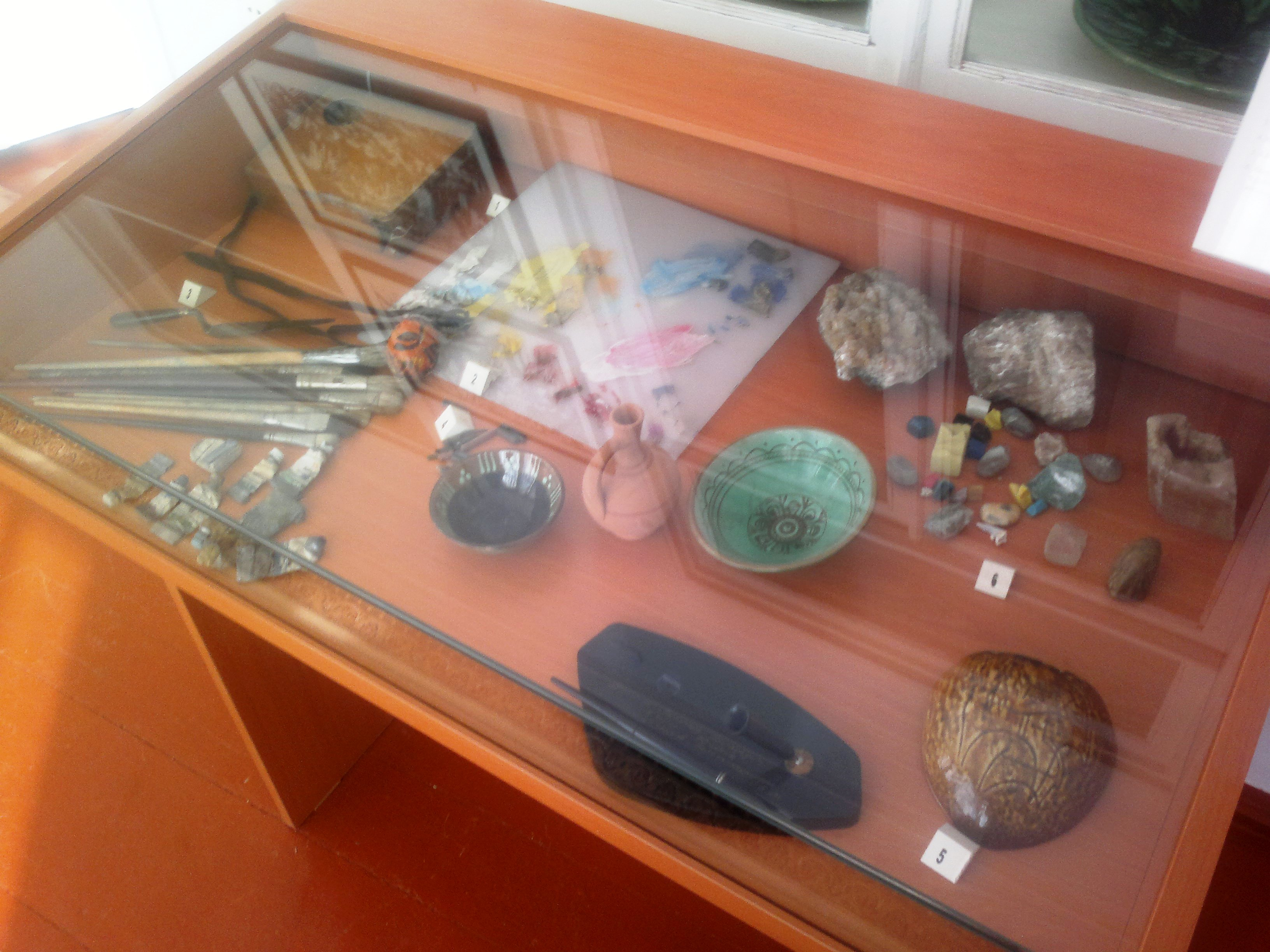

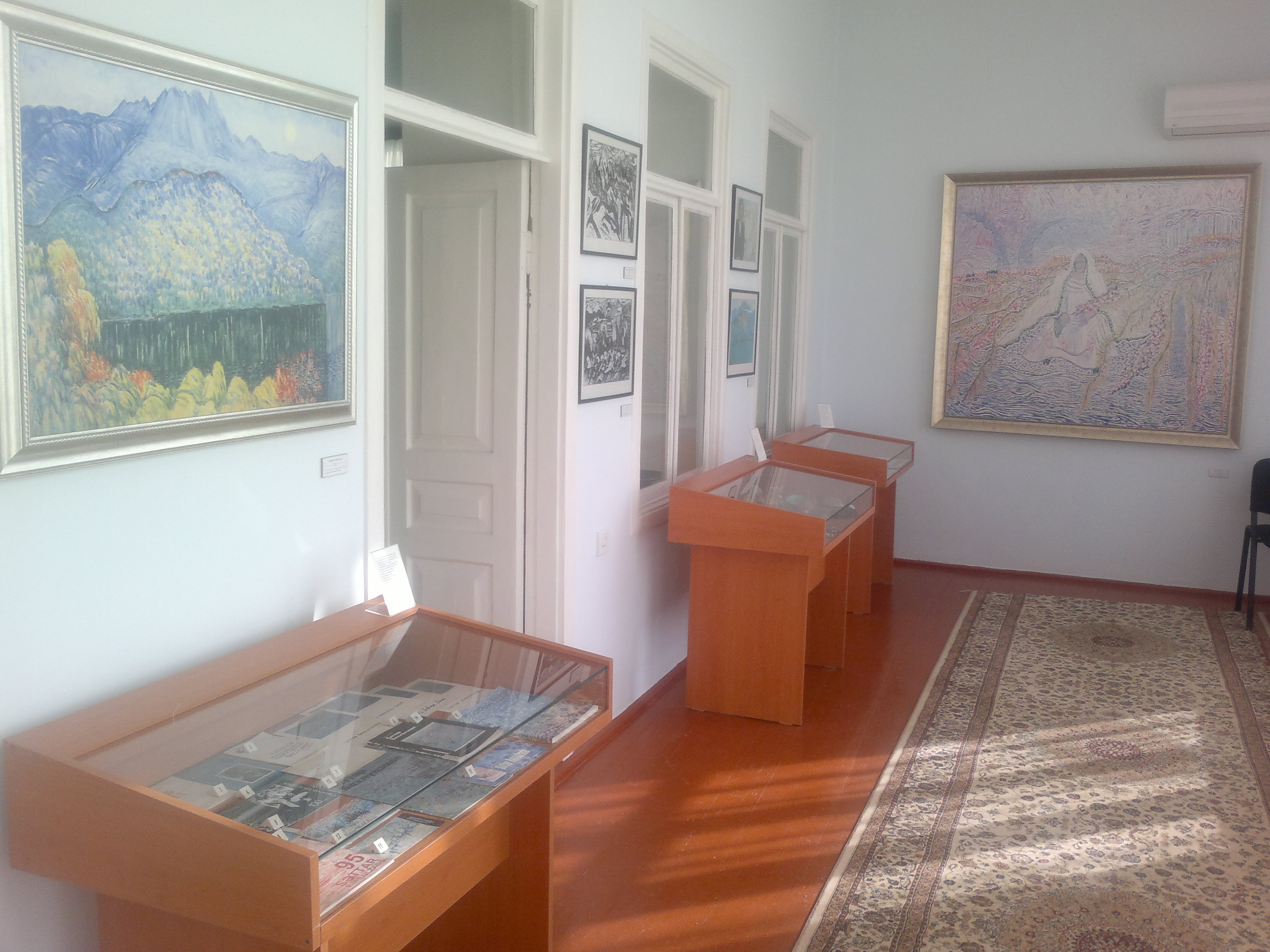

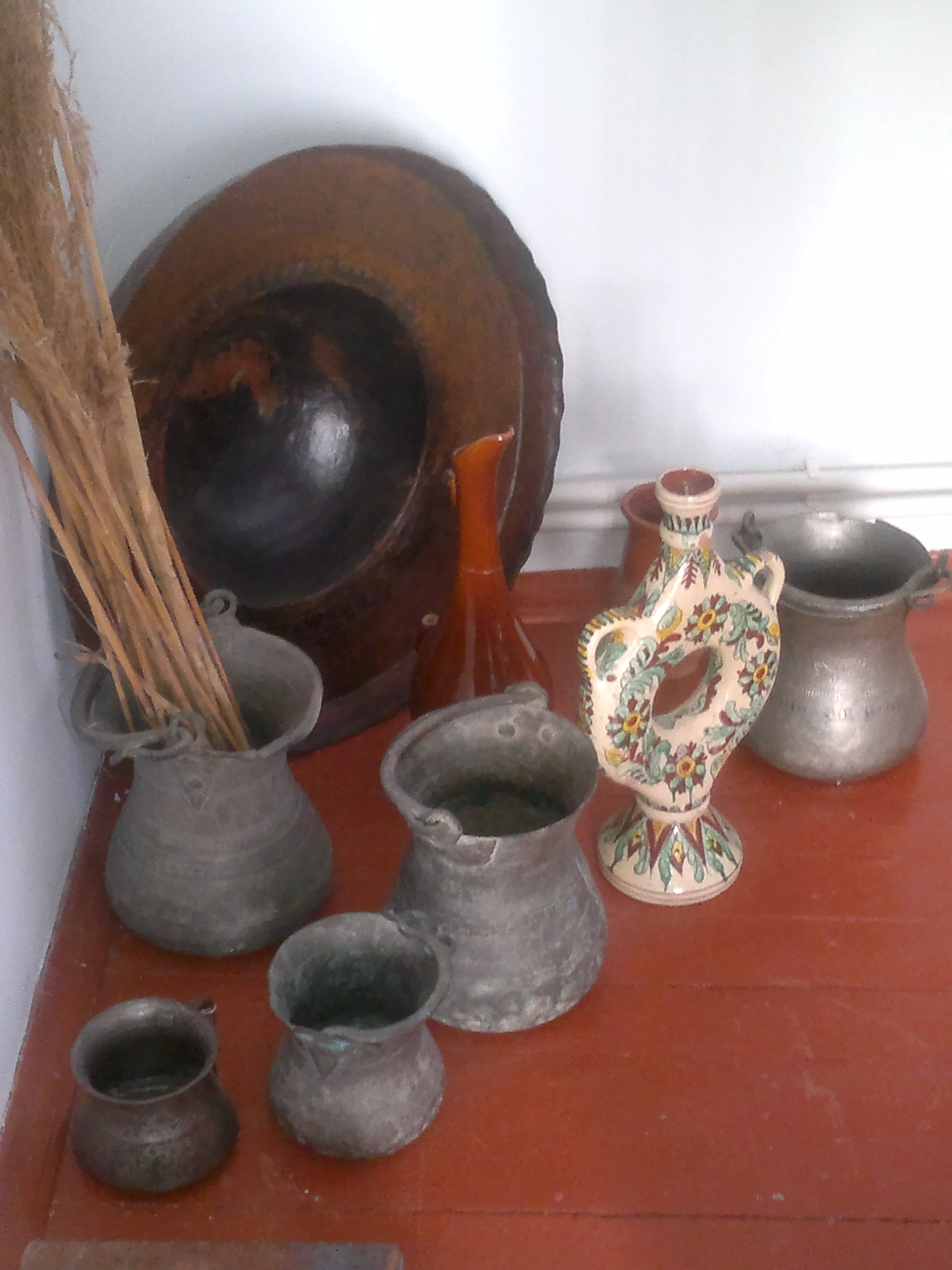

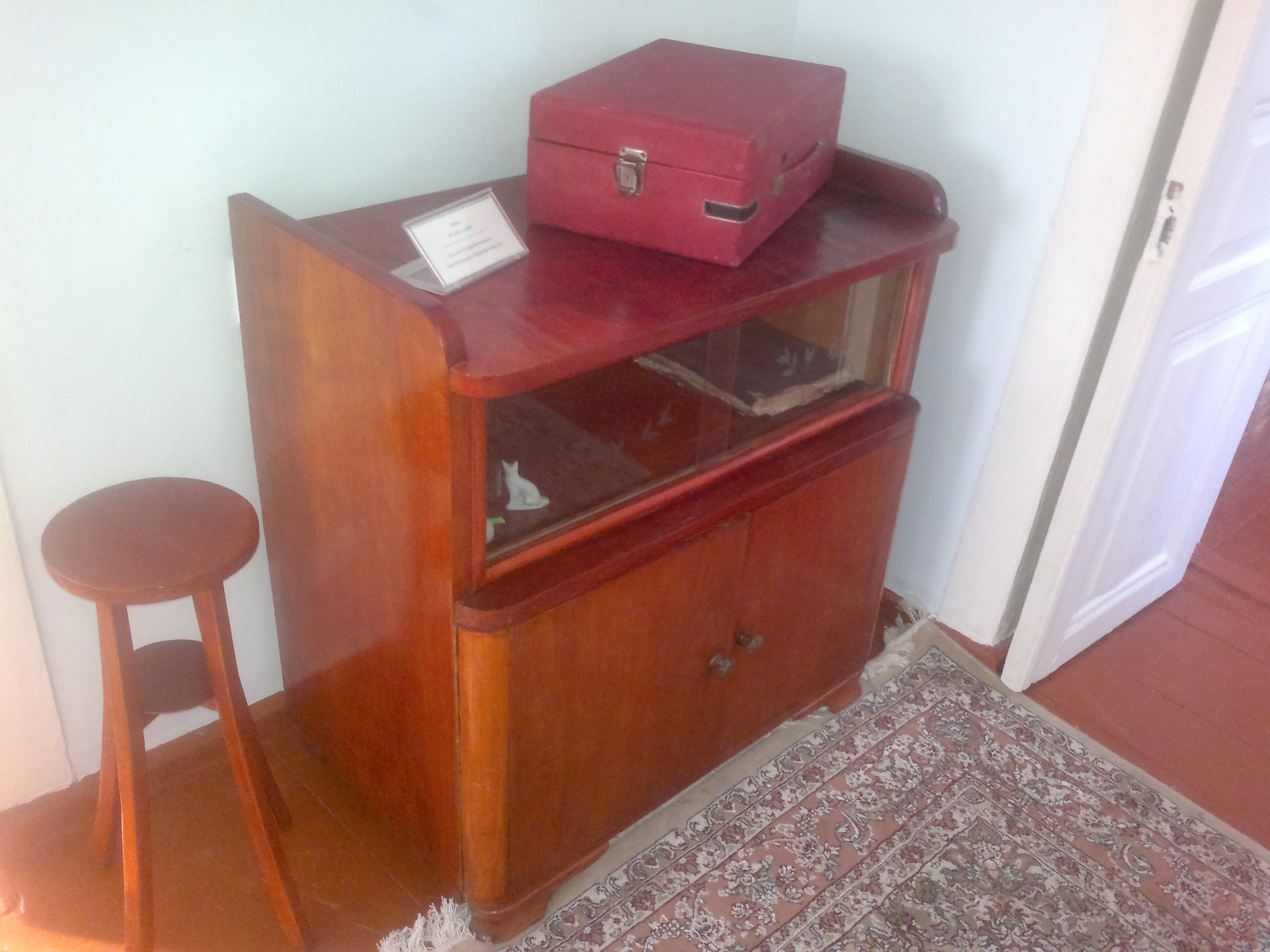

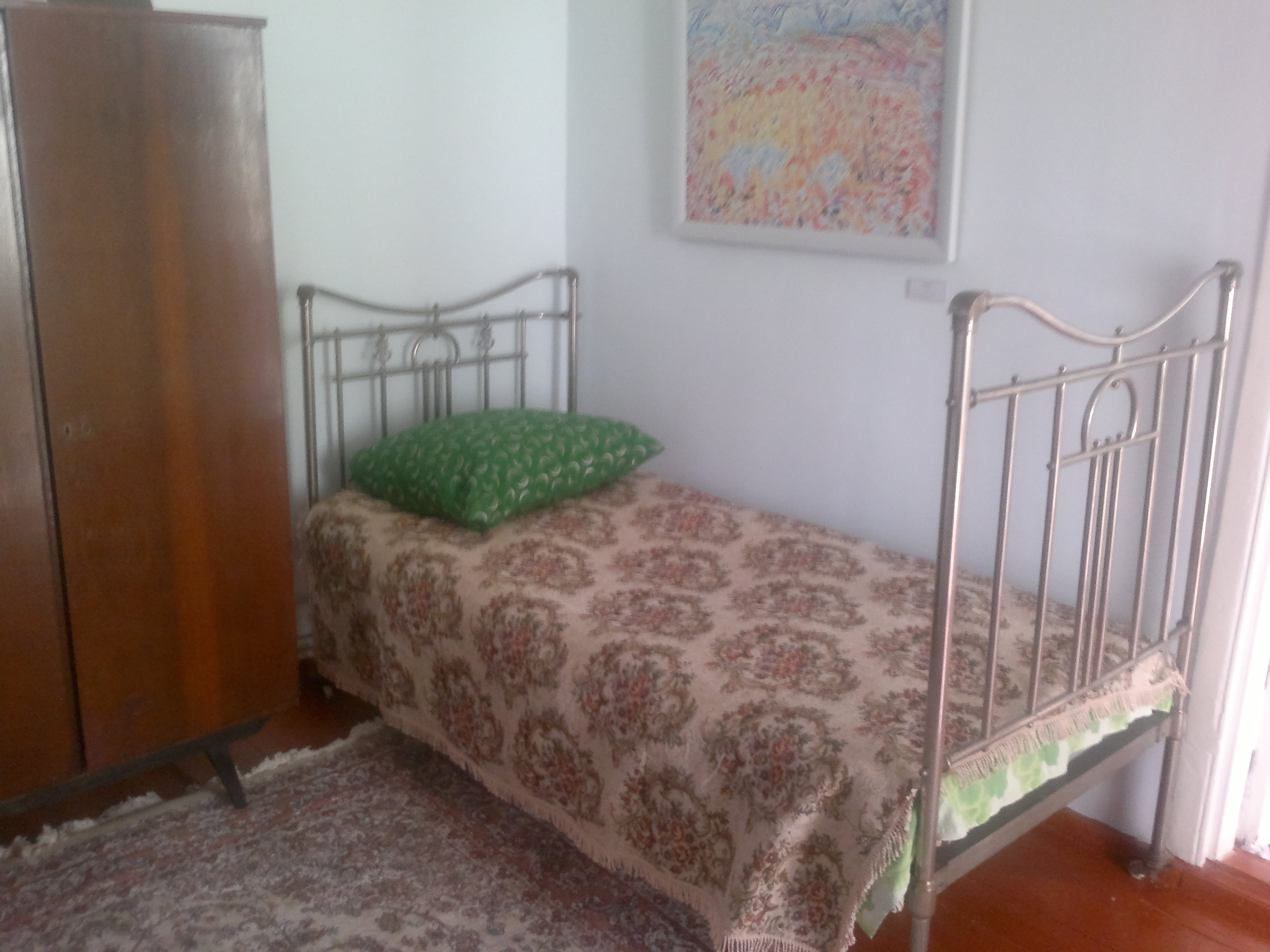
