= House-Museum of Mammed Said Ordubadi (Baku) =

- Məmməd Səid Ordubadinin ev muzeyi (Azerbaijani)
- Established: 1979
- Location: Khagani street 19, Baku, Azerbaijan
- Coordinates: 40°22′22″N 49°50′35″E

House-Museum of Mammed Said Ordubadi is a museum created in the house where well-known Azerbaijani writer Mammed Said Ordubadi lived and worked. The museum is located in Khagani street 19, Baku.

== History ==
The museum was founded according to the decree issued on June 16, 1976, by the directive bodies of the Azerbaijan Soviet Socialist Republic on October 31, 1979, in the apartment where the writer lived from 1938 until the end of his life. The museum is currently under the control of the Ministry of Culture and Tourism of the Republic of Azerbaijan.

== Exposition ==
Nearly 2000 exhibits were collected in the museum's fund. 300 of them are exhibited at the exposition of the museum. The exposition is located in two rooms with a total area of 60 m². The first room was his office as well as the dining room. The writer's collection of paintings, photographs, graphics and oil paintings, and books were collected in the first room. The appearance of the room is preserved as it was in the last few moments of the writer's life.

The second room reflects all the activity of Mammed Said Ordubadi. Here there are examples of books, manuscripts, newspapers and magazines published since the early twentieth century. The audience can also get acquainted with the model of the house where the writer was born in Nakhchivan.
