= House-Museum of Nariman Narimanov =

- Nəriman Nərimanovun xatirə muzeyi (Azerbaijani)
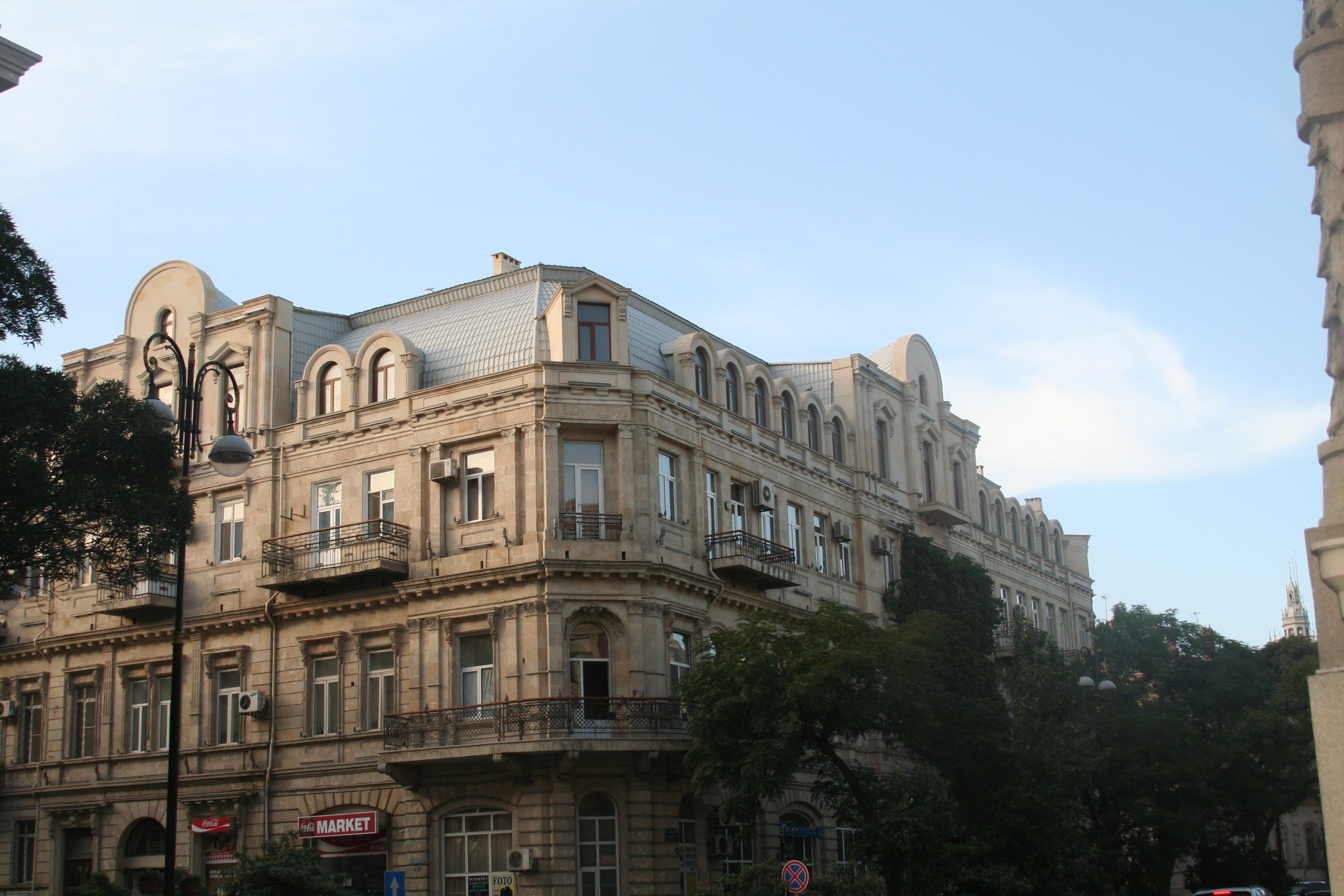
- Established: 1977
- Location: Baku, Azerbaijan
- Coordinates: 40°22′N 49°50′E

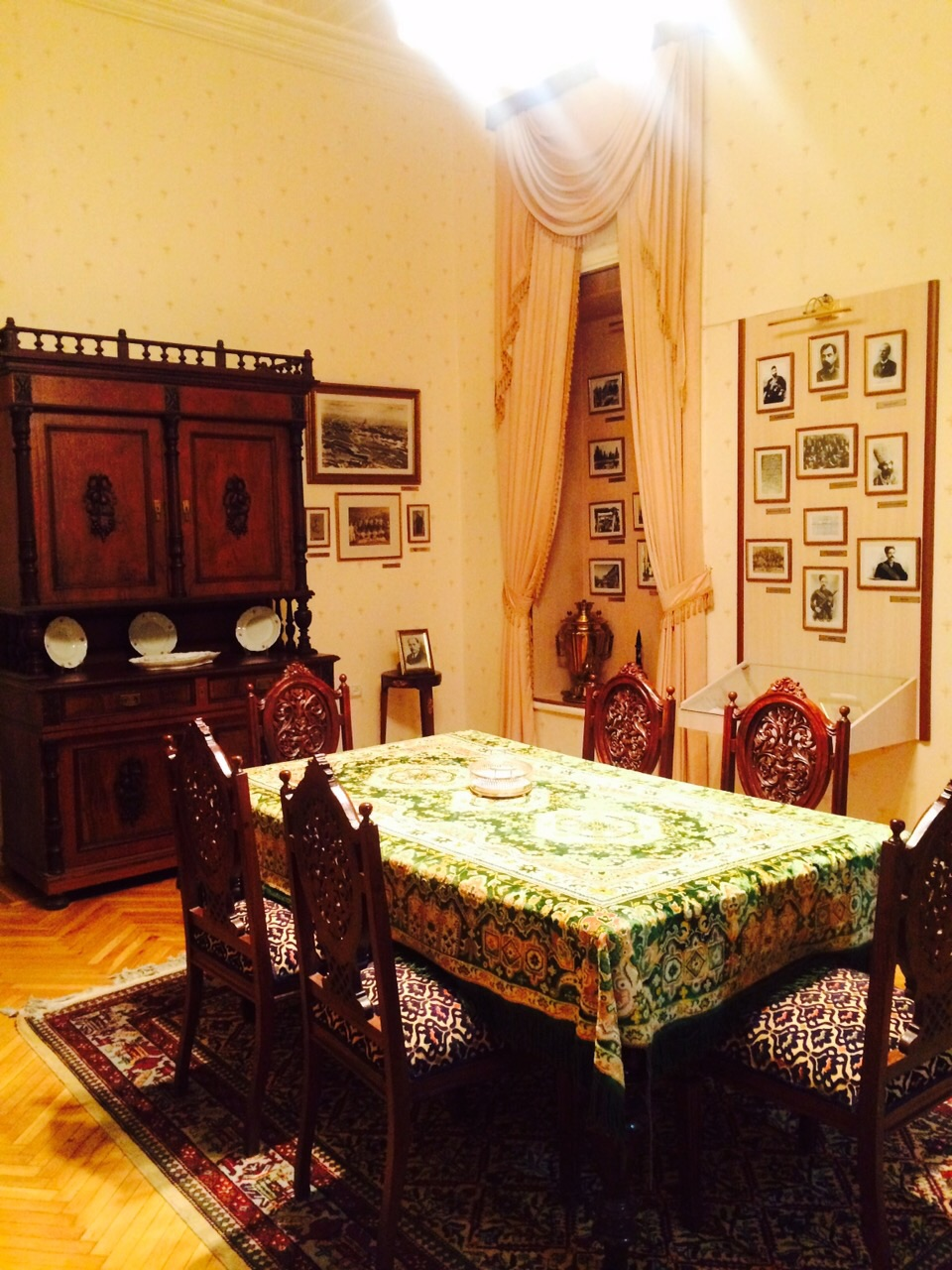
Dining room in the museum

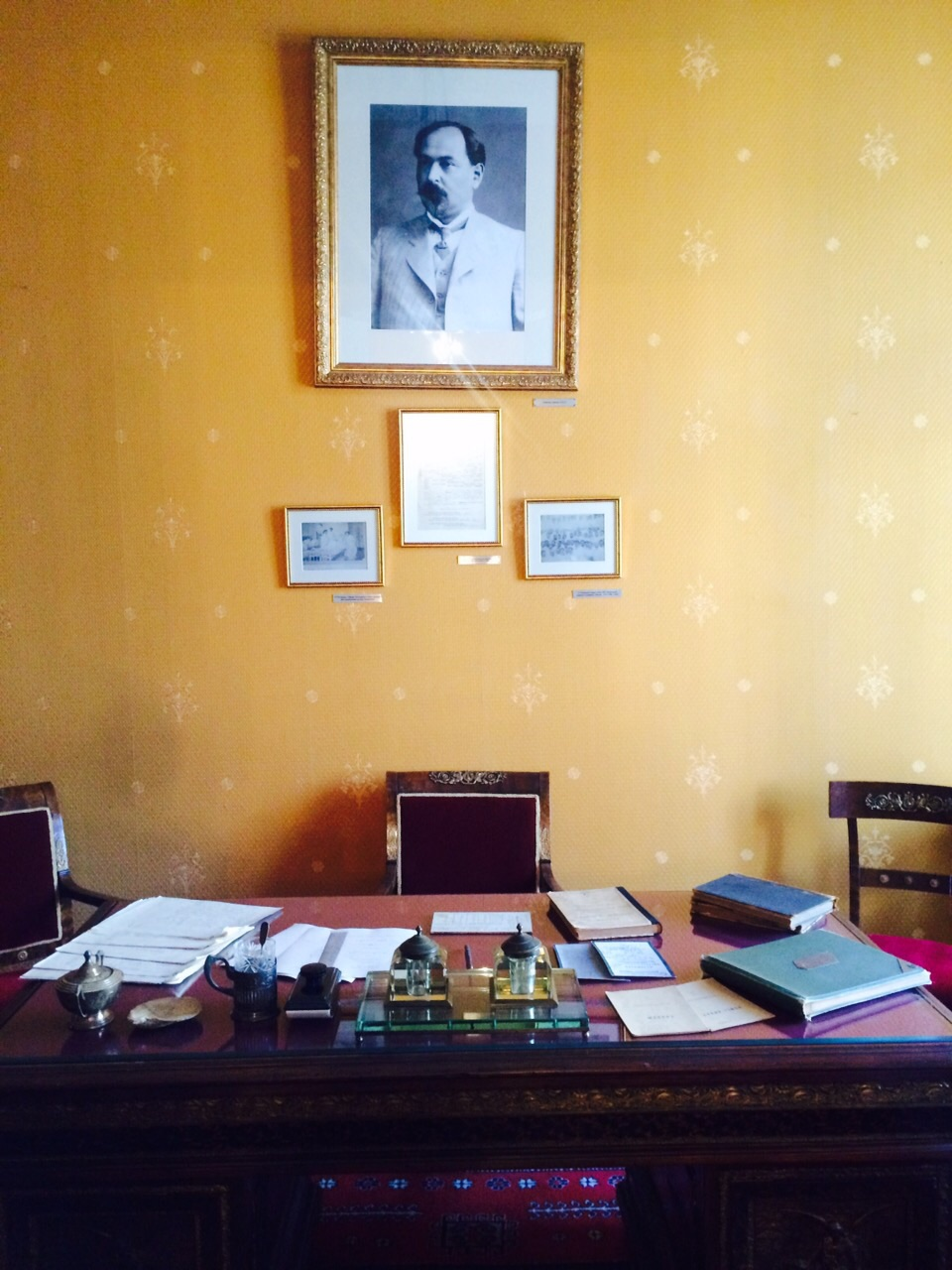
House-Museum of Nariman Narimanov

The House-Museum of Nariman Narimanov was opened in Baku, Azerbaijan, on November 6, 1977. Nariman Narimanov lived in the apartment together with his family during 1913–1918.

== Exhibition ==
The exhibition area of the museum consists of four rooms: dining room, doctor's cabinet, guest and bedroom. Exhibits in these rooms present Nariman Narimanov's activity as public-political, literary, enlightenment, medicine, publicist, diplomat, and statesman.

The first room of the exposition reflects documents and materials belong to Narimanov's childhood and youth. Certificate of birth of N. Narimanov, Certificate of completion of Gori Teachers' Seminary, documents on teaching activity at the village of Kizilhajili, model of his house in Tbilisi, doctoral diploma are displayed in this house-museum.

The second room of the exposition reflects the documents and materials of N. Narimanov's social-political activity covering the first decades of the 20th century.

The exhibit in the third room shows documents and materials about Narimanov's souvenirs, furniture, chandelier, letter written to his son Najaf, documents and materials about N. Narimanov's and his son's death, as well as documents mentioning the perpetuation of N. Narimanov's name.

The fourth room of the museum is a medical cabinet. N. Narimanov's medical devices, the wardrobe stored in the medicines, the hangings, the tables illuminate his activity as a doctor. More than five thousand different exhibits, original documents and materials, memories, genealogy of Narimanov's family and other objects are kept in the museum's collection.

== Gallery ==
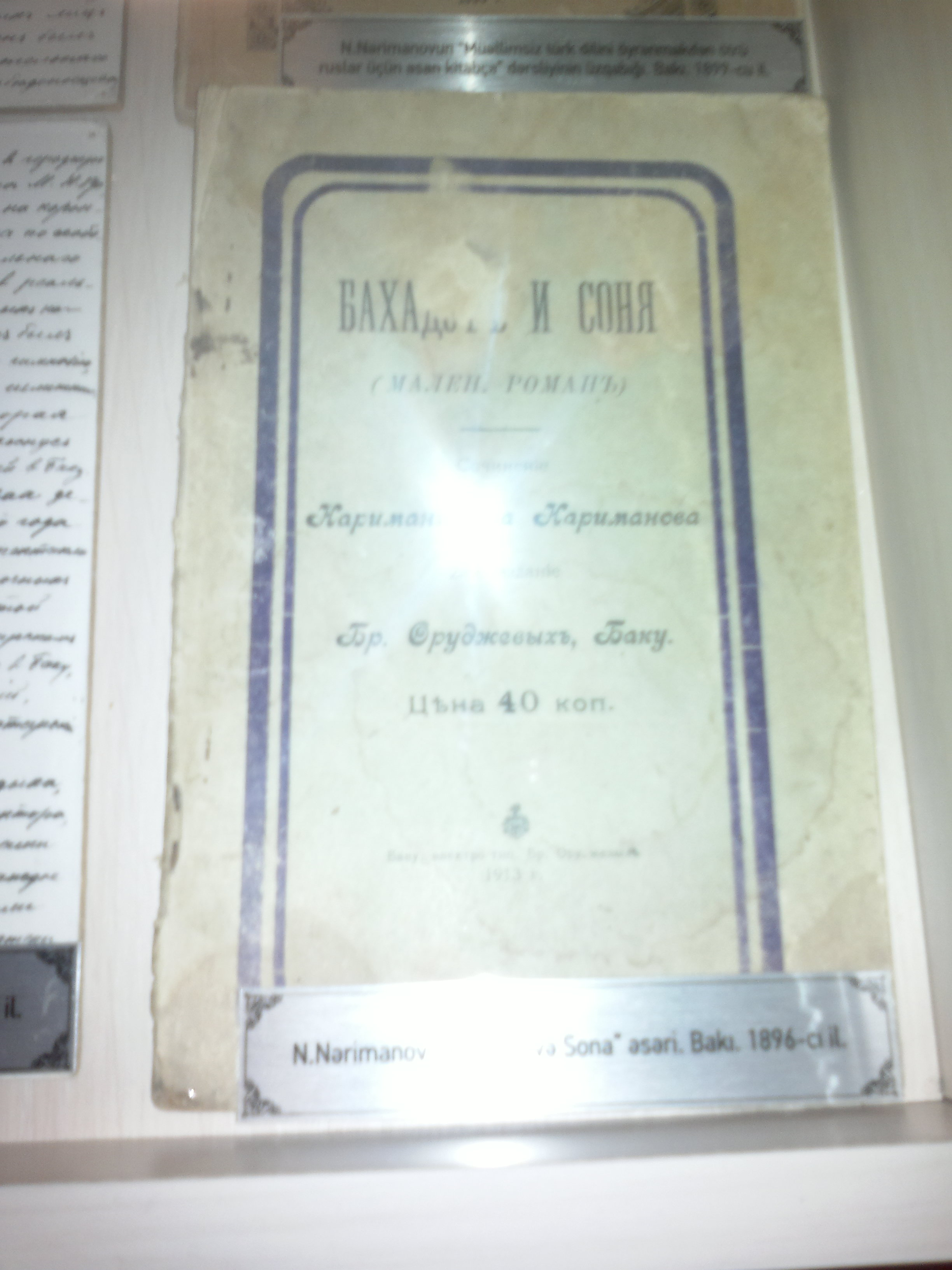

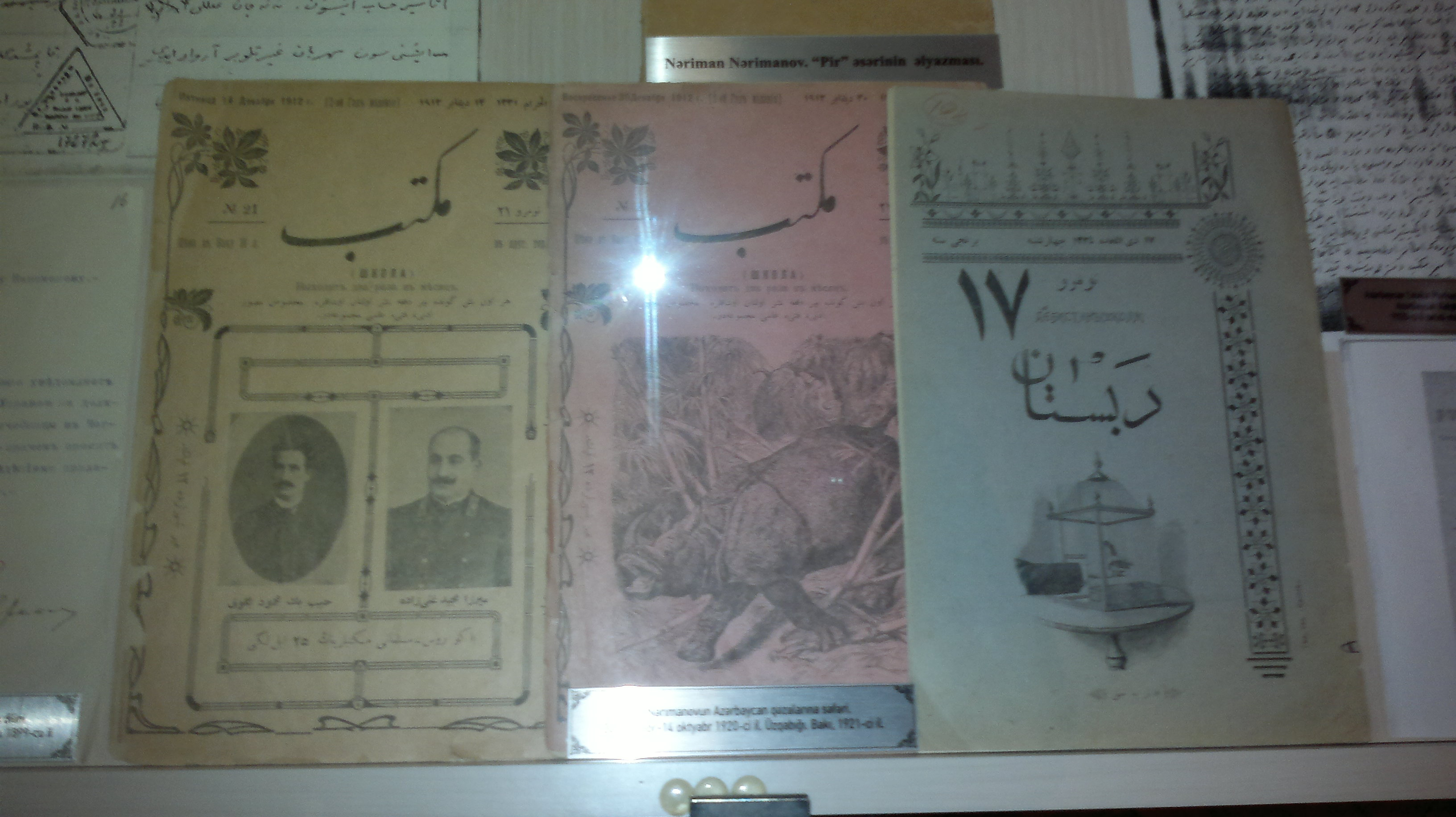

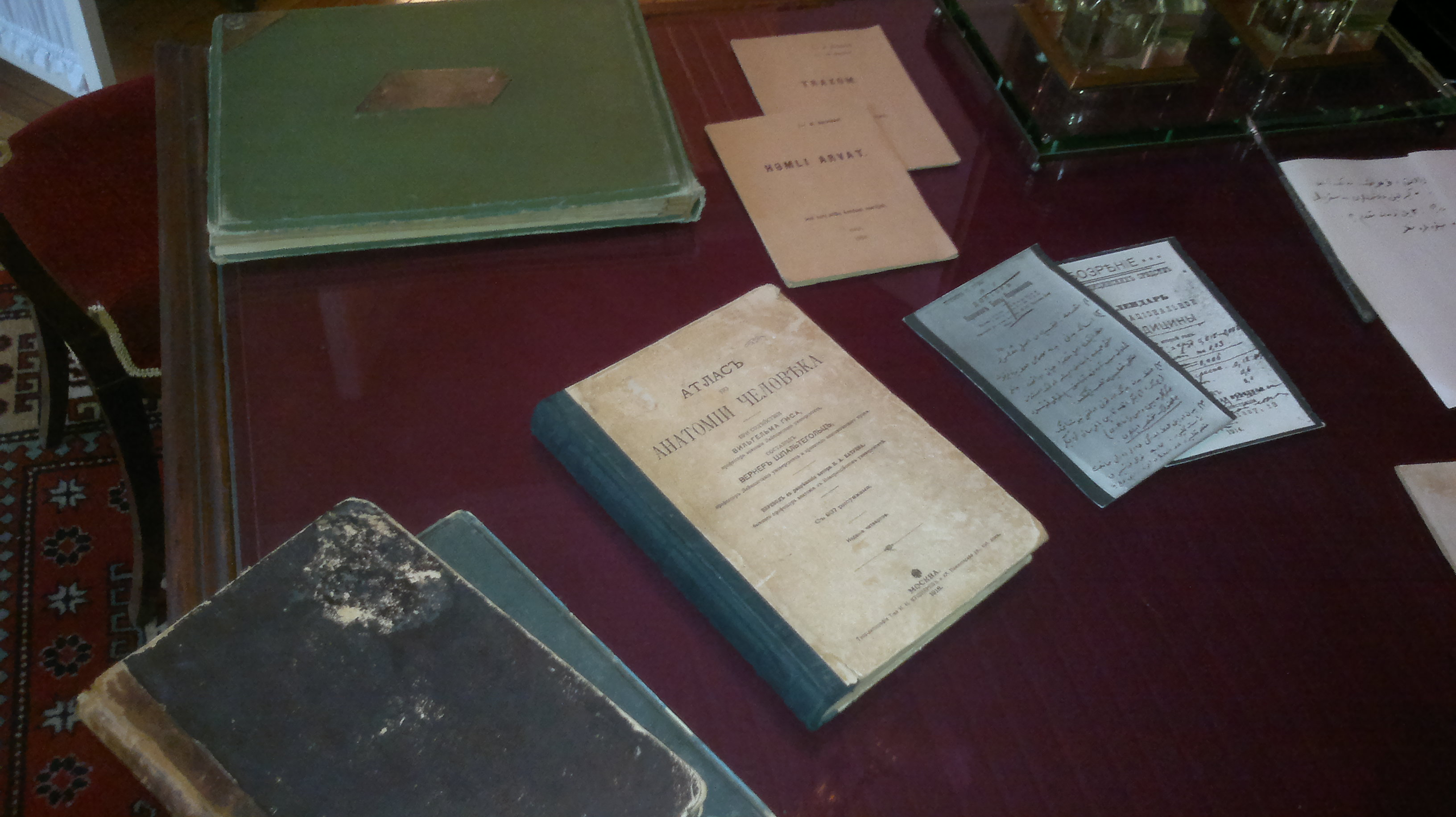

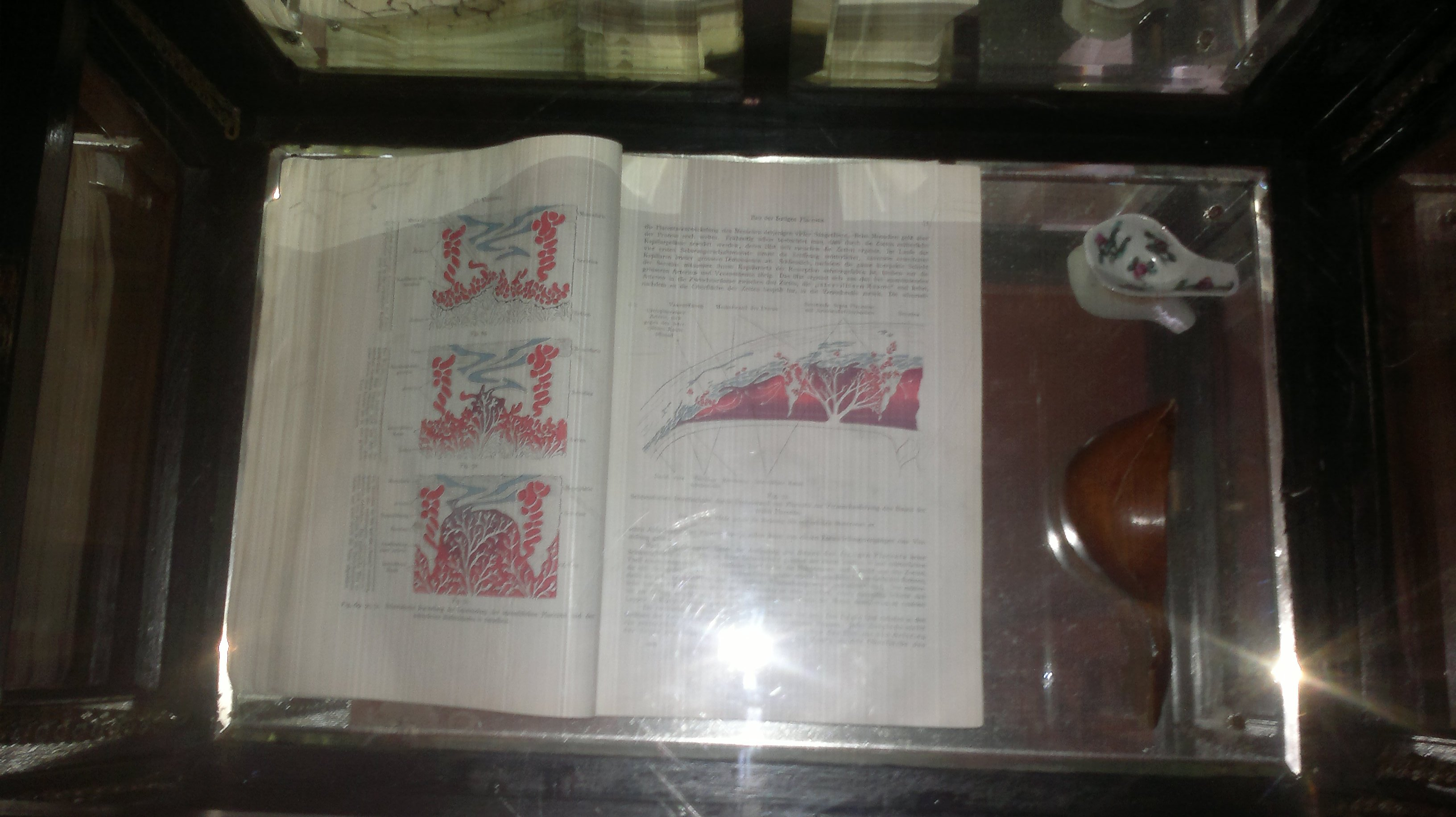

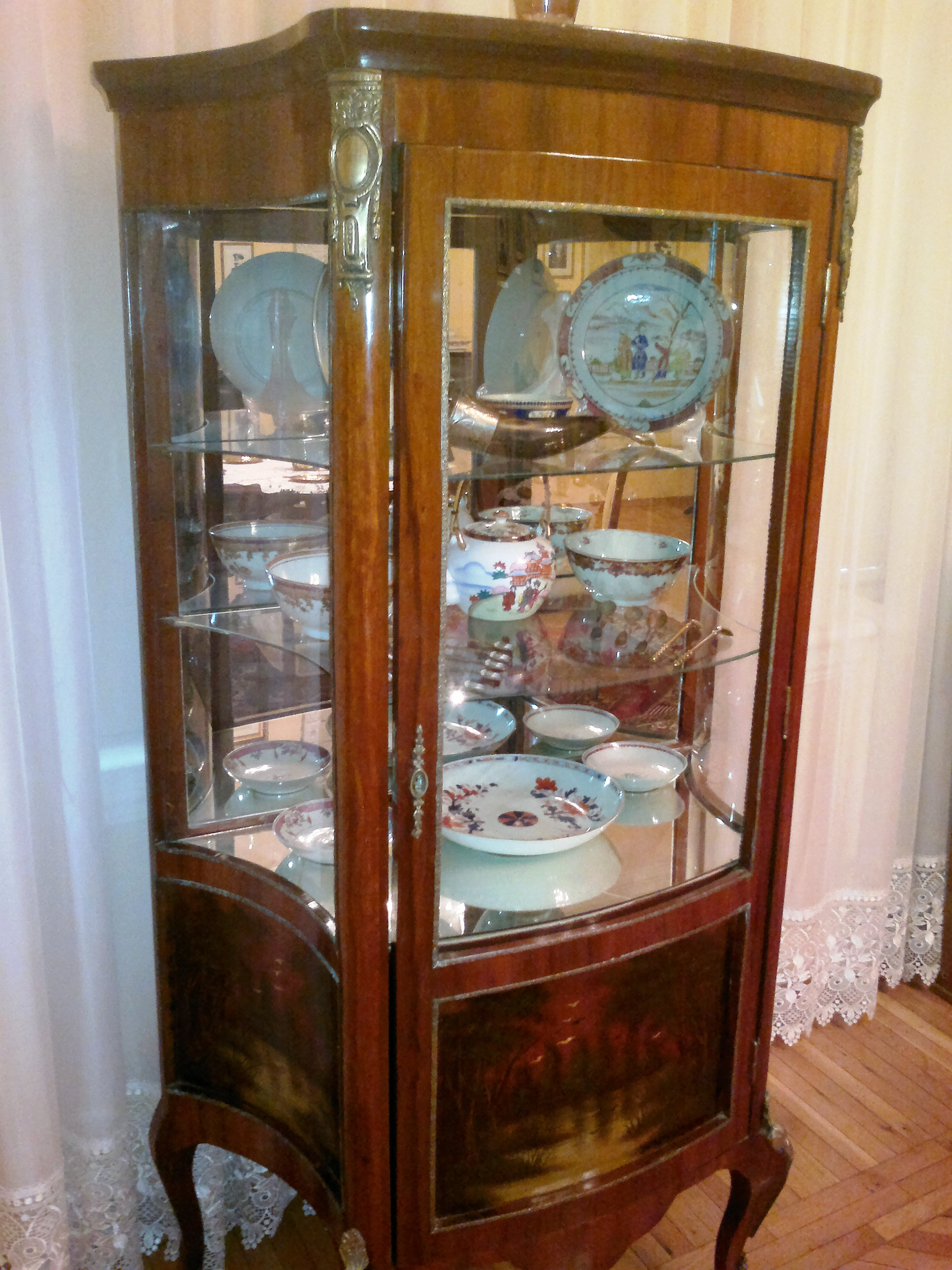

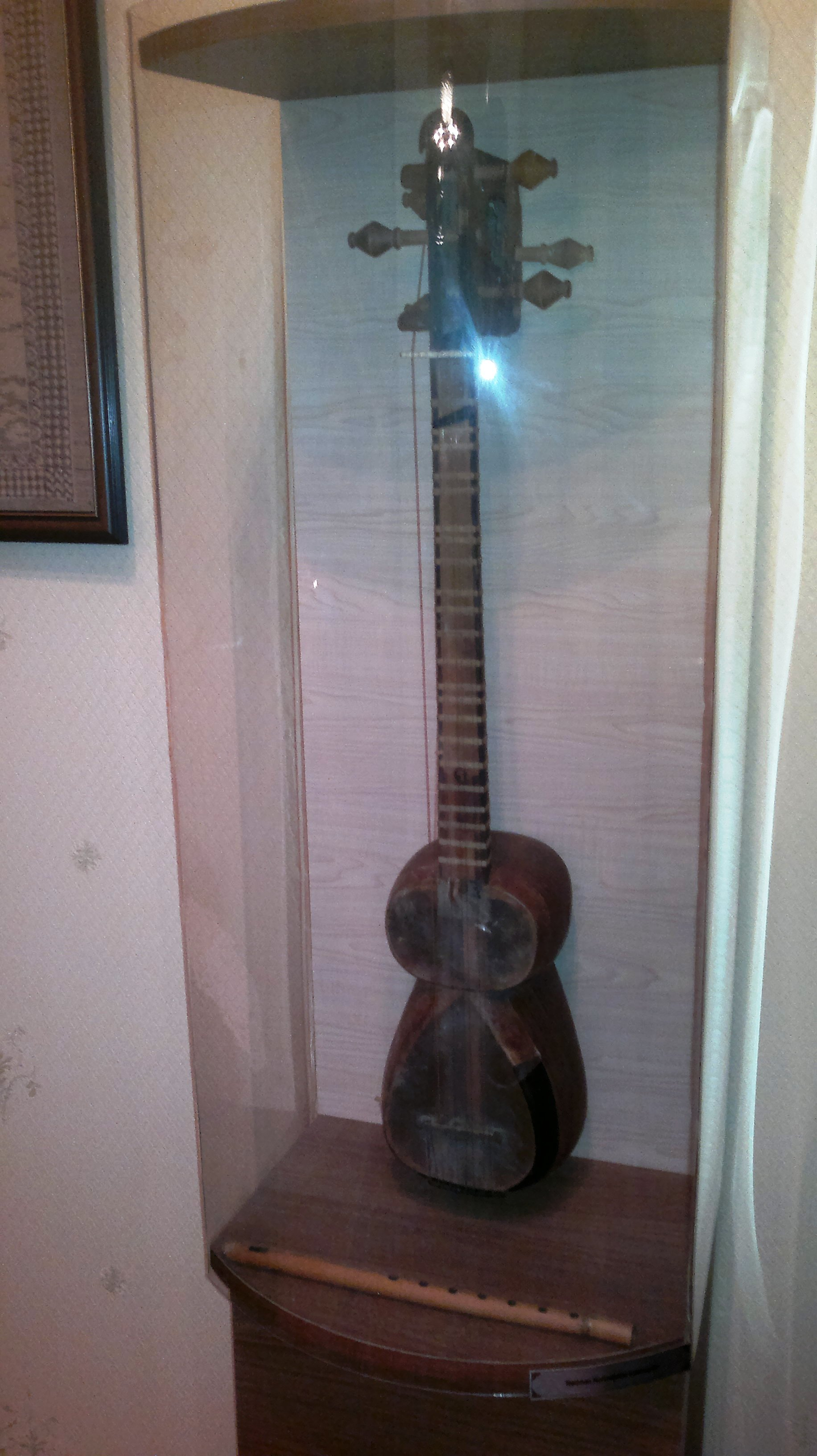

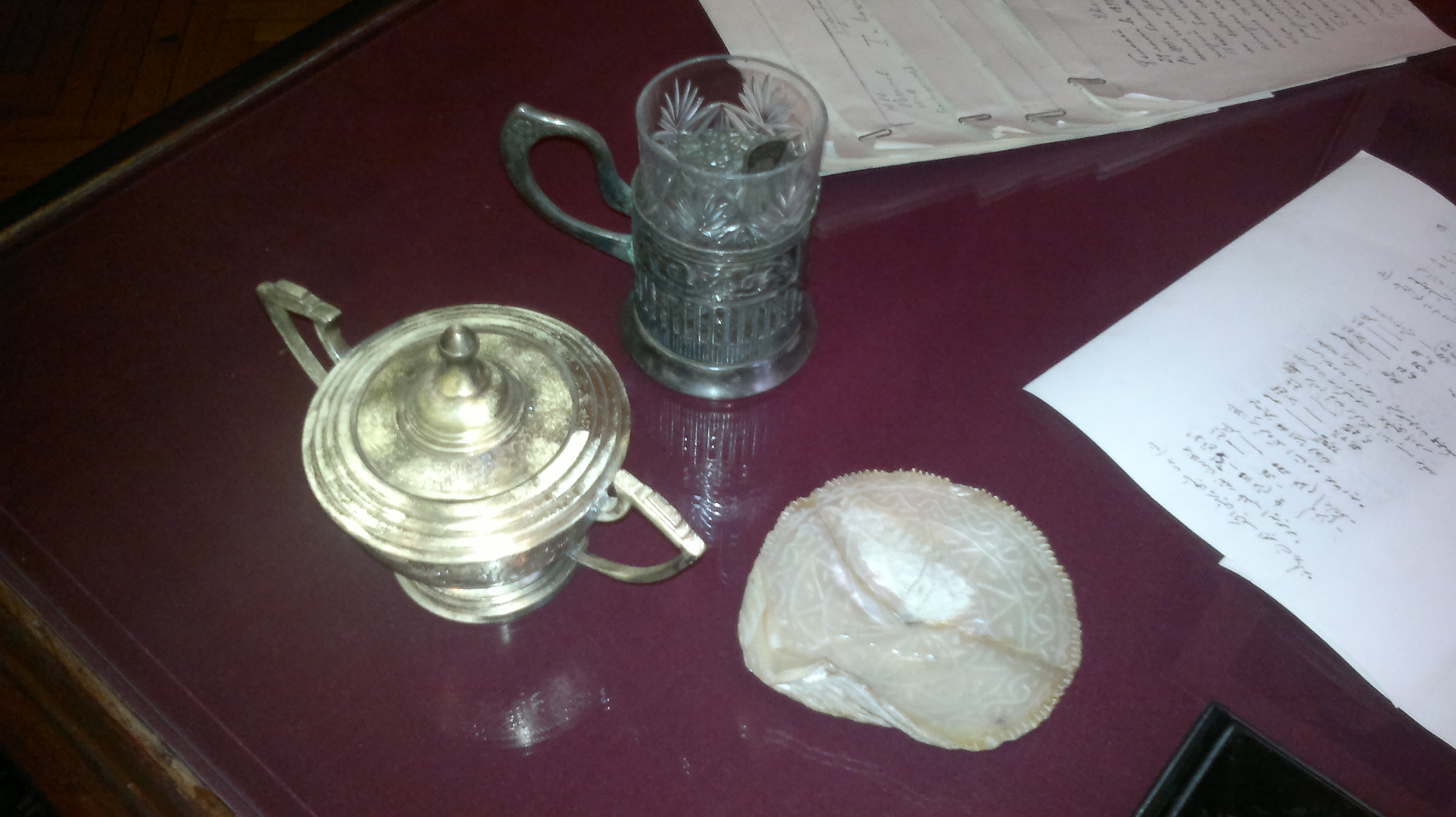

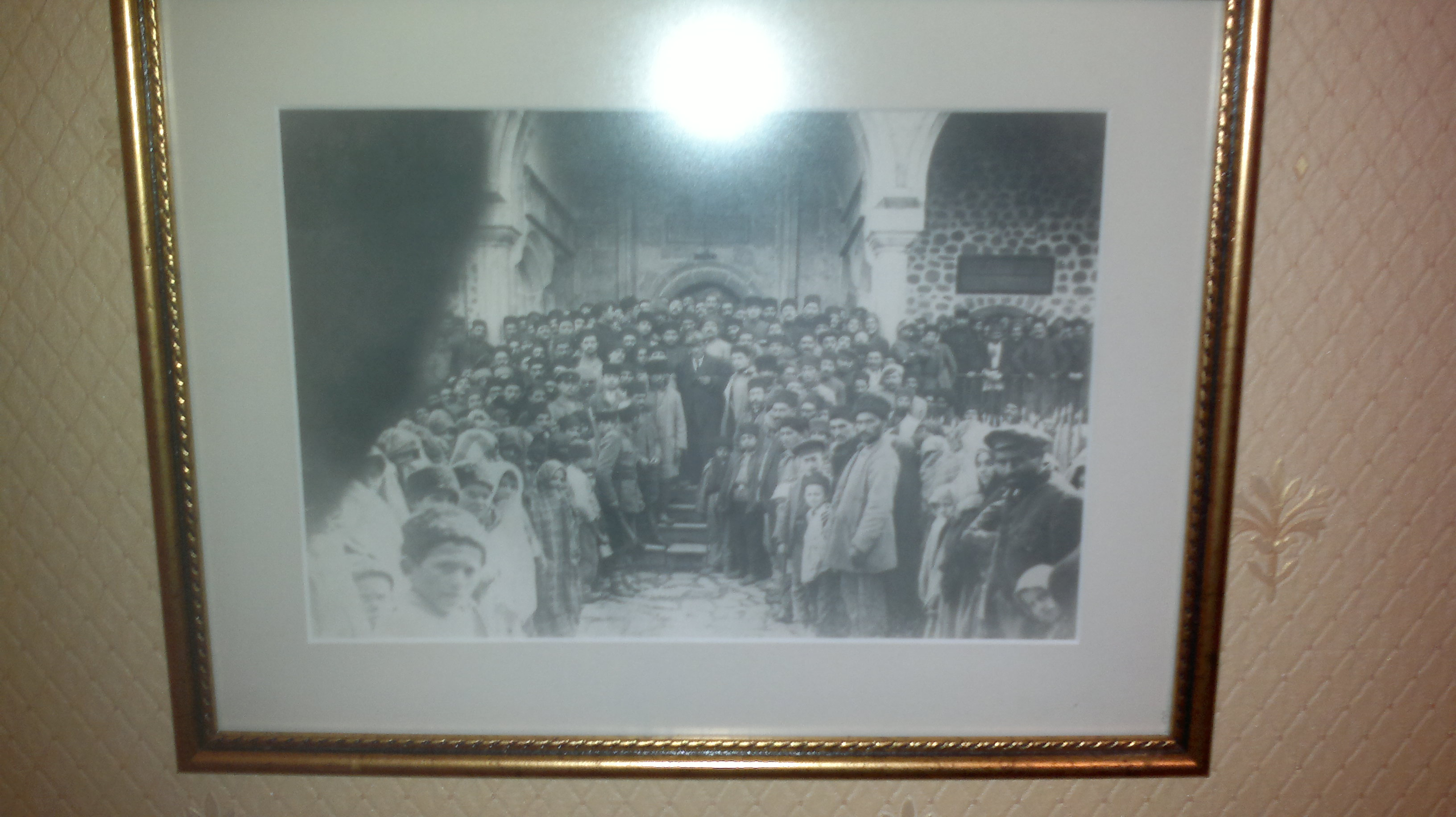

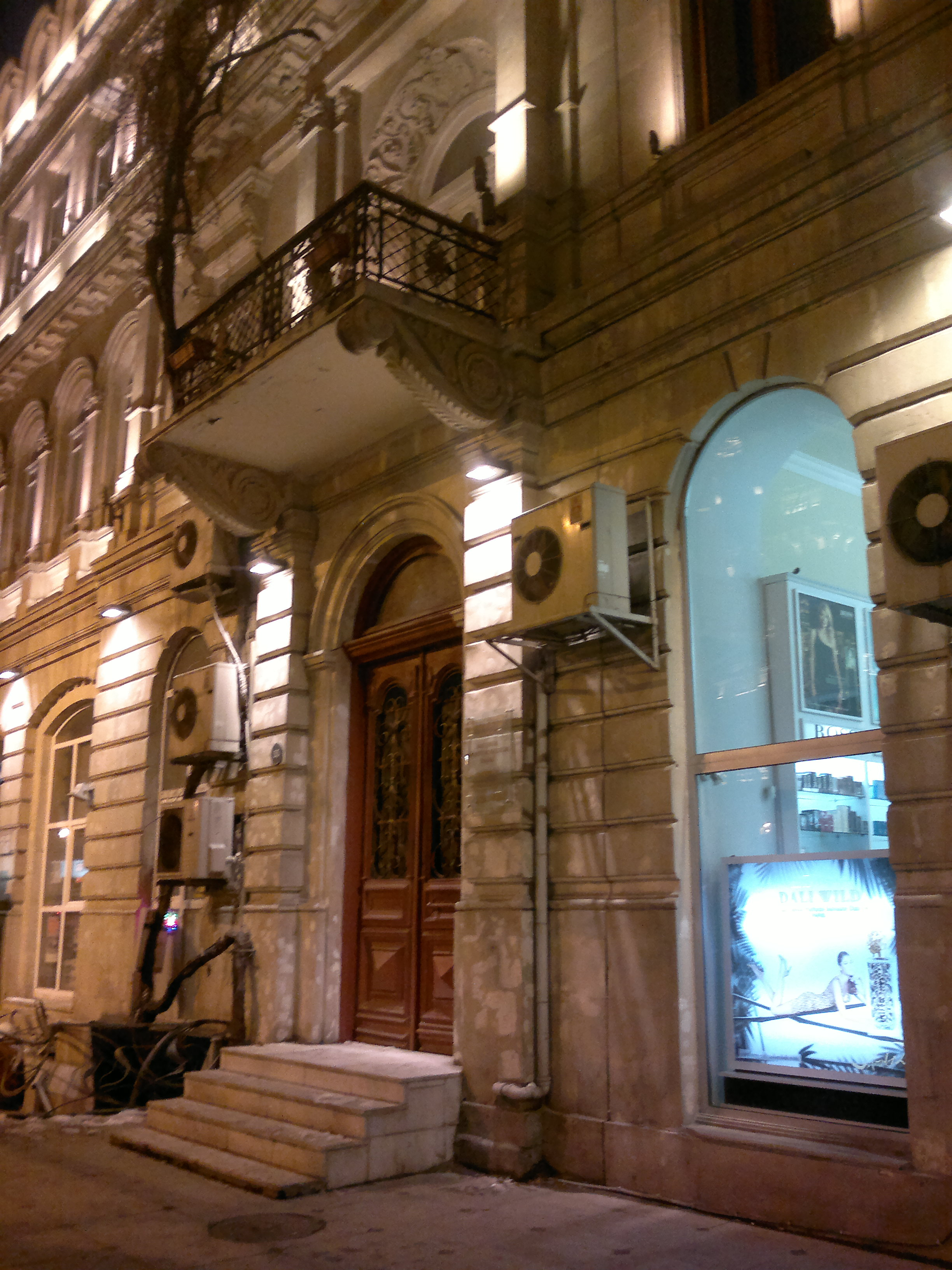

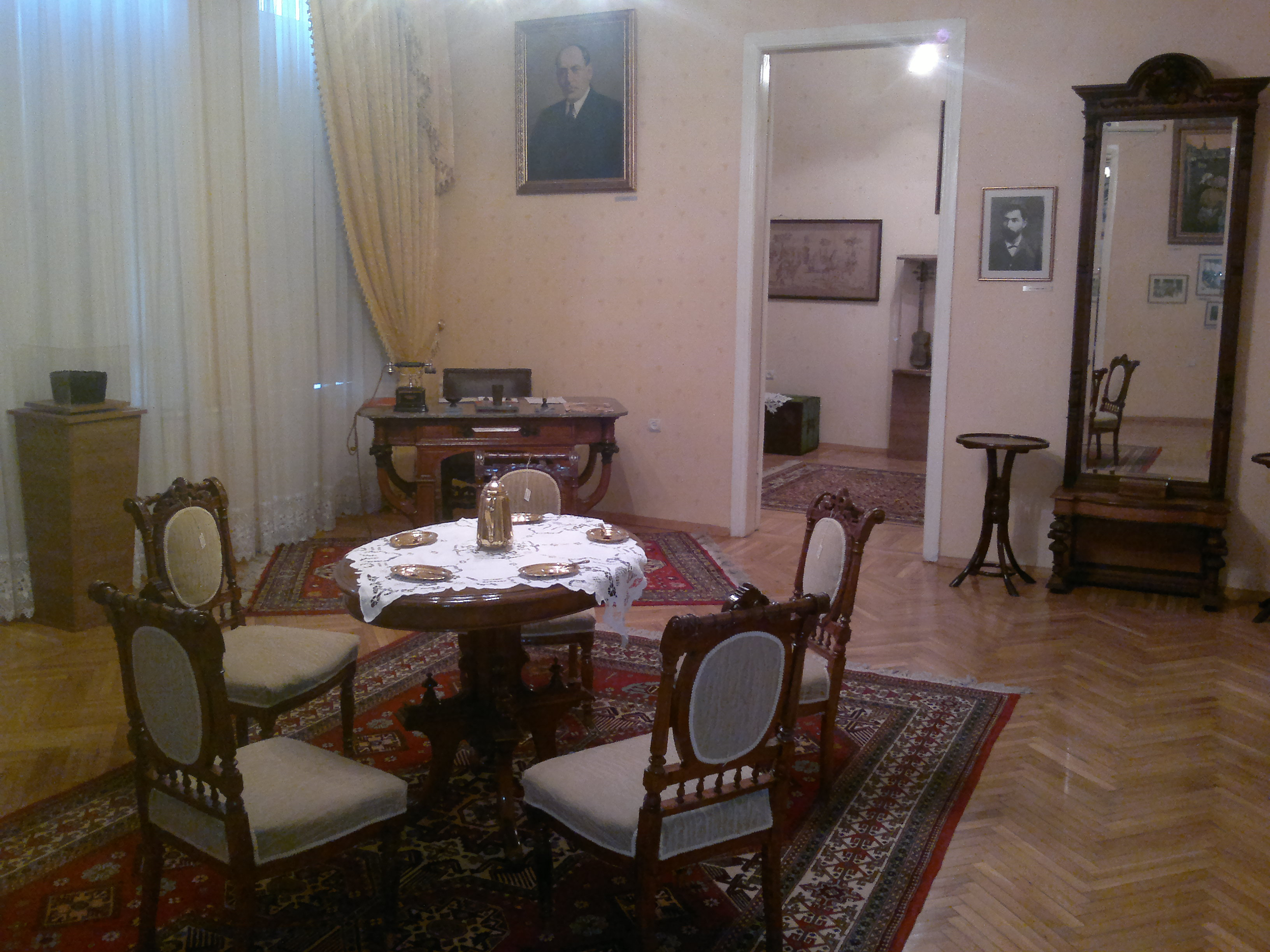

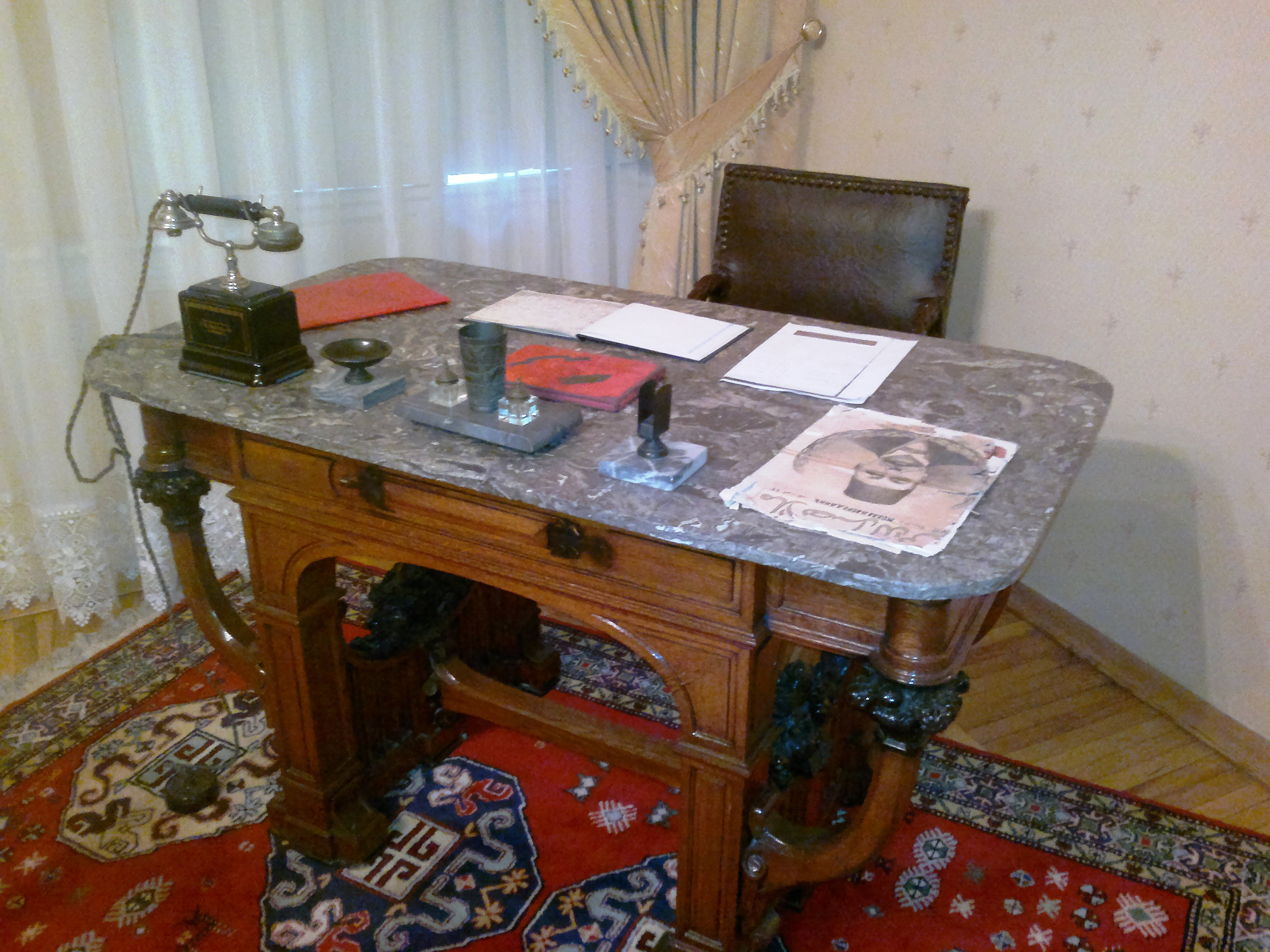
