= Rinay =

Natural history museum in Baku, Azerbaijan

Coordinates: 40.3328°N 49.8378°E

Rinay is a malacological museum of natural history in Baku, Azerbaijan. It is also the first private museum in the country.

== Structure ==
The museum exhibits approximately 5,000 clam shells (the shells of bivalve molluscs) from 86 genera worldwide. The museum also displays hundreds of fossil clamshells. Some of these were obtained by exchange from the Austrian, Canadian, Argentine, Spanish, German, Ukrainian, Russian, Turkish and Indonesian paleontological university museums.

The basis for the museum collection was laid down in the early 1930s by Sadykh Karayev, an Honored Engineer and Honored Inventor of the USSR. Karayev's clamshell collection was preserved by his wife Prof. Jeyran Ibadova, and was transferred from Rinay to the History Museum of Azerbaijan in June 2007. Sadykh Karayev's son Tofik Karayev continued the effort to improve his father's collection. T. Karayev previously worked at the Geological Institute of the Academy of Sciences of Azerbaijan SSR. He systematized the collection and conducted a taxonomic revision of modern molluscs. In 1989, the museum received official status.
