= Azerbaijan Carpet Museum =

Azerbaijan National Carpet Museum
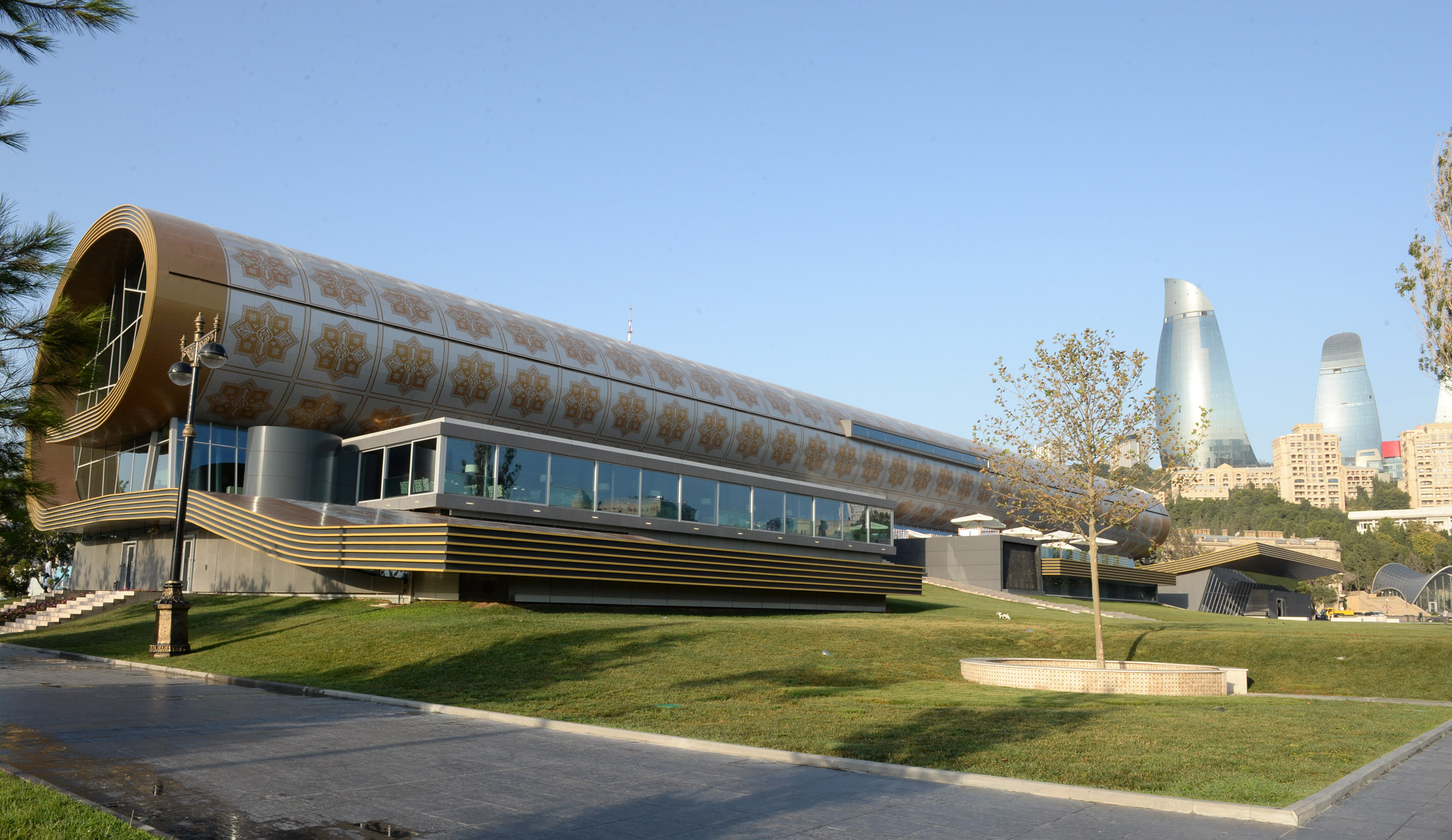
- Established: 1967
- Location: Mikayil Huseynov Street 28, Baku, Azerbaijan
- Coordinates: 40°21′35″N 49°50′08″E
- Type: Museum
- Director: Amina Malikova
- Public transit access: Icheri Sheher metro station, Baku Funicular.
- Website: www.azcarpetmuseum.az

Azerbaijan National Carpet Museum (Azerbaijani: Azərbaycan Milli Xalça Muzeyi, formerly called the Azerbaijan Carpet Museum) is a museum located in Baku that displays Azerbaijani carpets and rugs with historical and modern weaving techniques and materials. It has the largest collection of Azerbaijani carpets in the world. First opened on Neftchiler Avenue in 1967, it moved to a new building in the Baku seafront park in 2014.

== History ==
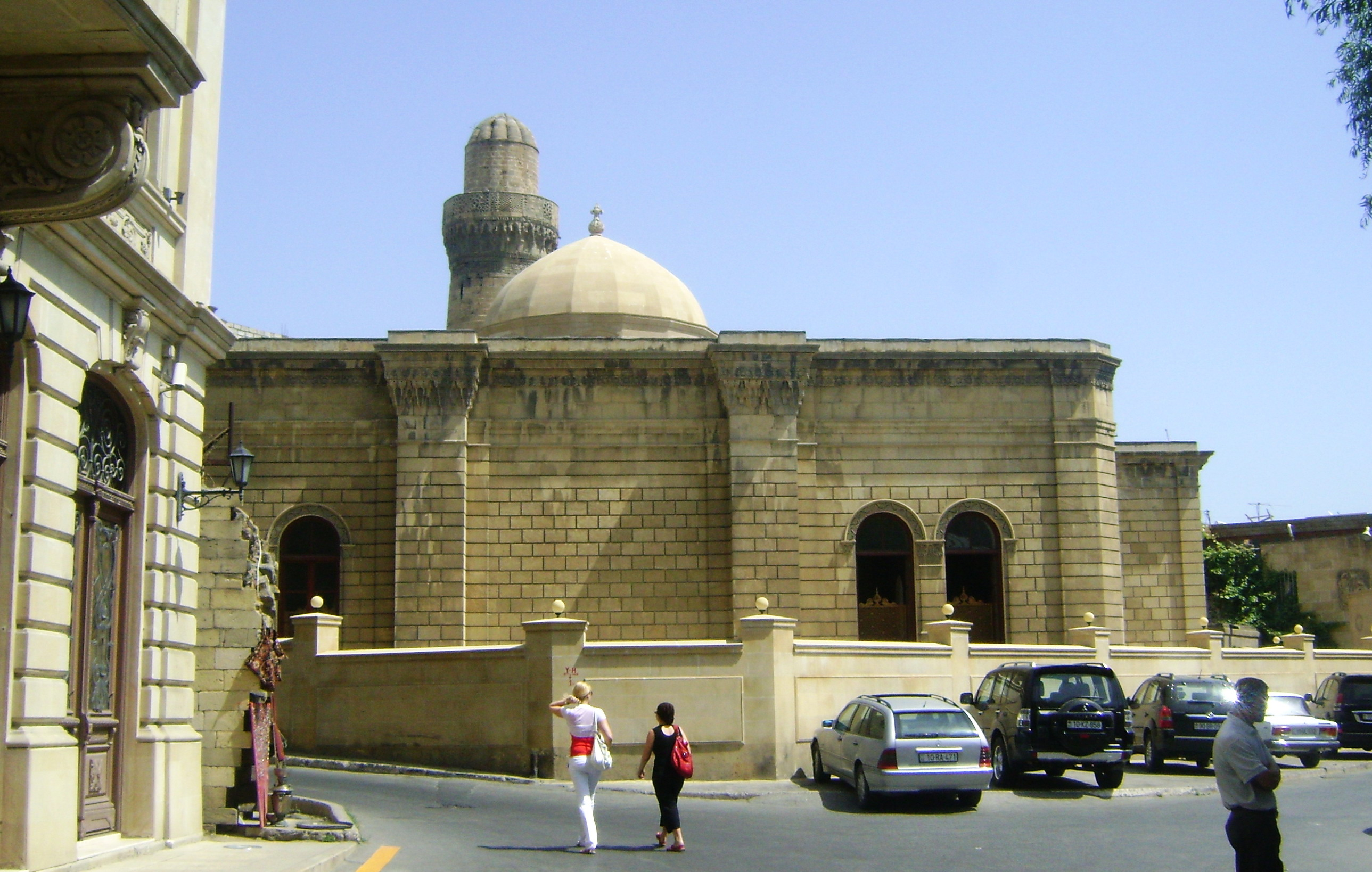
Former building of the museum, now the Juma Mosque

The museum was established in 1967 and was initially located in the Juma Mosque in Icheri Sheher. The mosque was built in the 15th century and renovated in the 19th century. Its first exhibition was held in 1972. In 1992, after the collapse of USSR, the museum was moved to the second floor of what is now the Baku Museum Center, a building that had originally been the Lenin museum. The collection was named in honour of the carpet designer Latif Karimov.

Plans to move the collection to a new purpose-built building began in 2010, and a new building was due to open in late 2012 with a visit being made by President Ilham Aliyev in September 2013. The museum opened on 26 August 2014, as the Azerbaijan Carpet Museum, dropping its much longer official title.

=== Museum concept ===
The main objectives of the Azerbaijan National Carpet Museum are to collect, preserve, research, demonstrate, and promote unique samples of carpet art, which is the national heritage of Azerbaijan.

=== Creation of the Collection ===
Since 1967, with the support of the country's leadership, the museum has regularly had the opportunity to expand its collection by purchasing handicraft samples from the population, folk industry, and the Azerkhalcha Scientific and Creative Production Association. It was during those years that some examples, considered masterpieces of Azerbaijani carpet art, were acquired for the museum. Thanks to the support of state officials and primarily National Leader Heydar Aliyev, a budget was allocated from the state treasury immediately after the establishment of the museum for the purchase of exhibits and the organization of expeditions to the regions. This work was led by Latif Karimov. Leading scholars of the country took part in the collection and further development of the Azerbaijan National Carpet Museum’s collections: Rasim Afandiyev, Honored Art Worker and the museum’s first director Aziz Aliyev, Doctor of Historical Sciences Hasan Guliyev, Candidate of Art History Najiba Abdullayeva, Doctors of Art History, professors Roya Taghiyeva and Kubra Aliyeva. On the instructions of the museum management, with the help of scholars, ancient carpets, carpet products, embroidery, samples of artistic metalwork, traditional costumes, etc., were acquired from the population. The Azerbaijan National Academy of Sciences regularly provided the museum with various finds made of ceramic, bronze, and bone, as well as jewelry from ancient times. Over time, the museum’s collections were also enriched with works by contemporary artists. These mainly include works by carpet artists and, later, by sculptors, ceramic artists, jewelers, and woodcarving masters.

Over the years of its activity, the museum has continuously developed and has become one of the most important fund-storages for the preservation of Azerbaijan’s national cultural heritage. As a result of numerous scientific-research expeditions carried out in various regions of Azerbaijan, the museum’s fund was enriched with the country’s tangible and intangible cultural assets. The museum vault houses more than 10,000 exhibits and includes seven collections: pile and flat-woven carpets, carpet products, artistic metalwork, textiles, costumes, embroidery, ceramics, glass, wood, paper, and jewelry. The museum stores rare items dating back to the Bronze Age, the Ancient Period, and the early Middle Ages, while the majority of the collection belongs to the 17th–20th centuries.

In the post-independence period, the museum’s funds were enriched with valuable items gifted by the Heydar Aliyev Foundation and the Ministry of Culture of the Republic of Azerbaijan. At the same time, carpets are donated to the museum by private collectors, philanthropists, and individuals from both local and international communities. In 2013, Beverly Schiltz, the widow of Grover Schiltz, who had been a member of the Chicago Oriental Rug and Textile Society, donated two valuable Azerbaijani carpets from the collection of the deceased to the museum. One of them is the Salyan Khilasi (Shirvan, 19th century), and the other is the Ajdahali (Dragon) carpet from Karabakh, dated to the late 17th century.

In 2017, on the occasion of the 50th anniversary of the Azerbaijan National Carpet Museum, a rare 18th-century embroidery piece was purchased from a foreign auction house by the Heydar Aliyev Foundation and donated to the museum. In the same year, Elshad Tahirov, a U.S. citizen of Azerbaijani origin, bought the Baghchada Gullar (Flowers in the Garden) carpet of the Karabakh group at an auction and donated it to the museum. Also in 2017, for the first time in its history, the Azerbaijan National Carpet Museum acquired a Shamakhi carpet dating from the late 17th to early 18th century from the Austria Auction Company.

In 2018, the Heydar Aliyev Foundation donated the Khatai and Nakhchivan carpets, dating back to the 17th century and considered among the most valuable items in the collection, to the museum. In the same year, Italian collector Mirco Cattai donated the 19th-century Hajigayib carpet from Guba to the museum. In addition, the museum's collection was enriched with two more exhibits—the Sirt Chichi carpet from Guba and the Khila Buta carpet from Baku.

In 2019, for the first time in the museum's history, two Qajar period women's jewelry pieces were purchased from the Sotheby’s Auction House. The 19th-century Gonagkend carpet was donated to the museum by U.S. citizens Hillary-Dumas Jones and Jay Jones.

In 2020, Italian collector Erminio Bottini donated the Sor-sor carpet, woven in 1811 and belonging to the Shirvan group, to the Azerbaijan National Carpet Museum.

In 2024, unique examples of decorative applied art were returned to the homeland and donated to the museum. Thus, Metin and Huseyn Konukchu (Turkey), Mirco Cattai (Italy), and Hojat Abasi (Germany) donated the late 19th – early 20th century Pashali kilim (Shirvan), Shikhli (Gazakh), Achma-Yumma, and Bahmanli (Karabakh) carpets from their collections to the museum.

=== Visitors ===
Today, the Azerbaijan National Carpet Museum is one of the most visited cultural institutions of Azerbaijan. During 2016, Azerbaijan National Carpet Museum had approximately 60.000 visitors; in 2017, the number of visitors exceeded 85.000. In 2018, the number of visitors reached 110.000. The year of 2019 marked many significant events for Azerbaijan National Carpet Museum. Firstly, Azerbaijan National Carpet Museum had 122.143 visitors, thus breaking its own record and becoming the country’s most visited museum. One of the major milestones of 2019 was the launch of inclusive initiatives at Azerbaijan National Carpet Museum. This means that the persons with disabilities can also visit the museum and explore its exposition. Information on the inclusive programs of ANCM has been presented to international museum organizations such as ICOM and NEMO. From the beginning of 2019, the employees of the Traditional Technologies Department and the Children’s Museum Department of Azerbaijan National Carpet Museum regularly conduct master-classes for the persons with disabilities. All descriptive texts in the exposition are also provided in Braille for visually impaired persons. Moreover, the employees of the Traditional Technologies Department of the museum made the carpet samples, which combine the pile and flat weaving techniques. These samples allow the visually impaired persons to tactilely feel shapes of traditional carpet ornaments.

In 2020, the museum presented the virtual exposition provided with the sign language interpretation for the persons with hearing impairments. Also, the visitors can have a tour guided by sign language interpreter. The museum also ensures accessibility for wheelchair users. Descriptive texts and exhibit labels are positioned for comfortable reading from a seated position. It is also easy to reach touchscreens.

In 2022, museums, galleries, and other cultural institutions continued their activity after restrictions related to the COVID19 pandemic. In 2022 museums had more visitors compared to 2021. In 2021, 14.398 men visited ANCM, in 2022, the number of visitors has reached 70.608.

=== Events ===
On 16 November 2017, in celebration of the 50th anniversary of the Azerbaijan Carpet Museum and the anniversary of Latif Karimov’s birth, the exhibition New Pearls of the Collection was opened at the museum. On this occasion, a round table entitled "Textile Collections in Museums" was also held, with the participation of staff members from more than twenty regional history and local lore museums, as well as museums of the capital. In addition, a tour entitled "Introducing the Collections and the Conservation and Restoration Department of the Azerbaijan Carpet Museum" was organized for representatives of museums and public associations from Kazakhstan, Kyrgyzstan, and Russia.

By the decision of the Cabinet of Ministers of the Republic of Azerbaijan dated July 15, 2019, the Azerbaijan Carpet Museum was granted the status of National for its exceptional services in the field of protection and promotion of the carpet art of our country.

In November 2022, an event was held dedicated to the 55th anniversary of the establishment of the Azerbaijan National Carpet Museum, the first carpet museum in the world. An artistic embroidery dating back to the early 18th century and two pairs of earrings dating to the second half of the 20th century were presented.

In August 2024, the event Contemporary Space for an Ancient Art was held to commemorate the 10th anniversary of the museum’s new building. The event was held with the joint organization of the Ministry of Culture of the Republic of Azerbaijan and the Azerbaijan National Carpet Museum. A video project, Carpet for Me is..., created with the participation of figures of art and culture, was presented to the guests. At the event, for the first time, carpets donated by collectors from various countries were showcased—these included the Pashali kilim (Shirvan), Shikhli (Gazakh), Achma-yumma and Bahmanli (Karabakh), dating from the 19th to the early 20th century.

On 29–30 April 2025, a tournament titled Battle of Champions was held at the Azerbaijan National Carpet Museum, jointly organized by the Azerbaijan Chess Federation, the Ministry of Youth and Sports of the Republic of Azerbaijan, and the Azerbaijan National Carpet Museum.

=== Awards ===
From 2017–2022 and 2022–2023, the Azerbaijan National Carpet Museum was recognized as the Best Museum of the Year and received a Certificate of Excellence from TripAdvisor, the most famous online travel platform. In 2018, the ANCM was awarded for Best Experience in the field of intangible cultural heritage databases by the International Council of Museums’ (ICOM) International Committee for Documentation (CIDOC). The Azerbaijan National Carpet Museum was also nominated for the European Museum of the Year Award (EMYA) in 2018 and received a certificate for innovation in public engagement within the museum sector.

In 2022, the Azerbaijan National Carpet Museum won the Umay National Prize. Moreover, a group of museum employees received Honorary Diplomas from the Ministry of Culture of the Republic of Azerbaijan for their contributions.

On August 26, 2024, the Azerbaijan National Carpet Museum held the Contemporary Space for an Ancient Art event, dedicated to the 10th anniversary of the museum’s new building. The event was organized by the Ministry of Culture of the Republic of Azerbaijan and the Azerbaijan National Carpet Museum. During the event, the museum received a Certificate of Appreciation from the Ministry of Culture of the Republic of Azerbaijan for its contribution to the preservation and promotion of carpet and folk and decorative art.

== Building ==
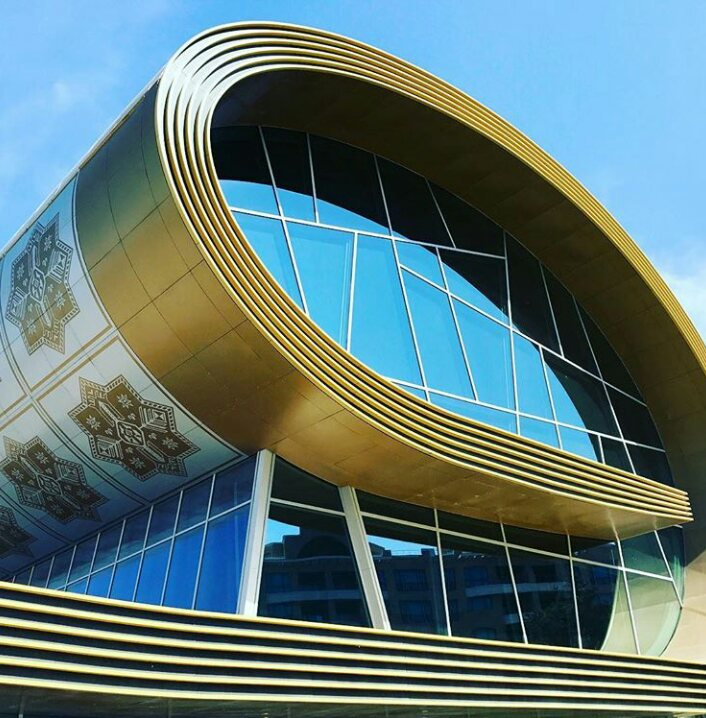
Side of the building

The structure of the building is intended to look like a rolled carpet. Designed by Austrian architect Franz Janz, the building took over six years to construct. The previous structure, a building of historical significance, was destroyed to make way for the new building.

== Collection ==
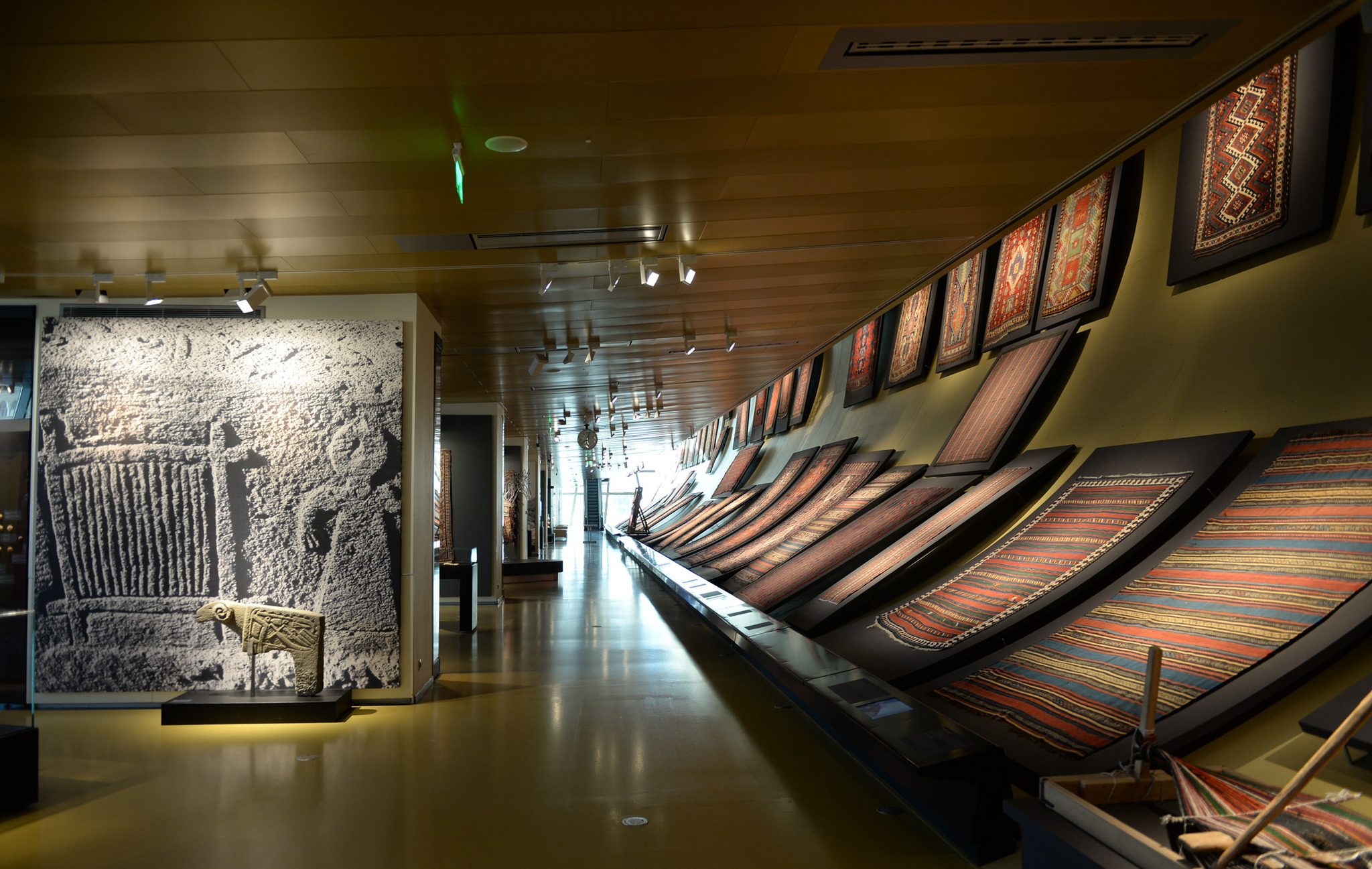
Items in the collection

The collection of the museum includes over 10,000 items of ceramics, metal works of the 14th century, jewellery from the Bronze Age, carpets and carpet items from the 17th-20th centuries, national garments and embroidery, and applied art works of the Modern Age. The museum organizes public lectures and study courses on carpets and applied arts. It has a bookstore selling books on Azerbaijani crafts and carpet art. The museum also holds a permanent collection from the Shusha Museum of History, from the city of Shusha. Some of the exhibited items from the Shusha museum were part of 600 carpets moved out of the museum before Shusha was captured by Armenian troops in 1992. They are now displayed at the museum in an exhibition titled "Burned Culture". In 2020, the Garagoyunlu carpet was included in the collection. In July 2022, the museum presented its newest exhibit, the Lampa carpet, originally woven in Shusha during the 1930s.

== International exhibitions ==
The museum does research and public service work. Every year, state and international exhibitions are organized, and catalogues on carpets are printed by the museum. The museum has also held exhibitions in more than 30 countries, including France, Germany, England, Japan, the Netherlands. In 1998, the museum participated in a UNESCO-organized exhibition in Paris dedicated to Fuzûlî and in 1999, dedicated to the 1,300th anniversary of the Book of Dede Korkut and displayed carpets, folk applied art items, including copper jugs, mugs, buckets, and saddlebags.

== Ideological background ==
According to the peer-reviewed International Journal of Heritage Studies, the basis of classification and exhibition in the carpet museum of Baku is rooted in several factors, such as the geographical indicators associated with regional carpets, which reflect the development of a new type of state-sponsored national consciousness in the 1950s during the existence of the Azerbaijan SSR of the Soviet Union. During de-Stalinization, the Central Committee of the Azerbaijan Communist Party approved reforms aimed at defining and encouraging Azerbaijani history and culture, as well as replacing Russian with Azerbaijani as the constituent state language of the Azerbaijan SSR. Much of the contemporaneous Baku Central Committee had been active in Iran in the 1940s as part of the Soviet occupation, and its members firmly believed that Iran's Azerbaijan region historically belonged to their nation. The controversial decision to replace Russian with Azerbaijani as the official state language of the Azerbaijan SSR was also implemented partly in response to its Transcaucasian rivals, the Armenian and Georgian SSRs, who had already made their own native languages official in their respective republics in 1936 after the dissolution of the Transcaucasian SFSR. This period was also when the designation Azerbaijani replaced Turk in official usage. The issue of Karabakh was brought up again during de-Stalinization, with the Armenians of the predominantly Armenian-populated Nagorno-Karabakh Autonomous Oblast requesting unification with the Armenian SSR. All such cultural initiatives from the Azerbaijan SSR emerged in an environment of relative freedom of expression; a rise of nationalism in the Caucasus region; a fixation on Iran's Azerbaijan region; as well as a surge in rivalry with its Transcaucasian Soviet neighbors, especially Armenia, over "national rights and territory". The International Journal of Heritage Studies notes:

The above issues are the basis of classification and exhibition in the Carpet Museum in Baku. The implied territorial claims within the classification are put to contentious political use within the museum. These include claims over Iranian Azerbaijan, which the Azerbaijani government refers to as 'Southern Azerbaijan', and exclusive claims leaving out Armenia over territories in Karabakh. The current museum reflects Karimov's taxonomy (which, as noted, was a nationalist project) as well as his detailed classification of the historical periods of carpet production.

and:

Throughout the other two levels, exhibits are clustered in groups along the linear space of the exhibition. While the act of weaving is on display (using not only electronic footage and imagery, but also live demonstrations by weavers), the exhibits illustrate various applications of carpets, including in domestic life but also their utility in reflecting some historical events. Of note is a carpet depicting heroes of the Iranian Constitutional Revolution, many of whom were from Iranian Azerbaijan. Although naming them, the museum (following the official line in the Republic of Azerbaijan) remains silent on the national origin of the depicted heroes. In instances such as this, the visitor is left to the interpretation provided by official guides to understand the characters and their historical roles. The result is more often than not, affirming a nationalist Azerbaijani narrative, that makes implicit claims on territory outside of the Republic of Azerbaijan.

The third level of the museum, which is devoted to Latif Karimov, presents and acknowledges Karimov as the "undisputed authority in the science and art of carpet weaving, thereby establishing the accuracy of the exhibitions thorough the scientific standing of Karimov". On the museum's second level there is a specific woven piece meant to reflect Karimov's classification and groupings of carpets, which the International Journal of Heritage Studies describes as "perhaps the most striking exhibit, in so far as territorial claims are concerned". On the piece, "under the banner of Azerbaijani carpet, various forms, motifs and artistic commonalities between Azerbaijan and other nations and ethnicities, including Iranians and Armenians are claimed and appropriated."

== See also ==
- Azerbaijan State Museum of Art
- Azerbaijan State Museum of History
