= Chul (carpet) =

Traditional horse-cover from Azerbaijan

A chul is a traditional horse-cover made from thick wool material, used to protect the animal from cold weather. The covers are mostly woven using pile or non-woven techniques, with intricate designs and rich color harmony. Chul is an important element of Azerbaijani cultural heritage and has a long history dating back to ancient times.

== Design and ornamentation ==
Chuls are mostly rectangular in shape, with fringed edges, and are decorated with various ornaments. The design and ornamentation of chuls vary depending on the region and the social status of the owner. For example, rulers and officials used precious stones in the artistic design of their chuls.

One example of a chul is the Chulaian from the Shirvan group, which is preserved in the Azerbaijan Carpet Museum and dates back to the late 19th century. It is unique with its rich ornament and color harmony. The composition consists of intermediate and three edges, and it is decorated with a geometric element, stylized butterfly and bird drawings. On the border, there is the sign "flow water" representing infinity and protection of the S-shaped hinge motifs. In the center section, the "combs" element, which means being protected from scams, is decorated in consistency. The element "Pıtraq," which means abundance and blessing, is also considered one of the main ornaments hanging on the chul. Flower elements decorating borders symbolize divine love and longing.

== Usage and production ==
Chuls were widely used in special gatherings and banquets to protect the animal (horses, camels, oxen) in cold weather. The weaving of chuls was done using wool, cotton, and sometimes silk threads, and the weaving knives decorated them with various ornaments. The rectangular shape of the wick rope was wounded with fringed skulls.

The use of pile carpet technology in Azerbaijan dates back to ancient times and has a rich history in the development of home appliances. Archaeological materials and written sources indicate that carpet-making in Azerbaijan dates back to the Bronze Age (the end of the 2nd millennium BC – early in the 1st millennium). For instance, a clay decorated with flower patterns on a horseshoe hinge found in Maku, South Azerbaijan (2nd millennium BC) and the surface of the golden glass discovered on Hasanli Hill near Lake Urmia, along with other findings, demonstrate the ancient history of carpet art in Azerbaijan.

Chuls were woven in Garabagh, Mugan, Shirvan, Baku, as well as in South Azerbaijan, and were selected for both texture, material, and artistic design. Written sources provide detailed information on many Azerbaijani carpet products, including chuls. In the 10th century work Hudud al-'Alam, an unknown author informs about the chules woven in Muğan.
