= Zakir Baghirov =

Zakir Baghirov may refer to:

- Zakir Baghirov (composer) (1916–1996), Azerbaijani composer
- Zakir Baghirov (minister) (1929–1989), Azerbaijani statesman
