= Statue of a Liberated Woman =

Sculpture in Baku, Azerbaijan

- Azad qadın heykəli (Azerbaijani)
- Interactive map of Statue of a Liberated Woman
- 40.378879°N 49.831233°E
- Location: Public Square, Baku

History
- Built: 30 April 1960

Site notes
- Architect: Mikhail Huseynov
- Sculptor: Fuad Abdurahmanov

Statue of a Liberated Woman is a statue by Fuad Abdurahmanov in Baku, Azerbaijan. It was built in 1960 at the Public Square at the intersection of Gurbanov and Jafar Jabbarly streets in Yasamal raion, and was inspired by the character of Sevil from Jafar Jabbarly's play Sevil. The act of publicly removing the veil symbolizes the transition of Azerbaijani women from seclusion to participation in Soviet society.

== Background ==
Fuad Aburahmanov, the designer of the statue, stated:

"The topic of emancipation of Azerbaijani women has attracted me for a long time. When I started work on the sculpture, for some reason, I imagined an eagle that had become entangled in the net. She tears her bonds, finally, frees from them. One more moment, and it will soar into the sunny sky."

Veil as a part of woman’s wardrobe was the trait of all cities where trade was developing. The anti-veil movement was initially started in 1908 in Baku by the liberal bourgeoisie, well before the Soviet Hujum in 1927. However, the anti-veil protests were suppressed by Islamic clergy, causing a major setback. While some women stopped wearing the veil then, many still wore the veil out of social pressure.

A prominent Azeri women's organization based in Baku, the Ali Bayramov Club, actively participated in the campaign to encourage women to take off the veil.

After Azerbaijan became part of Soviet Union, the social status of women changed. As more women became employed, they dressed more often in work clothes instead of the veil. Public displays of anti-veil sentiments, which continued to face opposition from the clergy, regained momentum in the 1920's with the implementation of the Hujum. It was not unusual for girls who stopped wearing the veil to be rejected by their family. Komsomol member Sariyya Khalilova was killed by her father for taking off the veil. The prominence of the statue reflects and honors the bravery and willpower of women who abandoned the veil.

== Construction ==
Fuad Abdurahmanov created the original statue from gypsum in 1951. The monument was restored in 1957 and recreated using bronze. The bronze statue was named "Liberty" and was displayed at the exposition of the Museum of Arts. Several officials who saw the monument decided it would be moved to central Baku in honour of the 40th anniversary of the Soviet government. Abdurahmanov then began work on a larger version of the monument, which was completed in 1959 in the city of Leningrad where the bronze was cast; the finished statue was then transported back to Azerbaijan and placed on a tall pedestal.

== See also ==
- Religion in Azerbaijan
- Hujum
- Sevil
