= Jafar Jabbarly =

Azerbaijani poet and screenwriter (1899–1934)

- Azerbaijani: Cəfər Cabbarlı
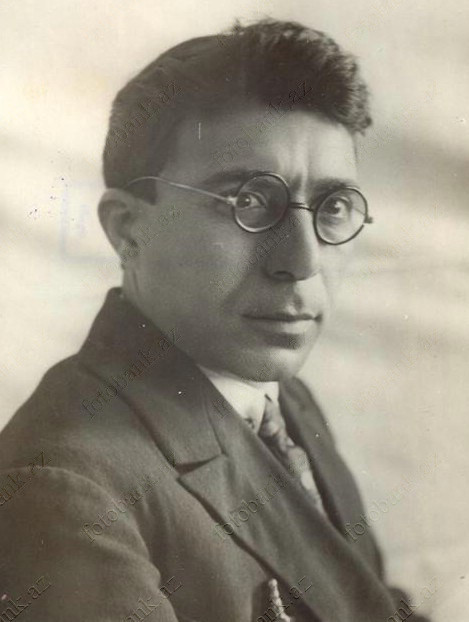
- Born: 20 March 1899; Khizi, Baku Governorate, Russian Empire (present day Azerbaijan)
- Died: 31 December 1934 (aged 35); Baku, Azerbaijan SSR, Soviet Union
- Occupations: Dramaturge, Poet, Screenwriter

Jafar Gafar oghlu Jabbarly (Azerbaijani: Cəfər Qafar oğlu Cabbarlı, 20 March 1899, Khizi – 31 December 1934, Baku) was an eminent Azerbaijani and Soviet writer, the founder of the Azerbaijan Soviet dramaturgy. He was a director, playwright and screenwriter.

== Early life ==
After his father's death in 1902, Jabbarly's mother moved to Baku with her four children. Jabbarli began his education in 1905 at the 7th Muslim–Russian School in Baku. He studied under prominent intellectuals of the time, including Suleyman Sani Akhundov, Abdulla Shaig, and Rahim bey Shikhlinski. Coming from a poor family, he faced financial difficulties in covering his educational expenses. On the initiative of the school administration, he was exempted from tuition fee and received support from philanthropists. He graduated from the school in 1908 with first place.

In 1909, he was admitted to the 3rd Alekseyev High School. In 1915, Jabbarly graduated from high school and studied electromechanics at Baku Polytechnicum for the next 5 years. During this period, his educational expenses were covered by the philanthropist Isa bey Ashurbeyov.

In 1920 he was admitted to Azerbaijan State University to study applied medicine but due to his lack of interest soon switched to Oriental studies. In 1923, he started attending lectures at a local theatre to fulfill his interest in drama.

== Political activities ==
During the period of the Azerbaijan Democratic Republic (1918–1920), Jabbarlı was actively involved in political and cultural life. In October 1918, he began working as a translator for the newspaper Azerbaijan. In December 1918, he was appointed as a stenographer in the Azerbaijan Parliament. On 10 November 1918, he attended a banquet held in honor of Nuru Pasha, who played a key role in the liberation of Baku. Jabbarlı met Nuru Pasha at this event. Later, Nuru Pasha visited Jabbarlı’s home and presented gifts to his family.

After the fall of the Azerbaijan Democratic Republic, Jabbarlı became the chief secretary of the Central Committee of the Musavat Party, which continued its activities underground. Because of his political involvement, he was monitored by the Soviet secret police, the Cheka. In 1923, Jabbarlı was arrested twice due to his political activities. During his first arrest on 15 June 1923, his manuscripts were confiscated, and he was released shortly afterward. He was arrested again on 5 October 1923. While in prison, he continued working on his poem Qız qalası, using a pencil in his prison cell. Due to public pressure and his reputation as a writer, he was released on 30 October 1923.

== Literature, theatre and film ==
Jafar Jabbarly started writing poems in his early teenage years and was reported to have had his first poems published in the Azerbaijani newspaper Hagigat-i Afkar in 1911. At the age of 13, in 1912, he wrote his first dramatic work, Vəfalı Səriyyə (Faithful Sariyya). In the same year, he also authored the novel Kazım bəy (Mr. Kazim), which focuses on themes of adventure and romance. In the following years, he wrote more than 20 plays, as well as poems, essays, short stories, and articles. In 1916, his melodrama Solğun çiçəklər (Pale Flowers) was staged and received significant public attention. In 1917, he wrote the historical plays Ədirnə fəthi (The Conquest of Edirne) and Ulduz, which reflect his interest in Ottoman history and the wider Turkic world. His work Bakı müharibəsi (The Battle of Baku), written in 1918, focused on the March Days and the liberation of Baku.

His works were very much influenced by the 1920s propaganda of Communist glory and celebrated appropriate themes such as equality, labour, education, cosmopolitanism, emancipation of women, cultural shifts, etc. His plays Sevil, Almaz, Od gəlini (The Bride of Fire), and 1905-ci ildə (In 1905) are particularly noted for their focus on themes of women’s emancipation and social transformation. The play 1905-ci ildə is especially significant for its historical treatment of Armenian–Muslim conflicts.

Jabbarly's major accomplishment in introducing European plays to average Azerbaijanis was translating William Shakespeare's Hamlet into Azerbaijani in 1925 and directing it at the Azerbaijan Drama Theatre a year later. He also translated William Shakespeare’s Othello, Friedrich Schiller’s The Robbers, Leo Tolstoy’s Hadji Murat, and Pierre-Augustin Caron de Beaumarchais’ The Marriage of Figaro into Azerbaijani Turkish.

Jafar Jabbarly is considered the founder of screenwriting in Azerbaijan. Two of his plays, Sevil and Almaz, both written in 1928, were made into films in 1929 and 1936 respectively. Both focused on the theme of the role of women, their oppression, struggle, and ultimately, victory over dated patriarchal traditions.

== Death and legacy ==
Jafar Jabbarly died at the age of 35 of heart failure and was buried at the Alley of Honor. The national film studio, Azerbaijanfilm, a street, a square and a metro station in Baku are named after him.

On 22 May 1985 the House-Museum of Jafar Jabbarly was opened. It is located in the house on I. Gutgashinli street 44 (former G. Sultanov street), Baku, where Jafar Jabbarly used to live.

== See also ==
- House-Museum of Jafar Jabbarly
- Statue of a Liberated Woman
