= Sevil (1928 play) =

1928 play by Jafar Jabbarly

External videos
- Screen version of the opera from 1970

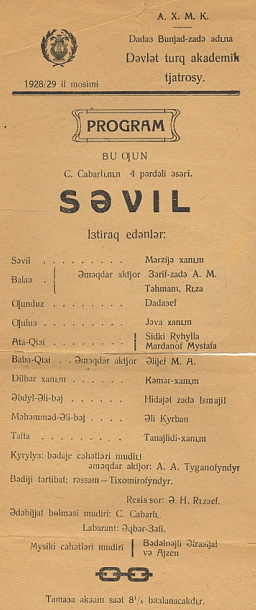
Program of the play Sevil, 1928-1929

Sevil is a play by Azerbaijani playwright Jafar Jabbarly written in 1928. It focused on the theme of the role of women, their oppression, struggle, and ultimately, victory over dated patriarchal traditions. Many women discarded their veils in the city theater after seeing the play.

Later adaptations of the play were less extreme compared to the original. It was made into a film with the same title in 1929, which was shown throughout Central Asia and the Caucasus.

== Plot ==
The action takes place in Baku in 1918-1919. Sevil and Balash are an Azerbaijani couple of peasant origin. While Sevil dedicates herself to home and family, Balash achieves some position in society and despises his wife for her simple manners. When she gives birth to a daughter instead of a son, he leaves her with the newborn baby. After some time, Balash has become a major exchange trader, living in Baku with a beautiful young singer named Dilber. He becomes involved in Baku's aristocratic high society associated with Musavat government and White army officers. Sevil still lives in the village and dreams of being reunited with her husband. Balash's sister and father sympathise with Sevil and convince her to go to Baku to persuade Balash to return to the family.

They arrive at Balash's mansion and find out that a large feast is being held there. Balash is outraged that they dared to spoil his party with their peasant looks. He orders to take away Sevil's daughter and throw her out of his house with his own father and sister. Sevil finds herself on the street and observes the life of ordinary citizens and workers. She begins to be involved in the revolutionary movement. At the same time, Dilber robs Balash by stealing his securities and money and leaves him. She flees from Baku ahead of the advancing Red Army, while Sevil is tearing off her veil and walks in the columns of the revolutionary crowd. In desperation, Balash tries to shoot Sevil.

Ten years have passed. Sevil returns to Baku after several years of study in Moscow. She is reunited with her daughter and they happily drive through a new, modern Baku, while squalid and miserable Balash silently stands in the crowd - he has no place in Soviet society.

== See also ==
- Statue of a Liberated Woman
- Theatre in Azerbaijan
- Women in Azerbaijan
