= Shusha Museum of History =

Museum in Shusha, Azerbaijan

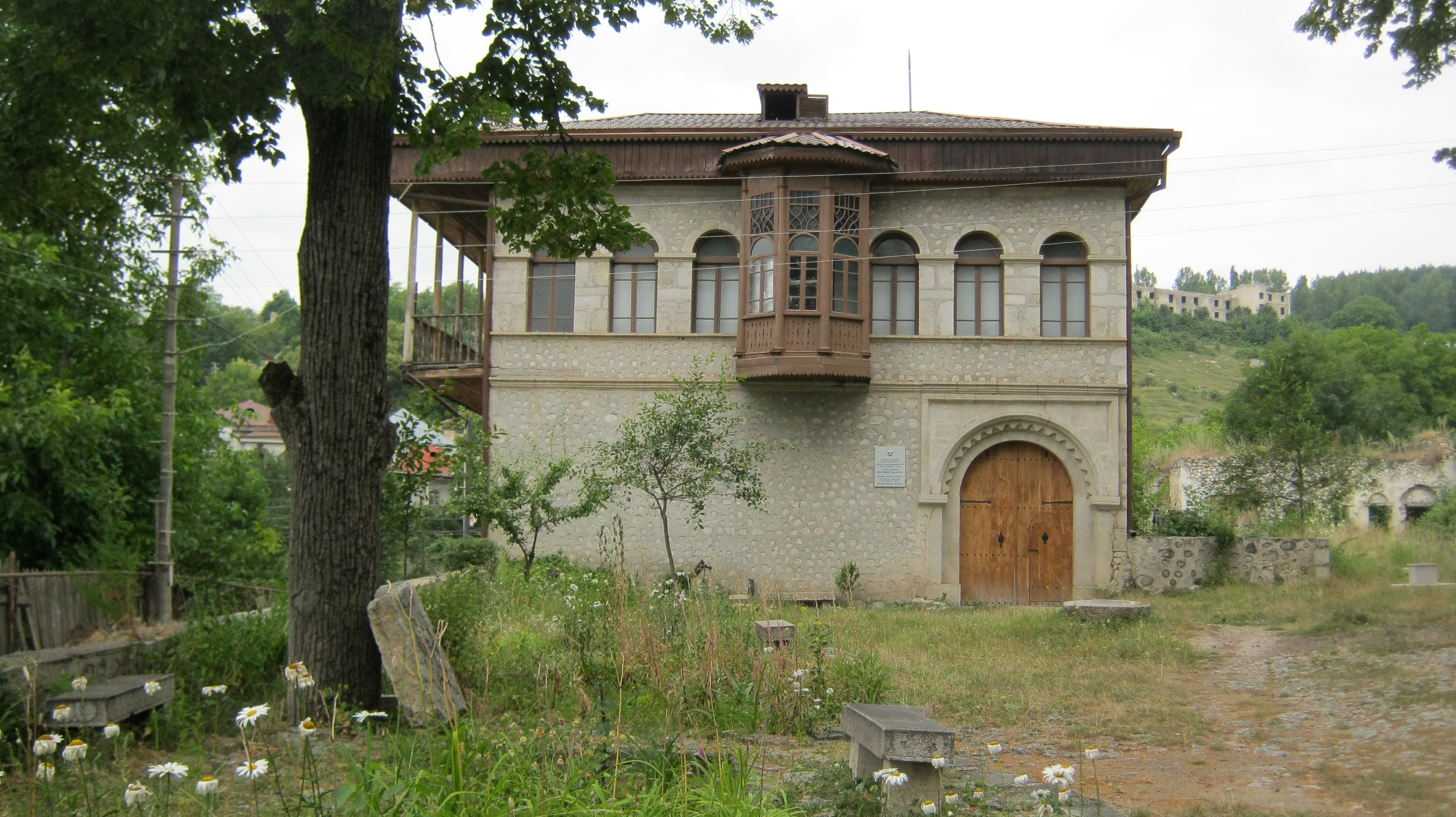
- Established: 1969
- Location: Shusha, Azerbaijan

Shusha Museum of History (Azerbaijani: Şuşa tarix muzeyi) was one of 8 museums located in Shusha, Azerbaijan. It was built in 1969 and contained up to 5,000 exhibits. The museum was closed after the capture of Shusha on May 8, 1992.

== History ==
The idea of establishing Shusha Museum of History dates back to 1967. At that time, Arif Agakishiyev, who worked as the first secretary of Shusha District Party Committee, raised the idea of creating such a museum before the Ministry of Culture and the idea was positively received.

== Collecting of exhibits ==
After the decision to establish a museum, in parallel, an announcement is made among the population and antiquities are collected voluntarily from the residents. After studying the exhibits discovered by archaeologists in the "Aghziyastı kaha" cave near Shusha and belonging to the 2nd millennium BC, some of them were handed over to the newly created museum, and others were handed transferred to the National Museum of History of Azerbaijan.

== Opening ceremony ==
In parallel with the collection of exhibits, restoration works were carried out in the Yukhari Govhar Agha Mosque, and the opening of the museum is being carried out within the framework of the events planned to be held in Shusha in connection with the jubilee of Molla Panah Vagif in June 1968. The former Minister of Culture, Zakir Bagirov, well-known cultural and artistic figures of Azerbaijan and the district administration took part in the opening. In 1981, after a long break, Shusha began to receive its visitors as Shusha Museum of History.

== Departments ==
Reconstruction works in the center of culture were carried out by the employees of the art-production workshop that organizes museums and exhibitions of the Ministry of Culture. Three departments related to the 18th, 19th and 20th centuries are created in the museum.

== Exhibits ==
In the museum, rare photos reflecting the history of Shusha city, documents from the 19th and early 20th centuries, schemes, models and photographs of historical houses built in Shusha in the 18th and 19th centuries were exhibited. Here there were interesting stands and exhibits about well-known Azerbaijani intellectuals, educators, singers, musicologists and writers who were born and lived in the city of Shusha. In the department of decorative and applied art, valuable art objects, buckets, pot sets, pottery products, carpets, rugs, and artistic textile samples woven in Shusha and surrounding villages were stored. Materials collected in connection with M.P.Vagif's jubilee were also exhibited in the museum.

In the museum, priority is given to moments related to the creation of the Karabakh Khanate. In 1981, 2792 exhibits were stored in the museum's exhibit fund. In 1980, 500 more exhibits were added to the museum serving 53,000 people. Later, the funds allocated by the Ministry of Culture, as well as the number of exhibits voluntarily presented to the museum by the population increased to 5,500. Of these, 3,500 were valuable exhibits belonging to the main fund, and 2,000 to the auxiliary fund. The museum exhibited the paintings of the Russian artist Vasily Vereshchagin while he was in Shusha in 1864, and an unexploded 43-kilogram shell during the attack of Agha Muhammad Shah Qajar.
