= Sariyya Khalilova =

Azerbaijani activist

- Səriyyə Xəlilova
- Born: 1897
- Died: 1933 (aged 35–36); Baku
- Cause of death: murder
- Monuments: Baku, Free woman.

Sariyya Khalilova was an employee of the Ali Bayramov Women's Club's sewing factory, an activist in the movement for women's liberation from the veil in Azerbaijan, and one of the first women to throw off the veil.

== Murder ==
Sariyya Khalilova was brutally murdered in Baku in January 1933 by her father and brother. Khalilova was an activist in the movement for women's liberation from the veil in Azerbaijan and one of the first women to throw off the veil.

The funeral of Khalilova turned into a protest against the traditional patriarchal way of life for women, and thousands of women attended. Workers and peasant women in factories, plants, collective farms and state farms expressed their deep anger at the murder of Khalilova and vowed to fight even more stubbornly for their rights.

Sariyya was stabbed to death by her brother at the age of 36. According to some sources, her father was also involved and took responsibility for the murder in order to protect his son. Her father was then imprisoned.

In response to Khalilova's murder, women working in the main industrial enterprises of Baku wrote appeals to the leading bodies of the republic, as well as to Moscow (Azerbaijan was then part of the USSR), demanding that the murderer be sentenced to death. Thus, a short trial was organized. Khalilova's father was sentenced to death and shot in the courtyard of the Bayil prison.

It was widely known among the city and state structures that Khalilova was murdered by her own brother, Alakbar, and he was sentenced to 10 years in prison.

== Legacy ==
The memory of Khalilova was immortalized 1 year later with the feature film "Ismet" (also known as "The Destruction of Custom"). This film was dedicated not only to the memory of Sariyya, but also to the first female pilot of Azerbaijan, Leyla Mammadbeyova. Thus, the director intended for the film to reflect the fate of Azerbaijani women.

The film's director, Mikayil Mikayilov, wrote in his memoirs: “Ismet plays a special role in my career. The film was shot at a time when Azerbaijani women threw off their veils and joined public life. I was living in Icheri Sheher. One day a woman in our neighborhood burned herself. I saw it with my own eyes. Since then, I could not forget the tragedy of that woman. But I had not seen the worst case yet. There was a workshop for women at the current Palace of Happiness. I heard that a woman named Sariyya Khalilova, who was participating in the workshops, was brutally murdered by her father and brother in 1933 for throwing off her veil and going to the workshops. I also attended her funeral. There I saw that women took off their veils and threw them under their feet. About the same time, I read an article in the newspaper about Leyla Mammadbeyova, the first Azerbaijani woman pilot. Finally, I started working on the script for Ismet. I combined all of these three topics.”

Leyla Mammadbeyova said about the film: "I met film director Mikayil Mikayilov in the early 1930s after the tragic death of Sariyya Khalilova, an active public figure and one of the founders of the Ali Bayramov Women's Club in Baku. I knew Sariyya well. Although her family did not approve, she was active in the club. Her religiously fanatical relatives did not forgive her for this. Sariyya's funeral turned into a real spectacle. Her tragic death - the brutal murder by her father and brother - shocked all of us, including Mikayil. He decided to convey this story to the audience through a film. But in one film he combined the fate of two people: Sariyya's and mine."

The activities of the Ali Bayramov Women's Club and the work of Khalilova with fellow club founder Jeyran Bayramova were reflected in the 1927 documentary film "Ten Years of October".

== Sources ==
- Oktyabrın on illiyi (film, 1927)
- İsmət (film, 1934)
- Əli Bayramov adına Qadın klubu
