= Juma Mosque, Baku =

Mosque of 12th century in Baku, Azerbaijan

Friday Mosque of Baku
- Azerbaijani: Cümə Məscidi
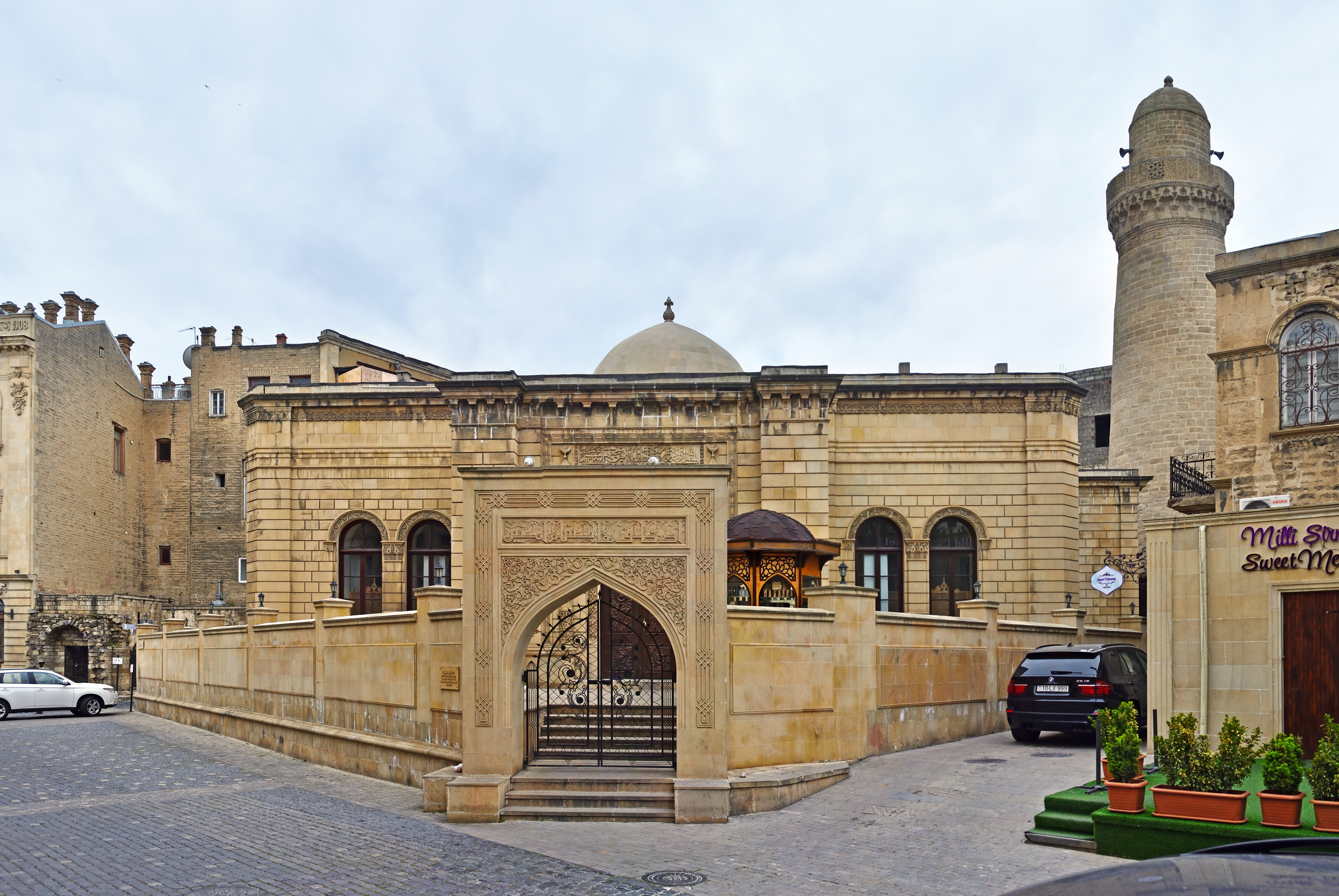
- The mosque and courtyard in 2019

- Location of the mosque in Baku

Religion
- Affiliation: Shia Islam
- Ecclesiastical or organisational status: Mosque (12th century–1928); Profane use (1928–1991); Mosque (since 1991)
- Status: Active

Location
- Location: Baku
- Country: Azerbaijan
- Coordinates: 40°23′43″N 49°52′56″E

Architecture
- Type: Mosque architecture
- Style: Maragha-Nakhchivan (12th c.); Islamic architecture (1899)
- Funded by: Haji Sheikhali Agha Dadashov (1899)
- Completed: 12th century (1st mosque); 1899 (current mosque)
- Minaret: One
- Inscriptions: One

The Juma Mosque (Azerbaijani: Cümə məscidi,), also known as the Friday Mosque, is a Shia Islam mosque, located in Baku, Azerbaijan.

An inscription on the mosque mentions that “Amir Sharaf al-Din Mahmud ordered the restoration of this mosque in the month of Rajab 709 AH (1309/1310 CE)”. On the northern wall of the mosque a minaret was erected which a balcony supported by stalactites in the year of 1437. It was built under the Iranian Shirvansahs.

Located in the historic Icheri Sheher, the mosque has been rebuilt several times. The present Friday Mosque was built in 1899 under the financing of Baku philanthropist merchant Haji Shikhlali Dadashov. There are traces of a Zoroastrian temple at the site.

In the cultural life of the medieval region of Shirvan, the cathedral mosque served as a socio-cultural center.

== History ==
=== First mosque ===
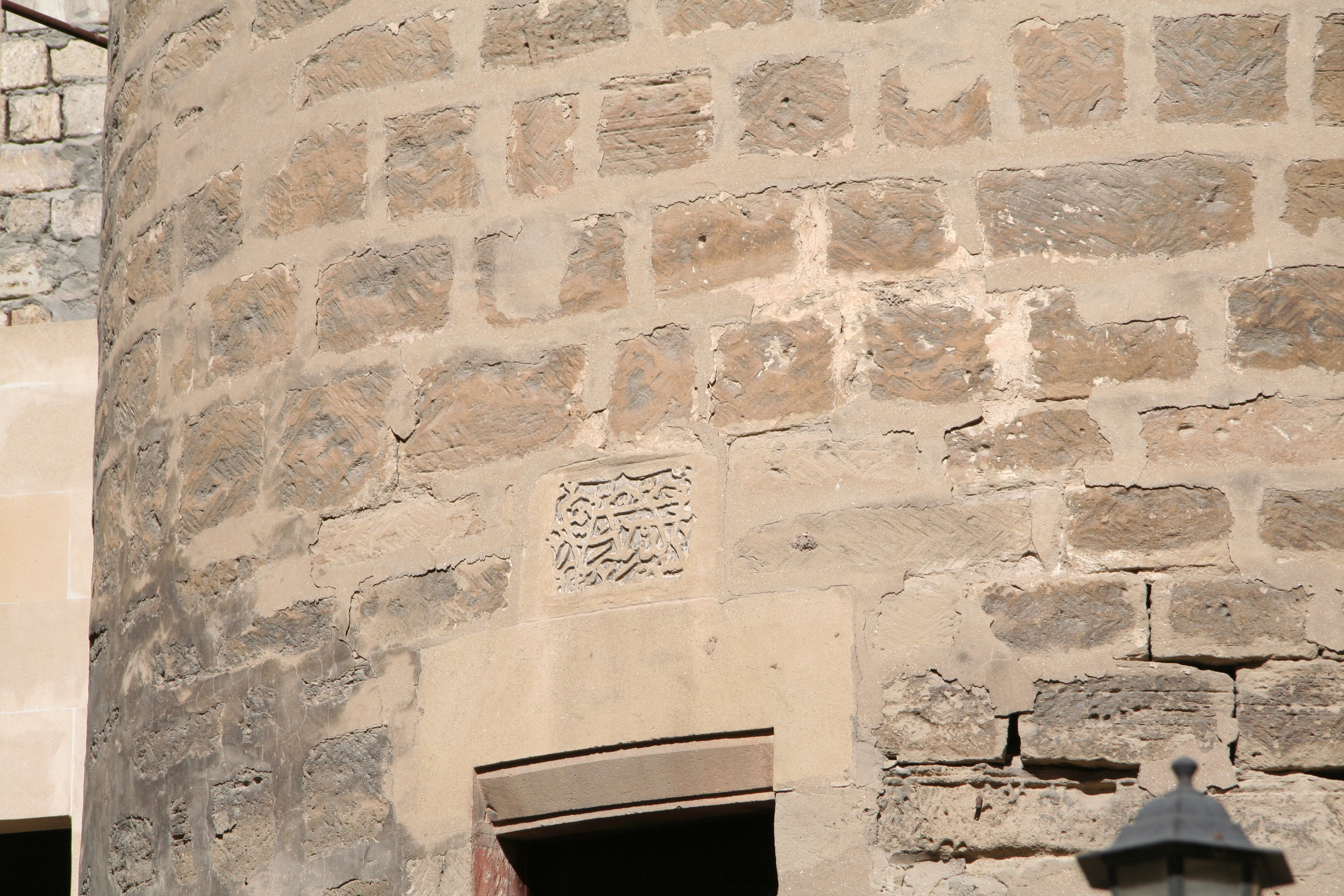
Juma Mosque with kitabe on minaret

The first mosque, called the Jame Mosque, was built in the 12th century. A sophisticated design of the mosque shows that it was built in several stages. Its main parts are a worship hall in the southern part and minarets in the north. There are small yards between the worship hall and the minarets. The most ancient part of the mosque is a square-shaped worship room. The room resembles kiosk mosques of the Seljuk period. Its cover was archaic. According to its exterior, this dome was constructed in the style of the Maragha-Nakhchivan architectural school, which operated in the 12th century.

The ornamental motifs covering the upper part of the dome is found in Seljuk period architectural monuments such as minarets of Shamkir, Garabagh and Atabeklar complex, Maragha Red Gumbez (Dome) Tomb, etc.

Some scientists, in particular, Andrey Pavlinov, believed that the Juma Mosque was built on the remains of a temple of fire-worshipers.

==== Minaret ====
In 1437, on the northern wall of the mosque, the stalactite-shaped minaret was built to call out the worshipers to namaz. On the inscription found in the archeological excavations of the minaret, the text of Mohammed Olcaytun's mourning, head of the Elkhanians, has been engraved.

==== Operating as a Madrasa ====
The rooms of the Jame Mosque were built in the 15th century for educational purposes in the yard of the Mosque. In the nineteenth century, the cells of the Mosque were destroyed due to expansion of A. Zeynalli Street and road construction and just one of them remained to be used as a mosque madrassa.

=== Second mosque ===
The second and current mosque, called the Juma Mosque, was constructed in the remains of the Jame Mosque by Baku millionaire and philanthropist Haji Sheikhali Agha Dadashov in 1899.

The mosque operated as a carpet museum in the Soviet period. The Juma Mosque, which restored its activities as a mosque in the 1990s, was extensively repaired at the expense of the state budget.

The square-shaped worship hall with 4 columns in the central part of the Mosque and small dome are the main components of the Mosque. Oriental and European classic motifs have been used in the building's architecture. The portal is characterized by the typical features of Azerbaijani architecture: stone carvings, national patterns, artistic epigraphs, etc.

In 2008, by the construction specialists, architects and artists, the mosque was completely restored, heating and lighting systems were installed. On the walls of the mosque, hand-made ornaments, surah from Quran have been engraved and the names of the five members of the Ahl al-Bayt, who are sacred in Islam, were written.

== Gallery ==
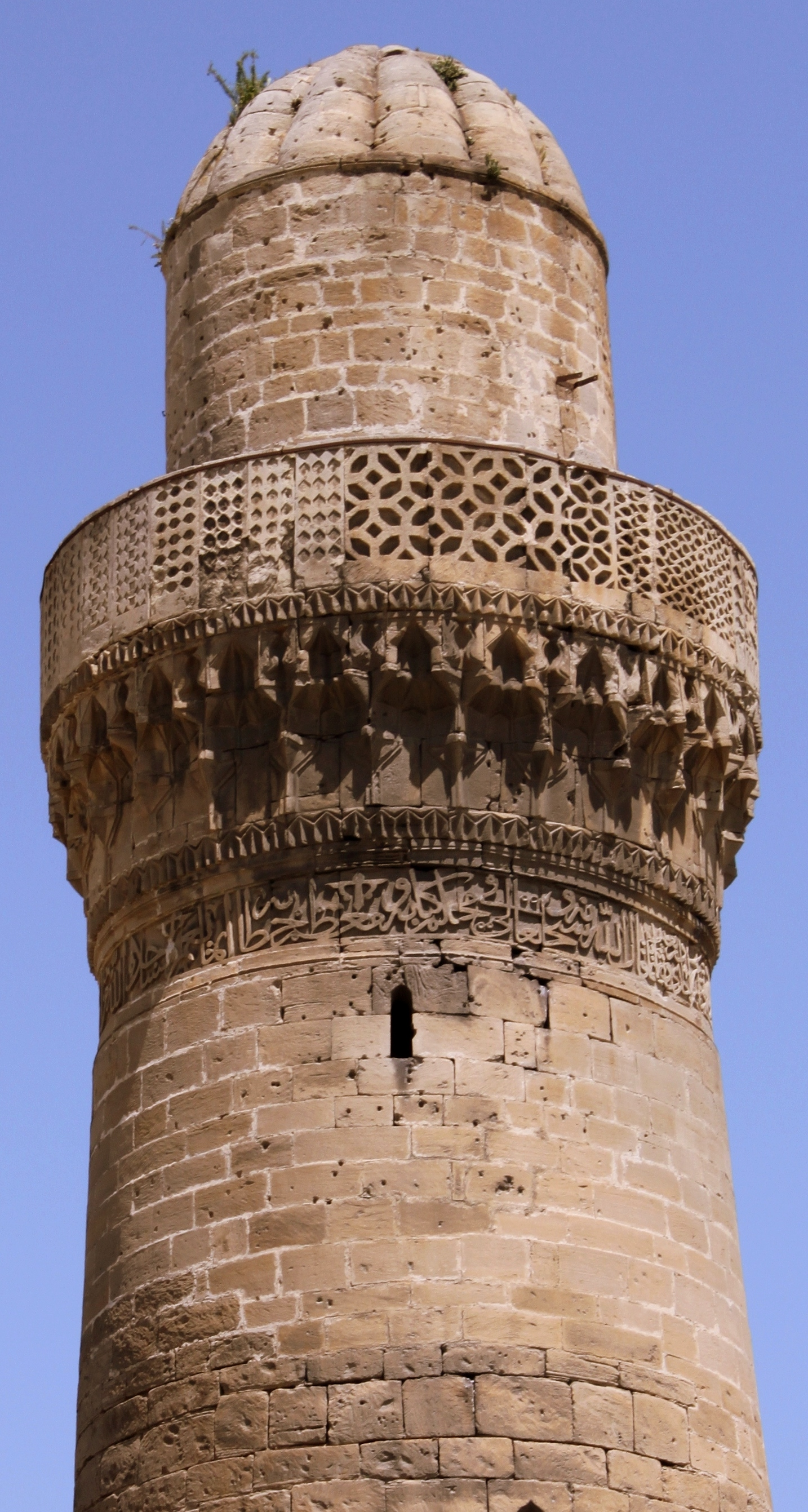

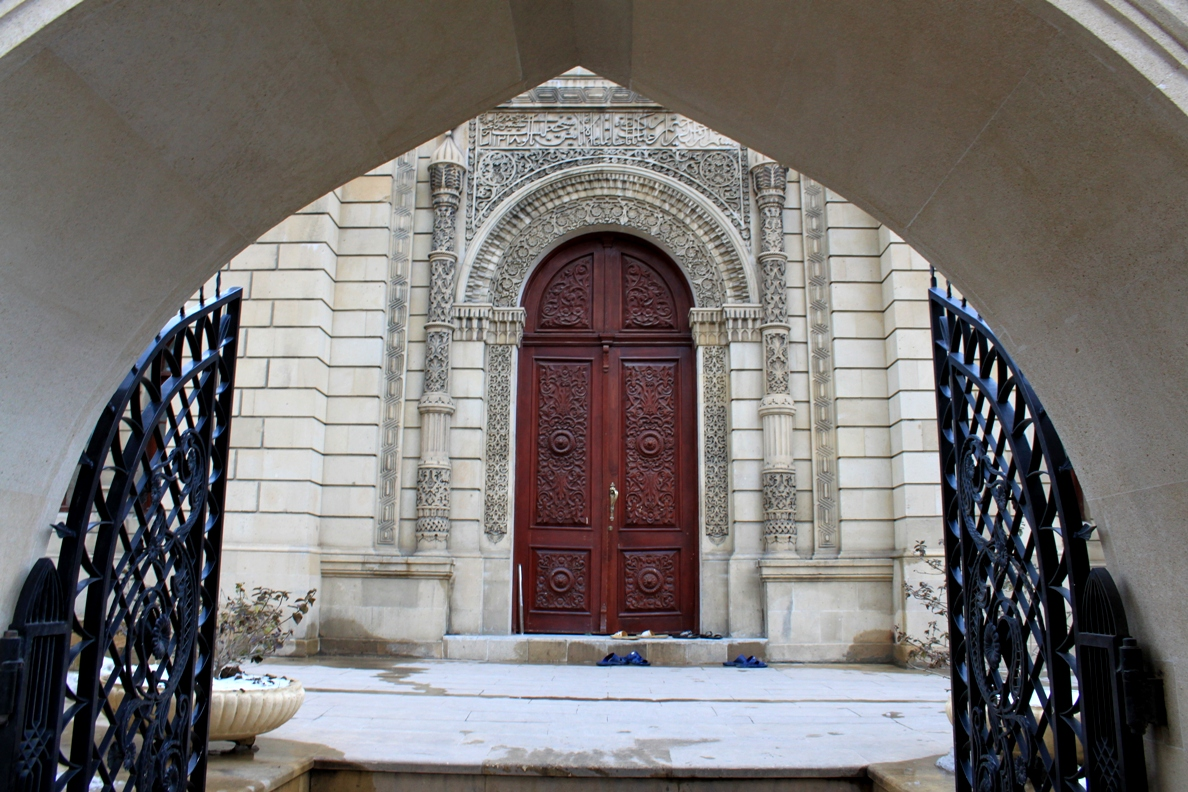

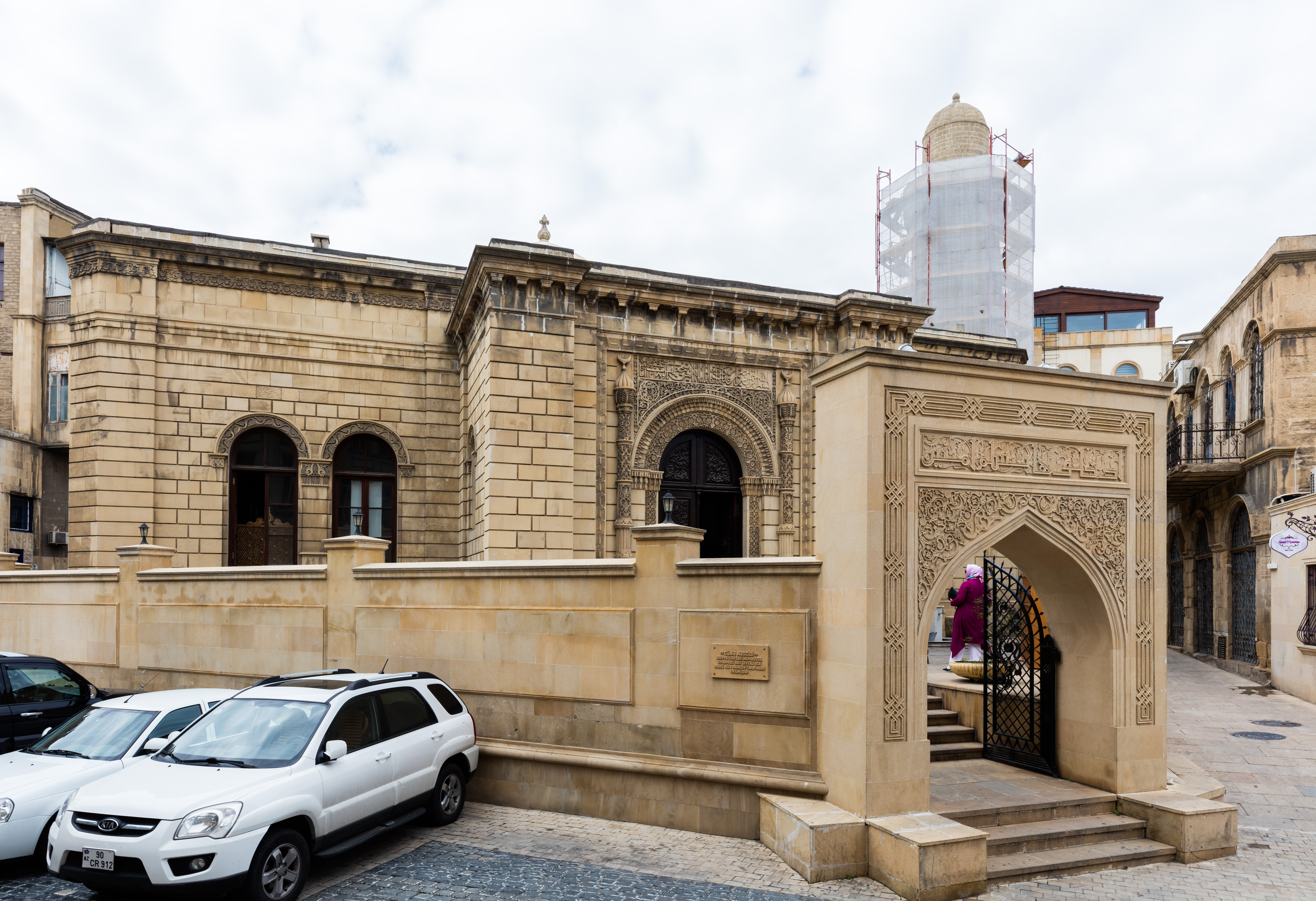

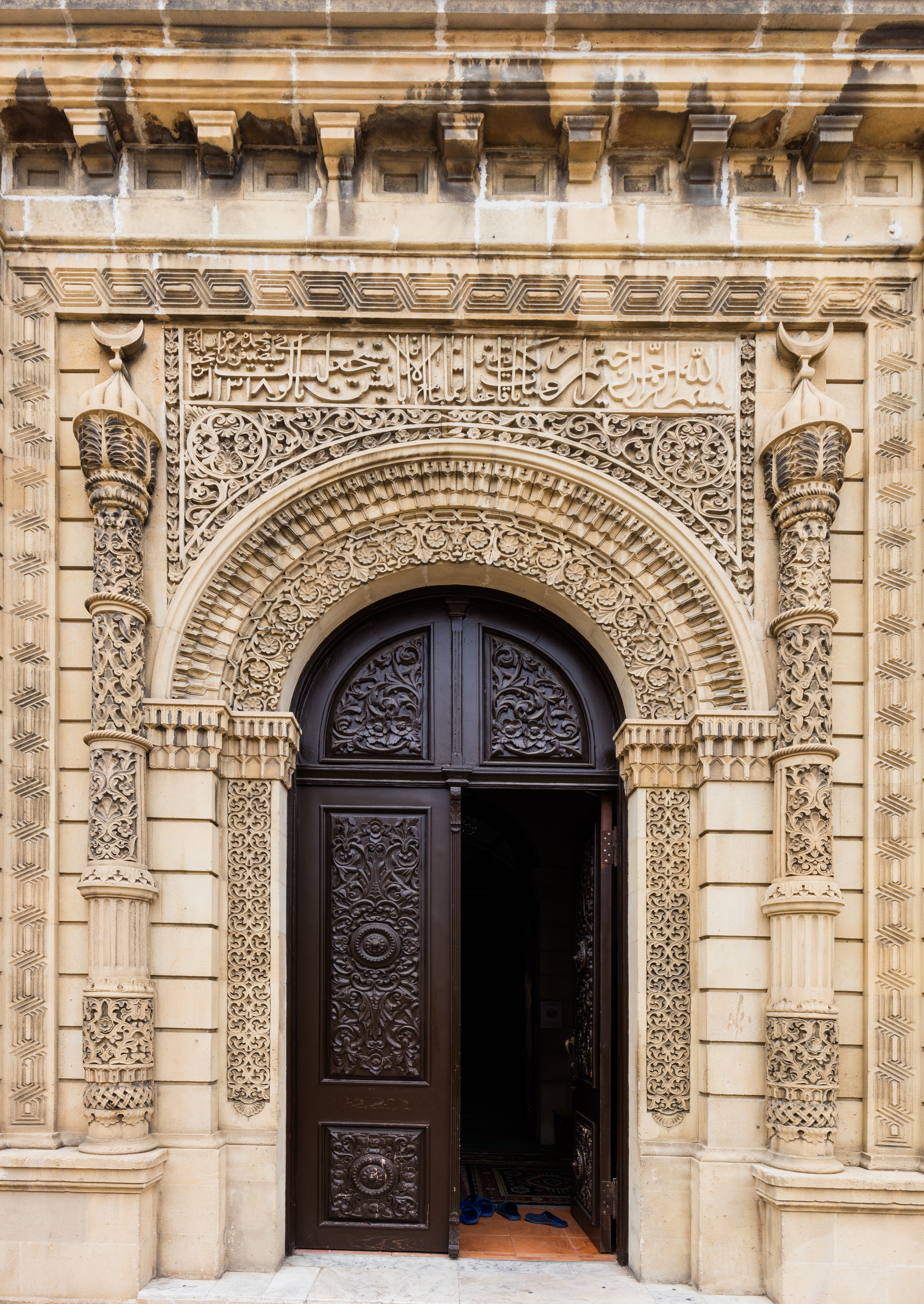

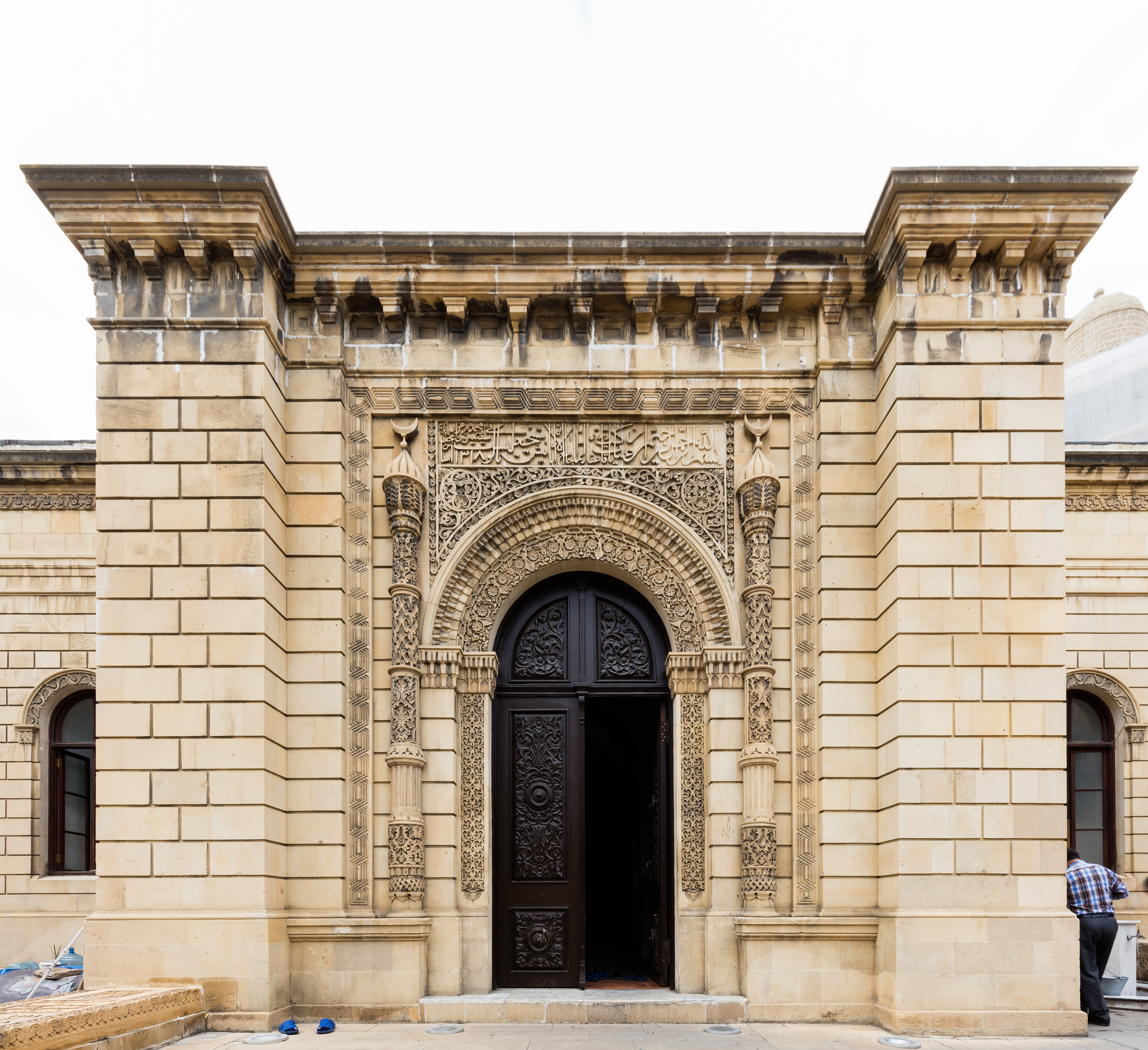

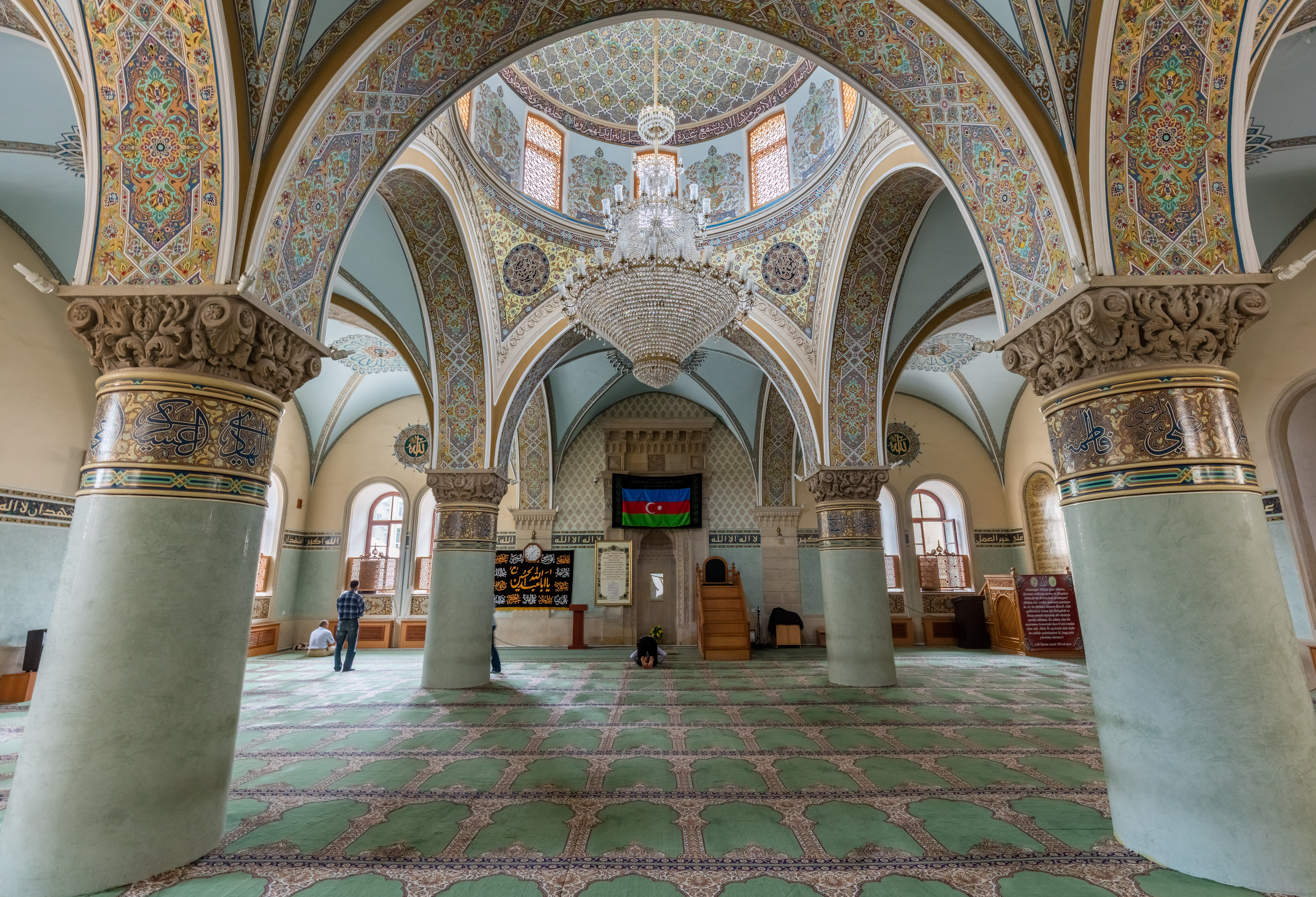

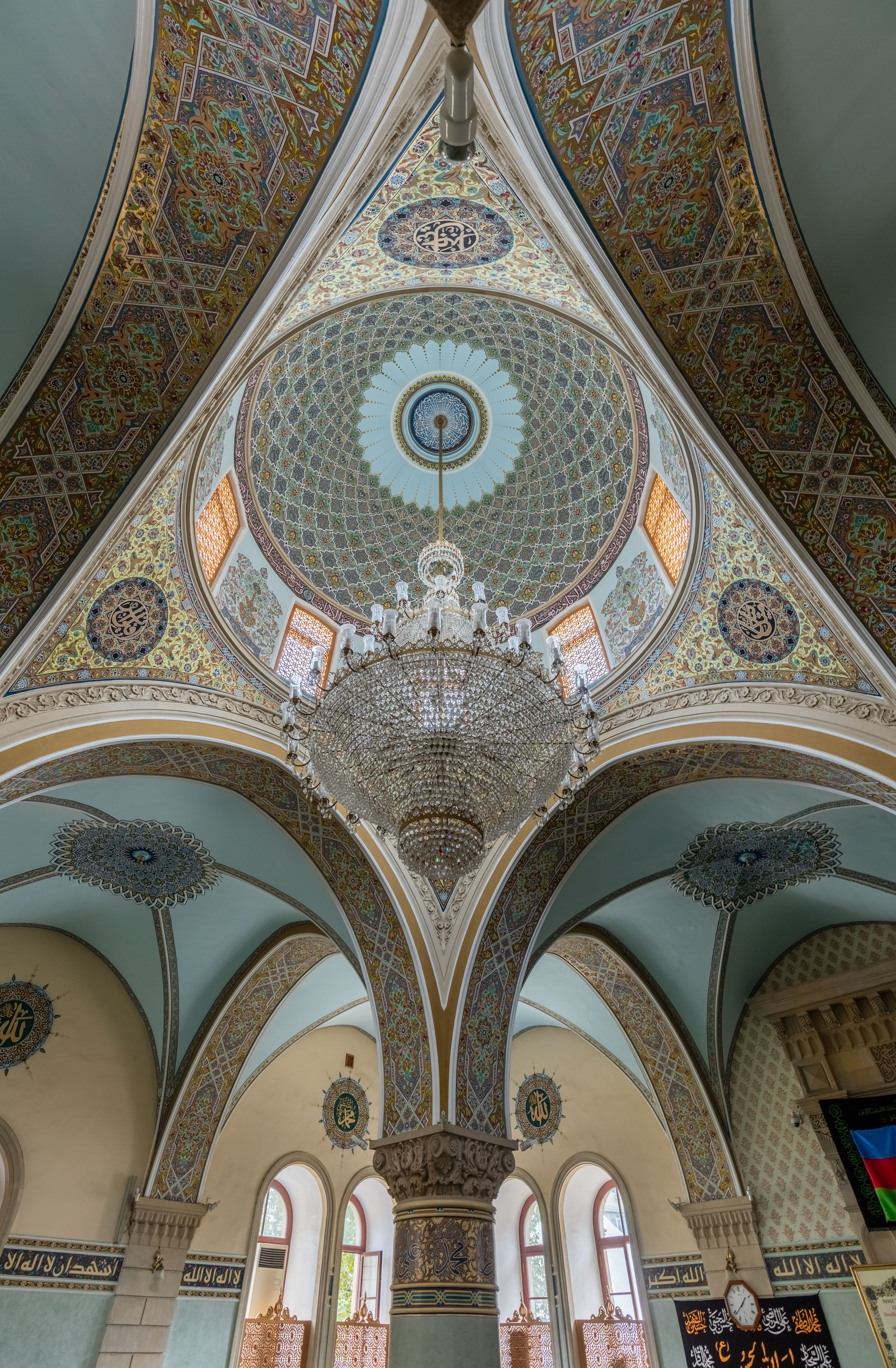

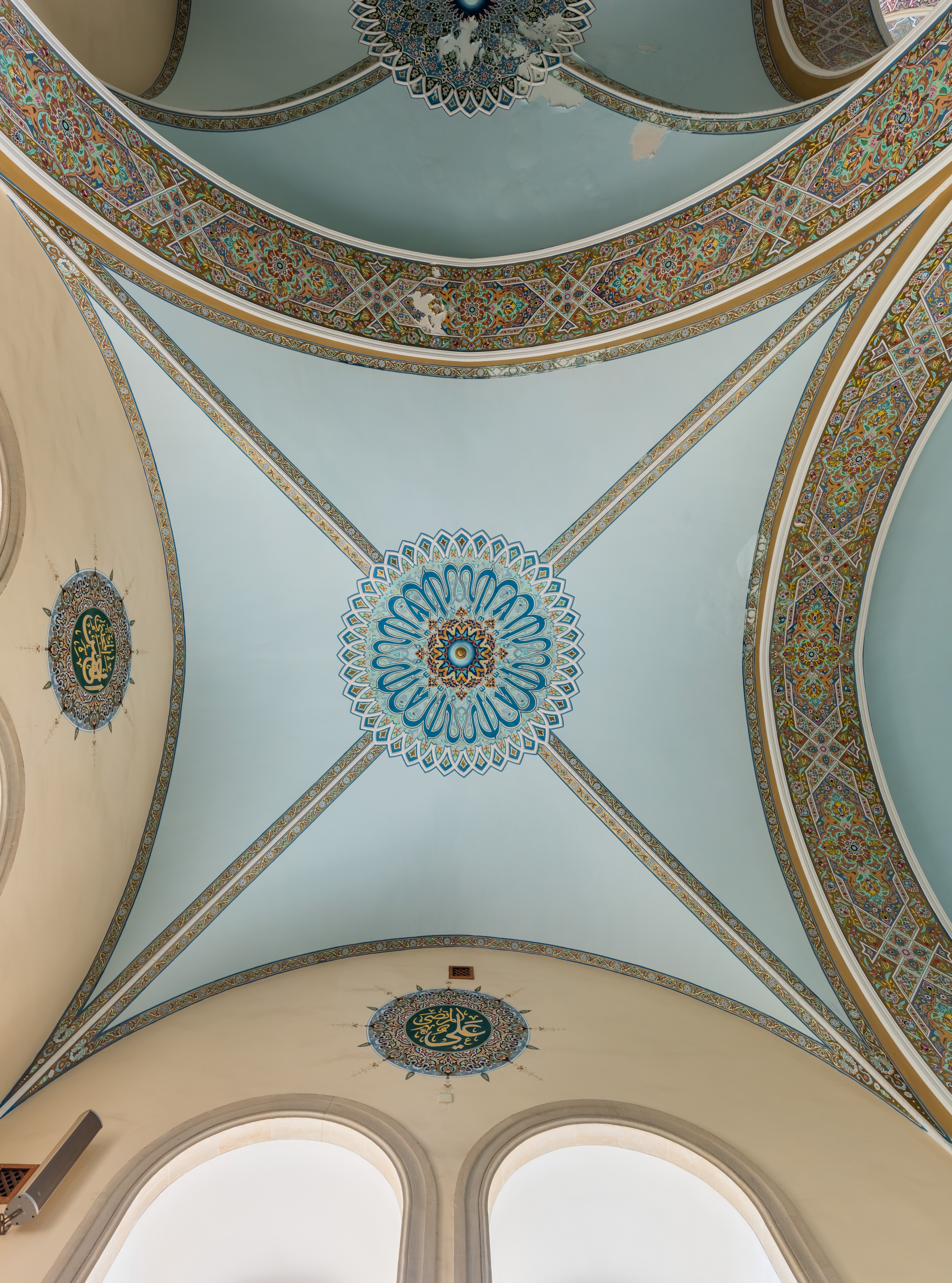

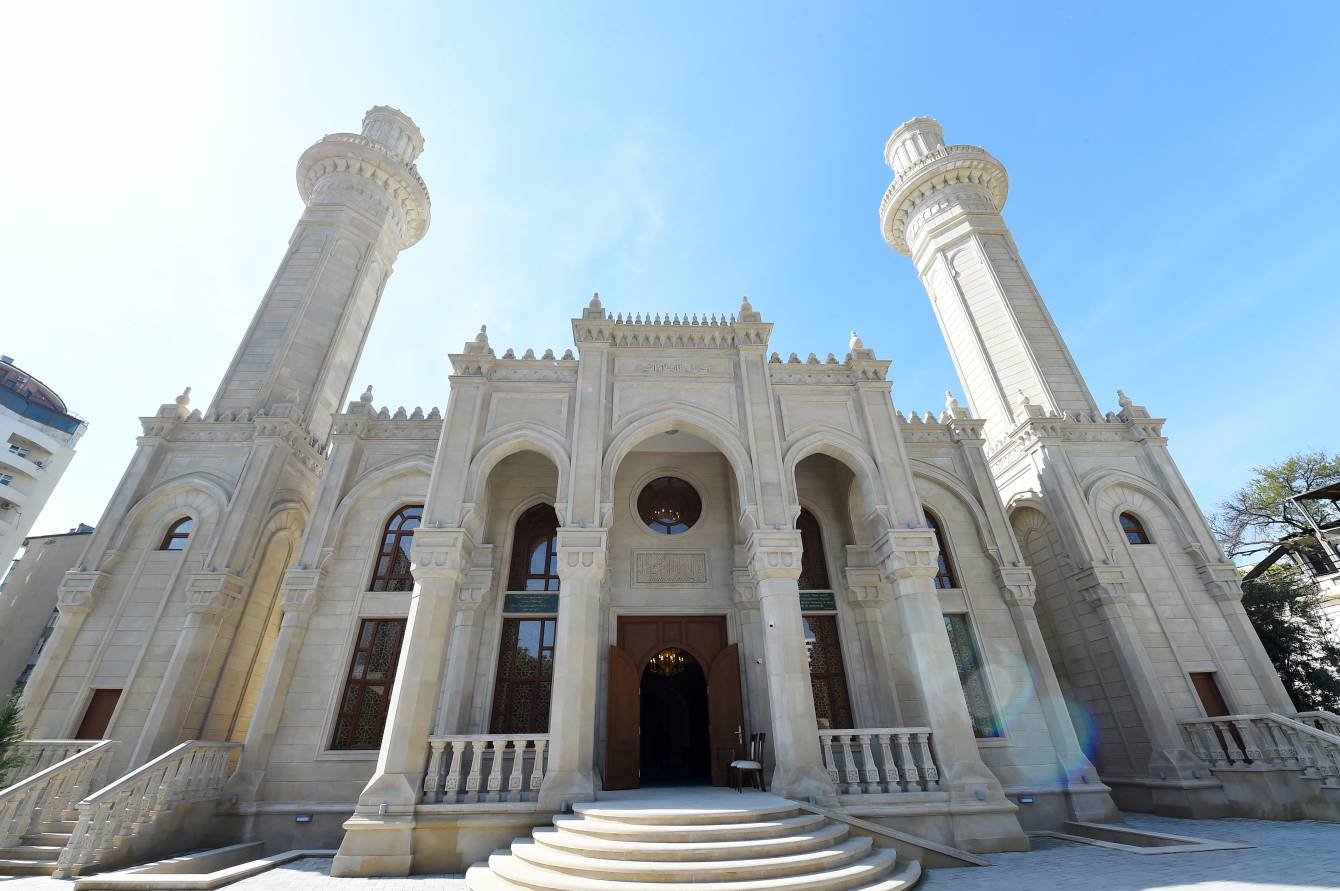

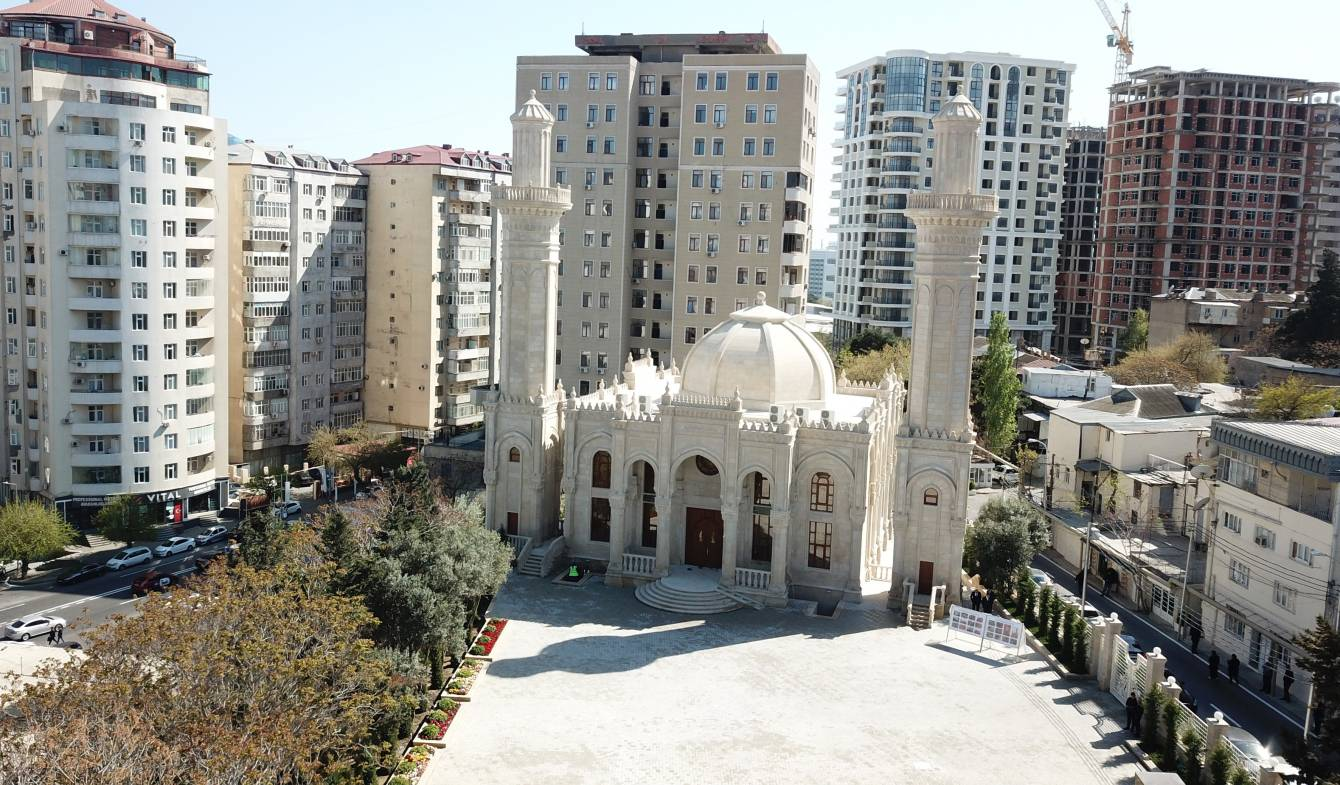

== See also ==
- Shia Islam in Azerbaijan
- List of mosques in Azerbaijan
- List of mosques in Baku
