= House-Museum of Jafar Jabbarly =

Memorial museum in Baku, Azerbaijan

- Azerbaijani: Cəfər Cabbarlının ev-muzeyi
- Location within Azerbaijan
- Established: 1979; 47 years ago
- Location: I. Gutgashinli Street, 44, Baku, Azerbaijan
- Coordinates: 40.367954°N 49.822053°E
- Collection size: 10.000+
- Directors: Gulara Jabbarly; Gamar Seyfaddingizi
- Public transit access: M 2 Elmlar Akademiyasi metro station
- Website: cabbarli.ev-muzeyi.az

The house-museum of Jafar Jabbarly (Azerbaijani: Cəfər Cabbarlının ev muzeyi) is a memorial museum dedicated to the Azerbaijani playwright, poet, director and screenwriter, Jafar Jabbarly (1899–1934).

== History ==
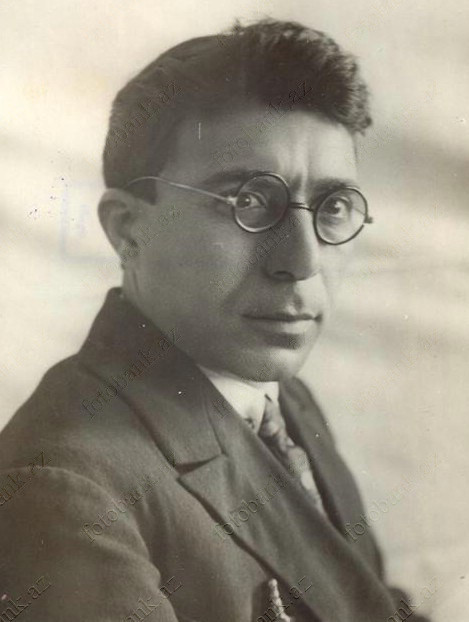
Jafar Jabbarly

The museum is located in a house, where Jafar Jabbarly lived and created, in I. Gutgashinli Street, Baku. It first began operating in 1979 in connection with the 80th anniversary of the writer. During these period, the museum had only 57 exhibits. The official inauguration was held on March 22, 1982. The President of the Republic of Azerbaijan, Heydar Aliyev attended the opening ceremony.

== Exhibition and activity ==
The total area of the museum is 200 m^{2} and it consists of 7 rooms. Currently, over 10,000 exhibits are preserved in the fund of the museum. Documents and photographs reflecting life and creativity of the writer, his rare manuscripts, personal belongings of the writer and his family, used by the writer when he was alive, stage models designed for separate dramatic works, posters and programs from plays, paintings are exhibited to the audience. Also, gifts from prominent personalities to the dramatist, scientific works that investigate the literary heritage of Jabbarly, press examples are between collection of the museum.

The museum compiles and publishes books that consist of works of Jabbarly and his creativity. Also a CD named "I was a Free Bird" which includes composed songs with lyrics of the writer was released by the museum. At the same time, Jabbarly Prize was created in connection with 100th jubilee of the writer and was presented to many artists.
