= Garagoyunlu carpets =

Azerbaijani carpets

Garagoyunlu are Azerbaijani carpets belonging to the Ganja-Gazakh and Karabakh carpet weaving centres. The name of the carpets is related to the names of the Garagoyunlu tribes living on the territory of Azerbaijan.

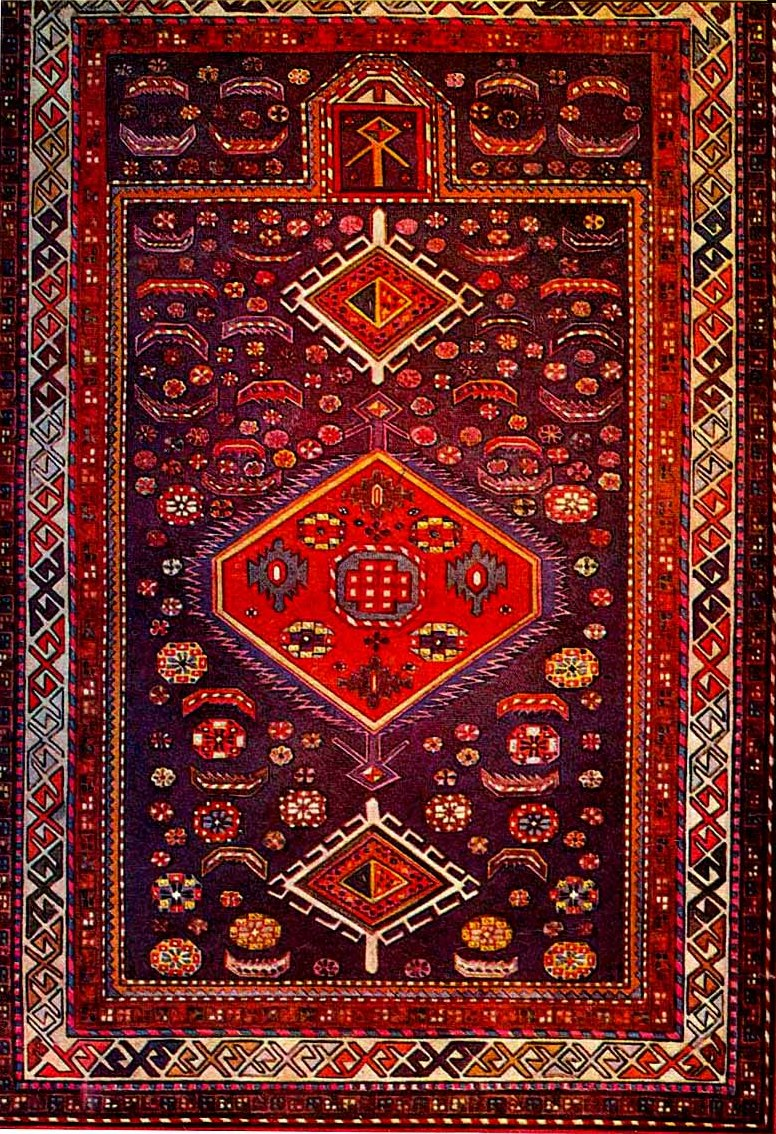
Gara Goyunlu rug, Karabakh school, XVIII c

== Etymology ==
The names of these carpets, which belong to the Gazakh group, are related to the names of the Garagoyunlu tribes that lived on the eastern and northern shores of Goycha Lake. In some Russian sources the name of the district is mentioned as Goychay.

Garagoyunlu is a tribal union of Oghuz Turkmen origin. Such works as Historical Turkmenia and Historical King of Qutbshahi tell the history of Garagoyunlu people, it is shown that the Garagoyunlu people came from Turkestan to Azerbaijan, Iran and Eastern Anatolia in 1202-1203 under the leadership of Tore Bey, the 7th great-grandfather of Kara Yusuf, a descendant of Oghuz, with a population of 30 thousand tents. In 1410, the Garagoyunlu people founded the Garagoyunlu state under the leadership of Kara Yusuf.

At the end of the 19th century, there were 16 villages named Garagoyunlu in the South Caucasus.

The residents of these settlements have been engaged in animal husbandry and agriculture for centuries, as well as in carpet weaving. The villages of Polad, Chaykend, Golkend, Agbulag, Tala, Karvansara and Uzuntala, located in the north and east of Goycha Lake, are distinguished by weaving of Garagoyunlu carpets. The patterns of carpets woven in this region follow the traditions of Central Asian carpet weaving.

== About ==
Garagoyunlu carpets are Azerbaijani carpets belonging to the Ganja-Gazakh and Karabakh carpet weaving centres. The name of the carpets is related to the name of the Garagoyunlu tribe inhabiting the territory of Azerbaijan.

== Artistic analysis ==
These carpets have a medallion composition in several versions.

The first version includes carpets with central field consisting only of polygonal medallions. These medallions, located in the middle area along the vertical axis, are similar in shape to the lakes of Guba Zeyva carpets. According to the information from the Carpet Weavers of the Gazakh-Borchaly Region book by Vidadi Muradov, the first version of the Garagoyunlu carpets are still woven in Tovuz and Gazakh regions, as well as in the Bolnisi region (Georgia), which is inhabited by the Azerbaijanis.

The carpet medallions of the second version are relatively small and their edges are, as per the local carpet weavers, hooked. The name of Garagoyunlu is mentioned in the analysis of carpets belonging to the Jabrayil group, where two animal heads are depicted symmetrically between the medallions. Local carpet makers claim it is a two-headed dragon, while as per the others it is a duck. Let's remember that the peoples of Central Asia including Kyrgyzstan, Gazakhstan, North and North-West Azerbaijan believe that ducks and geese bring prosperity and abundance and treated them as sacred birds. The name of the village Ordakli in Azerbaijan is also related to this belief. In the Guba-Shirvan carpets, some fragments of the carpets of the second variant can be admitted, especially the thin interwoven stripes covering the central field and the small border located nearby.

The old carpet weavers call the carpets belonging to the third version Heykal. Rarely produced today, but they once were popular and fashionable carpets of the Gazakh carpet group. There are three large medallions arranged in a row in the central field. They have broken contours made with broken lines. The central axis of symmetry horizontally divides the middle area into two parts, creating a picture of two full-face human busts. Heykal carpets with the divided into rectangles by straight lines middle area can also be noticed. The borders of the carpet are designed according to the intermediary field and are very specific.

According to its origin, Garagoyunlu carpets are an example of Turkic folk art, and according to their composition – reminiscent of Central Asian and Azerbaijani carpets called Gazakh carpets. Its middle area has two grounds – back and front with a large medallion with toothed images. The upper and lower parts of the medallion are marked with Kohna Nakhish (old pattern) typical of ancient Mughan carpets. The delicate border, which rises from the bottom to the top, breaks 20 cm before the upper corner of the central area and is directed towards the central axis, creating a mihrab (arch), which is bordered by a delicate stripe and has a religious significance and a symbolic meaning typical for prayers. If you look closely, you can see a similarity with the silhouette of a front view of a broad-shouldered person. This fantastic image is one of the stars found by peoples living in the Middle East and Central Asia, where astro worship existed before the Arab invasion. During the Arab-Islamic reign, this symbolic sign began to express the characteristics of the new religion – Islam, and acquired the religious-decorative form of petal and mihrab. In the upper part of the central field, more precisely, in the foreground, as in the background, elements called Beard Comb are arranged. The border surrounding the intermediary field consists of two narrow stripes madakhilis called hamankomenchi and a middle border called chakhmaq (flintstone) with a white background, which is typical for Baku carpets.

== Technical characteristics ==
Garagoyunlu carpets are usually small in size. The knot density of the carpet: 25x25 – 35x35 knots per square decimetre. That is, there are 60,000-120,000 knots per square metre. The height of the pile is 8-11 millimetres. Garagoyunlu carpets belong to the middle category of Gazakh carpets.

== In museums ==
In 2020, the Gazakh carpet Garagoyunlu was included in the collection of flat woven carpets of the Azerbaijan National Carpet Museum. The artistic structure of the Garagoyunlu kilim is made up of both the number and the rhythmic rapports of ornamental horizontal stripes. On the wide stripes, there are images of the pattern called goshagarmag or goshabuynuz (paired horns) belonging to the ancient Oguz tribes. It has been used as a tamga (Turkic tribal symbol) for kilim by the weavers since ancient times. Unlike the narrow simple stripes, other stripes of kilim have the ribbon-like images of the pattern called dolama (wrapping), which symbolises flowing water and enriches the artistic value of the composition.
