= Zakir Baghirov (minister) =

Former Minister of Culture of the Azerbaijan SSR

Zakir Baghirov Zakir Bağırov
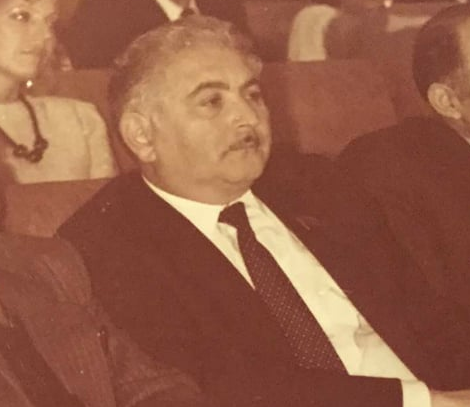

Minister of Culture of the Azerbaijan SSR
- In office 19 February 1971 – 26 December 1988
- Preceded by: Rauf Hajiyev
- Succeeded by: Polad Bülbüloğlu

Personal details
- Born: December 21, 1929 Shusha, Nagorno-Karabakh Autonomous Oblast, Azerbaijan, TSFSR, USSR
- Died: March 31, 1989 (aged 59) Baku, Azerbaijan SSR, USSR
- Education: Moscow Aviation Institute; Azerbaijan State University
- Awards: Order of the Red Banner of Labour

Zakir Nariman oghlu Baghirov (Azerbaijani: Zakir Nəriman oğlu Bağırov, December 21, 1929 – March 31, 1989) was as Azerbaijani statesman who served as the Minister of Culture of the Azerbaijan SSR from 1971 to 1988, and deputy of the Supreme Soviet of the Azerbaijan SSR.

== Biography ==
Zakir Baghirov was born on December 21, 1929, in Shusha. He studied at Moscow Aviation Institute. However, after breaking his leg, Baghirov stopped pursuing his career as a pilot. After returning to Baku from Moscow, he decided to continue his education after a long period of medical treatment.

In 1953, Zakir Baghirov graduated from Azerbaijan State University and pursued his postgraduate education at the Institute of Philosophy of the USSR Academy of Sciences. Zakir Baghirov returned to Azerbaijan after graduation and was appointed head of the philosophy department at the Azerbaijan Academy of Sciences.

During Zakir Baghirov's tenure as Minister, the Baku Choreography School was built, the Song Theatre was established, the house-museums of Uzeyir Hajibeyov, Samad Vurgun and Jafar Jabbarly were opened, and the Azerbaijani circus team was established.

Zakir Baghirov visited Turkey in 1987 to expand Soviet Union–Turkey relations and met with Minister of Culture and Tourism Mesut Yilmaz.

Zakir Baghirov died on March 31, 1989, in Baku.
