= List of museums in Baku =

This is a list of museums in Baku, the capital city of Azerbaijan.

== List ==
The name of museums	Picture	Established
House-Museum of Abdulla Shaig		1990
Museum of Archaeology and Ethnography		1981
Azerbaijan State Museum of History of Religion		1967
Azerbaijan State Agriculture Museum		1924
House-Museum of Jalil Mammadguluzadeh		1978
National Art Museum of Azerbaijan		1936
House-Museum of Bulbul		1976
National Museum of History of Azerbaijan		1920
Hasanbey Zardabi Natural History Museum		1930
House-Museum of Leopold and Mstislav Rostropovich		1998
Azerbaijan Carpet Museum		1967
Azerbaijan Railway Museum		2019
Institute of Manuscripts of Azerbaijan		1986
Baku Museum of Miniature Books		2002
House-Museum of Mammed Said Ordubadi (Baku)		1979
Nizami Museum of Azerbaijani Literature		1939
House-Museum of Nariman Narimanov		1977
Gobustan National Park		1996
Rinay		1989
House-Museum of Samad Vurgun		1975
Uzeyir Hajibeyov's House Museum		1975
House-Museum of Sattar Bahlulzade		2014
House-Museum of Azim Azimzade		1968
Azerbaijan State Theatre Museum		1934
ANAS House-Museum of Huseyn Javid		1981
Azerbaijan Medicine Museum		1986
Azerbaijan State Museum of Musical Culture		1967
