= List of Azerbaijani films of the 1970s =

A list of earliest films produced in Azerbaijan SSR ordered by year of release in the 1970s:

Films:1918–1990 see also List of Soviet films

== 1970s ==
Title	Director	Cast	Genre	Notes
1970
Abşeron Ritmləri; Rhythms of Absheron				
Axtarış Həvəsi				
Aslan və İki Öküz				
Ayı və Siçan				
Azərbaycan, Azərbaycan				
Azərbaycan İncəsənəti				
Azərbaycanın Faunası				
Azərbaycanın Florası				
Bakı Haqqında 10 Dəqiqə				
Beyləqan Əcdadlarımızın Torpağıdır				TV film
Bizim 29-cu Ordenli				
Bizim 416				
Cənnətin Qəbzi				
Cücələrim				
Çörək				
Dilbər				
Diş Ağrısı				
Əgər Bütün Dünyanın Oğlanları				
Fitnə				
Foto "Fantaziya"				
General(film)				
General Aslanov				
Güləş				
Xəzərin Qonaqları				
Xəzinə				
İntizar				
Qardaşlaşmış Şəhərlər				
Qurultaydan Qurultaya				
Lenin Bizimlədir				
Mexanizatorlar Ailəsi				
Məhəbbət və Əbədiyyət				
Mən Bakı Fəhləsiyəm				
Mənim Xəzərim				
Neftçi Qurban				
Nəsrimizin Ağsaqqalı				
O Qızı Tapın				
Polşada Azərbaycan Günləri				
Sevil				
Sevil Qazıyeva				
Sevinc Sarayı				
Səhhət				
Sovet Azərbaycanının 50 İlliyi				
Sovet Azərbaycanının Yarım Əsrlik Salnaməsi				TV film
Suriyada				
Şərqdə Birinci				
Şövkətin Mahnıları				
Texniki Vasitələr Kompleksində				
Toyda Görüş				
Ürəkdən-Ürəyə				
Yeddi Oğul İstərəm				
1971
1972
1973
Mahni Qanadlarinda; Songs From the Wings				
1974
Pispisa khanum and Mouse bey				
1975
1976
1977
Ad Gunu; Birthday				
Daş; The Stone				
1978
Qız qalası əfsanəsi Legend of the Maiden Tower				
1979
Babek	Eldar Kuliyev			
