= House Museum of Abdulla Shaig =

Museum in Baku, Azerbaijan

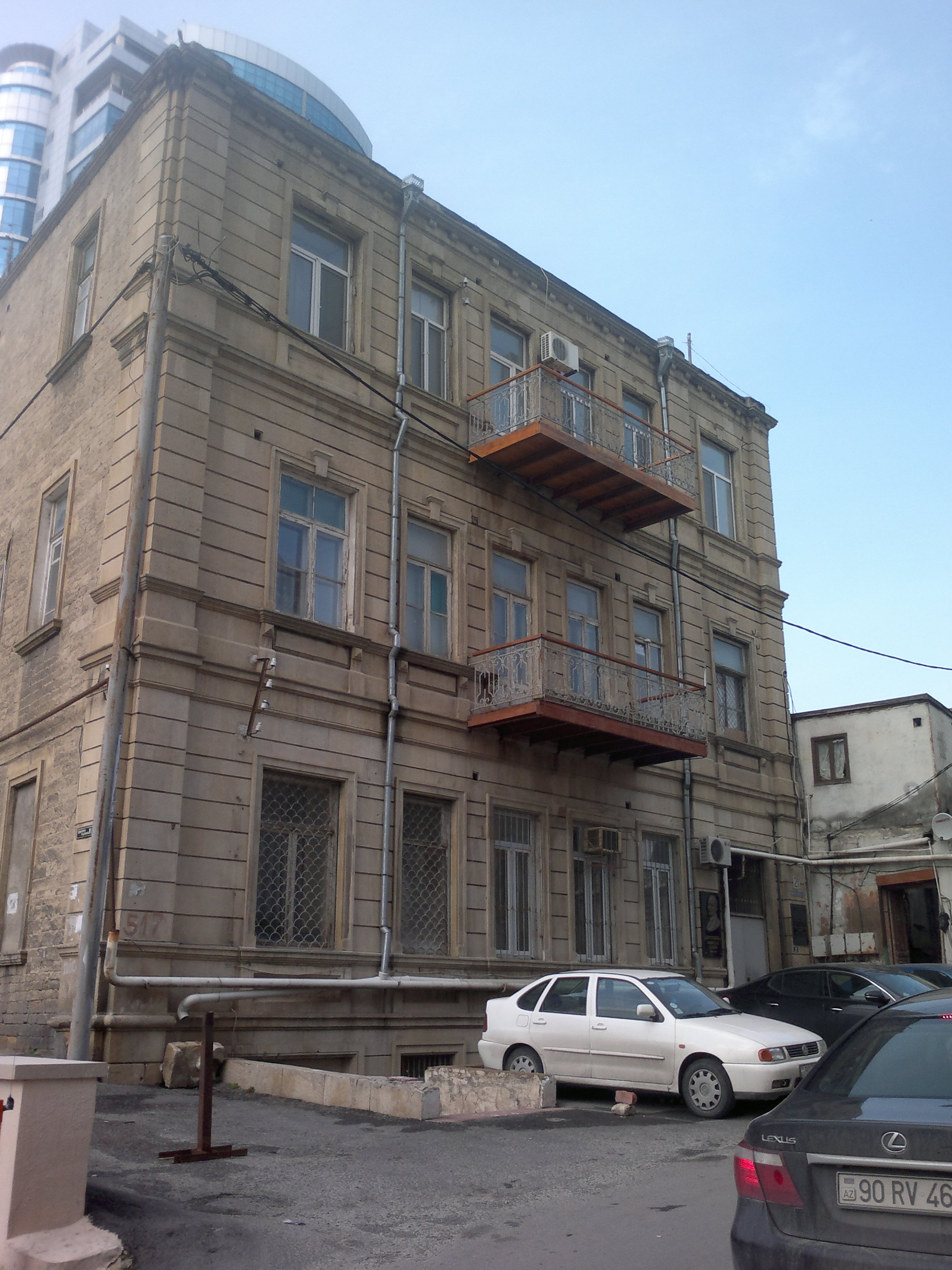
- Coordinates: 40°22′30″N 49°49′31″E

Abdulla Shaig's House Museum is dedicated to the famous Azerbaijani writer Abdulla Shaig and is under the control of the Ministry of Culture and Tourism of the Republic of Azerbaijan. It is located on the second floor of a historical building in Baku that was constructed in 1905.

== History ==
In 1900, Abdullah Shaig moved from Tbilisi to Baku and lived in a small apartment in Icheri Sheher with his mother Mehri and his brother Yusuf Ziya Talibzade. Shortly after, he rented several apartments in different parts of the city and, finally, in 1916 moved to a five-room apartment that located on the 2nd floor of the building on Upper Mountain Street (now called A. Shaig Street) where he lived until the end of his life (1957). Ahmed Javad, Huseyn Javid, Jafar Jabbarly, Mikayil Mushfig, Samad Vurgun, and other Azerbaijani intellectuals often used to visit the writer in this house. The writer also occasionally used to meet in this apartment with his students and even schoolchildren for giving advice and instructions.

The museum was founded for the first time by elder son of the writer, academic Kamal Talibzade and opened to the public since 2001.

== Exhibitions ==
The Abdullah Shaig Memorial Museum consists of four rooms. In the first room (used as a kitchen) the own books of the writer and his various translations of world-known works such as “Shahnameh”, “Macbeth”, “Gulliver”, “Robinson Crusoe”, and etch are exhibited.

The living room is used to hang the portraits of his families: Yusif Ziya Talibzade (his elder brother), his wife Shahzade khanim. There is also a carpet that depicts the writer and his son Kamal.

The most of pedagogical activities and his works related to children's drama is displayed in the third room.

In the fourth room (used to be office of Abdulla Shaig) a large number of his personal objects were collected. Here the most valuable exhibit is a desk, which the writer did not change until the end of his life.

Overall, the museum is claimed to have over 4,000 exhibits in four rooms: writer's books, photos, and personal objects like pen, watch and glasses. Ulker Talibzade (granddaughter of Abdulla Shaig) is the director of the museum.

== See also ==
Official Webpage of the House Museum of Abdulla Shaig

List of museums in Baku

List of museums in Azerbaijan
