= Yusif Ziya Talibzadeh =

Azerbaijani politician and soldier

Yusif Ziya Talibzadeh Yusif Ziya Talıbzadə
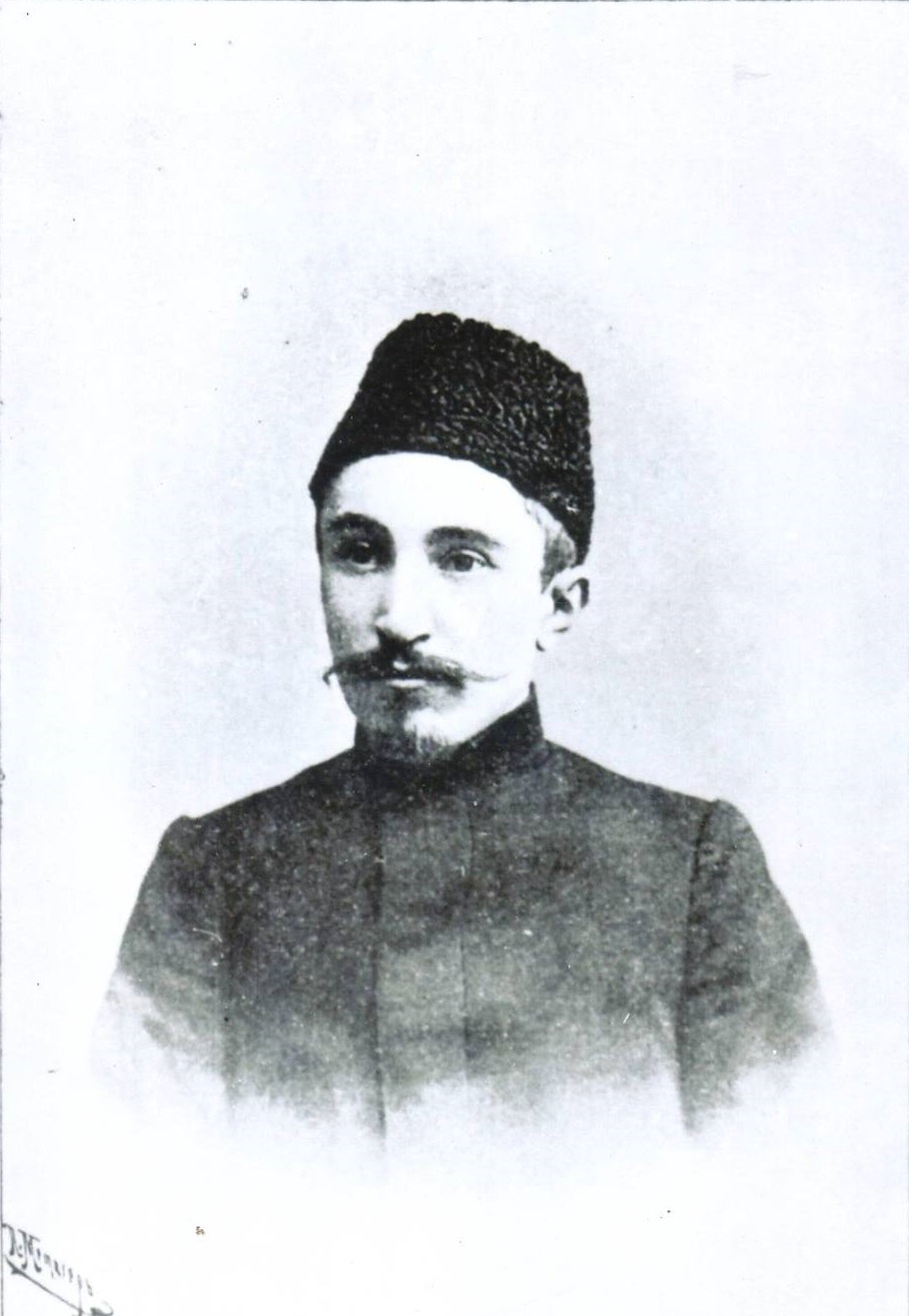

1st Military Commissar of the Nakhchivan Autonomous Soviet Socialist Republic
- In office July 1920 – September 1921
- Preceded by: position was established

Member of the Revolutionary Committee of the Nakhchivan Autonomous Soviet Socialist Republic
- In office July 1920 – September 1921

Personal details
- Born: October 11, 1877 Tiflis, Tiflis Governorate, Russian Empire
- Died: May 18, 1923 (aged 45) Khwarazm
- Party: Musavat

Military service
- Battles/wars: Balkan Wars; World War I Battle of Goychay; Basmachi movement

Yusif Ziya Talibzadeh, Akhund Yusif Talibzadeh or Yusif Talibzadeh Tiflisi (Azerbaijani: Yusif Ziya Talibzadə) was as an Azerbaijani educator, politician, playwrighter, and soldier.

He wrote the dramas "Armanusa" and "Amir Khalid bin Walid" and dozens of books. He wrote publicist articles in newspapers and magazines published at that time.

He participated in the Balkan wars and the First World War. He led the Azerbaijani volunteers who fought in the Balkan wars. He rose to the rank of colonel in the Ottoman army. In 1918, he came to Azerbaijan together with the Caucasian Islamic Army for the liberation of Baku. He led the auxiliary regiment of volunteers of the Caucasus Islamic Army.

From February 1921, he started working as a member of the Nakhchivan Revolutionary Committee. He was appointed as the military commissar of Nakhchivan in the rank of general.

He participated in the Basmachi movement and fought against the Bolsheviks. He died on May 18, 1923, in one of the battles against the Bolsheviks.

== Biography ==
Yusif Ziya Talibzadeh was born on January 22, 1877 in Shaitanbazar neighborhood in Tiflis. He received his first education at the Rushdia school located in Tiflis under the Transcaucasia spiritual administration. In 1894, he moved to Khorasan with his family. During his studies there he was influenced by his teacher from Urmia, Yusif Ziya, and took the nickname "Ziya". At the request of his father, he entered the Mirza Jafar madrasa and received spiritual education here. After graduating here, he completed his education in Baghdad. During his studies, he learned Turkish, Arabic, Persian and Russian languages perfectly. In 1899, he returned to Tiflis with his mother. Here he passed the exam at the Transcaucasian Clergy Department and received the rank of akhund. Although he was appointed to the Shah Abbas Mosque for service, he refused and moved to Baku in 1900.

== Activity ==
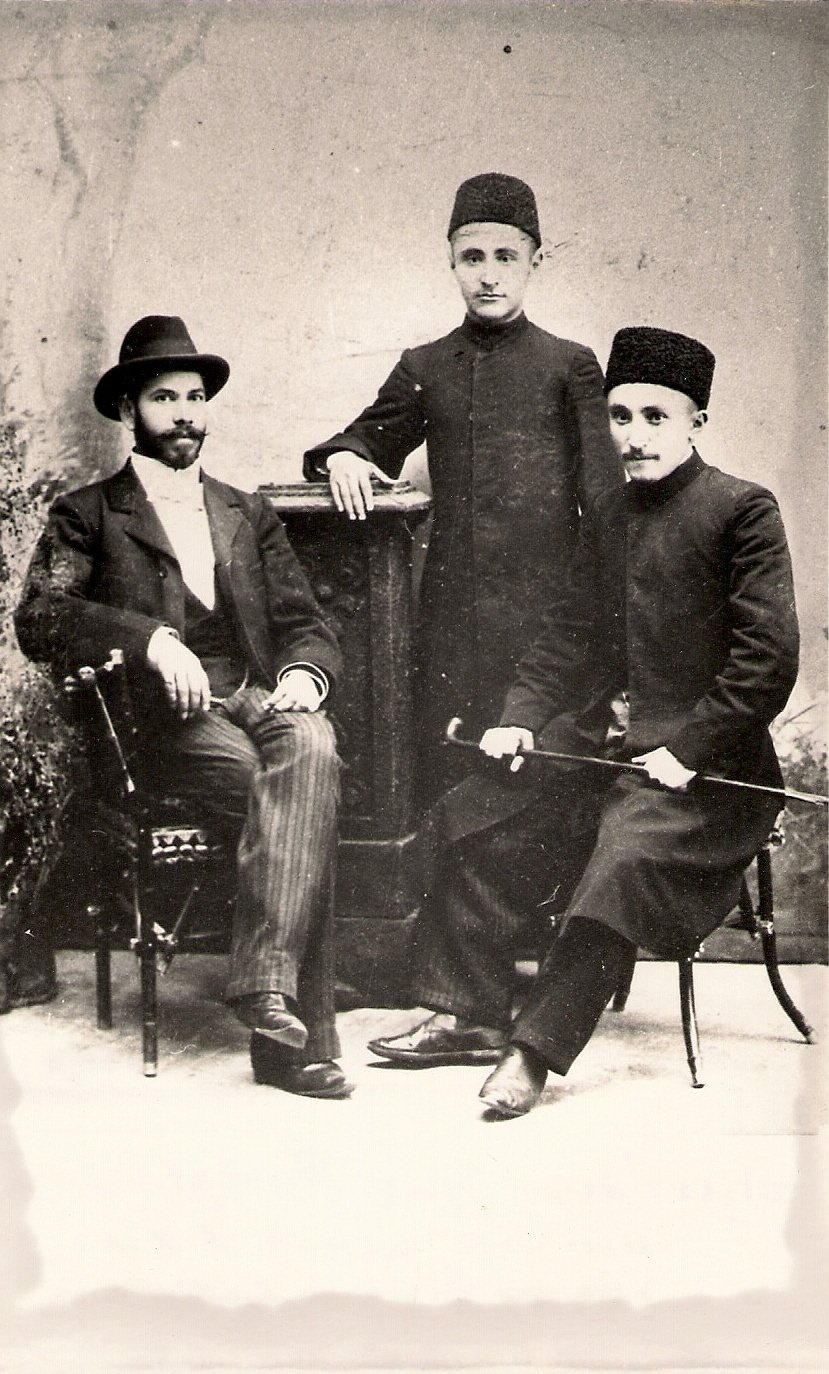
Mirza Taghi Rzayev, Abdulla Shaig and Yusif Ziya Talibzadeh. Tiflis, 1903

After arriving in Baku, on September 15, 1900, he passed the inspection commission to work in the Russian-Tatar school. After successfully passing the exam, a sharia teacher is appointed to the school. After moving to Baku, he met Haji Zeynalabdin Taghiyev, Nariman Narimanov, Habib Bey Mahmudbeyov and other intellectuals. In 1902, "Tahsili-gavaid" related to the grammar of the Azerbaijani language, and in 1903 "Hadiyyi-nisvan", which talks about the education of women in the Islamic world, and "The biography of Mr. Haji Zeynalabdin Taghiyev, famous for his wealth and generosity", dedicated to Haji Zeynalabdin Taghiyev, "Teacher-Sharia", in 1904 "Tealumush-Sharia", in 1905 "The Truth of Islam", in 1907 "Islam History", in 1913 "Letters from Turkey" were published. In 1900–1910, various publishers of Baku published more than 10 booklets and treatises on topics related to Islam. The book "Muallimus-Sharia" was published three times in 1903, 1908, 1909. He translated Nariman Narimanov's "Nadir Shah" into Persian. In 1904, in Baku, he printed a map called "Islamic history and historical-historical map of places and map of Islamic countries".

In addition to his scientific and pedagogical activities, he also published journalistic articles in newspapers and magazines published at that time. Since 1903, articles on Islam have been published in "Sharqi-rus" newspaper. From 1905 to 1913, articles signed by "Akhund Yusif Talibzade" were published in newspapers and magazines such as "Hayat", "Irshad", "Fuyuzat", "Taraqqi", "Yeni fuyuzat", "Shalala".

After the Quran was first translated into Azerbaijani by Mirmohammed Karim Mirjafarzadeh, it was printed with the financial support of Haji Zeynalabdin Taghiyev. One of the printed books was sent as a gift to the Ottoman sultan Abdulhamid II. Yusif Ziya Talibzade was assigned to deliver this gift and Haji Zeynalabdin Taghiyev's letter to the sultan. Based on the article written by Naghi Bey Sheykhzamanli in 1957, the gifted book was decorated with precious jewelry and diamonds worth 4,000 gold lira. According to the article written by Kamal Talibzadeh in 1992, 50 of the books were printed with gold water and were made valuable. And the cover of the gifted book was made of thick silver, and the words "La ilaha illallah, Muhammedan Rasulillah" were written in the middle.

Since 1910, he started more social and political activities. In 1910, he published his work "Letters from Turkey" about his days in Turkey. He writes journalistic articles in the press. He wrote the dramas "Armenusa" and "Amir Khalid bin Walid". The tragedy "Armenusa" was performed in 1910, and the tragedy "Amir Khalid bin Walid" in 1912 by the drama team of Nijat society.

He is one of the first members of the Musavat party established in 1911.

=== In the Ottoman Empire ===
In 1912, he moved to the Ottoman Empire with his wife Cennat Khanum and son Talat. He studied at a military school here. He participated in the Balkan wars and the First World War. He led the Azerbaijani volunteers who fought in the Balkan wars. He participated in the First World War. He participated in battles on the fronts of Kars, Ardahan and Batum. He rose to the rank of colonel in the Ottoman army.

=== In the Azerbaijani Democratic Republic ===
In 1918, he came to Azerbaijan with the Caucasian Islamic Army for the liberation of Baku. He participated in Goychay battles. He led the auxiliary regiment of volunteers of the Caucasian Islamic Army.

On June 10, 1919, at the meeting of the State Defence Committee of the Azerbaijani Democratic Republic, it was decided to organize military training for those who have reached the age of military conscription living in the territory of the city of Baku and its districts. Yusif Ziya bey Talibzadeh was appointed as the chairman of the commission for the organization of volunteer groups, and they gave him a monthly salary of five thousand rubles. This organization, which operates as a group of volunteer soldiers, has fulfilled the duties of maintaining order and peace in the country, and preventing illegal actions. This regiment named "Voluntary Auxiliary Regiment" was placed under the control of the Ministry of Internal Affairs of the Azerbaijani Democratic Republic on March 27, 1920, by the decision of the State Defense Committee of the Azerbaijani Democratic Republic.

During the republic, he published articles on politics, education and culture in many newspapers and magazines, mainly in "Azerbaijan" newspaper as an activist of the "Musavat" party.

=== South Azerbaijan ===
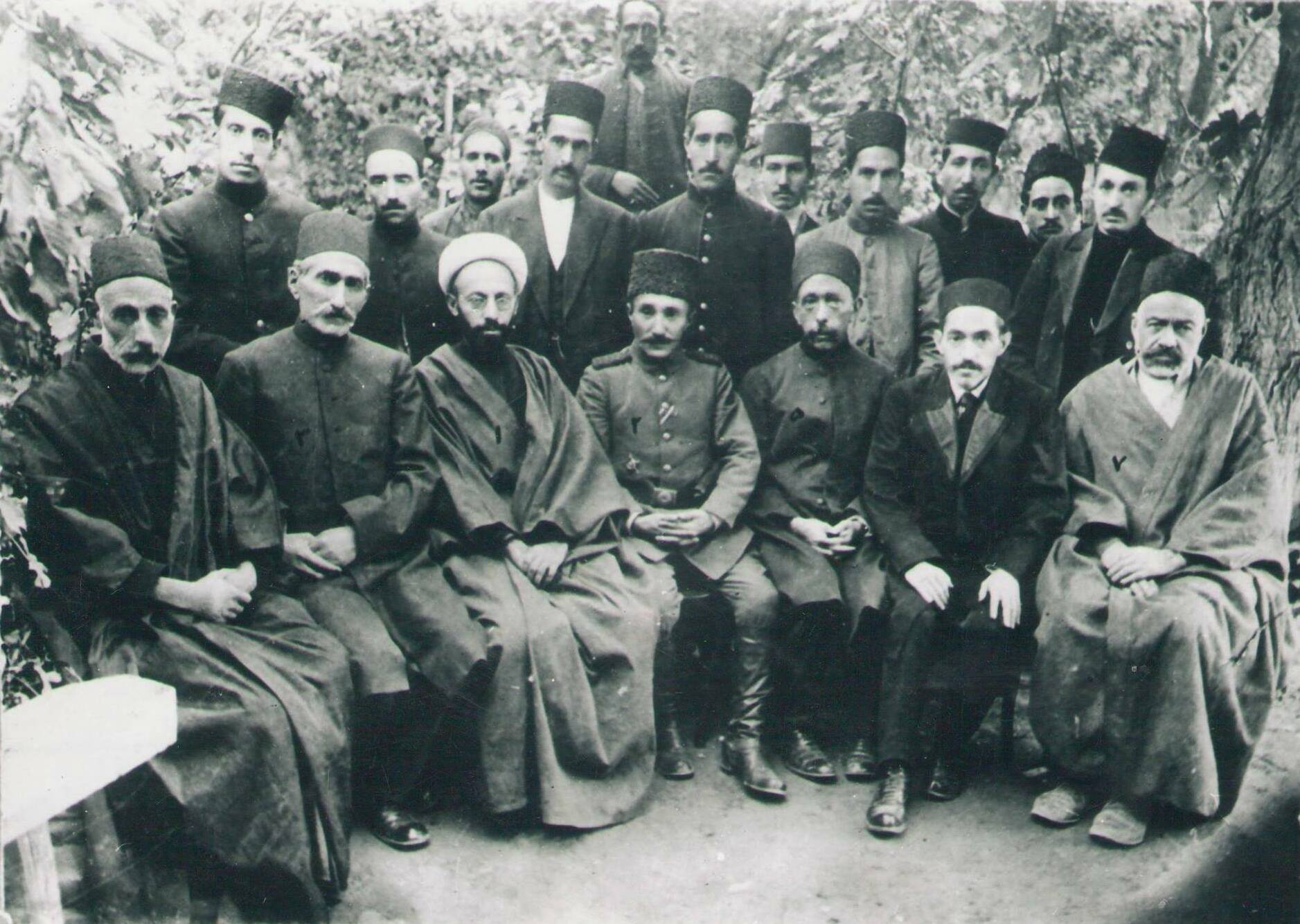
Seated from left: 3rd Mirza Ali Heyat and 4th Yusif Ziya Talibzadeh. Tabriz, 1919

In 1919, he went to Tabriz as the head of the delegation of the Ottoman state. Here, he was a representative of the Ottoman state in the "Ittihadi-Islam" society founded by Javad Heyat's father, Mirza Ali Heyat to prevent the massacres committed by Armenians and Assyrians against the local Azerbaijani Turks and to protect the cities.

=== In the Azerbaijan SSR ===
After the April invasion, he was arrested while trying to cross the Iranian border with Azerbaijan. After his arrest, he met with Nariman Narimanov and was released from prison. From February 1921, he started working as a member of the Nakhchivan Revolutionary Committee. He was appointed as a military commissar in the rank of general. During his activity, he fought against the Dashnak gangs that committed massacres and looting in the region. In October 1921, the Council of People's Commissars of Nakhchivan included food, land, finance, health, education, internal affairs, military affairs, people's commissariats of labor and rural inspection, foreign affairs, communications, labor, internal trade, social security, justice, foreign trade, emergency commission, national economy council and military tribunal commissariats were also created. During this period, Ziya Yusif Talibzadeh was appointed the Commissioner of Foreign Affairs for a short period of time. His good relations with the Turkish pashas served to strengthen the security of Nakhchivan. Returning to Baku at the end of 1922, Yusif Ziya met with Nariman Narimanov and said that he did not want to serve the Soviet regime and could not adapt to this structure. Having received an official document from N. Narimanov to leave the borders of the Soviet Union, he left Azerbaijan.

=== In the Basmacchi movement ===
After leaving Azerbaijan, he went to Turkestan. Here, together with Anvar Pasha and Zaki Validi Togan, he joined the Basmachi movement fighting against the Bolsheviks. On May 18, 1923, he was seriously wounded in one of the battles with the Red Army. He drowned while trying to cross the Amudarya river together with his comrades-in-arms.

== Family ==
His father Akhund Mustafa Talibzadeh was the deputy of Transcaucasia sheikhulislam.

His brother Abdulla Shaikg was an honored artist, poet, and writer of the Azerbaijan SSR.

== Literary works ==
- "Tahsili-Qawaid" (1902)
- "Tahsili-Niswan" (1902)
- "Hadiyyayi-nisvan" (1903)
- "Biography of Mr. Haji Zeynalabdin Taghiyev, famous for his wealth and generosity" (1903)
- "Sharia teacher" (1903, 1908, 1909)
- "Education of Sharia" (1904)
- "The Truth of Islam" (1905)
- "History of Islam" (Volume One, 1907)
- "Brief History of Islam" (Part Two, 1912)
