= Azerbaijan Railway Museum =

Railway museum in Baku

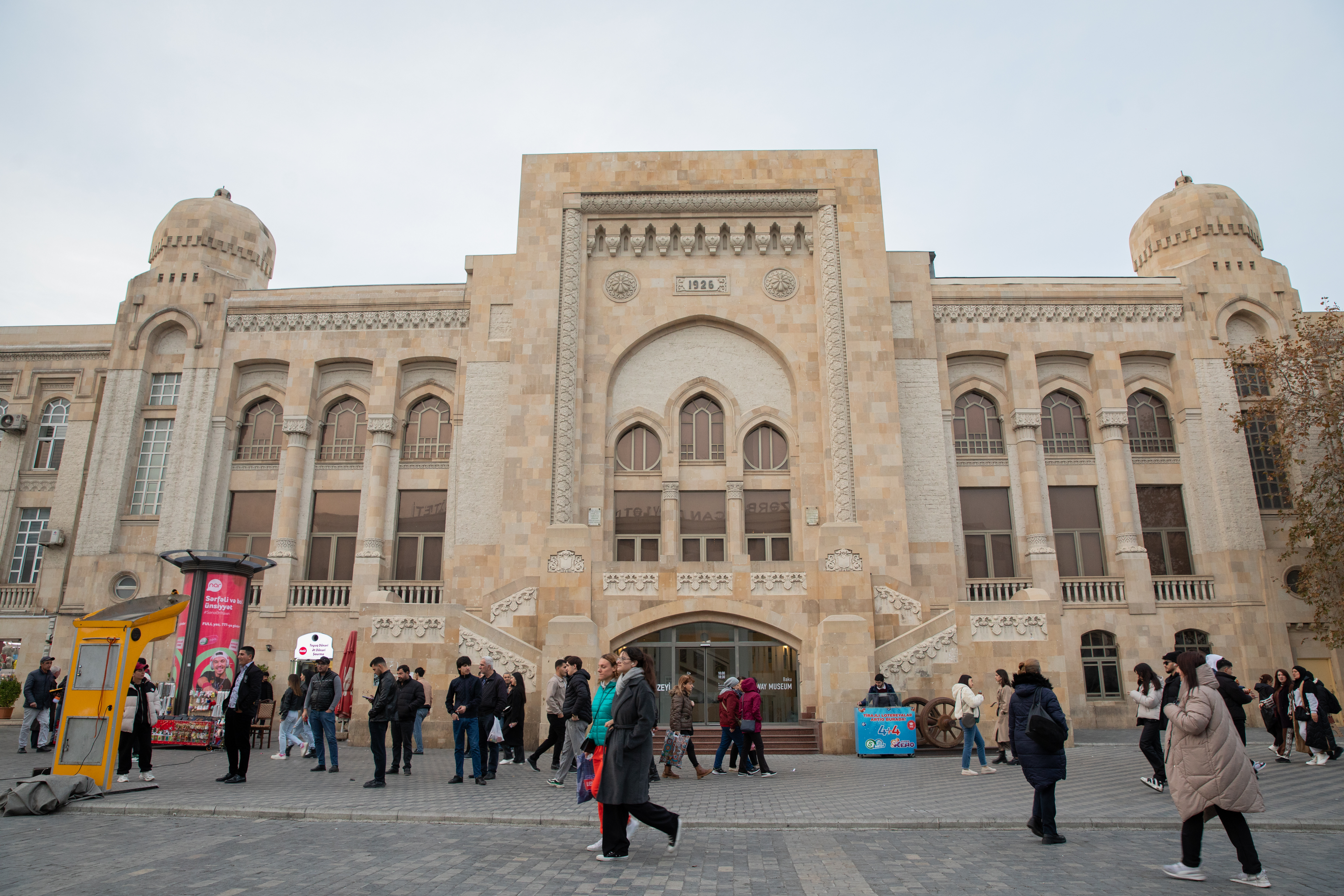
- Established: 2019
- Location: Jafar Jabbarli Square, Baku, Azerbaijan
- Coordinates: 40°22′45.18″N 49°50′53.42″E
- Type: Railway museum
- Website: Official website

Azerbaijan Railway Museum (Azerbaijani: Azərbaycan Dəmiryol Muzeyi) is a railway museum in Baku, Azerbaijan. The museum was opened in 2019.

The museum is located in the historic building of Sabunchu Railway Station in the city center of Baku, near Jafar Jabbarli Square (28 May metro station).

== History ==
The opening of the Azerbaijan Railway Museum took place on November 19, 2019, with the participation of President Ilham Aliyev.

Reconstruction works were carried out in the museum, which was closed during the COVID-19 pandemic, and after being enriched with new exhibits, it started welcoming visitors on December 28, 2023.

The historic Sabunchu Railway Station (near the 28 May metro station), one of the three buildings comprising the historical station complex of the Baku Passenger Station, is home to the Azerbaijan Railway Museum. This building was commissioned on July 6, 1926, the day of the opening of the first electrified railway in Azerbaijan. Sabunchu Railway Station in Baku was the first station building to receive electric trains.

The building was constructed based on the national architectural traditions of Azerbaijan and is reminiscent of the Palace of the Shirvanshahs due to its appearance and many elements. The windows of the building made in the style of national “shabaka” art, the decor of the Shirvanshahs period in the upper part of the facade of the entrance, and the stone carvings of lions on the clock tower are noteworthy.

The museum has two exhibition halls, a cinema hall, and halls for organizing cultural and corporate events. Events such as book signing days, reading hours, book and art exhibitions, meetings with public figures are held here. In the halls, various interesting exhibits related to the development stages of the railway sector of Azerbaijan, including photo and video materials reflecting the history of the creation of the railway in the 19th century, and train models are displayed. Also, a photo corner was created to reflect the services rendered by President Heydar Aliyev in the development of railways in Azerbaijan.

== Gallery ==
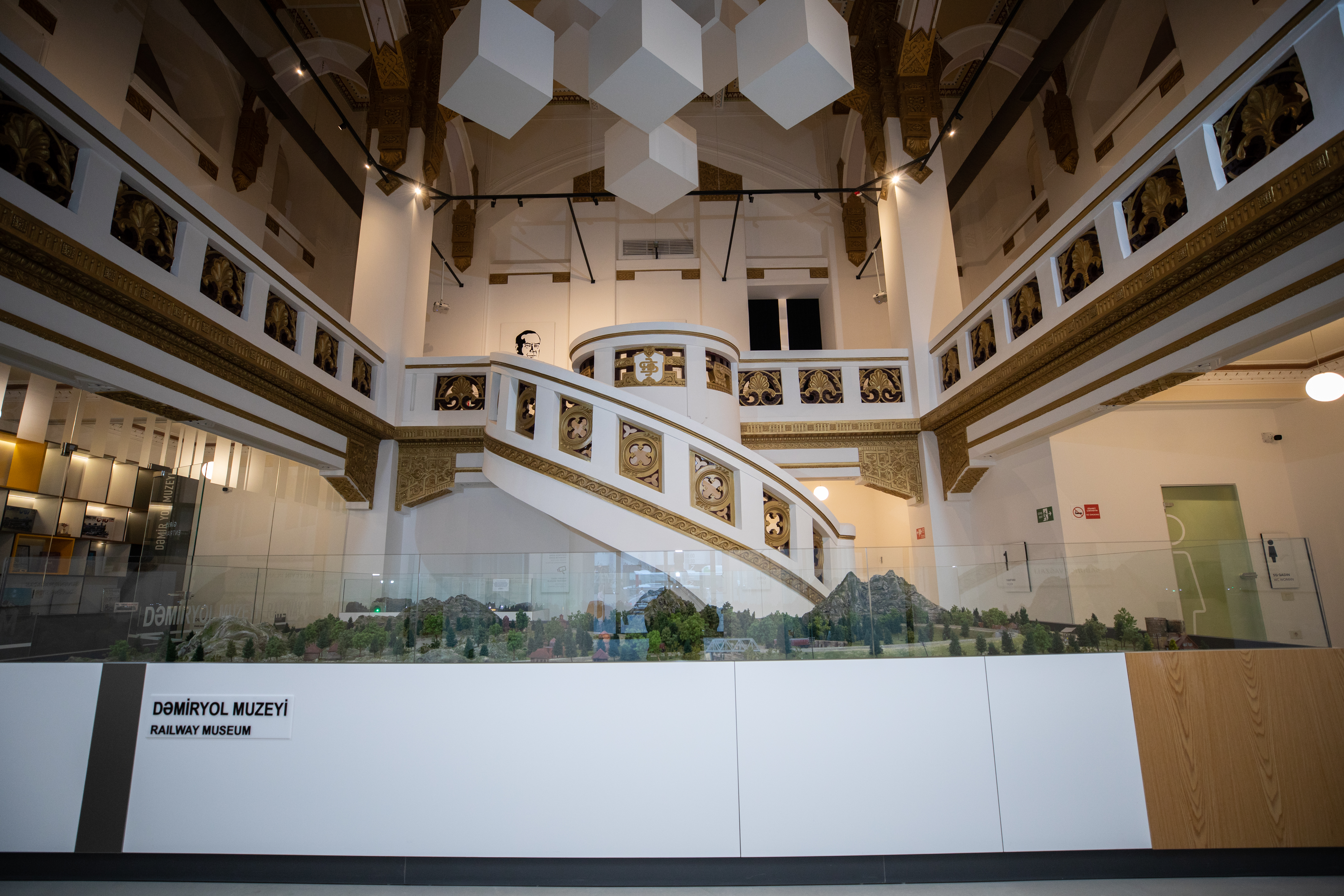

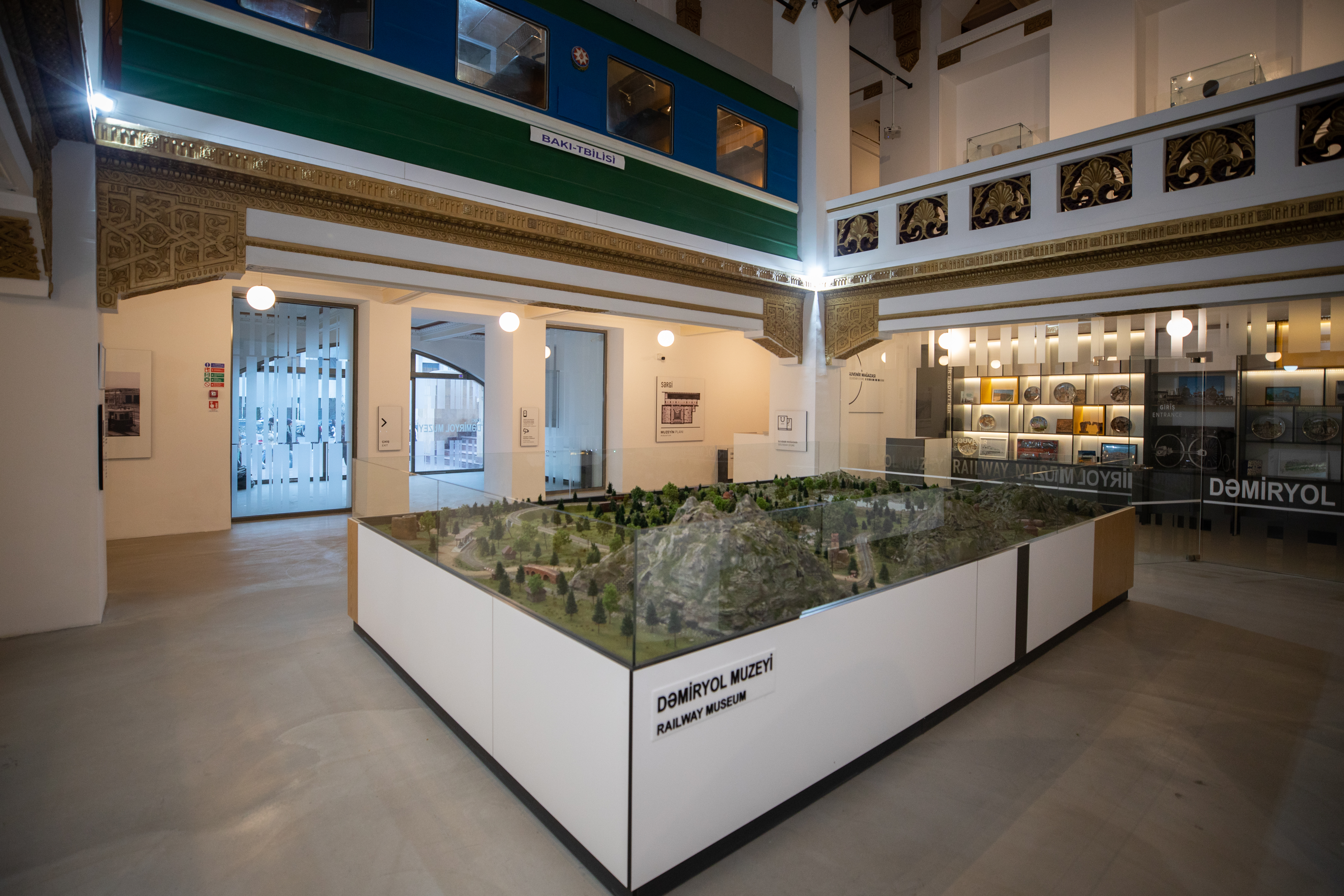

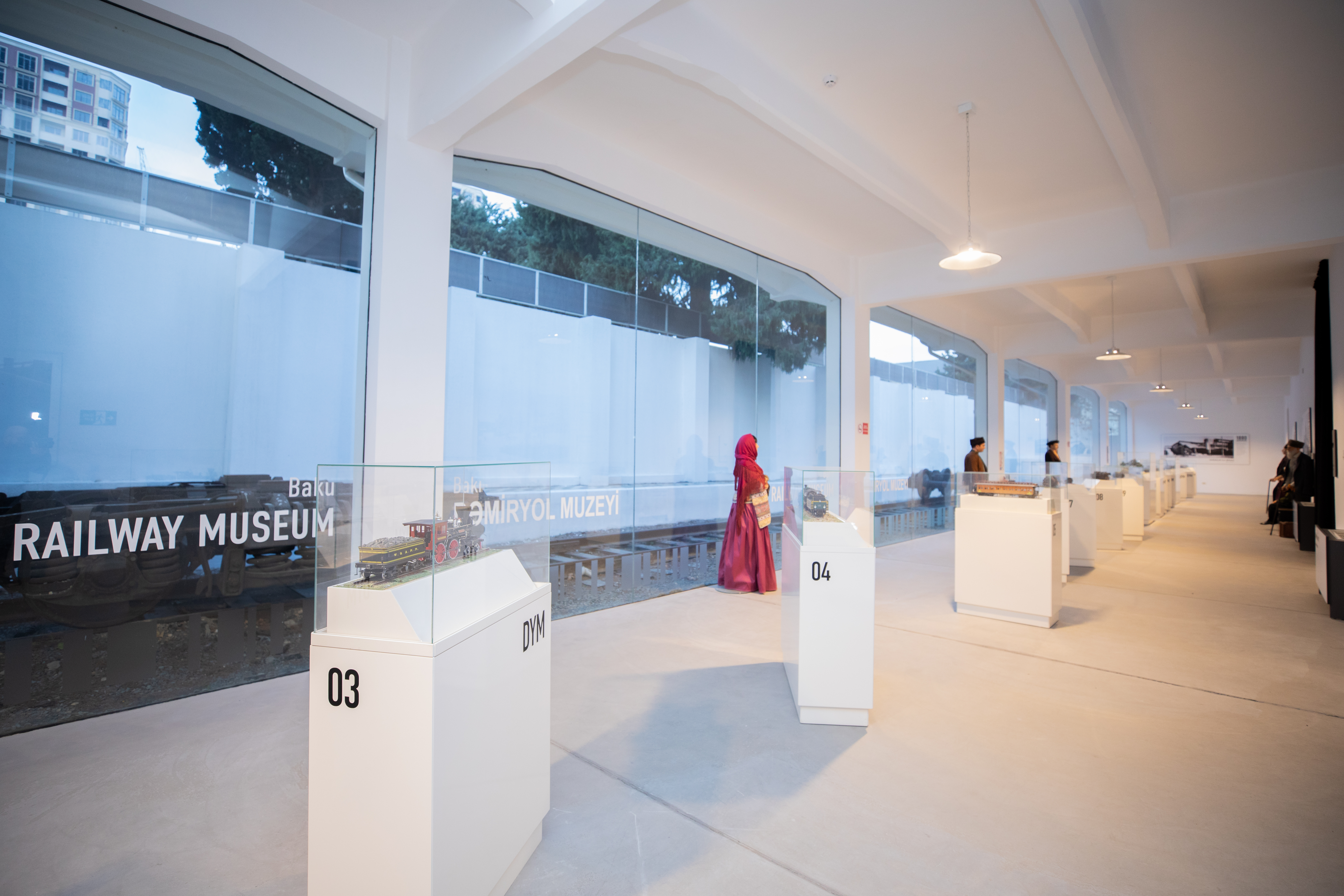

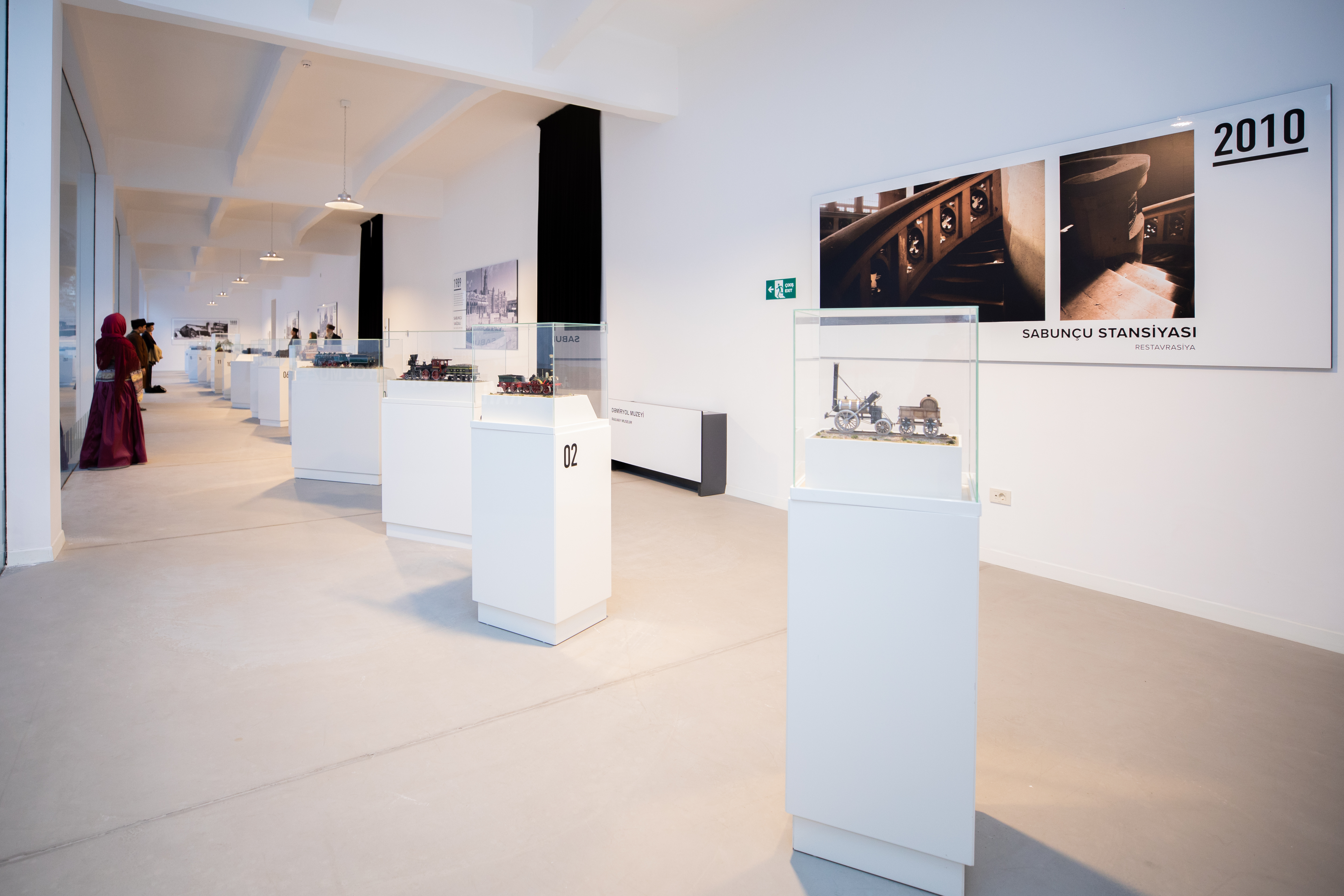

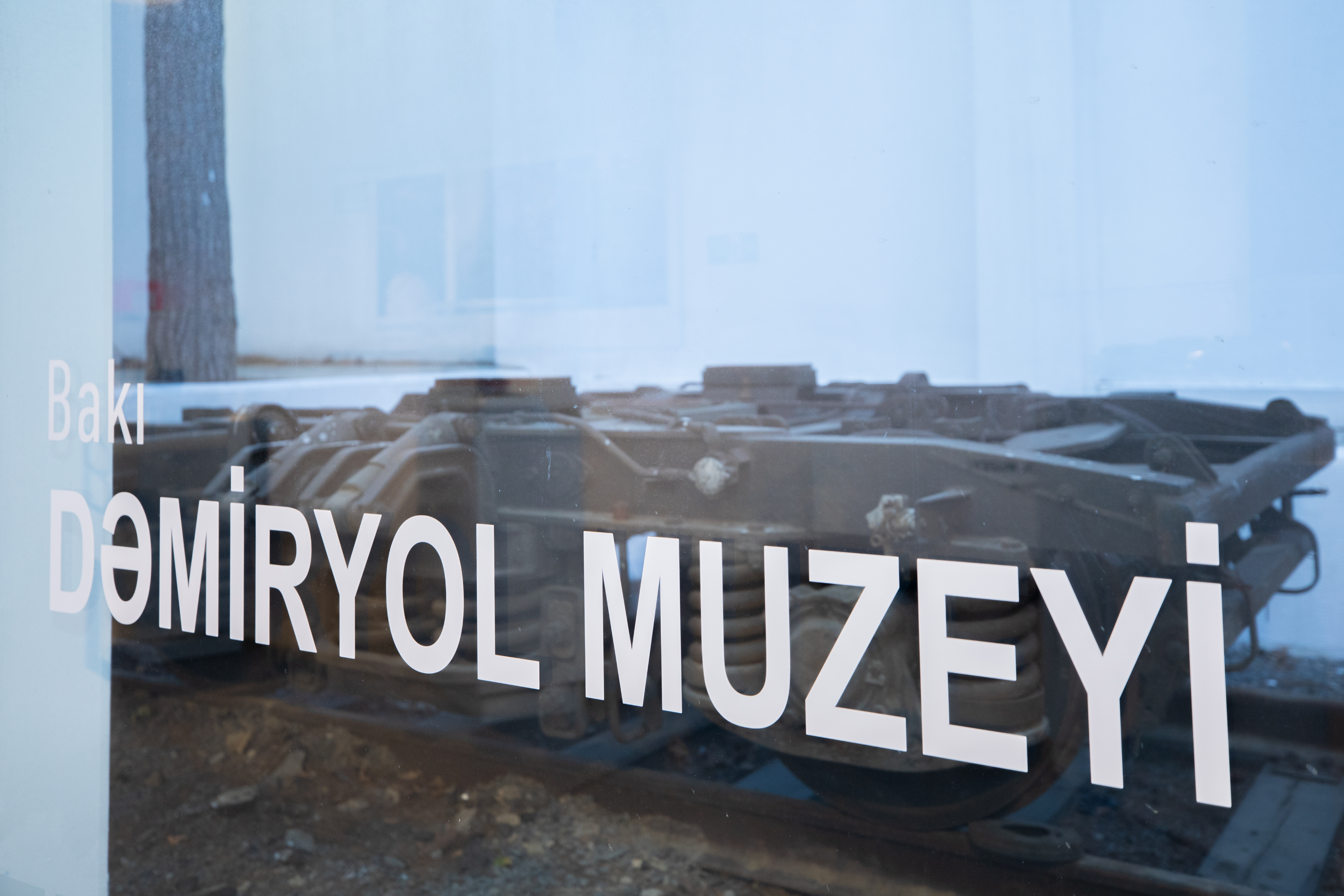

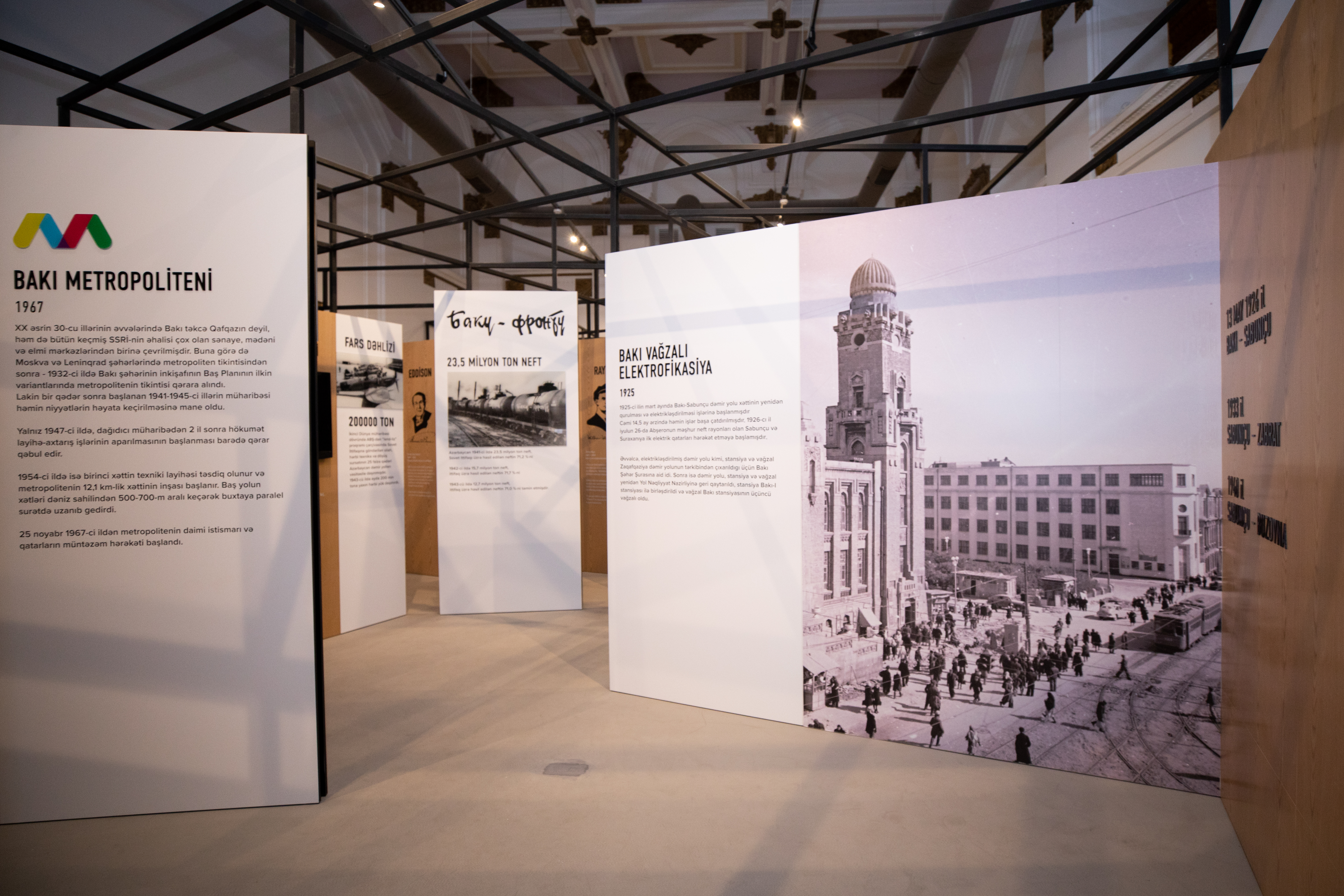

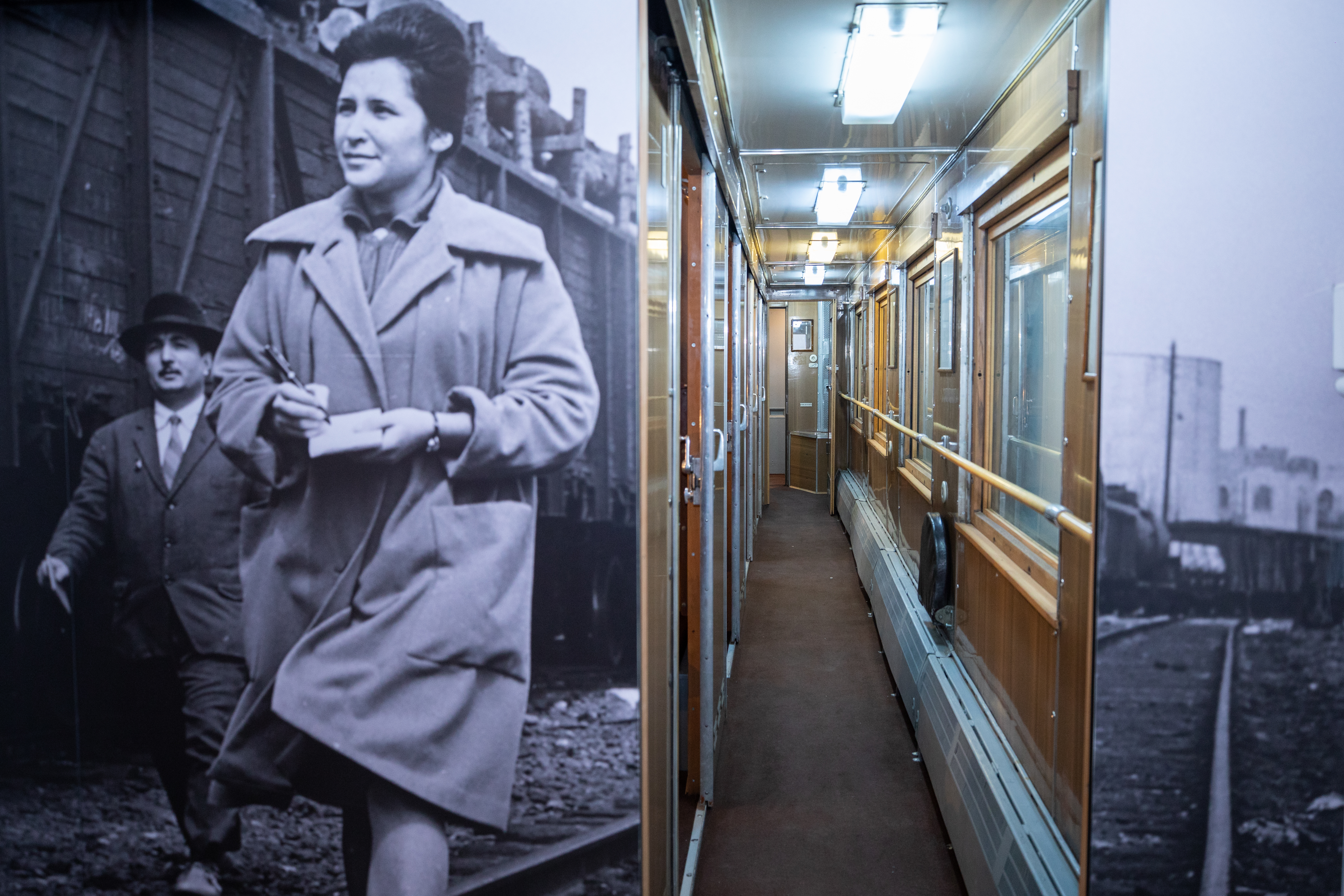

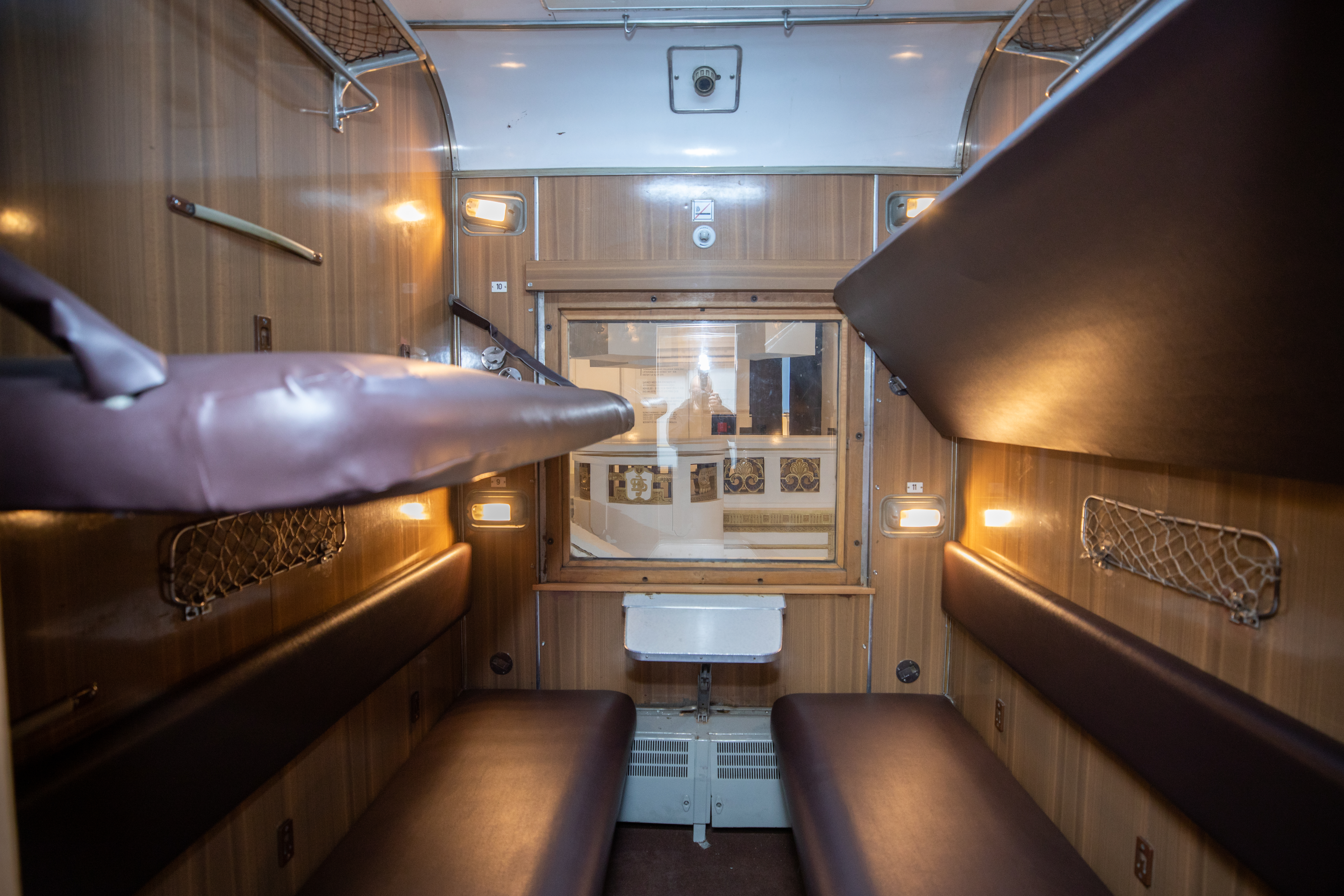

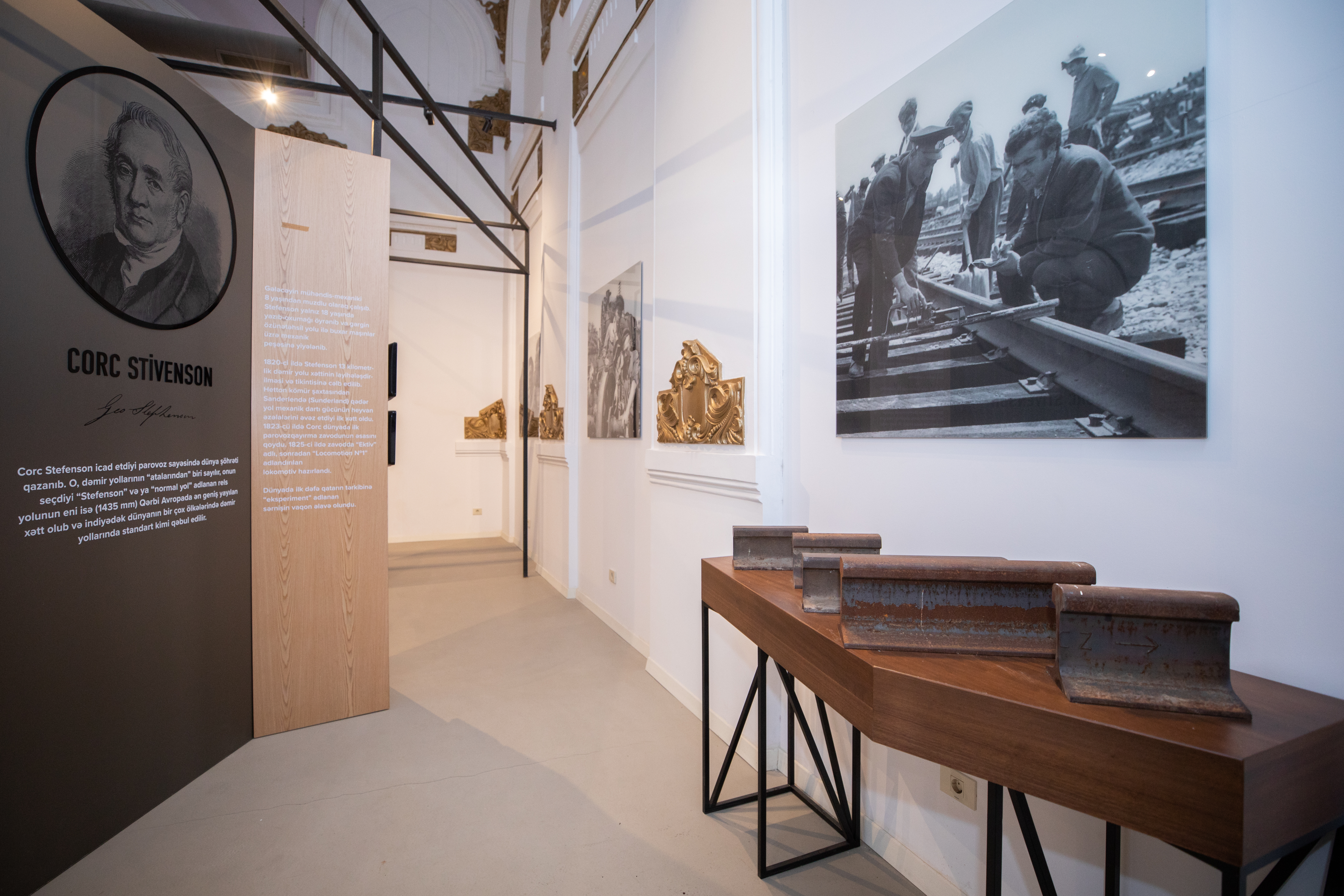

== See also ==
- List of museums in Baku
