= Mustafa Talibzade =

Azerbaijani Islamic cleric, akhund

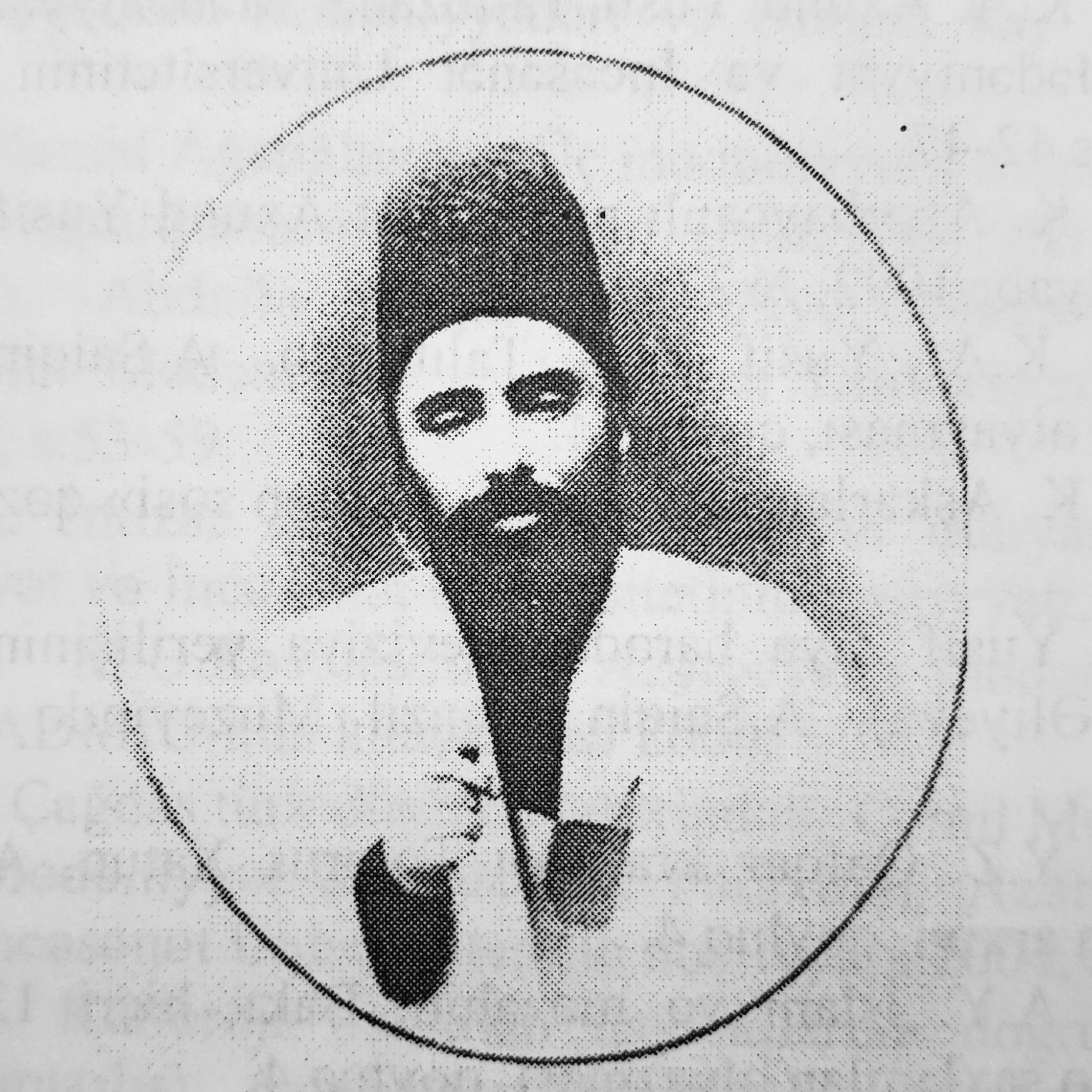
- Born: Mustafa Suleyman oglu Talibzade; 1842; Sarvan, Borchaly uezd, Tiflis Governorate, Russian Empire
- Died: 1903 (aged 60–61); Tiflis, Tiflis uezd, Tiflis Governorate, Russian Empire
- Occupations: Deputy of Tiflis ghazi and Sheikh-ul-Islam of Transcaucasia
- Years active: 1873-1900

Akhund Mustafa Akhund Suleyman oglu Talibzade (Azerbaijani: Axund Mustafa Axund Süleyman oğlu Talıbzadə) was a religious figure, akhund, deputy of the Tiflis ghazi and Sheikh-ul-Islam of Transcaucasia.

== Biography ==
Mustafa Talibzade was born in 1842 in Sarvan village, Borchali district. He received his higher religious education at the Haji Safarali Madrasah in Tabriz. In 1871, he received the certificate confirming the full course of religious knowledge completion. Two years after returning from Tabriz to Tiflis, on 12 December 1873, he passed the exam in the Shiite spiritual administration and received the title of akhund.

On 1 March 1874, he was elected as member of the Tiflis-Kutais Shiite Provincial Council and had under his responsibility to control the work of schools and the process of writing textbooks. In 1881, he was commissioned to write a Sharia textbook, and on 6 March 1882, he was appointed as member of the Shiite Spiritual Administration. Later he began teaching at the "School of Ali" under the spiritual administration.

Until 1881, he served as deputy of Tiflis ghazi, then as deputy of Sheikh-ul-Islam of Caucasian Muslims Ahmed Salyani.

On 22 April 1900, by the order of Adjutant General Grigory Golitsyn, Akhund Mustafa Talibzade was relieved of his post of member of the spiritual administration and was removed from other official duties.

He died in 1903 and was buried in the Muslim cemetery of Tiflis.

== Family ==
He was married to Mehri Jafar gizi. From this marriage were born two boys and a girl: on 22 January 1877, Yusif Ziya Talibzade, on 12 February 1881, Abdullah Shaig, and on 22 July 1884, the daughter Rugiya.

Yusif Ziya Talibzade was a teacher, politician, playwright, and military. He participated in the Balkan wars, the First World War, the battle for Baku and in the Basmachi movement. He was also the military commissar of Nakhchivan.

Abdullah Shaig was an honored worker of arts of the Azerbaijan SSR, a poet, and a prose writer.
