= Pispisa Khanim ve Sichan bey =

- Directed by: Aghanaghi Akhundov, Masud Panahi
- Written by: Abdulla Shaig
- Music by: Ramiz Mirishli
- Distributed by: Azerbaijanfilm
- Release date: 1974
- Running time: 10 minutes
- Country: Soviet Union
- Languages: Azerbaijani, Russian

Pispisa Khanim ve Sichan bey (Azerbaijani: Pıspısa xanım və Siçan bəy, English: Miss Pispisa and Mr Mouse), also known as Tig-Tig Khanim, is a 1974 Soviet animated short by Masud Panahi and Aghanaghi Akhundov. The animation was based on Abdulla Shaig's "Tig-tig khanum" fairytale published in 1910.

== Plot ==
Tig-tig Khanum is a lonely insect who is searching for a friend. After altering her looks, she meets a human shepherd and asks him if they can be friends and what he would do if she makes him angry. He responds that he would hurt her with his flute, so she rejects the shepherd. Tig-tig Khanum finds a wolf and also asks him for friendship, but the wolf threatens to chew her if he gets upset, so she rejects the wolf. Tig-tig Khanum then finds Mouse bey, who accepts her friendship and won't harm her if he gets angry. They dance at a wedding ceremony with the song "Nalbaki" played by the mice.

Mouse bey tells Tig-tig Khanum that there's a wedding in the cat king's palace and he'll bring food home, leaving her at home because it's dangerous to go. Tig-tig Khanum gets bored, goes outside, and a hedgehog appears. She tells him Mouse bey abandoned her and she wants to be friends with the hedgehog, but he's satisfied with his own friends. Tig-tig Khanum falls to a river and struggles to swim. She shouts to the cats riding on a passing horse-drawn carriage that she wants to get rescued. The cats repeat Tig-tig Khanum's words; Mouse bey hears them and rushes to the river. He offers his hand to save Tig-tig Khanum, but she rejects due to his negligence. As Mouse bey turns around and walks away, she grabs his tail to escape the river and lets it go. Her appearance reverts due to her wetness and she becomes lonely again.

Singer: Flora Karimova

== Voice cast ==
- Zemfira Ismayilova as Pispisa Khanum
- Aghakhan Salmanov as Janavar
