= Azerbaijan State Agriculture Museum =

Museum in Baku, Azerbaijan

Coordinates: 40°25′44″N 49°50′38″E

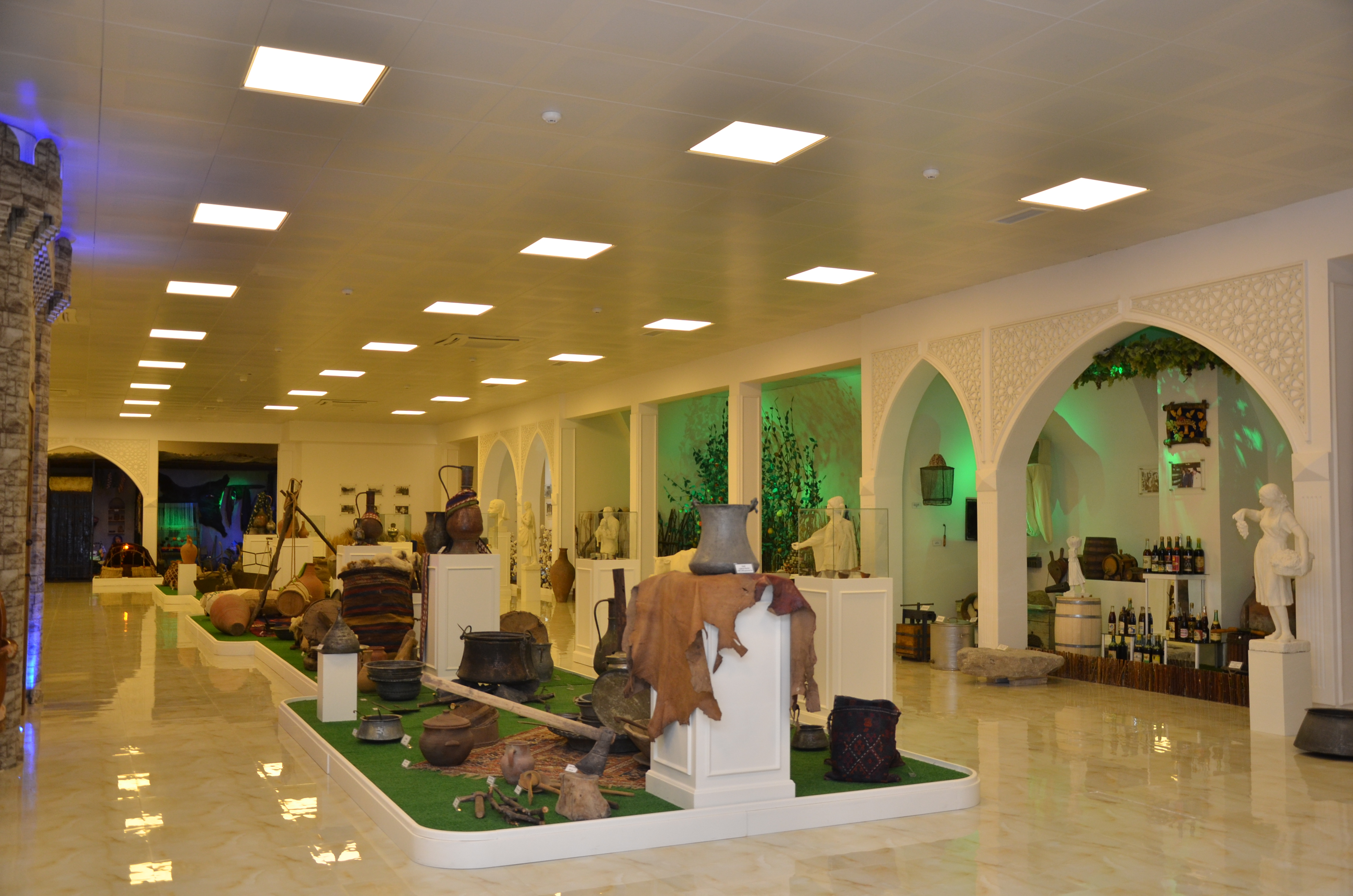
Exhibition in the museum

The Azerbaijan State Agriculture Museum, established in 1924, presents the history of agricultural development in Azerbaijan and reflects its current state.

The museum has more than 10,000 exhibits and mostly describes agricultural tools, both traditional and modern, and models of harvesters. The museum exposition covers various fields of agriculture: crop growing, cattle breeding, and horticulture. A variety of exhibits are devoted to ethnography: documents and photos, as well as facilities reflecting the traditional way of rural life.

There is an old hand-mill for grinding flour which is more than 100 years old and an oil lamp of the same age, a stone extracting grape juice, ceramic jugs for milk whipping and butter production and stirrups, saddles.

There are two maps in the museum that has been embroidered with silk threads and the other one has been made of wheat grains, lentils and watercress.

The museum guides wear Azerbaijani national garments and traditional music is played in the halls of the museum.

The museum regularly features documentary film screenings and lectures, and organizes travelling exhibitions. The Azerbaijani State Agriculture Museum is especially popular among students of various educational institutions for whom special thematic visits and lessons are organized where they are able to experience the stages of development of agriculture in Azerbaijan. The museum is interesting for both children and adults.
