= House-Museum of Leopold and Mstislav Rostropovich =

Museum in Baku, Azerbaijan

- Leopold və Mstislav Rostropoviçlərin ev-muzeyi (Azerbaijani)
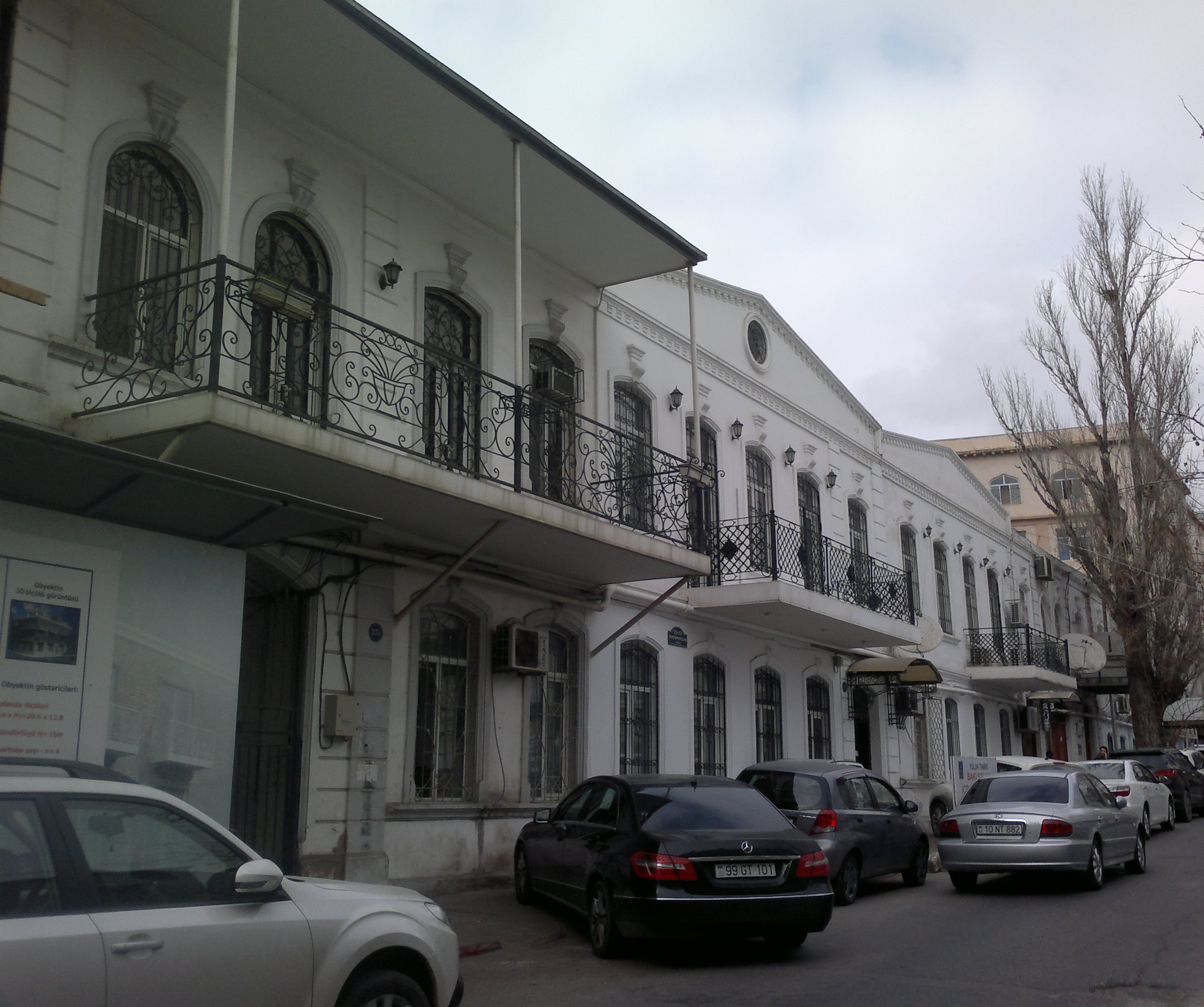
- House in Baku, where Rostropovich was born.
- Location: Baku, Azerbaijan
- Coordinates: 40°22′11″N 49°49′39″E

The House-Museum of Leopold and Mstislav Rostropovich (Azerbaijani: Leopold və Mstislav Rostropoviçlərin ev-muzeyi, Russian: Дом-музей Леопольда и Мстислава Ростроповичей) is a national memorial/museum in Baku, Azerbaijan.

== History ==
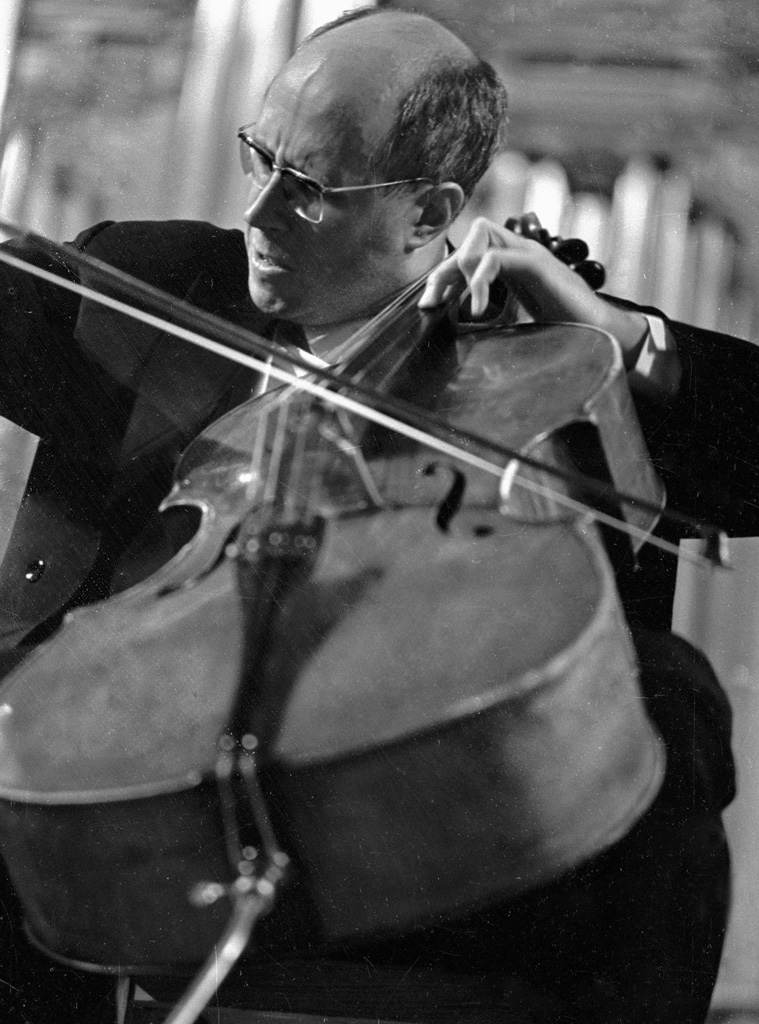
Mstislav Rostropovich

The house-museum of Leopold and Mstislav was created in 1998 in the building where the Rostropovich family lived during its stay in Baku from 1925 to 1931. Leopold Rostropovich was invited to Baku in 1925 from Orenburg by the Azerbaijani composer Uzeyir Hajibeyov. Leopold Rosrtopovich accepted the invitation and the whole family moved to Baku, where he and his wife began teaching at the Azerbaijani State Conservatory.

On March 27, 1927, the cellist, pianist and conductor Mstislav Rostropovich was born in this house. The street where the museum is now located bears the name of the father of the son, Rostropovich. The museum was opened to visitors in 2002. Mstislav Rostropovich himself was present during the museum’s opening ceremony with his wife Galina Vishnevskaya and many guests.

== Structure ==
At present, the main collection of the House-museum contains more than 5000 exhibits. Among the exhibits are many items that belonged to the Rostropovich family. In the house there is a carpet and furniture from the late 19th century to early 20th century. The exhibition also contains photographs, letters, autographs, concert tailcoat, conductor’s baton, gramophone records, awards and other artifacts. The museum consists of four rooms and a hallway. Part of the hallway and the first room bear memorial character. All of the rooms of the museum are devoted to the creativity M.Rostropovich and specific periods in his life.

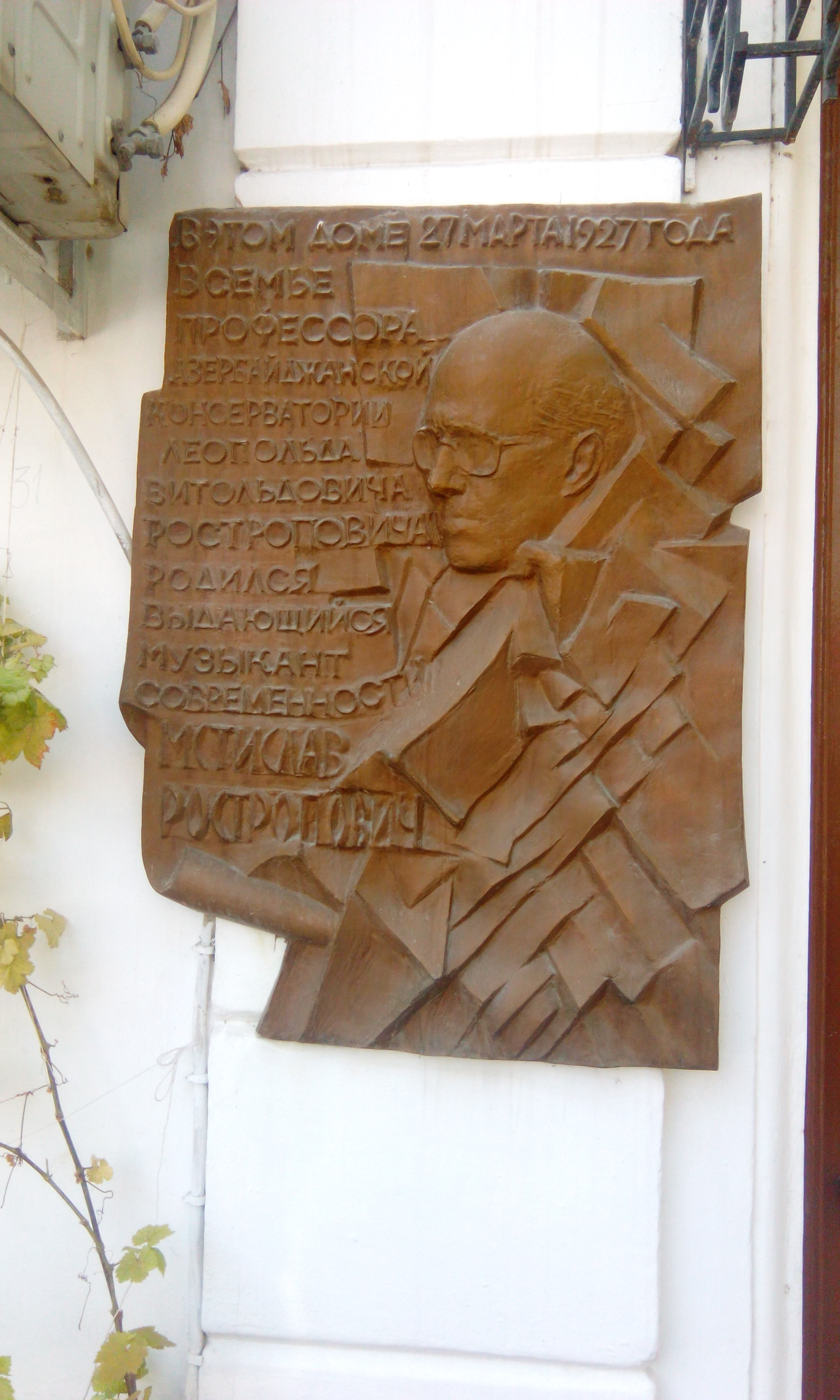
Plaque on building where Azerbaijani and Russian cellist and conductor Mstislav Rostropovich lived in Baku

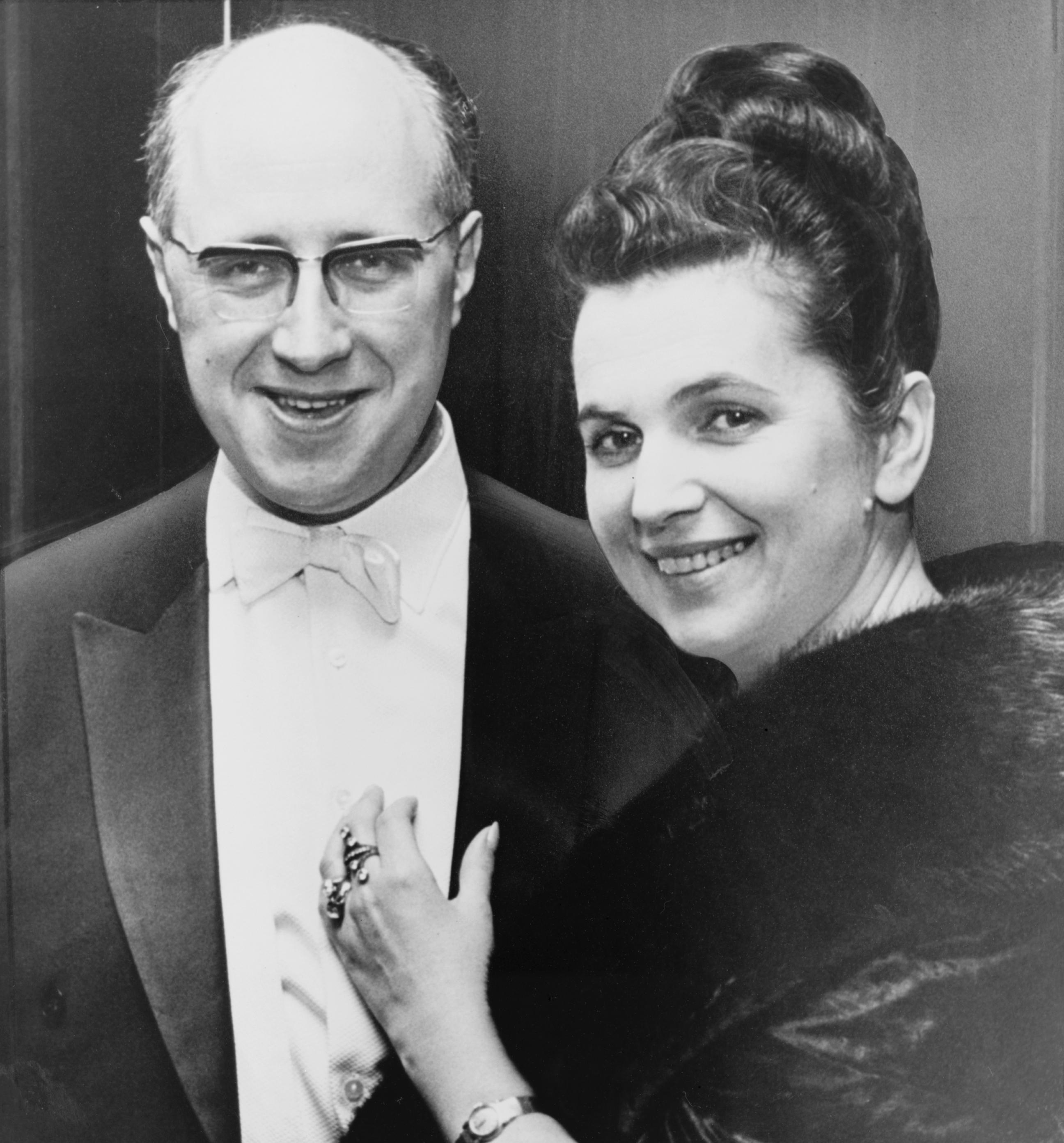
Mstislav Rostropovich with wife Galina Vishnevskaya in 1965
