= House-Museum of Samad Vurgun =

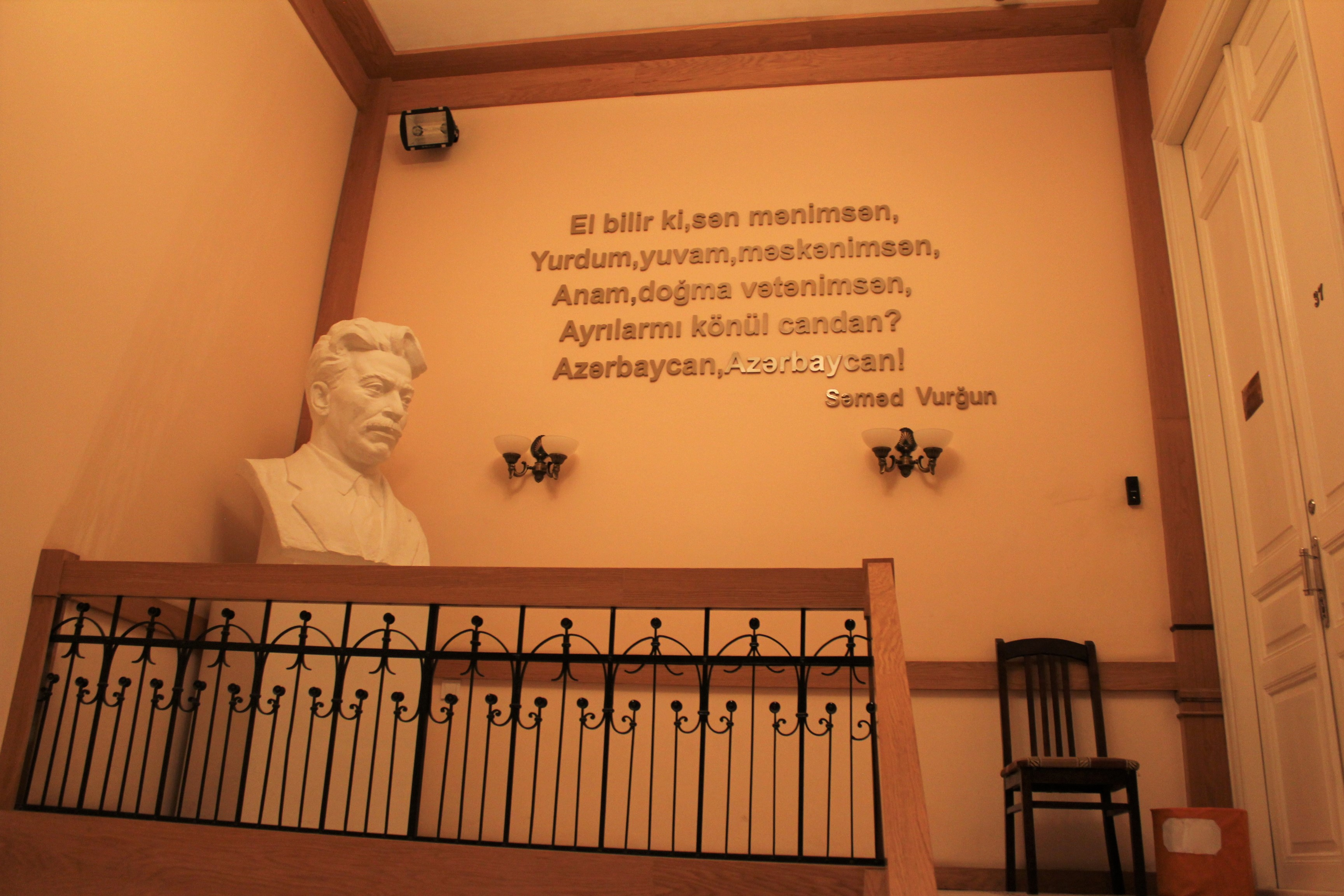
- Memorial House-Museum of samad Vurgun
- Established: 6 October 1975
- Location: 4, Tarlan Aliyarbekov str. Baku, Azerbaijan
- Director: Vurgun Vekilov

The House-Museum of Samad Vurgun in Azerbaijan commemorates the poet, scientist, and public figure Samad Vurgun (1906–1956), twice the State Prize Laureate Samad Vurgun's house museum is the first memorial museum created to perpetuate the memory of writers and composers in Azerbaijan. It is under the control of Ministry of Culture and Tourism of the Republic of Azerbaijan.

== Description ==
The museum is located in a six-room apartment on the third floor of a 19th-century building. Samad Vurgun lived in this apartment for the last two years of his life, engaged in his activities.

The home-museum, which was conceived in 1974 by the decision of the government, was opened on October 6, 1975.

During the past period, the fund of the museum was expanded, new exposition units were created, research on the life and activity of the poet was conducted. Collecting is the basis of the museum's activity. This work is carried out on a planned basis as well as on a variety of topics. As a result of this, the memorial items of the Vurgun, original photographs, paintings, manuscripts, research works, gifts, magazines of the past years, etc. materials have enlarged the museum fund. At present, the total number of exhibits is over 16,000.

The Poetry House, a branch of the museum, is located in the village of Yukhari Salahli in Qazakh region where the poet was born. The three rooms in the museum - the poet's work room, guest and bedroom are kept as it is in his health. In the other three rooms, the exposition was created, reflecting Vurgun's life and public activity, and for his memorialization.

The poet's office - the cabinet. Everything is simple, everything is ordinary. Writing table, chairs, cupboards with books. At the writing table, the poet's latest manuscripts, cigarettes he could not draw for his lifetime, a photo taken by his wife and his children, and a purple scarf in a small basket were portrayed as the poet's most loved violet roses. "Vagif", "Farhad and Shirin", "Human", "Aygun" and many other works of art, articles, speeches were once realized behind this writing table.

The guest room of the poet is preserved as it is in his health. Samad Vurghun was a poet, but also an open-minded man, a hospitable host. This guesthouse was often visited by poets' friends - writers, composers, artists, rural workers and fans of his talent.

There is a royal in the room. The founder of the Azerbaijan national opera, Uzeyir Hajibeyov, and Gara Garayev, Fikrat Amirov, Said Rustamov, also other composers, performed their works here.

In the living room, in 1944, folk artist Mikail Abdullayev portrays the poet's first-handed portrait. Samead Vurgun is described here in his garden.

There is a clock between exhibits. When Samad Vurgun died, on May 27, 1956, the poet's wife Havar Khanim stopped the clock.

The last of the memorial rooms is the bedroom of the poet. Here, too, everything is preserved as it was. There is also a death mask of the poet from 1956.

In addition, Vagif Samadoglu, the son of Samad Vurgun, also has a writing desk, violin, piano and other items in this museum.
