= Azerbaijan State Museum of History of Religion =

- Former name: Historical Museum of Atheism
- Established: 17 September 1990
- Location: 123а Neftchilar Ave; Baku, AZ1000; Azerbaijan
- Coordinates: 40.369775°N 49.842625°E
- Type: Religious museum
- Collection size: 4000

The Azerbaijan State Museum of History and Religion is located in Baku, Azerbaijan, which highlights religious views of primitive people who lived in ancient times. The museum is joined to the Ministry of Culture and Tourism of the Republic of Azerbaijan in 1993.

1967 - the Historical Museum of Atheism was established by the Council of Ministers of the Azerbaijan SSR.

September 17, 1990 - The museum was renamed the State Museum of the History of Religion by decree number 414 of the Cabinet.

In June 1993, the museum was temporarily transferred to the Museum Center.

== Collections ==
The Scientific Foundation of the Museum of the History of Religion consists of works of art, samples of graphics, sculpture, books and manuscripts, photographs, newspapers and magazines, documents and other items related to Buddhism, Judaism, Christianity and Islam. There are more than 4 thousand exhibits in the funds like Collections of Buddhist artifacts, Buddha statue decorated with various stones, Icons depicted on the canvas, Collections of Jewish exhibits, instances of the Talmud, Collections and complexes of Christian exhibits, instances of the Bible, samples of the clothes of the servants of the church, Artistic works written on religious themes, Icons created on metal and canvas, Collections of Islamic artifacts, The manuscripts of the Quran are collected in different periods, Copyrights, Artistic works written by Azerbaijani artists on religious themes, Various objects for performing religious rites, Photos, Newspapers, Magazines etc.
