= Abdulla Shaig =

Azerbaijani writer (1881–1959)

- Abdulla Şaiq
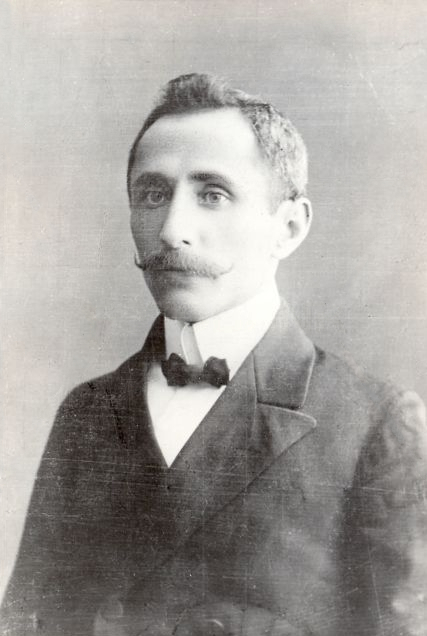
- Shaig in 1910
- Born: Abdulla Mustafa oglu Talibzadeh; 25 February 1881; Tbilisi, Georgia, Russian Empire
- Died: 24 July 1959 (aged 78); Baku, Azerbaijan, USSR
- Occupations: Writer, translator, teacher

Abdulla Shaig (Azerbaijani: Abdulla Şaiq) (25 February 1881, Tbilisi – 24 July 1959, Baku), born Abdulla Mustafa oglu Talibzadeh, was an Azerbaijani writer.

== Early life and education ==
Shaig was born to Marneuli-native Azerbaijani parents, Mustafa Talibzadeh and Mehri Bayramli. His father was an akhoond at the Caucasus Muslim Clerical Board, who taught Islamic law, Persian and Arabic at a secondary school in Tbilisi (then Tiflis). In 1883, due to a strained relationship with her husband, Shaig's mother moved with her two sons and a daughter to Khorasan (Iran), where Abdulla Shaig later attended a school. As a teenager, he wrote ghazals and translated a number of pieces from the Russian literature into Persian. In 1901, at the age of 20, he permanently settled in Baku and passed an examination at the First Alexandrian Gymnasium becoming a certified teacher. He worked in the field of public education for the next 33 years.

== Works ==
Shaig was a romanticist and a children's author. His plays and folklore-oriented tales first started being published in local newspapers and magazines in 1906. Later he was also known for writing short stories that illustrated bitter consequences of poverty and economic ordeals faced by the working class in pre-Soviet Russia. This made Shaig's works particularly popular in the Soviet Union. His celebration of internationalism and pacifism earned him great success as a writer. Despite his academic work aimed at promoting Azerbaijani culture and somewhat open anti-Stalinist views, he is not believed to have been persecuted by the state.

Shaig managed literature with his teaching career. He was the author of many language and literature textbooks, published from 1909 through 1920. During the brief independence of the Azerbaijan Democratic Republic in 1918–1920 he showed strong ideological support for the ruling party of Musavat.

He also translated numerous works by Shakespeare, Defoe, Pushkin, Lermontov, Krylov, Gorky, Nekrasov, Nizami, and Firdowsi into Azerbaijani and Russian languages.

Some of Shaig's famous works include:

- Undelivered Letter
- Lady Tigtig, the inspiration for Pispisa Khanim ve Sichan bey.
- We're all Rays from the Same Sun
- Heroes of Our Century

== Museum ==
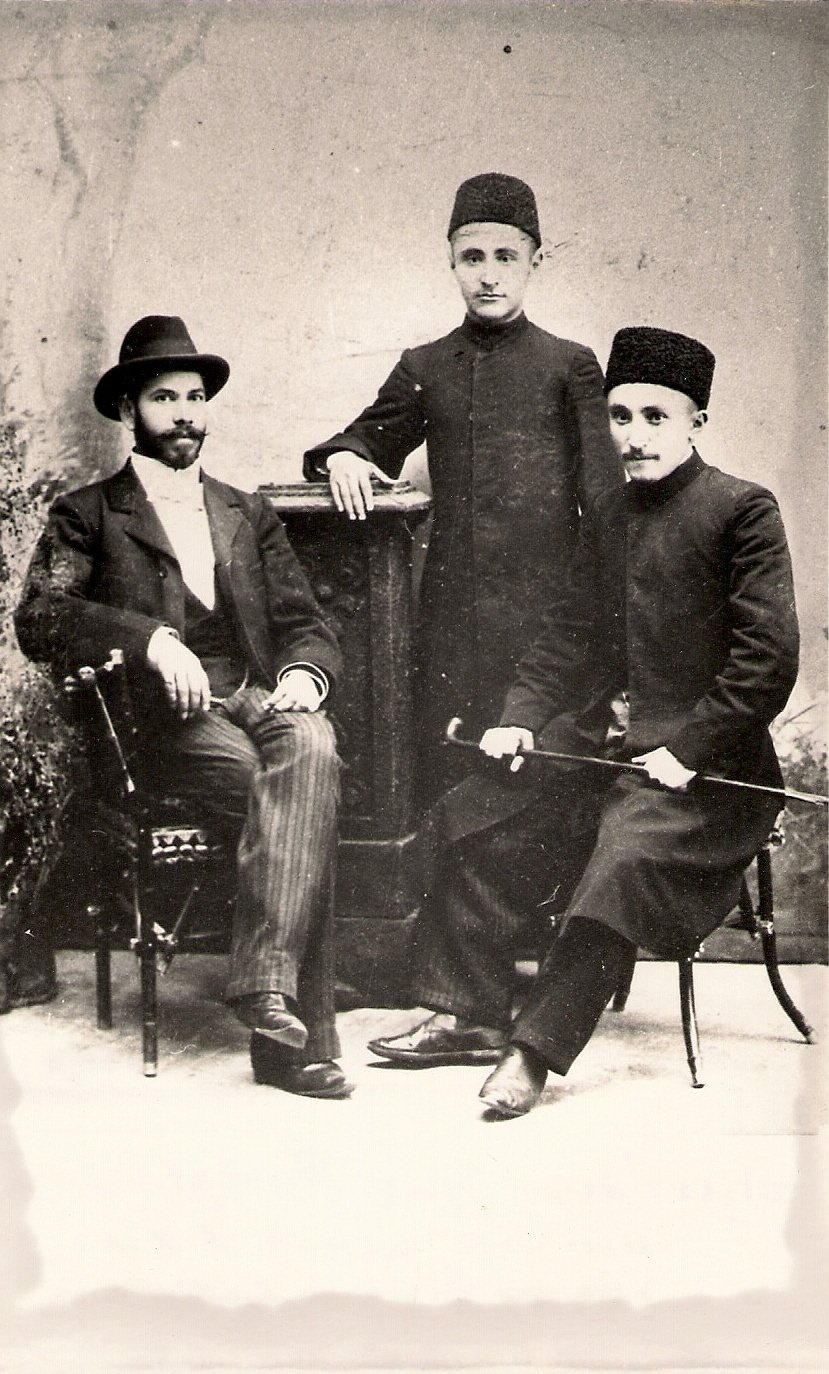
Mirza Taghi Rzayev, Abdulla Shaig and Yusif Ziya Talibzadeh. Tbilisi, 1903

In 1916, he moved to a five-bedroom apartment on the 2nd floor of House No. 21 on Upper Mountain (now on A.Shaiq Street), which is named "Abdulla Shaig's House Museum", where he lived until 1957. A. Shaig's friends Najaf bey Vazirov, Suleyman Sani Akhundov, Huseyn Javid, Bulbul (singer), Yusif Vazir Chamanzaminli, Ahmad Javad, and Samad Vurgun were guests here.

The writer met in this apartment with aspirants, students, and even school pupils who have come up with scientific and creative advice, read their new works, gave conversations and advice. Abdulla Shaig's House Museum is under the control of the Ministry of Culture and Tourism of the Republic of Azerbaijan.
